= List of songs recorded by Pink Floyd =

Songs recorded by English rock band

Pink Floyd are an English rock band who recorded material for fifteen studio albums, three soundtrack albums, three live albums, eight compilation albums, four box sets, as well as material that, to this day, remains unreleased during their five decade career.

There are currently 222 songs on this list.

== Songs ==
Key
†	Indicates instrumental
‡	Indicates non-album single

Name of song, writer(s), lead vocal(s), original release, and year of release.
Song	Writer(s)	Lead vocal(s)	Original release	Year	Length	Ref.
"Absolutely Curtains" †	Roger Waters; David Gilmour; Richard Wright; Nick Mason	Chant by the Mapuga tribe of New Guinea	Obscured by Clouds	1972	5:52	
"Alan's Psychedelic Breakfast" †	David Gilmour; Nick Mason; Roger Waters; Richard Wright	Vocalisations by Alan Styles	Atom Heart Mother	1970	13:00	
"Allons-Y" (2 parts) †	David Gilmour	Instrumental	The Endless River	2014	3:29	
"Anisina" †	David Gilmour	Instrumental	The Endless River	2014	3:16	
"Another Brick in the Wall (Part 1)"	Roger Waters	Roger Waters	The Wall	1979	3:11	
"Another Brick in the Wall (Part 2)	Roger Waters	David Gilmour; Roger Waters; Islington Green School students	The Wall	1979	3:59	
"Another Brick in the Wall (Part 3)"	Roger Waters	Roger Waters	The Wall	1979	1:18	
"Any Colour You Like" †	David Gilmour; Nick Mason; Richard Wright	Instrumental	The Dark Side of the Moon	1973	3:26	
"Apples and Oranges" ‡	Syd Barrett	Syd Barrett	Non-album single	1967	3:08	
"Arnold Layne" ‡	Syd Barrett	Syd Barrett	Non-album single	1967	2:57	
"Astronomy Domine" (Note: A live version was officially released on Ummagumma in 1969.)	Syd Barrett	Syd Barrett; Richard Wright; Intro vocalisations by Peter Jenner	The Piper at the Gates of Dawn	1967	4:12	
"Atom Heart Mother" †	David Gilmour; Nick Mason; Roger Waters; Richard Wright; Ron Geesin	Wordless vocals by John Alldis Choir	Atom Heart Mother	1970	23:44	
"Autumn '68" †	Richard Wright	Instrumental	The Endless River	2014	1:35	
"Baby Blue Shuffle in D Major" †	David Gilmour	Instrumental	The Early Years 1965–1972	2016	3:58	
"Backs to the Wall"	Roger Waters	Roger Waters	The Wall (Immersion edition)	2011	2:24	
"Behold the Temple of Light" †	David Gilmour; Nick Mason; Roger Waters; Richard Wright	Instrumental	The Early Years 1965–1972	2016	5:32	
"Biding My Time"	Roger Waters	Roger Waters	Relics	1971	5:18	
"Bike"	Syd Barrett	Syd Barrett	The Piper at the Gates of Dawn	1967	3:21	
"Blues" †	David Gilmour; Nick Mason; Roger Waters; Richard Wright	Instrumental	The Early Years 1965–1972	2016		
"Blues 1" †	David Gilmour	Instrumental	The Later Years	2019		
"Brain Damage"	Roger Waters	Roger Waters	The Dark Side of the Moon	1973	3:46	
"Breathe"	Roger Waters; David Gilmour; Richard Wright	David Gilmour	The Dark Side of the Moon	1973	2:49	
"Bring the Boys Back Home"	Roger Waters	Roger Waters; New York Opera	The Wall	1979	1:21	
"Burning Bridges"	Richard Wright; Roger Waters	David Gilmour; Richard Wright	Obscured by Clouds	1972	3:29	
"Butterfly"	Syd Barrett	Syd Barrett	1965: Their First Recordings	2015	2:59	
"Calling" †	David Gilmour; Anthony Moore	Instrumental	The Endless River	2014	3:37	
"Candy and a Currant Bun" ‡	Syd Barrett	Syd Barrett	Non-album single B-side to "Arnold Layne"	1967	2:38	
"Careful with That Axe, Eugene" † ‡	David Gilmour; Nick Mason; Roger Waters; Richard Wright	Vocalisations by Roger Waters & David Gilmour	Non-album single B-side to "Point Me at the Sky"	1968	5:45	
"Chapter 24"	Syd Barrett	Syd Barrett	The Piper at the Gates of Dawn	1967	3:42	
"Childhood's End"	David Gilmour	David Gilmour	Obscured by Clouds	1972	4:31	
"Cirrus Minor"	Roger Waters	David Gilmour	Soundtrack from the film More	1969	5:18	
"Cluster One" †	Richard Wright; David Gilmour	Instrumental	The Division Bell	1994	5:56	
"Come In Number 51, Your Time Is Up" †	David Gilmour; Nick Mason; Roger Waters; Richard Wright	Vocalisations by Roger Waters & David Gilmour	Zabriskie Point	1970	5:01	
"Comfortably Numb"	David Gilmour; Roger Waters	Roger Waters; David Gilmour	The Wall	1979	6:23	
"Coming Back to Life"	David Gilmour	David Gilmour	The Division Bell	1994	6:19	
"Corporal Clegg"	Roger Waters	David Gilmour; Nick Mason; Richard Wright	A Saucerful of Secrets	1968	4:12	
"Country Song"	David Gilmour; Nick Mason; Roger Waters; Richard Wright	David Gilmour	Zabriskie Point	1970	4:37	
"Crumbling Land"	David Gilmour; Nick Mason; Roger Waters; Richard Wright	David Gilmour; Richard Wright	Zabriskie Point	1970	4:16	
"Crying Song"	Roger Waters	David Gilmour	Soundtrack from the film More	1969	3:38	
"Cymbaline"	Roger Waters	David Gilmour	Soundtrack from the film More	1969	4:50	
"David's Blues" †	David Gilmour	Instrumental	The Later Years	2019		
"Dogs"	David Gilmour; Roger Waters	David Gilmour; Roger Waters	Animals	1977	17:04	
"The Dogs of War"	David Gilmour; Anthony Moore	David Gilmour	A Momentary Lapse of Reason	1987	6:11	
"Doing It" †	David Gilmour; Nick Mason; Roger Waters; Richard Wright	Instrumental	The Early Years 1965–1972	2016	3:54	
"Don't Leave Me Now"	Roger Waters	Roger Waters	The Wall	1979	4:08	
"Double O Bo"	Syd Barrett	Syd Barrett	1965: Their First Recordings	2015	3:25	
"Dramatic Theme" †	Roger Waters; Richard Wright; David Gilmour; Nick Mason	Instrumental	Soundtrack from the film More	1969	2:15	
"Ebb and Flow" †	David Gilmour; Richard Wright	Instrumental	The Endless River	2014	1:55	
"Echoes"	David Gilmour; Nick Mason; Roger Waters; Richard Wright	David Gilmour; Richard Wright	Meddle	1971	23:30	
"Eclipse"	Roger Waters	Roger Waters	The Dark Side of the Moon	1973	2:12	
"Embryo"	Roger Waters	David Gilmour; High-pitched vocal gibberish by Roger Waters	Picnic – A Breath of Fresh Air	1970	4:39	
"Empty Spaces"	Roger Waters	Roger Waters	The Wall	1979	2:10	
"Eyes to Pearls" †	David Gilmour	Instrumental	The Endless River	2014	1:51	
"Fat Old Sun"	David Gilmour	David Gilmour	Atom Heart Mother	1970	5:22	
"Fearless"	David Gilmour; Roger Waters	David Gilmour	Meddle	1971	6:08	
"The Final Cut"	Roger Waters	Roger Waters	The Final Cut	1983	4:42	
"Flaming"	Syd Barrett	Syd Barrett	The Piper at the Gates of Dawn	1967	2:46	
"The Fletcher Memorial Home"	Roger Waters	Roger Waters	The Final Cut	1983	4:12	
"Footsteps" / "Doors" †	David Gilmour; Nick Mason; Roger Waters; Richard Wright	Instrumental	The Early Years 1965–1972	2016	3:12	
"Free Four"	Roger Waters	Roger Waters	Obscured by Clouds	1972	4:15	
"Get Your Filthy Hands Off My Desert"	Roger Waters	Roger Waters	The Final Cut	1983	1:17	
"Give Birth to a Smile"	Roger Waters	Roger Waters; Uncredited female singers	Music from The Body	1970	2:49	
"The Gnome"	Syd Barrett	Syd Barrett	The Piper at the Gates of Dawn	1967	2:13	
"The Gold It's in the..."	Roger Waters; David Gilmour	David Gilmour	Obscured by Clouds	1972	3:07	
"Goodbye Blue Sky"	Roger Waters	David Gilmour	The Wall	1979	2:45	
"Goodbye Cruel World"	Roger Waters	Roger Waters	The Wall	1979	1:16	
"The Grand Vizier's Garden Party" (Parts 1–3) †	Nick Mason	Instrumental	Ummagumma	1969	8:55	
"Grantchester Meadows"	Roger Waters	Roger Waters	Ummagumma	1969	7:23	
"A Great Day for Freedom"	David Gilmour; Polly Samson	David Gilmour	The Division Bell	1994	4:16	
"The Great Gig in the Sky"	Richard Wright; Clare Torry (Note: Torry received a writing credit after a lawsuit in 2004.)	Wordless vocals by Clare Torry	The Dark Side of the Moon	1973	4:44	
"Green Is the Colour"	Roger Waters	David Gilmour	Soundtrack from the film More	1969	2:58	
"The Gunner's Dream"	Roger Waters	Roger Waters	The Final Cut	1983	5:18	
"The Happiest Days of Our Lives"	Roger Waters	Roger Waters	The Wall	1979	1:46	
"The Hard Way" †	David Gilmour; Nick Mason; Roger Waters; Richard Wright	Instrumental	The Dark Side of the Moon (Immersion edition)	2011	3:09	
"Have a Cigar"	Roger Waters	Roy Harper	Wish You Were Here	1975	5:07	
"Heart Beat, Pig Meat" †	David Gilmour; Nick Mason; Roger Waters; Richard Wright	Instrumental	Zabriskie Point	1970	3:12	
"The Hero's Return"	Roger Waters	Roger Waters	The Final Cut	1983	2:43	
"Hey, Hey, Rise Up!" ‡	David Gilmour; Andriy Khlyvnyuk; Stepan Charnetskii	Andriy Khlyvnyuk	Non-album single	2022	3:27	
"Hey You"	Roger Waters	David Gilmour; Roger Waters	The Wall	1979	4:40	
"High Hopes"	David Gilmour; Polly Samson	David Gilmour; Spoken section by Charlie Gilmour & Steve O'Rourke	The Division Bell	1994	8:31	
"Hollywood" †	David Gilmour	Instrumental	The Early Years 1965–1972	2016	1:21	
"Ibiza Bar"	Roger Waters; Richard Wright; David Gilmour; Nick Mason	David Gilmour	Soundtrack from the film More	1969	3:19	
"If"	Roger Waters	Roger Waters	Atom Heart Mother	1970	4:31	
"I'm a King Bee"	Slim Harpo	Syd Barrett	1965: Their First Recordings	2015	3:07	
"In the Beechwoods" †	Syd Barrett	Instrumental	The Early Years 1965–1972	2016	4:43	
"In the Flesh"	Roger Waters	Roger Waters	The Wall	1979	4:15	
"In the Flesh?"	Roger Waters	Roger Waters	The Wall	1979	3:16	
"Interstellar Overdrive" †	Syd Barrett; Roger Waters; Richard Wright; Nick Mason	Instrumental	The Piper at the Gates of Dawn	1967	9:41	
"Is There Anybody Out There?"	Roger Waters	Roger Waters	The Wall	1979	2:44	
"It Would Be So Nice" ‡	Richard Wright	Richard Wright	Non-album single	1968	3:47	
"It's Never Too Late"	Roger Waters	Roger Waters	The Wall (Immersion edition)	2011	1:32	
"It's What We Do" †	David Gilmour; Richard Wright	Instrumental	The Endless River	2014	6:17	
"John Latham Version 1–9" †	Syd Barrett; Nick Mason; Roger Waters; Richard Wright	Instrumental	The Early Years 1965–1972	2016	30:26	
"Jugband Blues"	Syd Barrett	Syd Barrett	A Saucerful of Secrets	1968	3:00	
"Julia Dream" ‡	Roger Waters	David Gilmour	Non-album single B-side to "It Would Be So Nice"	1968	2:37	
"Keep Talking"	David Gilmour; Richard Wright; Polly Samson	David Gilmour; Spoken section by Stephen Hawking	The Division Bell	1994	6:11	
"Labyrinth" †	David Gilmour; Nick Mason; Roger Waters; Richard Wright	Instrumental	The Early Years 1965–1972	2016	1:10	
"The Labyrinths of Auximines" †	David Gilmour; Nick Mason; Roger Waters; Richard Wright	Instrumental	The Early Years 1965–1972	2016	3:20	
"The Last Few Bricks" †	Roger Waters; David Gilmour	Instrumental	Is There Anybody Out There? The Wall Live 1980–81	2000	3:26	
"Learning to Fly"	David Gilmour; Anthony Moore; Bob Ezrin; Jon Carin	David Gilmour; Spoken section by Nick Mason	A Momentary Lapse of Reason	1987	4:53	
"Let There Be More Light"	Roger Waters	Richard Wright; Roger Waters; David Gilmour	A Saucerful of Secrets	1968	5:38	
"The Lost Art of Conversation" †	Richard Wright	Instrumental	The Endless River	2014	1:42	
"Lost for Words"	David Gilmour; Polly Samson	David Gilmour	The Division Bell	1994	5:15	
"Louder than Words"	David Gilmour; Polly Samson	David Gilmour	The Endless River	2014	6:36	
"Love Scene (Version 4)" †	Richard Wright (Credited to David Gilmour, Nick Mason, Roger Waters, Richard Wright)	Instrumental	Zabriskie Point (Extended 1997 Release)	1997		
"Love Scene (Version 6)" †	David Gilmour; Nick Mason; Roger Waters; Richard Wright	Instrumental	Zabriskie Point (Extended 1997 Release)	1997		
"Lucifer Sam"	Syd Barrett	Syd Barrett	The Piper at the Gates of Dawn	1967	3:07	
"Lucy Leave"	Syd Barrett	Syd Barrett	1965: Their First Recordings	2015	2:57	
"Main Theme" †	Roger Waters; Richard Wright; David Gilmour; Nick Mason	Instrumental	Soundtrack from the film More	1969	5:27	
"Marooned" †	Richard Wright; David Gilmour	Instrumental	The Division Bell	1994	5:30	
"Marooned Jam" †	Richard Wright; David Gilmour	Instrumental	The Later Years	2019		
"Matilda Mother"	Syd Barrett	Richard Wright; Syd Barrett	The Piper at the Gates of Dawn	1967	3:08	
"Money"	Roger Waters	David Gilmour	The Dark Side of the Moon	1973	6:23	
"Moonhead" †	David Gilmour; Nick Mason; Roger Waters; Richard Wright	Instrumental	The Early Years 1965–1972	2016	7:16	
"More Blues" †	Roger Waters; Richard Wright; David Gilmour; Nick Mason	Instrumental	Soundtrack from the film More	1969	2:12	
"Mother"	Roger Waters	Roger Waters; David Gilmour	The Wall	1979	5:32	
"Mudmen" †	Richard Wright; David Gilmour	Instrumental	Obscured by Clouds	1972	4:20	
"Music from The Committee" (2 parts) †	David Gilmour; Nick Mason; Roger Waters; Richard Wright	Instrumental	The Early Years 1965–1972	2016	4:31	
"The Narrow Way" (Parts 1–3)	David Gilmour	David Gilmour	Ummagumma	1969	12:14	
"Nervana" †	David Gilmour	Instrumental	The Endless River	2014	5:30	
"A New Machine" (2 parts)	David Gilmour	David Gilmour	A Momentary Lapse of Reason	1987	2:24	
"Nick's Boogie" †	Nick Mason	Instrumental	Tonite Lets All Make Love in London (Extended 1990 Release)	1990		
"Night Light" †	David Gilmour; Richard Wright	Instrumental	The Endless River	2014	1:42	
"The Nile Song"	Roger Waters	David Gilmour	Soundtrack from the film More	1969	3:26	
"Nobody Home"	Roger Waters	Roger Waters	The Wall	1979	3:26	
"Not Now John"	Roger Waters	David Gilmour; Roger Waters	The Final Cut	1983	5:02	
"Nothing, Part 14" ("Echoes" work in progress)†	David Gilmour; Nick Mason; Roger Waters; Richard Wright	Instrumental	The Early Years 1965–1972	2016	7:01	
"Obscured by Clouds" †	Roger Waters; David Gilmour	Instrumental	Obscured by Clouds	1972	3:03	
"On Noodle Street" †	David Gilmour; Richard Wright	Instrumental	The Endless River	2014	1:42	
"On the Run" †	David Gilmour; Roger Waters	Instrumental	The Dark Side of the Moon	1973	3:45	
"On the Turning Away"	David Gilmour; Anthony Moore	David Gilmour	A Momentary Lapse of Reason	1987	5:39	
"One of My Turns"	Roger Waters	Roger Waters	The Wall	1979	3:41	
"One of the Few"	Roger Waters	Roger Waters	The Final Cut	1983	1:11	
"One of These Days" †	David Gilmour; Nick Mason; Roger Waters; Richard Wright	Spoken section by Nick Mason	Meddle	1971	5:57	
"One Slip"	David Gilmour; Phil Manzanera	David Gilmour	A Momentary Lapse of Reason	1987	5:06	
"Outside the Wall"	Roger Waters	Roger Waters	The Wall	1979	1:41	
"Paint Box" ‡	Richard Wright	Richard Wright	Non-album single B-side to "Apples and Oranges"	1967	3:33	
"Paranoid Eyes"	Roger Waters	Roger Waters	The Final Cut	1983	3:41	
"Party Sequence" †	Roger Waters; Richard Wright; David Gilmour; Nick Mason	Instrumental	Soundtrack from the film More	1969	1:07	
"Pigs (Three Different Ones)"	Roger Waters	Roger Waters	Animals	1977	11:28	
"Pigs on the Wing" (2 parts)	Roger Waters	Roger Waters	Animals	1977	2:48	
"A Pillow of Winds"	David Gilmour; Roger Waters	David Gilmour	Meddle	1971	5:13	
"Point Me at the Sky" ‡	David Gilmour; Roger Waters	David Gilmour; Roger Waters	Non-album single	1968	3:35	
"Poles Apart"	David Gilmour; Polly Samson; Nick Laird-Clowes	David Gilmour	The Division Bell	1994	7:03	
"The Post War Dream"	Roger Waters	Roger Waters	The Final Cut	1983	3:00	
"Pow R. Toc H." †	Syd Barrett; Roger Waters; Richard Wright; Nick Mason	Wordless vocals by Syd Barrett & Roger Waters	The Piper at the Gates of Dawn	1967	4:26	
"Quicksilver" †	Roger Waters; Richard Wright; David Gilmour; Nick Mason	Instrumental	Soundtrack from the film More	1969	7:13	
"Reaction in G" †	Syd Barrett; Nick Mason; Roger Waters; Richard Wright	Instrumental	The Early Years 1965–1972	2016	0:34	
"Remember a Day"	Richard Wright	Richard Wright	A Saucerful of Secrets	1968	4:33	
"Remember Me"	Syd Barrett	Syd Barrett	1965: Their First Recordings	2015	2:45	
"Rick's Theme" †	Richard Wright	Instrumental	The Later Years	2019		
"Roger's Boogie"	Roger Waters	Roger Waters	The Early Years 1965–1972	2016	4:35	
"Round and Around" †	David Gilmour	Instrumental	A Momentary Lapse of Reason	1987	1:06	
"Run Like Hell"	David Gilmour; Roger Waters	Roger Waters; David Gilmour	The Wall	1979	4:20	
"San Tropez"	Roger Waters	Roger Waters	Meddle	1971	3:44	
"A Saucerful of Secrets" †	Roger Waters; Richard Wright; Nick Mason; David Gilmour	Wordless vocals by David Gilmour & Richard Wright	A Saucerful of Secrets	1968	11:57	
"A Saucerful of Secrets" (live) †	David Gilmour; Nick Mason; Roger Waters; Richard Wright	Wordless vocals by David Gilmour & Richard Wright	Ummagumma	1969	12:51	
"The Scarecrow"	Syd Barrett	Syd Barrett	The Piper at the Gates of Dawn	1967	2:11	
"Scream Thy Last Scream"	Syd Barrett	Nick Mason; Syd Barrett	The Early Years 1965–1972	2016	4:43	
"Seabirds" †	Roger Waters	Instrumental	The Early Years 1965–1972	2016	4:20	
"Seamus"	David Gilmour; Nick Mason; Roger Waters; Richard Wright	David Gilmour; Howling by Seamus the dog	Meddle	1971	2:15	
"See Emily Play" ‡	Syd Barrett	Syd Barrett	Non-album single	1967	2:55	
"See-Saw"	Richard Wright	Richard Wright	A Saucerful of Secrets	1968	4:36	
"Set the Controls for the Heart of the Sun"	Roger Waters	Roger Waters	A Saucerful of Secrets	1968	5:28	
"Set the Controls for the Heart of the Sun" (live)	Roger Waters	Roger Waters	Ummagumma	1969	9:21	
"Several Species of Small Furry Animals Gathered Together in a Cave and Grooving with a Pict"	Roger Waters	Vocalisations by Roger Waters	Ummagumma	1969	4:47	
"Sexual Revolution"	Roger Waters	Roger Waters	The Wall (Immersion edition)	2011		
"Sheep"	Roger Waters	Roger Waters	Animals	1977	10:20	
"Shine On You Crazy Diamond" (Parts I–IX)	David Gilmour; Roger Waters; Richard Wright	Roger Waters	Wish You Were Here	1975	25:57	
"Skins" †	David Gilmour; Nick Mason; Richard Wright	Instrumental	The Endless River	2014	2:37	
"The Show Must Go On"	Roger Waters	David Gilmour	The Wall	1979	1:36	
"Signs of Life" †	David Gilmour; Bob Ezrin	Spoken section by Nick Mason	A Momentary Lapse of Reason	1987	4:22	
"Sleeping" †	David Gilmour; Nick Mason; Roger Waters; Richard Wright	Instrumental	The Early Years 1965–1972	2016	4:38	
"Slippery Guitar" †	David Gilmour	Instrumental	The Later Years	2019		
"Song 1" †	David Gilmour; Nick Mason; Roger Waters; Richard Wright	Instrumental	The Early Years 1965–1972	2016	3:18	
"Sorrow"	David Gilmour	David Gilmour	A Momentary Lapse of Reason	1987	8:45	
"Soundscape" †	David Gilmour; Nick Mason; Richard Wright	Instrumental	Pulse (Cassette edition only)	1995	21:53	
"Southampton Dock"	Roger Waters	Roger Waters	The Final Cut	1983	2:14	
"A Spanish Piece" †	David Gilmour	Vocalisations by David Gilmour	Soundtrack from the film More	1969	1:05	
"Speak to Me" †	Nick Mason	Instrumental	The Dark Side of the Moon	1973	1:07	
"Stay"	Richard Wright; Roger Waters	Richard Wright	Obscured by Clouds	1972	4:05	
"Stop"	Roger Waters	Roger Waters	The Wall	1979	0:30	
"Sum" †	David Gilmour; Nick Mason; Richard Wright	Instrumental	The Endless River	2014	4:48	
"Summer '68"	Richard Wright	Richard Wright; David Gilmour	Atom Heart Mother	1970	5:29	
"Surfacing" †	David Gilmour	Instrumental	The Endless River	2014	2:46	
"Sysyphus" (Parts 1–4) †	Richard Wright	Vocalisations by Richard Wright	Ummagumma	1969	13:32	
"Take It Back"	David Gilmour; Bob Ezrin; Polly Samson; Nick Laird-Clowes	David Gilmour	The Division Bell	1994	6:12	
"Take Up Thy Stethoscope and Walk"	Roger Waters	Roger Waters	The Piper at the Gates of Dawn	1967	3:05	
"Talkin' Hawkin'" †	David Gilmour; Richard Wright	Spoken section by Stephen Hawking	The Endless River	2014	3:29	
"TBS9" †	David Gilmour; Richard Wright	Instrumental	The Endless River	2014	2:27	
"TBS14" †	David Gilmour; Richard Wright	Instrumental	The Endless River	2014	4:11	
"Teacher Teacher"	Roger Waters	Roger Waters	The Wall (Immersion edition)	2011		
"Terminal Frost" †	David Gilmour	Instrumental	A Momentary Lapse of Reason	1987	6:16	
"The Thin Ice"	Roger Waters	David Gilmour; Roger Waters	The Wall	1979	2:27	
"The Thin Ice Reprise" †	Roger Waters	Instrumental	The Wall (Immersion edition)	2011		
"Things Left Unsaid" †	David Gilmour; Richard Wright	Spoken sections by Richard Wright, David Gilmour & Nick Mason	The Endless River	2014	4:26	
"Time"	Roger Waters; Nick Mason; Richard Wright; David Gilmour	David Gilmour; Richard Wright	The Dark Side of the Moon	1973	6:53	
"The Travel Sequence" †	David Gilmour; Nick Mason; Roger Waters; Richard Wright	Instrumental	The Dark Side of the Moon (Immersion edition)	2011	4:36	
"The Trial"	Roger Waters; Bob Ezrin	Roger Waters	The Wall	1979	5:13	
"Two Suns in the Sunset"	Roger Waters	Roger Waters	The Final Cut	1983	5:14	
"Unknown Song" †	David Gilmour; Nick Mason; Roger Waters; Richard Wright	Instrumental	Zabriskie Point (Extended 1997 Release)	1997		
"Unsung" †	Richard Wright	Instrumental	The Endless River	2014	1:07	
"Untitled" †	Richard Wright	Instrumental	The Endless River	2014	1:20	
"Up the Khyber" †	Nick Mason; Richard Wright	Instrumental	Soundtrack from the film More	1969	2:12	
"Us and Them"	Roger Waters; Richard Wright	David Gilmour; Richard Wright	The Dark Side of the Moon	1973	7:49	
"Vegetable Man"	Syd Barrett	Syd Barrett	The Early Years 1965–1972	2016	2:32	
"Vera"	Roger Waters	Roger Waters	The Wall	1979	1:35	
"Waiting for the Worms"	Roger Waters	Roger Waters; David Gilmour	The Wall	1979	4:04	
"Walk with Me Sydney"	Roger Waters	Syd Barrett; Roger Waters; Juliette Gale	1965: Their First Recordings	2015	3:11	
"Wearing the Inside Out"	Richard Wright; Anthony Moore	Richard Wright; David Gilmour	The Division Bell	1994	6:49	
"Welcome to the Machine"	Roger Waters	David Gilmour	Wish You Were Here	1975	7:25	
"What Do You Want from Me"	David Gilmour; Richard Wright; Polly Samson	David Gilmour	The Division Bell	1994	4:22	
"What Shall We Do Now?"	Roger Waters	Roger Waters	Is There Anybody Out There? The Wall Live 1980–81	2000	1:40	
"When the Tigers Broke Free" ‡	Roger Waters	Roger Waters	Non-album single later released on The Final Cut (2004 re-release)	1982	3:16	
"When You're In" †	Roger Waters; David Gilmour; Nick Mason; Richard Wright	Instrumental	Obscured by Clouds	1972	2:18	
"Wine Glasses" †	David Gilmour; Roger Waters; Richard Wright	Instrumental	Wish You Were Here (Experience and Immersion editions)	2011	2:11	
"Wish You Were Here"	David Gilmour; Roger Waters	David Gilmour	Wish You Were Here	1975	5:35	
"Wot's... Uh the Deal?"	Roger Waters; David Gilmour	David Gilmour	Obscured by Clouds	1972	5:08	
"Work" †	David Gilmour; Nick Mason; Roger Waters; Richard Wright	Instrumental	The Early Years 1965–1972	2016	4:12	
"Yet Another Movie"	David Gilmour; Patrick Leonard	David Gilmour	A Momentary Lapse of Reason	1987	6:17	
"Young Lust"	Roger Waters; David Gilmour	David Gilmour	The Wall	1979	3:25	
"Your Possible Pasts"	Roger Waters	Roger Waters	The Final Cut	1983	4:26	

== See also ==
- Pink Floyd discography
- List of unreleased songs recorded by Pink Floyd
- List of songs recorded by Syd Barrett

== Bibliography ==
- Fitch, Vernon (2005). The Pink Floyd Encyclopedia (3rd ed.). ISBN 1-894959-24-8.
