= The Final Cut (song) =

Song by Pink Floyd

- From the "Selections from The Final Cut" radio promotional single

Song by Pink Floyd

from the album The Final Cut
- Released: 21 March 1983
- Recorded: July–December 1982
- Genre: Art rock; progressive rock
- Length: 4:42
- Label: Harvest (UK); Columbia (US)
- Songwriter: Roger Waters
- Producers: Roger Waters; James Guthrie; Michael Kamen

Music video
- "The Final Cut" on YouTube

"The Final Cut" is the title track from Pink Floyd's twelfth studio album, The Final Cut (1983).

== Background ==
This song tells of a man's social isolation, clinical depression, sexual repression and social rejection. At the end of the song he attempts suicide but "never had the nerve to make the final cut".

It has been speculated by some listeners that the song may be told from the perspective of Pink, the main character of The Wall (1979), after the events of that album.

"The Final Cut" is one of four songs (along with "The Hero's Return", "One of the Few", and "Your Possible Pasts") used in The Final Cut that had been previously rejected from The Wall. This song is included in the video version of the album The Final Cut Video EP. The song made an appearance as the B-side of the "Selections from The Final Cut" radio promotional single (with "Your Possible Pasts" on the A-side.) It also appears in the American romantic science fiction comedy-drama film Strange Frame (2012).

== Personnel ==
Pink Floyd

- Roger Waters – vocals, bass guitar, acoustic guitar, tape effects
- David Gilmour – guitar, backing vocals
- Nick Mason – drums, tambourine

with:

- Michael Kamen – piano, harmonium, orchestrations
