= Country Song =

A country song is a work of country music.

Country Song may refer to:

- "Country Song" (Jake Bugg song), 2012
- "Country Song" (Pink Floyd song), 1997
- "Country Song" (Seether song), 2011

== See also ==
- National anthem, a patriotic musical composition
- Hot Country Songs, an American music chart
