= The Soldier (poem) =

1915 poem by Rupert Brooke

The Soldier

If I should die, think only this of me:
That there's some corner of a foreign field
That is for ever England. There shall be
In that rich earth a richer dust concealed;
A dust whom England bore, shaped, made aware,
Gave, once, her flowers to love, her ways to roam,
A body of England's, breathing English air,
Washed by the rivers, blest by suns of home.

And think, this heart, all evil shed away,
A pulse in the eternal mind, no less
Gives somewhere back the thoughts by England given;
Her sights and sounds; dreams happy as her day;
And laughter, learnt of friends; and gentleness,
In hearts at peace, under an English heaven.

"The Soldier" is a poem written by the English poet Rupert Brooke. It is the fifth and final sonnet in the sequence 1914, published posthumously in 1915 in the collection 1914 and Other Poems.

The manuscript is located at King's College, Cambridge.

== Structure of the poem ==
Written with fourteen lines in a Petrarchan sonnet form, the poem is divided into an opening octet, and then followed by a concluding sestet. The octet is rhymed after Shakespearean sonnets (ABAB CDCD), while the sestet follows rhyme scheme of the Petrarchan sonnets (EFG EFG).

This sonnet encompasses the future memorial of a soldier should he die in battle; he declares his patriotism by asserting that his Englishness will be buried with him forever where he lies in a foreign land. The poem appears not to follow the normal purpose of a Petrarchan sonnet. It does not go truly into detail about a predicament or resolution, as is customary with this form; rather, the atmosphere remains constantly in the blissful state of the English soldier.

== Cultural influence ==
Prior to the first Moon landing in 1969, William Safire prepared a speech for Richard Nixon to give in case of disaster. The last line of the prepared address echoes the second and third lines of the poem. The same lines were also used in the lyrics of Pink Floyd's "The Gunner's Dream" (1983, on The Final Cut) and Al Stewart's "Somewhere in England 1915" (2005, on A Beach Full of Shells).

The poem is read in its entirety in films Oh! What a Lovely War (1969) and All the King's Men (1999).
