= Sam Stone (song) =

Song by John Prine

from the album John Prine
- Released: July 1971
- Recorded: American Recording Studios, Memphis, Tennessee
- Genre: Folk
- Length: 4:14
- Label: Atlantic
- Songwriter: John Prine
- Producer: Arif Mardin

"Sam Stone" is a song written by John Prine about a drug-addicted veteran with a Purple Heart and his death by overdose. It appeared on Prine's eponymous 1971 debut album. The song was originally titled "Great Society Conflict Veteran's Blues".

The song is usually interpreted as a reference to the phenomenon of heroin or morphine addiction among Vietnam War veterans. A similar surge of addiction followed the Civil War, after which morphine addiction was known as "Soldiers' Disease". The song does not mention the Vietnam War, saying only that Sam returned from "serving in the conflict overseas".

There is a single explicit reference to morphine, but Prine alludes to heroin on several occasions including the use of the term "habit", slang commonly associated with heroin use, and the line "he popped his last balloon", very likely referring to one of the ways in which street heroin is commonly packaged – in small rubber balloons. The song's refrain begins, "There's a hole in Daddy's arm where all the money goes" and concludes with "Sweet songs never last too long on broken radios".

Time magazine reviewed the song on July 24, 1972. "Sam Stone" ranked eighth in a Rolling Stone magazine 2013 poll of the "ten saddest songs of all time". In June 2026, CBS News included the song in its list of the 250 essential American songs of the past 250 years.

== Background ==
In a 1978 interview with Songwriter magazine, Prine recalled that "Sam Stone" grew out of the line "There's a hole in daddy's arm / Where all the money goes", which came to him while he was working his mail route. He said he recognized that there was "a story to be told" and wrote the song that same day while still on the route. Because he was writing without a guitar, Prine said the words had to carry the tune, which helped give the song its sharp meter. When he returned home that night and played it with a guitar, he found that the melody was already in the words.

== Allusions to "Sam Stone" in other songs ==
Parts of the melody of "Sam Stone" were used by Roger Waters in the opening of "The Post War Dream", a song on Pink Floyd's 1983 album The Final Cut. The song is indirectly referenced in "Cop Shoot Cop...", which closes Spiritualized's 1997 album, Ladies and Gentlemen We Are Floating in Space – the lyrics "There's a hole in my arm where all the money goes/Jesus Christ died for nothing, I suppose," are almost identical to the memorable refrain of "Sam Stone".

== Cover versions ==
The song has been interpreted by numerous artists, including Swamp Dogg, Al Kooper, and Laura Cantrell, among others. Johnny Cash covered the song in a live concert, changing the line "Jesus Christ died for nothing, I suppose" to "Daddy must have hurt a lot back then, I suppose", and later "Daddy must have suffered a lot back then, I suppose". Prine explicitly gave Cash permission to change the line, although he also defended the original line as the "heart of the song" because "it means there’s no hope. If a veteran’s gonna come home to be treated like that and nobody’s gonna help him with his drug habit, then what’s the use in living?"

== Other recordings ==
- Theo Hakola on I Fry Mine in Butter! (2016)
- Bob Gibson on Bob Gibson (1970)
- Swamp Dogg on Cuffed, Collared, Tagged & Gassed (1972)
- Al Kooper on Naked Songs (1973)
- Laura Cantrell on Future Soundtrack for America (2004)
- Johnny Cash on Live from Austin, TX (2005)
- Evan Dando on "Live At The Brattle Theatre / Griffith Sunset EP" (2001)

== See also ==
"Soldier's Joy", a traditional song from the American Civil War with a similar theme, about morphine and opium. The chorus runs "25 cents for the whiskey, 15 cents for the beer/25 cents for the morphine, gonna get me out of here."
