= Discovery (Pink Floyd box set) =

Pink Floyd: Discovery

Box set by Pink Floyd
- Released: 26 September 2011
- Recorded: 1967–1993
- Genres: Progressive rock, psychedelic rock
- Length: 12:05:21
- Language: English
- Label: EMI
- Producers: Bob Ezrin; David Gilmour; James Guthrie; Michael Kamen; Norman Smith; Pink Floyd; Roger Waters

Pink Floyd chronology
Oh, by the Way (2007)	Pink Floyd: Discovery (2011)	The Best of Pink Floyd: A Foot in the Door (2011)

Professional ratings
Review scores
Source	Rating
Allmusic	4/5 stars
BBC Music	Not rated

Pink Floyd: Discovery is a compilation CD box set by Pink Floyd released on 26 September 2011 to launch the Why Pink Floyd...? re-release campaign. The box set includes all of their standard studio albums released by this point. All albums were newly remastered by James Guthrie and Joel Plante. In addition to the albums the set comes with a 60-page artwork booklet designed by Storm Thorgerson.

== Contents ==
All albums and their corresponding original release dates are given below. Refer to original albums for track listings, personnel and production credits.

1. The Piper at the Gates of Dawn (August 1967)
2. A Saucerful of Secrets (June 1968)
3. More (June 1969)
4. Ummagumma (October 1969)
5. Atom Heart Mother (October 1970)
6. Meddle (gate fold) (October 1971)
7. Obscured by Clouds (June 1972)
8. The Dark Side of the Moon (March 1973)
9. Wish You Were Here (September 1975)
10. Animals (January 1977)
11. The Wall (November 1979)
12. The Final Cut (March 1983)
13. A Momentary Lapse of Reason (September 1987)
14. The Division Bell (March 1994)

== Charts ==
Chart (2011–12)	Peak position
Austrian Albums (Ö3 Austria)	61
Belgian Albums (Ultratop Flanders)	39
Belgian Albums (Ultratop Wallonia)	14
Dutch Albums (Album Top 100)	57
Finnish Albums (Suomen virallinen lista)	42
French Albums (SNEP)	55
German Albums (Offizielle Top 100)	9
Italian Albums (FIMI)	38
Portuguese Albums (AFP)	23
Spanish Albums (Promusicae)	53
Swedish Albums (Sverigetopplistan)	43
Swiss Albums (Schweizer Hitparade)	24
UK Albums (Official Charts)	112
US Billboard 200	175
