= When the Tigers Broke Free =

Original song written and composed by Roger Waters

Single by Pink Floyd
- B-side: "Bring the Boys Back Home"
- Released: 26 July 1982
- Recorded: November 1981 – March 1982
- Genre: Progressive rock
- Length: 3:16
- Label: Harvest (UK); Columbia (US)
- Songwriter: Roger Waters
- Producers: Roger Waters; David Gilmour; James Guthrie; Michael Kamen

Pink Floyd singles chronology
"Comfortably Numb" (1980)	"When the Tigers Broke Free" (1982)	"Not Now John" (1983)

Official audio
- "When the Tigers Broke Free" on YouTube

"When the Tigers Broke Free" is a song by the English rock band Pink Floyd, written by Roger Waters. It describes the death of his father, Eric Fletcher Waters, on 18 February 1944, during the Battle of Anzio during the Italian campaign of the Second World War.

== Writing and recording ==
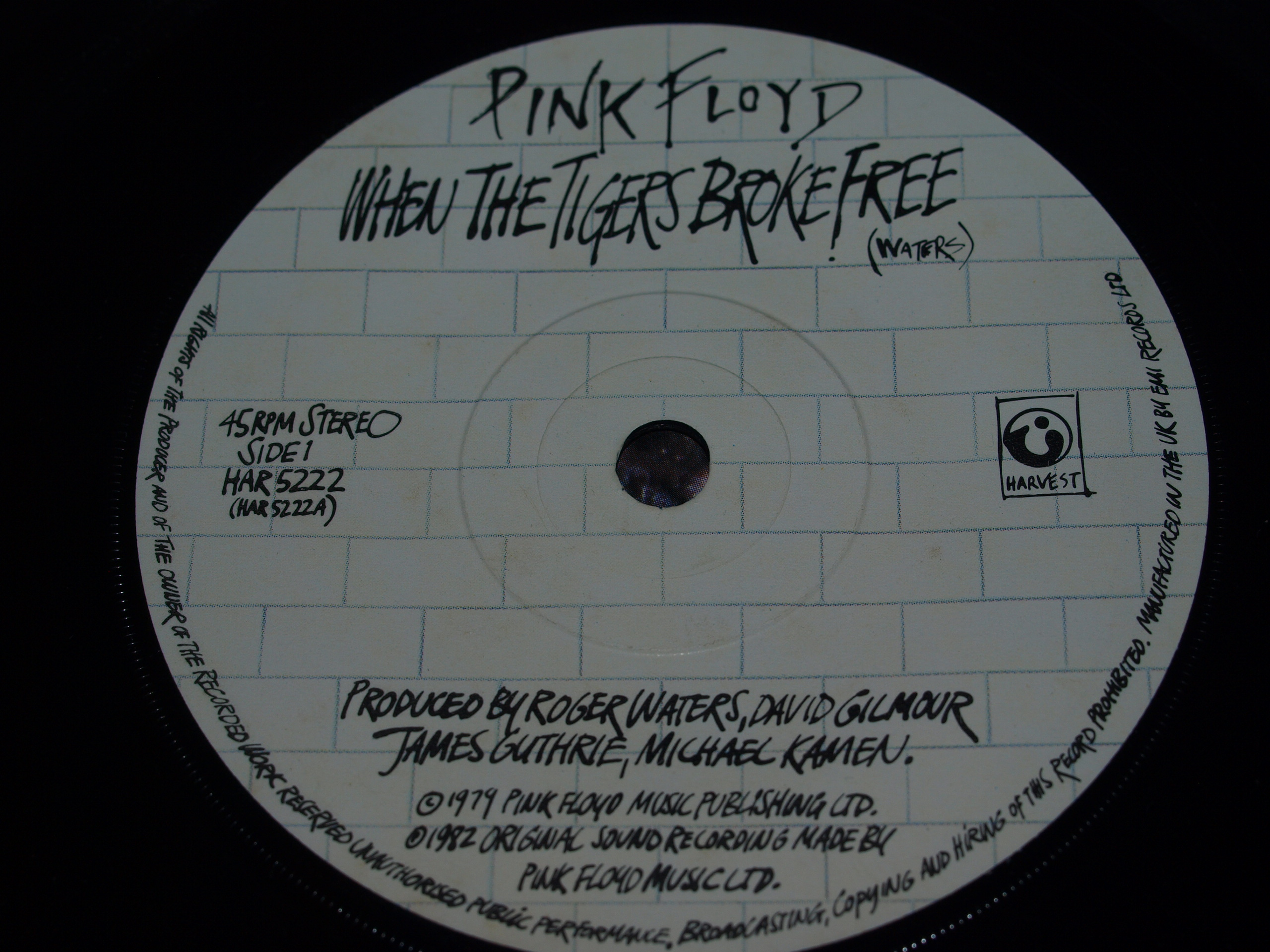
Label of the UK single release.

The song was originally titled "Anzio, 1944". Its working title was "When the Tigers Break Through". It was written at the same time as The Wall, hence its copyright date of 1979, and was originally intended to be part of that album, but was rejected by the other members of the band on the grounds that it was too personal. It was subsequently recorded and released on a 7" single on 26 July 1982 (running time 3:00), before appearing in the film version of The Wall. The 7" was labelled "Taken from the album The Final Cut" but was not included on that album until the 2004 remaster.

The single version is a unique mix and differs from the versions that appear in the film and all subsequent releases. It has a different intro that is shorter than most other versions. The first verse uses a different vocal take that has never appeared on any other release of the track. This recording also features different percussion accents — short snare roll fills throughout the track.

== Lyrics ==
The song sets up the story premise for The Wall film, set over footage recreating the British contribution to Operation Shingle, where American and British troops landed on the beaches near Anzio, Italy, with the goal of liberating Rome from Nazi German control. These forces included Z Company of the 8th Battalion, Royal Fusiliers, in which Waters' father Eric served. As Waters tells it, the forward commander had asked to withdraw his forces from a German Tiger I tank assault, but the generals refused, and "the generals gave thanks / As the other ranks / Held back the enemy tanks for a while" and "the Anzio bridgehead was held for the price / Of a few hundred ordinary lives" as the German assault inflicted heavy losses including Eric Waters.

In the second verse of the song (which makes up the reprise later in The Wall film), Waters describes how he found a letter of condolence from the British government, described as a note from George VI in the form of a gold leaf scroll which "His Majesty signed / with his own rubber stamp." Waters' resentment then explodes in the final line "And that's how the High Command took my daddy from me."

The underlying theme of the song is one of the primary catalysts for the character Pink's descent into social isolation throughout the story of The Wall, especially in the film version.

On 18 February 2014, 70 years to the day after his father was killed at Anzio, Waters unveiled a memorial to the 8th Battalion, and his father, near to the site of the battle. Another monument had already been erected at the approximate spot where his father fell. After many years of not knowing the details of what happened on that fateful day, Waters was finally able to get some closure after 93-year-old Fusilier and Anzio veteran Harry Shindler uncovered precise details of the time and place of Waters' father's death. Both of them were present at the unveiling of the memorial.

Waters has indicated that his father was originally a conscientious objector during the outbreak of the Second World War. However, as the German expansion grew, Waters' father felt compelled to join the British Armed Forces. Waters goes on to say, "So he went back to the conscription board in London and told them he had changed his mind. He was commissioned as a second lieutenant in the Royal Fusiliers, which is how he ended up here 70 years ago. He believed he was involved in a necessary fight against the Nazis, and for that he paid the ultimate price."

== Subsequent releases ==
The song made its first CD appearance on a promotional disc in conjunction with Roger Waters' 1990 live performance of The Wall at Potsdamer Platz in Berlin, Germany. This was the Pink Floyd recording from the original 1982 single, and had a running time of 3 minutes.

It was generally released on CD on Pink Floyd's 2001 compilation album Echoes: The Best of Pink Floyd. With a duration of 3:42, this version is longer than the single release and features an extended intro section. There is less percussion heard in the Echoes mix, and the male voice choir comes in much earlier than it does in the single version.

The next time the song appeared was on the 2004 re-released, remastered version of The Final Cut, where it was placed between "One of the Few" and "The Hero's Return", this time an edited version of 3:16. This mix is similar to that of the Echoes version, but with a shorter intro.

== Film version ==
=== Part 1 ===
The first verse is played during the opening of the film, where Pink's father is cleaning and loading a revolver while smoking a cigarette as he hears bombers fly overhead. The film then transitions into the song "In the Flesh?", showing his fate.

=== Part 2 ===
The second verse is played after the song "Another Brick in the Wall, Part 1" while Pink is shown discovering his father's uniform, straight razor and bullets, along with the letter of condolence. He then puts on the uniform, and it cuts between his father doing the same.

== Critical reception ==
In a review for The Final Cut, Patrick Schabe of PopMatters believed the addition of "When the Tigers Broke Free" to The Final Cut enhanced the album, specifically "making it easier to fathom the imagery of 'The Hero's Return'". Schabe also believed the track "draws a direct line between 'One of the Few''s exhortations to 'teach' and a moment captured in history – the story of Waters' father's death."

== Charts ==
Chart (1982)	Peak position
UK Singles (OCC)	39

== Personnel ==
Pink Floyd

- Roger Waters – vocals

with:

- Orchestra conducted and arranged by Michael Kamen
- The Pontarddulais Male Voice Choir led by Noel Davis

== See also ==
- List of anti-war songs
