= Pig Meat =

Pig Meat may refer to:

- Pork, the meat of a pig
- Pigmeat Markham (1904–1981), American entertainer

== See also ==
- "Heart Beat, Pig Meat", a 1970 song by Pink Floyd
