= The Best of Pink Floyd =

The Best of Pink Floyd may refer to:

- The Best of the Pink Floyd, a 1970 compilation album
- Echoes: The Best of Pink Floyd, a 2001 compilation album
- The Best of Pink Floyd: A Foot in the Door, a 2011 compilation album
