= Oh, by the Way =

Box set by Pink Floyd
- Released: 10 December 2007
- Recorded: 1967–1994
- Genres: Progressive rock, psychedelic rock
- Length: 12:01:40
- Label: EMI
- Producers: Bob Ezrin; David Gilmour; James Guthrie; Michael Kamen; Norman Smith; Pink Floyd; Roger Waters

Pink Floyd chronology
| Echoes: The Best of Pink Floyd (2001) | Oh, by the Way (2007) | Pink Floyd: Discovery (2011) |

Professional ratings
Review scores
| Source | Rating |
|---|---|
| Allmusic | 4/5 stars |
| The Encyclopedia of Popular Music | 3/5 stars |
| Pitchfork Media | (4.0/10) |

Oh, by the Way is a compilation box set by Pink Floyd released on 10 December 2007, by EMI Records in the United Kingdom and the following day in the United States through Capitol Records.

== Contents ==
The boxed set includes all of Pink Floyd's then extant standard studio albums in scale replicas of the original vinyl packaging. In addition to the albums, and their extras, the set comes with a specially designed 40th Anniversary poster by Storm Thorgerson, featuring 40 Pink Floyd images.

== Design and cover ==
The title is a reference to a line in the song "Have a Cigar": "Oh by the way, which one's Pink?" The box cover consists of a concept similar to that of Ummagumma—one side of the box shows a picture of a room with various objects scattered about inside it, with pictures of Roger Waters, David Gilmour, Nick Mason and Richard Wright on the walls, whilst the other side shows the same room in different lighting, with the objects and pictures of band members rearranged. Standing in the background of both sides of the cover is the dark silhouette of an individual, to symbolize Syd Barrett.

== Albums ==
Albums, packaging format, and original release date. Refer to original albums for track lists, personnel lists, and production credits.

1. The Piper at the Gates of Dawn (single wallet) August 1967 (1994 remaster) (stereo version, although the disc label and sleeve have the mono catalogue number).
2. A Saucerful of Secrets (single wallet) June 1968 (listed as 1992 remaster, but is actually the earlier 1986 master)
3. Soundtrack from the Film More (single wallet) June 1969 (1994 remaster)
4. Ummagumma (gatefold, two discs) October 1969 (1994 remaster)
5. Atom Heart Mother (gatefold) October 1970 (1994 remaster)
6. Meddle (gatefold) October 1971 (listed as 1992 remaster, but is actually the earlier 1984 master)
7. Obscured by Clouds (single wallet with rounded corners) June 1972 (1994 remaster)
8. The Dark Side of the Moon (gatefold with two posters and two stickers) March 1973 (2003 remaster)
9. Wish You Were Here (single wallet with liner, postcard, and black shrink wrap) September 1975 (1992 remaster)
10. Animals (gatefold) January 1977 (listed as 1992 remaster, but is actually the earlier 1985 master)
11. The Wall (gatefold, two discs) November 1979 (1992 remaster)
12. The Final Cut (gatefold) March 1983 (version with 2004 track list) (2004 remaster)
13. A Momentary Lapse of Reason (gatefold) September 1987 (1997 remaster)
14. The Division Bell (gatefold) March 1994 (not remastered)

== Personnel ==
Pink Floyd

- Syd Barrett – lead guitar, vocals (albums 1 and 2)
- David Gilmour – guitars, bass guitar, keyboards, vocals (albums 2–14)
- Nick Mason – drums, percussion, vocals (all albums)
- Roger Waters – bass guitar, vocals (albums 1–12)
- Rick Wright – keyboards, piano, synthesizer, Hammond organ, vocals (all albums except 12)

Production

- James Guthrie – remastering production
- Aubrey Powell – sleeve design
- Doug Sax – remastering
- Storm Thorgerson – sleeve design
