= Hyde Park and Regent's Park bombings =

1982 IRA attack in London, England

- Part of the Troubles
- Aftermath of the Hyde Park bombing, which killed four soldiers and seven horses
- Location: Hyde Park bombing: 51°30′11.0″N 0°09′21.2″W; Regent's Park bombing: 51°31′35.6″N 0°09′26.8″W; Hyde Park and Regent's Park, London, England
- Date: 20 July 1982; 10:43 am – 12:55 pm
- Target: British military personnel
- Attack type: Bombings
- Deaths: 11 (4 Hyde Park, 7 Regents Park)
- Injuries: At least 59 injured (28 Hyde Park, 31 Regents Park)
- Perpetrator: Provisional Irish Republican Army

The Hyde Park and Regent's Park bombings were carried out on 20 July 1982 in London, England. Members of the Provisional Irish Republican Army (IRA) detonated two improvised explosive devices during British military ceremonies in Hyde Park and Regent's Park, both in central London.

The explosions killed eleven military personnel: four soldiers of the Blues and Royals at Hyde Park, and seven bandsmen of the Royal Green Jackets at Regent's Park. Seven of the Blues and Royals' horses were also killed in the attack. One seriously injured horse, Sefton, survived, was featured on television programmes, and was awarded "Horse of the Year".

In 1987, Gilbert "Danny" McNamee was convicted of making the Hyde Park bomb and jailed for 25 years. He served 12 years before being released under the terms of the Good Friday Agreement; his conviction was later quashed. In 2013, IRA member John Downey was charged with four counts of murder in relation to the Hyde Park attack; his trial began in January 2014, but collapsed the following month after a ruling upon a letter sent to him by the Police Service of Northern Ireland assuring him that he would not be prosecuted over the attack. On 18 December 2019, the High Court ruled in a civil case that John Downey was an "active participant" in the bombing.

No one has ever been charged in connection with the Regent's Park bombing.

== The attacks ==
=== Hyde Park bombing ===
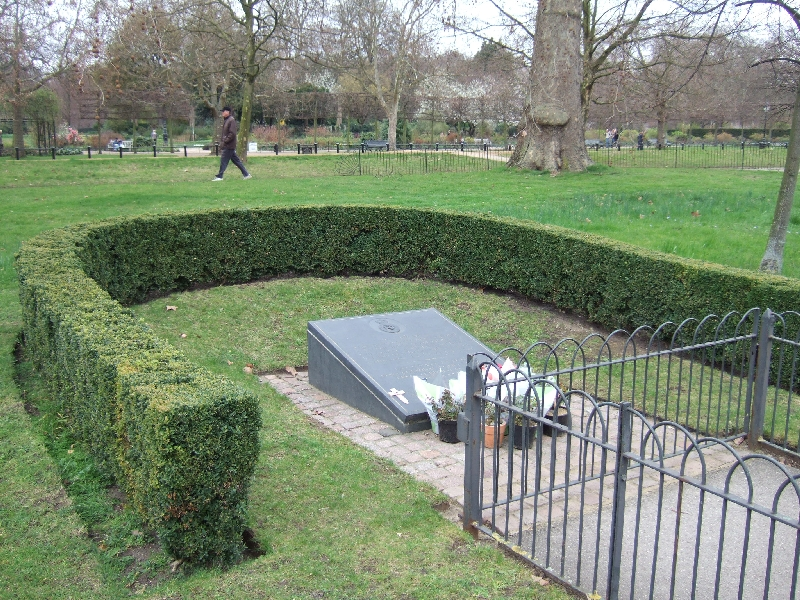
Memorial in Hyde Park

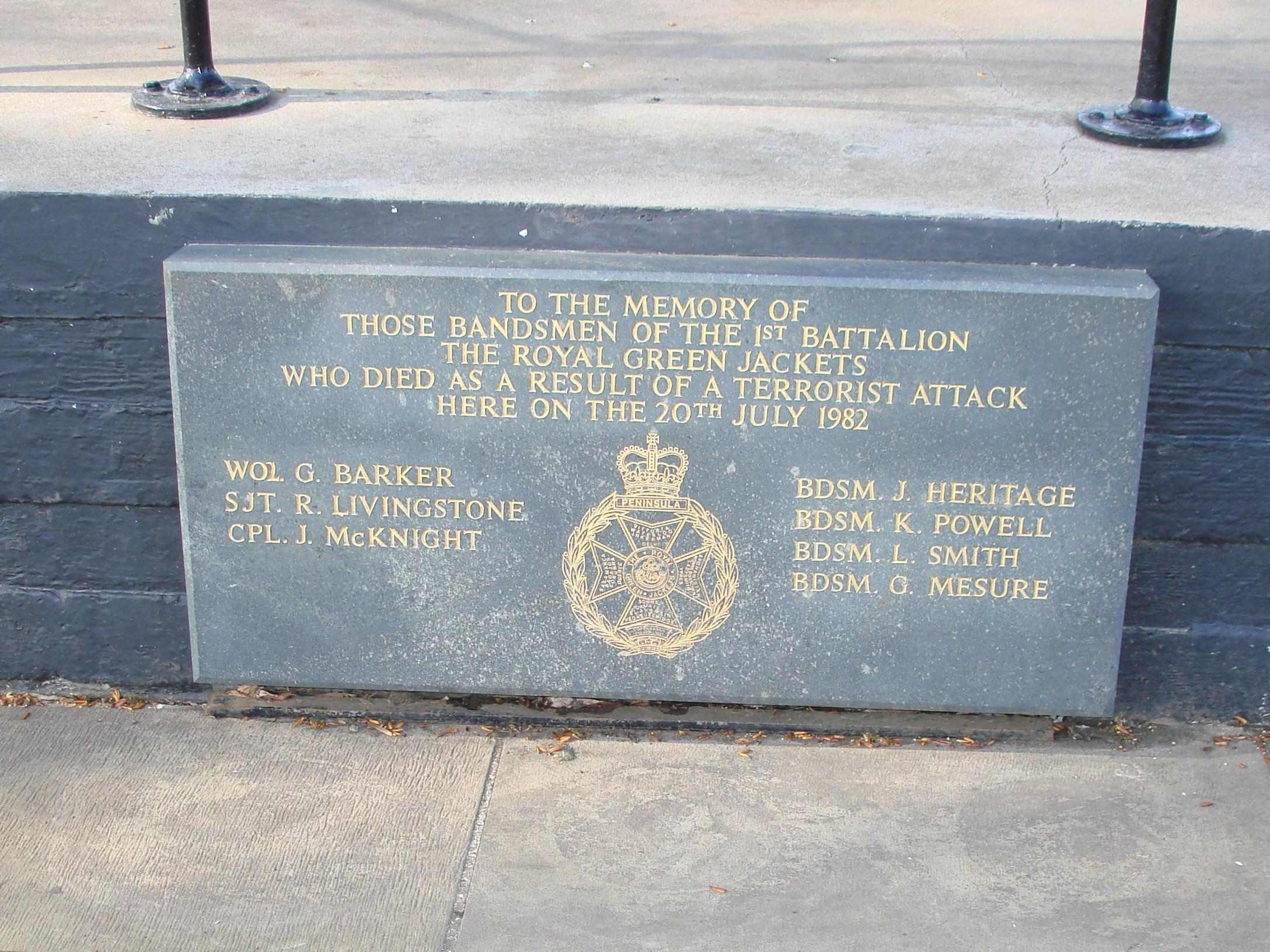
Memorial in Regent's Park

At 10:43 am, a nail bomb exploded in the boot of a blue Morris Marina parked on South Carriage Drive in Hyde Park. The bomb comprised 25 lb (11 kg) of gelignite and 30 lb (14 kg) of nails. It exploded as soldiers of the Household Cavalry, Queen Elizabeth II's official bodyguard regiment, were passing. They were taking part in their daily Changing of the Guard procession from their barracks in Knightsbridge to Horse Guards Parade. Three soldiers of the Blues and Royals were killed immediately, and another, their standard-bearer, died from his wounds three days later. The other soldiers in the procession were badly wounded, and a number of civilians were injured. Seven of the regiment's horses were also killed or had to be euthanised because of their injuries. Explosives experts believed that the Hyde Park bomb was remotely triggered by an IRA member inside the park.

=== Regent's Park bombing ===
The second attack happened at 12:55 pm, when a bomb exploded underneath a bandstand in Regent's Park. Thirty military bandsmen of the Band of the 1st Battalion, Royal Green Jackets were on the stand performing music from Oliver! to a crowd of 120 people.

It was the first in a series of advertised lunchtime concerts there. Six of the bandsmen were killed outright and the rest were wounded; a seventh died of his wounds on 1 August. At least eight civilians were also injured. The bomb had been hidden under the stand some time before and triggered by a timer. Unlike the Hyde Park bomb, it contained no nails and seemed to be designed to cause minimal harm to bystanders.

== Aftermath ==
At least 51 people were injured, and a total of 22 people were admitted to hospital as a result of the blasts: 18 soldiers, a police officer, and three civilians. The IRA claimed responsibility for the attacks by deliberately mirroring Prime Minister Margaret Thatcher's words a few months before when Britain entered the Falklands War, proclaiming that "the Irish people have sovereign and national rights which no task or occupational force can put down". Reacting to the bombing, Thatcher stated: "These callous and cowardly crimes have been committed by evil, brutal men who know nothing of democracy. We shall not rest until they are brought to justice."

The bombings weakened public support in the United States for the Irish republican cause. The CIA and the FBI ramped up their anti-IRA activity, and public opinion polls showed that sympathy for the IRA in particular, and Irish re-unification in general, plummeted in the United States in response to the attacks. Charles Haughey, Taoiseach of Ireland, said: "Those responsible for these inhuman crimes do irreparable damage to the good name of Ireland and the cause of Irish unity."

Sefton, a horse that survived the attack at Hyde Park despite suffering serious wounds, became famous after appearing in many television shows and was awarded Horse of the Year. Sefton's rider at the time of the bombing, Michael Pedersen, survived but he told his doctor that he was suffering from post-traumatic stress disorder; after leaving his wife, he committed suicide in September 2012 after stabbing two of his children to death.

A memorial marks the spot of the Hyde Park bombing; and the troop honours it daily with an eyes-left and salute with drawn swords. A plaque commemorating the victims of the second attack stands in Regent's Park.

The event was alluded to in the 1983 Pink Floyd song "The Gunner's Dream" (from the album The Final Cut), where a dying RAF gunner dreams of a world where "maniacs don't blow holes in bandsmen by remote control". A 1986 album by experimental musicians Coil was inspired in part by an apocalyptic nightmare, linked to the bombings, that the band's songwriter and vocalist, John Balance, had. The front cover of the album, Horse Rotorvator, featured a photo of the Regent's Park bandstand, taken by Balance.

== Criminal proceedings ==
In October 1987, 27-year-old Gilbert "Danny" McNamee, from County Armagh, was sentenced at the Old Bailey to 25 years in prison for his alleged role in the Hyde Park bombing and others. In December 1998, shortly after his release from the Maze prison under the Good Friday Agreement, three Court of Appeal judges quashed his conviction, deeming it "unsafe" because the forensic analysis linking him to the bombing was flawed, and because of withheld fingerprint evidence that implicated other bomb-makers. They stated that though the conviction was unsafe it did not mean McNamee was necessarily innocent of the charge.

On 19 May 2013, 61-year-old John Anthony Downey, from County Donegal, was charged with murder in relation to the Hyde Park bomb and intending to cause an explosion likely to endanger life. He appeared by videolink from Belmarsh prison for a bail hearing at the Old Bailey on 24 May, and did not apply for bail, so was remanded in custody. At a hearing on 1 August 2013, Downey was granted conditional bail and a trial was scheduled for January 2014.

On 24 January 2014, Downey appeared at the Old Bailey for the beginning of his trial; he entered a not guilty plea on the four murder charges and the charge of intending to cause an explosion. On 25 February 2014, it was revealed that Downey's trial had collapsed after the presiding judge had ruled, on 21 February, upon a letter sent by the Police Service of Northern Ireland to Downey in 2007, assuring him that he would not face criminal charges over the attack. Although the assurance was made in error and the police realised the mistake, it was never withdrawn, and the judge ruled that therefore the defendant had been misled and prosecuting him would be an abuse of executive power. Downey is one of 187 IRA suspects who received secret on-the-run letters guaranteeing them unofficial immunity from prosecution. In December 2019 the High Court ruled, in a civil action against Downey by the family of a victim, that he had been an "active participant" in the Hyde Park bombing, subject to a claim for damages.
