= The Fletcher Memorial Home =

Song by Pink Floyd

from the album The Final Cut
- Released: 21 March 1983
- Recorded: July–December 1982
- Genre: Art rock; progressive rock; spoken word
- Length: 4:12
- Label: Harvest (UK); Columbia (US)
- Songwriter: Roger Waters
- Producers: Roger Waters; James Guthrie; Michael Kamen

Music video
- "The Fletcher Memorial Home" on YouTube

"The Fletcher Memorial Home" is a song written by Roger Waters, and performed by the English rock band Pink Floyd. The song appears on their twelfth studio album, The Final Cut (1983). It is the eighth track on the album and is arranged between "Get Your Filthy Hands Off My Desert" and "Southampton Dock". The song is also featured on Pink Floyd's compilation albums Echoes: The Best of Pink Floyd (2001) and The Best of Pink Floyd: A Foot in the Door (2011).

== History ==
The song is about Waters' frustration with the leadership of the world since the Second World War, mentioning many world leaders by name (Ronald Reagan, Alexander Haig, Menachem Begin, Margaret Thatcher, Ian Paisley, Leonid Brezhnev, Joseph McCarthy and Richard Nixon), suggesting that these "colonial wasters of life and limb" be segregated into a specially-founded retirement home. It labels all the world leaders as "overgrown infants" and "incurable tyrants" and suggests they are incapable of understanding anything other than violence or their own faces on a television screen.

In its concluding lines, the narrator of the song gathers all of the "tyrants" inside the Fletcher Memorial Home and imagines applying "the Final Solution" to them.

Fletcher in the name of the song is in honour and remembrance of Roger Waters' father, Eric Fletcher Waters, who was killed during the Second World War in Anzio, Italy.

The Fletcher Memorial Home scenes in The Final Cut film were filmed at the manor house Forty Hall in Enfield, north London.

== Critical reception ==
In a review for The Final Cut, Patrick Schabe of PopMatters described "The Fletcher Memorial Home" as "majestic, but clunky". Critic Mike Cormack calls it "one of the most arresting tracks on The Final Cut, chilling in its demand for lethal restitution, but clear-eyed about the atrocities inflicted by world leaders."

== Personnel ==
Pink Floyd

- Roger Waters – vocals, bass guitar
- David Gilmour – guitar
- Nick Mason – drums

with:

- The National Philharmonic Orchestra conducted and arranged by Michael Kamen
- Michael Kamen – piano

== See also ==
- Ronald Reagan in music
