= Box set =

Compilation of various media or other items packaged in a box

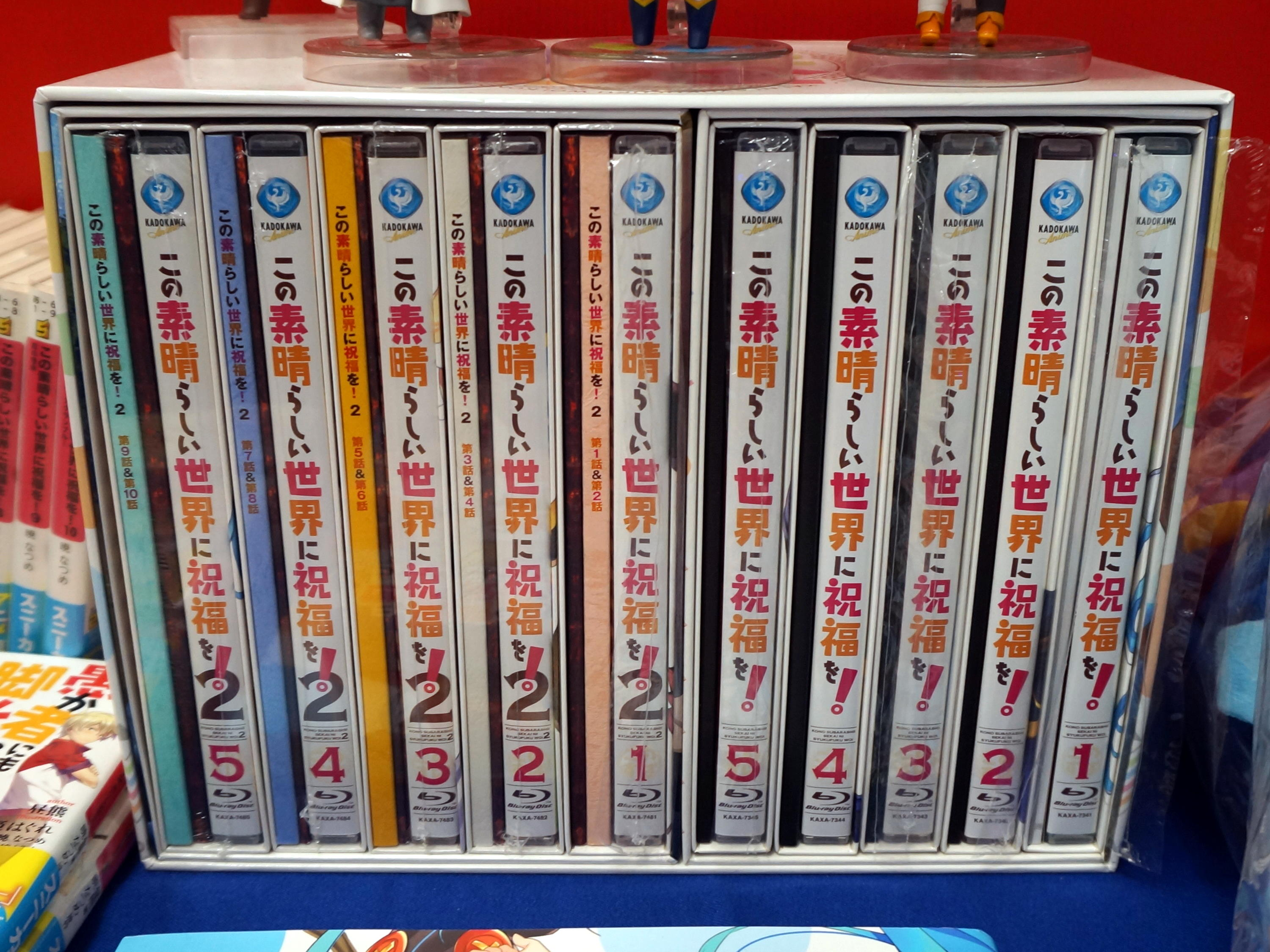
A boxed set of the Japanese anime television series KonoSuba on Blu-ray

A boxed set, or box set (American English), is a set of items (for example, a collection of books, musical recordings, films or television programs) traditionally packaged in a box, hence 'boxed', and offered for sale as a single unit.

== Music ==
Artists and bands with a long and successful career often have anthology or "essential" collections of their music released as boxed sets. These often include rare and never-before-released tracks. Some boxed sets collect previously released singles or albums by a music artist, and often collect the complete discography of an artist, such as Pink Floyd's Oh, by the Way and Discovery sets. Sometimes bands release expanded versions of their most successful albums, such as Pink Floyd's Immersion versions of their The Dark Side of the Moon (1973), Wish You Were Here (1975) and The Wall (1979) boxes. Pink Floyd have also released The Early Years 1965–1972 boxed set, which features mostly unreleased material.

Other music boxed sets compile different artists from a particular genre such as big band jazz, 1960s rock and roll, or opera. They generally feature a collection of various hits from some of the top artists of a particular genre. The scope of such boxed sets varies widely, with some genre-specific boxed sets (such as one featuring rock music) focusing on a specific style (for instance, guitar rock or "Summer of Love" music). Two of the companies best known for making boxed sets are Legacy Recordings and Rhino Records; both have won multiple Grammy Awards. Prior to Rhino and Legacy, companies such as Time-Life Records and Reader's Digest also issued boxed sets.

In rare cases, boxed sets contain all original material, such as the 11-disc set Blue Guitars by Chris Rea, In Search of The, a 13-disc set by Buckethead, or Klaus Schulze's 10-disc set Contemporary Works I. Some boxed sets become best sellers, such as Led Zeppelin's Led Zeppelin (1990), George Strait's Strait Out of the Box (1995), Nirvana's With the Lights Out (2004) and The Beatles' twin The Beatles (The Original Studio Recordings) and The Beatles in Mono discography boxed sets (2009).

In classical music, boxed sets often contain all works of a certain composer or all works in a certain genre, like symphonies or chamber music, performed by a certain orchestra, ensemble or conductor.

== Books ==
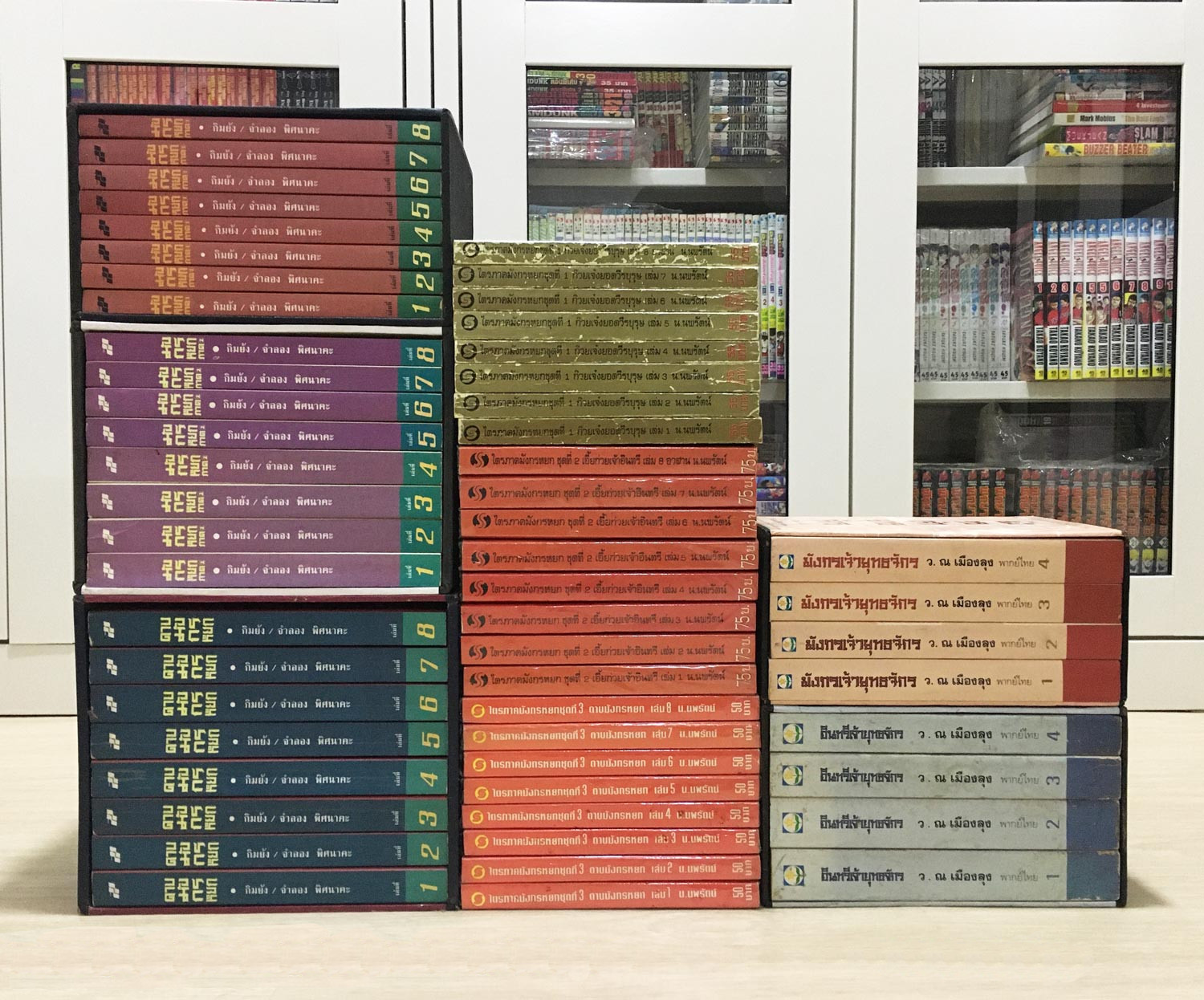
Boxed collections of books

Well-known authors and artists who have written or produced several related books or portfolios of fine art photography or other artistic mediums whose work is considered historically, culturally, or socially significant may have certain works sold as boxed sets. For example, one can buy boxed sets of the plays of Shakespeare, collections of J. R. R. Tolkien novels, or Ansel Adams photographic prints. There are now also digital boxed set collections, such as 21 Shades of Night.

== Television and film ==
Films, television and other video programs on Blu-ray and DVD are sometimes sold as boxed sets, as were certain titles on the now-discontinued VHS and LaserDisc formats. Such a boxed set might include an entire season or seasons, or the complete series, of a popular TV program, a collection of films by a well-known director or starring a well-known actor/actress, or a collection of films of a particular genre such as horror, sci-fi or westerns. Other criteria for boxed sets have included all films of a series such as the Star Wars series or the Lord of the Rings trilogy, and a selection of adaptions of a particular author such as Stephen King or Jane Austen. Some boxed sets contain different versions of one film, as in the case of Blade Runner and Alien Quadrilogy.

One of the most popular boxed sets of all time is "The Nightmare on Elm Street Collection" released in 1999 by New Line Platinum Series, which contained the original seven films, a bonus DVD containing special features titled The Nightmare Series Encyclopedia, two pairs of 3-D glasses for the last ten minutes of Freddy's Dead: The Final Nightmare, a commemorative booklet about the films titled The Nightmare is Alive and more. Other notable boxed sets include the Dragon Ball "Dragon Box" sets, often considered to be the best release of the shows to date due to the high quality of the remasters and the plentiful number of features; the "Shirley Temple Little Darling" DVD collection, an 18-DVD boxed set of Shirley Temple films which were constantly advertised on TV for years as a "limited time offer"; and the "Star Wars Trilogy: The Definitive Collection" LaserDisc boxed set, which was one of the last home-video releases of the original trilogy before the special editions.

In the context of streaming services such as Netflix, the term "boxed set" often refers, particularly but not exclusively in Commonwealth English, to a series or season where all episodes are available to watch on demand, either in addition to or in place of traditional scheduling.

== See also ==
- Volume (bibliography)
