= Echoes: The Best of Pink Floyd =

- Cover used on the original UK & European vinyl copies

Greatest hits album by Pink Floyd
- Released: 5 November 2001
- Recorded: 1967–1993
- Genres: Progressive rock; psychedelic rock
- Length: 155:23; 155:13 (vinyl version)
- Label: EMI
- Producers: James Guthrie; Pink Floyd

Pink Floyd chronology
Is There Anybody Out There? The Wall Live 1980–81 (2000)	Echoes: The Best of Pink Floyd (2001)	Oh, by the Way (2007)

Echoes: The Best of Pink Floyd is the fourth compilation album by the English rock band Pink Floyd, released on 5 November 2001 by EMI internationally and a day later by Capitol Records in the United States. It debuted at No. 2 on the Billboard 200 album chart on 24 November 2001, with sales of 214,650 copies. It remained on the chart for 26 weeks. The album was certified gold, platinum and double platinum on 6 December 2001 in the US by the RIAA. It was certified triple platinum in the US on 8 January 2002, and quadruple platinum on 10 September 2007.

== Contents ==
The compilation spans the career of Pink Floyd from their first single "Arnold Layne" in 1967, through to "High Hopes", the final track from their 1994 studio album The Division Bell. Original frontman Syd Barrett is featured on six of the album's 26 tracks, providing lead vocals on five. Five of the band's albums—More, Ummagumma, Atom Heart Mother and Obscured by Clouds, and The Endless River —are not represented, though multiple tracks from Atom Heart Mother and Ummagumma were planned to appear on the compilation. Each of the 26 tracks fades from one to the next with no break in the music, courtesy of longtime producer/engineer James Guthrie, to help recreate the concept album feel of the band's mid-period work. All 26 tracks were newly remastered specifically for this compilation and are not sequenced in chronological order. The compilation opens and closes the same as the band's first album The Piper at the Gates of Dawn, with the tracks "Astronomy Domine" and "Bike" respectively.

The band's longtime guitarist, David Gilmour, said of the process of compiling the tracks themselves:

There’s been the occasional phone call but no great brainstorming sessions to get us all together. All our stuff [is] conducted through our engineer James Guthrie, who coordinated Echoes from his place in Lake Tahoe.

Roger Waters's main contribution was the name of the compilation. "I had to, because the name the boys came up with was so awful. What was it? 'Sum of the Parts'. See what I mean?"

== Cover ==
Alternate cover used for certain releases and rereleases

Storm Thorgerson, who had done the majority of album covers for Pink Floyd, did the Echoes art which features recursive windows in multiple regressions as a nod to his own cover for 1969's Ummagumma, and the objects on each landscape refer to the Pink Floyd discography. For instance, the man on fire from Wish You Were Here, another wearing the Delicate Sound of Thunder lightbulb suit, dolls of the Atom Heart Mother cow and the Animals pig, a bike and both a brick wall and the hammers from The Wall. Eventually Thorgerson opted to make two images, with another used for the back cover. To create the idea on a photograph, various walls—which had varied measurements and angles to ensure that "nothing seemed to fit other than by eye through the lens."—were built and put in a country landscape in Sussex. Actors, props and fittings were set in and between those walls. The original design was one of two sketches submitted for Dream Theater's 1997 album Falling into Infinity, with the original being framed and hanging in the home of Dream Theater drummer Mike Portnoy and is pointed out by Portnoy in his Hudson Music instructional drum DVD In Constant Motion.

== Release ==
Professional ratings
Review scores
Source	Rating
AllMusic	4/5 stars
The Encyclopedia of Popular Music	4/5 stars

Echoes is Floyd's first album to include "When the Tigers Broke Free", from the film version of The Wall (the song reappeared on a 2004 rerelease of The Final Cut in a slightly remixed form). It was their first compilation to include songs from The Final Cut, A Momentary Lapse of Reason and The Division Bell and is the only one to include "Echoes", from 1971's Meddle.

With first-week sales of 215,000—beating their previous first-week peak of 198,000 for Pulse—the album hit number two on the Billboard 200, behind Britney Spears' Britney (746,000). In 2001 the album was the 16th best-selling album globally, selling 4.8 million copies.

A week after the band's one-off reunion at Live 8 in 2005, HMV said sales of Echoes rose by 1343%.

== Track listing ==
"We’ve been arguing about it [track selection] since May. Nick sent us a list right at the beginning, then he seemed to lose interest. Rick never seemed to want to get involved in it. It wandered along rather fitfully until recently, when I thought I'd better work out what we should be trying to do with it, whether we should try and represent every album or not, and on what basis we should be choosing songs. In the end we had to get everyone to vote on a list. (...) I agree [that most of the songs seemed to have picked themselves]. When I look at it, it's bloody obvious really. It's amazing how long the process has been getting it sorted out."

— David Gilmour

=== CD version ===
==== Disc one ====
No.	Title	Writer(s)	Lead vocals	Length
1.	"Astronomy Domine" (The Piper at the Gates of Dawn (1967))	Syd Barrett	Barrett; Richard Wright	4:10
2.	"See Emily Play" ("See Emily Play" single (1967), with an early cut-off; appears on 1971 Relics (1971), and 1967 US/Japan versions of The Piper at the Gates of Dawn)	Barrett	Barrett	2:47
3.	"The Happiest Days of Our Lives" (The Wall (1979))	Roger Waters	Waters	1:38
4.	"Another Brick in the Wall (Part 2)" (The Wall)	Waters	David Gilmour; Waters	4:01
5.	"Echoes" (Edited version; Meddle (1971))	Gilmour; Waters; Wright; Nick Mason	Gilmour; Wright	16:30
6.	"Hey You" (The Wall)	Waters	Gilmour; Waters	4:39
7.	"Marooned" (excerpt; The Division Bell (1994))	Gilmour; Wright	Instrumental	2:02
8.	"The Great Gig in the Sky" (The Dark Side of the Moon (1973))	Wright; Clare Torry	Torry	4:40
9.	"Set the Controls for the Heart of the Sun" (A Saucerful of Secrets (1968))	Waters	Waters	5:20
10.	"Money" (The Dark Side of the Moon)	Waters	Gilmour	6:29
11.	"Keep Talking" (Early fade-out; The Division Bell)	Gilmour; Wright; Polly Samson	Gilmour	5:57
12.	"Sheep" (Early fade-out; Animals (1977))	Waters	Waters	9:46
13.	"Sorrow" (A Momentary Lapse of Reason (1987))	Gilmour	Gilmour	8:45
Total length:				76:44

==== Disc two ====
No.	Title	Writer(s)	Lead vocals	Length
1.	"Shine On You Crazy Diamond (Parts 1–7)" (Edited version; Wish You Were Here (1975))	Gilmour, Waters, Wright	Waters	17:32
2.	"Time" (includes "Breathe (In the Air) (Reprise)"); The Dark Side of the Moon)	Gilmour, Waters, Wright, Mason	Gilmour, Wright	6:48
3.	"The Fletcher Memorial Home" (The Final Cut (1983))	Waters	Waters	4:07
4.	"Comfortably Numb" (includes the coda of "Bring the Boys Back Home"; The Wall)	Gilmour, Waters	Gilmour, Waters	6:53
5.	"When the Tigers Broke Free" (The Wall film soundtrack (1982), also on remasters of The Final Cut since 2004)	Waters	Waters	3:42
6.	"One of These Days" (Meddle, edited version)	Gilmour, Waters, Wright, Mason	Instrumental, with spoken words by Mason	5:15
7.	"Us and Them" (Edited ending, The Dark Side of the Moon)	Waters, Wright	Gilmour, Wright	7:51
8.	"Learning to Fly" (A Momentary Lapse of Reason)	Gilmour, Anthony Moore, Bob Ezrin, Jon Carin	Gilmour	4:50
9.	"Arnold Layne" ("Arnold Layne" single (1967); appears on Relics)	Barrett	Barrett	2:52
10.	"Wish You Were Here" (Early fade-out; Wish You Were Here)	Gilmour, Waters	Gilmour	5:21
11.	"Jugband Blues" (A Saucerful of Secrets)	Barrett	Barrett	2:56
12.	"High Hopes" (Edited version; The Division Bell (1994))	Gilmour, Samson	Gilmour	6:59
13.	"Bike" (with bell intro; The Piper at the Gates of Dawn (1967))	Barrett	Barrett	3:24
Total length:				78:30

=== Vinyl version ===
Side A
No.	Title	Writer(s)	Original album	Length
1.	"Astronomy Domine"	Barrett	The Piper at the Gates of Dawn	4:10
2.	"See Emily Play"	Barrett	See Emily Play - Single; appears on Relics, 1971 and 1967 US/Japan versions of The Piper at the Gates of Dawn	2:47
3.	"The Happiest Days of Our Lives"	Waters	The Wall	1:38
4.	"Another Brick in the Wall (part 2)"	Waters	The Wall	4:01
5.	"Marooned" (Edited version)	Gilmour, Wright	The Division Bell	2:02
6.	"The Great Gig in the Sky"	Wright, Torry	The Dark Side of the Moon	4:40
Total length:				19:18

Side B
No.	Title	Writer(s)	Original album	Length
1.	"Echoes" (Edited version)	Gilmour, Waters, Wright, Mason	Meddle	16:30
2.	"Hey You"	Waters	The Wall	4:39
Total length:				21:09

Side C
No.	Title	Writer(s)	Original album	Length
1.	"Set the Controls for the Heart of the Sun"	Waters	A Saucerful of Secrets	5:20
2.	"Money"	Waters	The Dark Side of the Moon	6:29
3.	"Keep Talking" (Early fade-out)	Gilmour, Wright, Samson	The Division Bell	5:57
Total length:				17:46

Side D
No.	Title	Writer(s)	Original album	Length
1.	"Sheep" (Early fade-out)	Waters	Animals	9:46
2.	"Sorrow"	Gilmour	A Momentary Lapse of Reason	8:45
Total length:				18:31

Side E
No.	Title	Writer(s)	Original album	Length
1.	"Shine On You Crazy Diamond" (Parts 1–7, edited version)	Gilmour, Waters, Wright	Wish You Were Here	17:32
Total length:				17:32

Side F
No.	Title	Writer(s)	Original album	Length
1.	"Time" (Includes "Breathe" (reprise))	Gilmour, Waters, Wright, Mason	The Dark Side of the Moon	6:48
2.	"The Fletcher Memorial Home"	Waters	The Final Cut	4:07
3.	"Comfortably Numb" (Includes the coda of "Bring the Boys Back Home" The Wall)	Gilmour, Waters	The Wall	6:53
4.	"When the Tigers Broke Free"	Waters	The Wall film soundtrack, also on 2004-present remasters of The Final Cut	3:42
Total length:				21:30

Side G
No.	Title	Writer(s)	Original album	Length
1.	"One of These Days" (Edited version)	Gilmour, Waters, Wright, Mason	Meddle	5:15
2.	"Us and Them"	Waters, Wright	The Dark Side of the Moon	7:51
3.	"Learning to Fly"	Gilmour, Moore, Ezrin, Carin	A Momentary Lapse of Reason	4:50
4.	"Arnold Layne"	Barrett	Arnold Layne - Single; appears on Relics	2:52
Total length:				20:48

Side H
No.	Title	Writer(s)	Original album	Length
1.	"Wish You Were Here" (Early fade-out)	Gilmour, Waters	Wish You Were Here	5:21
2.	"Jugband Blues"	Barrett	A Saucerful of Secrets	2:56
3.	"High Hopes" (Edited version)	Gilmour, Samson	The Division Bell	6:59
4.	"Bike"	Barrett	The Piper at the Gates of Dawn	3:24
Total length:				18:40

== Rejected songs ==
According to James Guthrie, the following songs were considered for inclusion:

- "Interstellar Overdrive" (Barrett, Waters, Wright, Mason) The Piper at the Gates of Dawn, 1967
- "Chapter 24" (Barrett) The Piper at the Gates of Dawn, 1967
- "The Scarecrow" (Barrett) The Piper at the Gates of Dawn, 1967
- "Careful with That Axe, Eugene" (Waters, Wright, Gilmour, Mason) B-side of "Point Me at the Sky", 1968; also appears on Relics
- "Grantchester Meadows" (Waters) Ummagumma, 1969
- An edited version of "Atom Heart Mother" (Waters, Wright, Gilmour, Mason, Geesin) Atom Heart Mother, 1970
- "If" (Waters) Atom Heart Mother, 1970
- "Fat Old Sun" (Gilmour) Atom Heart Mother, 1970
- "Fearless" (Gilmour, Waters) Meddle, 1971
- "San Tropez" (Waters) Meddle, 1971
- "Breathe" (Waters, Gilmour, Wright) The Dark Side of the Moon, 1973
- "Brain Damage" (Waters) The Dark Side of the Moon, 1973
- "Eclipse" (Waters) The Dark Side of the Moon, 1973
- "Dogs" (Waters, Gilmour) Animals, 1977
- "Mother" (Waters) The Wall, 1979
- "Young Lust" (Waters, Gilmour) The Wall, 1979
- "Nobody Home" (Waters) The Wall, 1979
- "Your Possible Pasts" (Waters) The Final Cut, 1983
- "The Gunner's Dream" (Waters) The Final Cut, 1983
- "Paranoid Eyes" (Waters) The Final Cut, 1983

== Personnel ==
Pink Floyd

- Syd Barrett – guitar and lead vocals on "Astronomy Domine", "See Emily Play", "Arnold Layne", "Jugband Blues" and "Bike", guitar on "Set the Controls for the Heart of the Sun"
- Roger Waters – bass, rhythm guitar on "Sheep", tape effects, lead vocals on "The Happiest Days of Our Lives", "Another Brick in the Wall, Part II", "Hey You", "Set the Controls for the Heart of the Sun", "Sheep", "Shine on You Crazy Diamond", "Comfortably Numb", "The Fletcher Memorial Home", "When the Tigers Broke Free", backing vocals
- David Gilmour – guitars, fretless bass guitar on "Hey You", bass guitar on "Sheep", "High Hopes", and "One of These Days", keyboards, drum programming on "Sorrow", lead vocals on "Another Brick in the Wall, Part II", "Echoes", "Hey You", "Money", "Keep Talking", "Sorrow", "Time", "Comfortably Numb", "Us and Them", "Learning to Fly", "Wish You Were Here", "High Hopes", backing vocals
- Richard Wright – keyboards, Hammond organ, piano, synthesizers, clavinet, co-lead vocals on "Astronomy Domine", "Echoes", "Time", "Us and Them", backing vocals
- Nick Mason – drums, percussion, tape effects, vocalisations on "One of These Days"

Additional personnel

- Sam Brown – backing vocals on "Keep Talking"
- Jon Carin – additional keyboards on "Marooned" and "Keep Talking", keyboards on "Learning to Fly" and piano on "High Hopes"
- Lesley Duncan – backing vocals on "Time" and "Us and Them"
- Venetta Fields – backing vocals on "Shine On You Crazy Diamond"
- Donnie Gerard – backing vocals on "Sorrow" and "Learning to Fly"
- James Guthrie – percussion on "The Happiest Days of Our Lives"
- Doug Sax, James Guthrie, Joel Plante – remastering at The Mastering Lab
- Robert Hadley – transfers
- Islington Green School – choir on "Another Brick in the Wall (Part 2)"
- Michael Kamen – orchestrations
- Carol Kenyon – backing vocals on "Keep Talking"
- Darlene Koldenhoven – backing vocals on "Sorrow" and "Learning to Fly"
- Tony Levin – bass guitar on "Sorrow" and "Learning to Fly"
- Durga McBroom – backing vocals on "Keep Talking"
- Dick Parry – saxophones on "Money", "Us and Them", and "Shine On You Crazy Diamond"
- Pontarddulais Male Voice Choir led by Noel Davis – choir on "When the Tigers Broke Free"
- Guy Pratt – bass on "Marooned" and "Keep Talking"
- The Salvation Army (The International Staff Band) on "Jugband Blues":
  - Ray Bowes (cornet)
  - Terry Camsey (cornet)
  - Mac Carter (trombone)
  - Les Condon (E♭ bass)
  - Maurice Cooper (euphonium)
  - Ian Hankey (trombone)
  - George Whittingham (B♭ bass)
  - One other uncredited musician
- Phyllis St. James – backing vocals on "Sorrow" and "Learning to Fly"
- Barry St. John – backing vocals on "Time" and "Us and Them"
- Liza Strike – backing vocals on "Time" and "Us and Them"
- Storm Thorgerson – cover design
- Clare Torry – vocals on "The Great Gig in the Sky"
- Doris Troy – backing vocals on "Time" and "Us and Them"
- Carmen Twillie – backing vocals on "Sorrow" and "Learning to Fly"
- Gary Wallis – percussion on "Keep Talking"
- Carlena Williams – backing vocals on "Shine On You Crazy Diamond"

== Charts ==
=== Weekly charts ===
Weekly chart performance for Echoes: The Best of Pink Floyd
Chart (2001–2002)	Peak position
Australian Albums (ARIA)	4
Austrian Albums (Ö3 Austria)	2
Belgian Albums (Ultratop Flanders)	2
Belgian Albums (Ultratop Wallonia)	3
Canadian Albums (Billboard)	2
Danish Albums (Hitlisten)	3
Dutch Albums (Album Top 100)	3
Finnish Albums (Suomen virallinen lista)	16
German Albums (Offizielle Top 100)	1
Greek Albums (IFPI Greece)	1
Hungarian Albums (MAHASZ)	34
Irish Albums (IRMA)	2
Italian Albums (FIMI)	1
New Zealand Albums (RMNZ)	1
Norwegian Albums (VG-lista)	2
Polish Albums (ZPAV)	4
Portuguese Albums (AFP)	1
Scottish Albums (Official Charts)	2
Spanish Albums (AFYVE)	6
Swedish Albums (Sverigetopplistan)	3
Swiss Albums (Schweizer Hitparade)	3
UK Albums (Official Charts)	2
US Billboard 200	2

=== Year-end charts ===
2001 year-end chart performance for Echoes: The Best of Pink Floyd
Chart (2001)	Position
Australian Albums (ARIA)	59
Austrian Albums (Ö3 Austria)	54
Belgian Albums (Ultratop Flanders)	61
Belgian Albums (Ultratop Wallonia)	49
Canadian Albums (Nielsen SoundScan)	25
Dutch Albums (Album Top 100)	55
German Albums (Offizielle Top 100)	71
Swedish Albums (Sverigetopplistan)	26
Swiss Albums (Schweizer Hitparade)	44
UK Albums (OCC)	25
Worldwide Albums (IFPI)	13

2002 year-end chart performance for Echoes: The Best of Pink Floyd
Chart (2002)	Position
Austrian Albums (Ö3 Austria)	46
Canadian Albums (Nielsen SoundScan)	92
German Albums (Offizielle Top 100)	80
Swiss Albums (Schweizer Hitparade)	64
UK Albums (OCC)	146
US Billboard 200	44

== Certifications and sales ==
Certifications and sales for Echoes: The Best of Pink Floyd
Region	Certification	Certified units/sales
Argentina (CAPIF)	Platinum	40,000^{^}
Australia (ARIA)	Platinum	70,000^{^}
Belgium (BRMA)	Platinum	50,000^{*}
Canada (Music Canada)	6× Platinum	600,000^{^}
Denmark (IFPI Danmark)	Gold	25,000^{^}
France (SNEP)	Platinum	300,000^{*}
Germany (BVMI)	Gold	150,000^{^}
Greece (IFPI Greece)	Platinum	30,000^{^}
Italy 2001 sales	—	400,000
Italy (FIMI) sales since 2009	Gold	25,000^{*}
New Zealand (RMNZ)	3× Platinum	45,000^{^}
Poland (ZPAV)	Gold	50,000^{*}
Spain (Promusicae)	Platinum	100,000^{^}
Sweden (GLF)	Gold	40,000^{^}
Switzerland (IFPI Switzerland)	Platinum	40,000^{^}
United Kingdom (BPI)	3× Platinum	900,000^{^}
United States (RIAA)	4× Platinum	2,000,000^{^}
Summaries
Europe (IFPI)	3× Platinum	3,000,000^{*}
^{*} Sales figures based on certification alone.^{^} Shipments figures based on certification alone.
