= Unknown Song =

Instrumental by Pink Floyd

from the album Zabriskie Point
- Released: 1997
- Recorded: 1969
- Genre: Instrumental rock, progressive rock
- Length: 6:01
- Label: MCA
- Songwriters: David Gilmour; Rick Wright; Nick Mason; Roger Waters

"Unknown Song" is an instrumental track written and recorded by the British progressive rock group Pink Floyd. It has been released only on a bonus disc included in the 1997 re-release of the soundtrack to Michelangelo Antonioni's movie Zabriskie Point.

== Music ==
The track is simple and consists of melodies that were used later; the riff that starts to play at 1:54 is a faster tempo version of the "Funky Dung" section of "Atom Heart Mother Suite". The main melody played by acoustic 12-string guitar throughout the song is somewhat typical to the band's later style – "A Pillow of Winds" or even "Brain Damage" can be heard as followers of the song's melodies.

== Other names ==
"Unknown Song" is sometimes called "Rain in the Country" or "Country Rain" on bootleg recordings. A similar piece entitled "Baby Blue Shuffle in D Major" appeared in a 2 December 1968 BBC radio broadcast and shares melodies with part one of "The Narrow Way" from Ummagumma, but it may have been rather a different – or even the same – take of "Unknown Song". "Rain in the Country" Take 2 ends in "Crumbling Land", which has similar music. The music of "Country Song/The Red Queen Theme" Take 1 is also similar. A similar instrumental is named "Love Scene" Ver 7 in The Early Years 1965–1972: Devi/ation.

== See also ==
- Crumbling Land
- Country Song/The Red Queen Theme
