= Danny McNamee =

N.Irish electronic engineer (b.1960)

Gilbert "Danny" McNamee (born 29 September 1960) is a former electronic engineer from Crossmaglen, Northern Ireland, who was wrongly convicted in 1987 of conspiracy to cause explosions, including the Provisional Irish Republican Army's (IRA) Hyde Park bombing on 20 July 1982.

McNamee was arrested on 16 August 1986 at his home in Crossmaglen by the British Army and Royal Ulster Constabulary, then flown to London and charged with conspiracy to cause explosions. At his trial at the Old Bailey, he denied even having sympathy for the IRA, and no evidence was ever presented that he had any paramilitary links. Additionally, the IRA itself stated that he was not a member, and never claimed him as a "prisoner of war". However, his fingerprints were found on bomb components recovered from two IRA arms caches, one of which the prosecution claimed had "common characteristics" with the bomb used in Hyde Park, and allegedly on another bomb which was detonated in Phillimore Gardens in 1983. At his trial, he explained that he may have handled the circuits when working for a previous employer, who he did not know had IRA connections. After five hours of deliberation by the jury, McNamee was found guilty on all charges and sentenced to 25 years in prison.

In September 1994, McNamee and Paul Magee were among six prisoners who escaped from Whitemoor Prison, shooting and wounding a prison officer as they did so, before being captured two hours later. He was released from prison in November 1998 under the Good Friday Agreement, having served less than half of his sentence. McNamee was the first prisoner convicted of terrorism to be released under the Agreement.

In 1997, his case was examined by Channel 4's Trial and Error programme. McNamee was later to be the first case referred to the Court of Appeal by the Criminal Cases Review Commission, and his conviction was overturned on 17 December 1998 after the discovery of forensic evidence which had not been made available to McNamee's defence at his trial. The court heard expert evidence showing that the "common characteristics" between the Hyde Park bomb and the components which McNamee's fingerprints were found on did not prove they were from the same device, undermining the prosecution's claim that he was "the maker of the Hyde Park bomb", and that the fingerprint from the Phillimore Gardens bomb may not have belonged to McNamee. Additionally, McNamee's defence revealed that other, much more prominent, fingerprints had been found on the same circuits, belonging to known IRA bomb-maker Dessie Ellis (who received a ten-year sentence in Ireland for possession of explosives after the bombings, but before McNamee's trial). Despite quashing McNamee's conviction, the appeal judges stated that "The Crown makes a strong case that the appellant [McNamee] was guilty of a conspiracy to cause explosions." Supporters of the campaign to clear his name included the comedian Jeremy Hardy.

In February 1999, McNamee read the IRA Roll of Honour at the Burns and Moley commemoration and the following month he sat with the Caraher family during the trial of Michael Caraher and other members of the Provisional IRA South Armagh Brigade sniper team.
