= Your Possible Pasts =

- From the "Selections from the Final Cut" promo single (mislabeled as "Your Impossible Pasts")

Song by Pink Floyd

from the album The Final Cut
- Released: 21 March 1983
- Recorded: July–December 1982
- Genre: Art rock; hard rock
- Length: 4:26
- Label: Harvest (UK); Columbia (US)
- Songwriter: Roger Waters
- Producers: Roger Waters; James Guthrie; Michael Kamen

Official audio
- "Your Possible Pasts" on YouTube

"Your Possible Pasts" (mislabeled as "Your Impossible Pasts" on a radio promo single) is a song from Pink Floyd's twelfth studio album The Final Cut (1983). This song was one of several to be considered for the band's "best of" album, Echoes: The Best of Pink Floyd (2001). Released as a promo single, It reached No. 8 on the US mainstream rock chart.

== Background ==
The song, like many others on The Final Cut, is a rewritten version of a song rejected for The Wall (1979), originally to be used in Spare Bricks (an early version of The Final Cut that was an extension of The Wall.) Guitarist David Gilmour objected to the use of these previously rejected tracks, as he believed that they weren't good enough for release:

[Roger Waters] wasn't right about wanting to put some duff tracks on The Final Cut. I said to Roger, "If these songs weren't good enough for The Wall, why are they good enough now?"

Despite not appearing on The Wall album, the lyrics of the chorus did appear in the film for said album, Pink Floyd – The Wall (1982), where the lyrics were read by the main character, Pink, in-between the songs "Waiting for the Worms" and "Stop".

"Your Possible Pasts" also appeared on a 12-inch promotional single entitled Selections from The Final Cut, with "The Final Cut" on the B-side. However, despite not being released as a commercial single, the song did receive significant radio play, resulting in the song hitting number 8 on the Billboard Mainstream Rock chart in America.

== Lyrics ==
The first verse describes poppies entwining with "cattle trucks lying in wait for the next time", an allusion to the railway vehicles used in the Holocaust.

The line "Do you remember me, how we used to be?" originally appeared in the song "Incarceration of a Flower Child", written by Waters in 1968. Neither Pink Floyd nor Waters recorded the song; however, it was recorded by Marianne Faithfull in 1999 for her fourteenth studio album Vagabond Ways.

== Critical reception ==
AllMusic critic Stewart Mason said of the song:

Only a handful of proper songs drift in between the linking tracks and underdeveloped themes, with the dramatic "Your Possible Pasts" among the best. Although the song's primary themes are retreads of the ideas behind The Wall ('By the cold and religious we were taken in hand/Shown how to feel good and told to feel bad' is nothing more than the Sunday school version of 'We don't need no education/We don't need no thought control'), Roger Waters uses a very soft/extremely loud dynamic effectively, in a manner quite similar to what Peter Gabriel was doing on his solo albums around the same time, and largely avoids the irritatingly schoolmarm-ish tone that his snickering vocals fall into on much of the rest of the album. However, the song has the same fundamental problem as the rest of The Final Cut: a lack of truly interesting melodic development—which was clearly what David Gilmour, who has no songwriting credits here or on the rest of the album, brought to the group.

Chris Ott of Pitchfork described the song as:

a titanic blend of stadium rock, psychedelia and pathos, concluding with devastating imagery", but concluded that "[t]he raucous chorus, 'Do you remember me?/ How we used to be/ Do you think we should be closer?', drifts over a somewhat predictable arrangement, certainly nothing new in the face of their defining mope-rock standard 'Comfortably Numb'.

== Personnel ==
Pink Floyd

- Roger Waters – bass guitar, acoustic guitar, tape effects, sound effects, and vocals
- David Gilmour – electric guitars
- Nick Mason – drums

with:

- Michael Kamen – electric piano and orchestrations
- Andy Bown – Hammond organ
- Ray Cooper – percussion
