= The Gunner's Dream =

1983 song by Pink Floyd

Song by Pink Floyd

from the album The Final Cut
- Released: 21 March 1983
- Recorded: July–December 1982
- Genre: Art rock; progressive rock; jazz fusion
- Length: 5:07
- Label: Harvest (UK); Columbia (US)
- Songwriter: Roger Waters
- Producers: Roger Waters; James Guthrie; Michael Kamen

Music video
- "The Gunner's Dream" on YouTube

"The Gunner's Dream" is a song from Pink Floyd's twelfth studio album The Final Cut (1983). This song was one of several to be considered for the band's "best of" album, Echoes: The Best of Pink Floyd (2001). The song tells the story and thoughts of an airman gunner as he falls to his death during a raid, dreaming of a safe world in the future, without war. It is one of the four songs on the video version of the album The Final Cut Video EP. In his lyrics, Waters references real-life events including the then very recent Hyde Park and Regent's Park bombings by the Provisional Irish Republican Army (IRA), and takes the refrain "some corner of a foreign field" from Rupert Brooke's poem The Soldier (1914).

== Critical reception ==
In a retrospective review for The Final Cut, Rachel Mann of The Quietus described "The Gunner's Dream" as the album's centerpiece; the track "tenderly imagines the lost hopes and expectations of a bomber gunner shot down and falling to his death over Berlin." Mann believed Waters' voice is "beautifully matched to words whose understatement adds to the power."

== Personnel ==
Pink Floyd

- Roger Waters – vocals, bass guitar, and tape effects
- David Gilmour – guitar
- Nick Mason – drums

with:

- The National Philharmonic Orchestra conducted and arranged by Michael Kamen
- Raphael Ravenscroft – tenor saxophone
- Michael Kamen – piano and electric piano
- Andy Bown – Steinway piano

== Use of the song in media ==
The song was re-recorded with Durga McBroom on vocals for inclusion in the soundtrack for G.B. Hajim's animated sci-fi musical Strange Frame (2012).

== See also ==
- List of anti-war songs
