= The Post War Dream (song) =

Song by Pink Floyd

from the album The Final Cut
- Released: 21 March 1983
- Recorded: July–December 1982
- Genre: Art rock
- Length: 3:01
- Label: Harvest (UK); Columbia (US)
- Songwriter: Roger Waters
- Producers: Roger Waters; James Guthrie; Michael Kamen

Official audio
- "The Post War Dream" on YouTube

"The Post War Dream" is the opening track on The Final Cut (1983), the twelfth studio album by the English rock band, Pink Floyd.

== Intro ==
The song's intro features a car radio being tuned in and out of different stations and can be seen on the short film for The Final Cut.

"...a group of business men announced plans to build a nuclear fallout shelter at Peterborough in Cambridgeshire..."
[radio tuning]
"...three High Court judges have cleared the way..."
[radio tuning]
"...It was announced today, that the replacement for the Atlantic Conveyor the container ship lost in the Falklands Conflict would be built in Japan, a spokesman for..."
[radio tuning]
"...moving in. They say the Third World countries, like Bolivia, which produce the drug are suffering from rising violence..."

== Composition ==
The song is three minutes long and consists of many sound effects, such as row boats and screaming, typical of the album. The music itself begins quietly with harmonium and Waters' hushed vocal, in addition to the sounds of certain orchestral instruments. This segues into a louder, more theatrical section dominated by electric guitars. During this particular section, Waters vocal is shouted, a definite contrast from his manner of singing during the previous part of the song.

The melody of the first part bears a strong resemblance to John Prine's 1971 song "Sam Stone", about a war veteran's tragic fate. Both songs share the same chord progression, instrumentation, and melody. They are even in the same key (F major).

== Personnel ==
Pink Floyd

- Roger Waters – vocals, bass guitar, tape effects
- David Gilmour – guitar
- Nick Mason – drums

with:

- Michael Kamen – harmonium
- National Philharmonic Orchestra – conducted and arranged by Michael Kamen
