= Paranoid Eyes =

Song by Pink Floyd

from the album The Final Cut
- Released: 21 March 1983
- Recorded: July–December 1982
- Genre: Soft rock
- Length: 3:41
- Label: Harvest (UK); Columbia (US)
- Songwriter: Roger Waters
- Producers: Roger Waters; James Guthrie; Michael Kamen

Official audio
- "Paranoid Eyes" on YouTube

"Paranoid Eyes" is a song from Pink Floyd's twelfth studio album The Final Cut (1983). This song was one of several to be considered for the band's "best of" album Echoes: The Best of Pink Floyd (2001).

== Personnel ==
Pink Floyd

- Roger Waters – vocals, bass guitar, acoustic guitar

with:

- Michael Kamen – piano and orchestrations
- Andy Bown – organ
- Ray Cooper – percussion
- National Philharmonic Orchestra – brass and string instruments
