= Not Now John =

Single by Pink Floyd

from the album The Final Cut
- B-side: "The Hero's Return"
- Released: April 1983
- Recorded: July–December 1982
- Genre: Hard rock
- Length: 5:02 (album version); 4:12 (single edit)
- Label: Harvest (UK); Columbia (US)
- Songwriter: Roger Waters
- Producers: Roger Waters; James Guthrie; Michael Kamen

Pink Floyd singles chronology
"When the Tigers Broke Free" (1982)	"Not Now John" (1983)	"Learning to Fly" / "Terminal Frost" (1987)

Music video
- "Not Now John" on YouTube

"Not Now John" is a song by the English rock band Pink Floyd, written by Roger Waters. It appears on their twelfth studio album The Final Cut (1983). The track is the only one on the album featuring the lead vocals of David Gilmour, found in the verses, with Roger Waters singing the refrains and interludes, and was the only single released from the album (discounting "When the Tigers Broke Free", a non-album single retroactively added to the album in 2004). It reached No. 30 on the UK singles chart.

== Music video ==
In The Final Cut video EP, the music video for the song depicts a Japanese boy walking through a factory searching for a soldier. The child is confronted by factory workers playing cards and geisha girls before he falls to his death from a scaffold and is discovered by a Second World War veteran (played by the Scottish actor Alex McAvoy, who also played the schoolteacher in 1982's Pink Floyd – The Wall). The video was directed by Waters' then brother-in-law, Willie Christie.

== Composition ==
"Not Now John" is the only track on the album to feature anyone other than Waters on lead vocals. Unlike the majority of tracks on The Final Cut (1983), "Not Now John" takes an upbeat, driving, tempo – and hard rock style – for much of its duration. Gilmour and Waters split vocal duties, similar to the song "Comfortably Numb" from The Wall (1979), and they represent different "characters" or points of view; Gilmour is the self-serving ignorant layperson while Waters is the intellectual, responsible observer of the world's woes. Waters' part reprises the melody, chord progression and some of the lyrics from "One of the Few".

The "John" of the title does not refer to any particular person named John. It is a British colloquial usage as a placeholder name, closely associated with blue-collar workers, where "John" can be employed informally in the same way as "mate", "pal", or "buddy" to address someone whose name is not known.

== Single ==
"Not Now John" was released as a single in April 1983. The words "fuck all that" were overdubbed as "stuff all that" by Gilmour, Waters, and the female backing singers, while the "Where's the bar?" lyric is sung in Italian, Greek and French, as the single fades out before the English iteration.

"The Hero's Return" was released as the B-side, featuring an additional verse not included on the album. A 12" single was released in the UK, featuring the two 7" tracks on side 1 and the album version of "Not Now John" on side 2. The single hit number 30 in the UK and number seven on the US Mainstream Rock Tracks chart.

1. "Not Now John" (single version) – 4:12
2. "The Hero's Return (Parts I and II)" – 4:02
3. "Not Now John" (album version) – 4:56 (12" single only)

== Critical reception ==
In a review for The Final Cut (1983) on release, Kurt Loder of Rolling Stone described "Not Now John" as "one of the most ferocious performances Pink Floyd has ever put on record." In a retrospective review of The Final Cut (1983), Rachel Mann of The Quietus described "Not Now John" as "fun, but musically crass and obvious," further saying "this is Surrey Blues rock as vapid as the views it seeks to satirize."

== Personnel ==
Pink Floyd

- Roger Waters – co-lead vocals, bass guitar, twelve-string guitar, tape effects, synthesizer
- David Gilmour – co-lead vocals, electric guitar
- Nick Mason – drums

Additional musicians

- Andy Bown – Hammond organ
- Doreen Chanter – backing vocals (call and response)
- Irene Chanter – backing vocals (call and response)
