= Two Suns in the Sunset =

Song by Pink Floyd

from the album The Final Cut
- Released: 21 March 1983
- Recorded: July–December 1982
- Genre: Folk rock
- Length: 5:23
- Label: Harvest (UK); Columbia (US)
- Songwriter: Roger Waters
- Producers: Roger Waters; James Guthrie; Michael Kamen

Official audio
- "Two Suns in the Sunset" on YouTube

"Two Suns in the Sunset" is the closing track on Pink Floyd's twelfth studio album The Final Cut (1983), and Roger Waters' final chronological contribution to the band, before leaving in 1985.

Since there was no promotional tour for The Final Cut, and this album was entirely ignored by Gilmour, Wright and Mason during the tours for A Momentary Lapse of Reason and The Division Bell, "Two Suns in the Sunset" was never performed live by Pink Floyd. However, Roger Waters, as a solo artist, premiered the song almost 35 years after its release in a concert from the Us + Them Tour, held on 17 October 2018 at Itaipava Arena Fonte Nova in Salvador, Bahia, Brazil. Waters also played it in 2022 on his 2022–23 tour This Is Not a Drill.

== Lyrics and music ==
Partway through the song, the lyric "the sun is in the east, even though the day is done" refers to the glowing fireball of a nuclear explosion. The song was partly inspired by Andrzej Wajda's 1958 film Ashes and Diamonds (Polish: Popiół i diament).

Session drummer Andy Newmark plays drums on this song, as Pink Floyd drummer Nick Mason felt unable to perform its complex time signature changes. The song begins and ends in 9/8 time, while the majority of the song is in 4/4 (or common time), and it is punctuated with added measures of 7/8 and 3/8. Adding to the complexity, the main theme of the rhythm guitar has chords changing emphatically in dotted eighth notes, so three eighth-note beats are divided equally in two. This is not unlike what "Mother", from Pink Floyd's previous studio album, The Wall (1979), does, and on that song, Mason relinquished the drumming duties, in that case to Jeff Porcaro.

== Critical reception ==
In a review for The Final Cut, Justin Gerber of Consequence described "Two Suns in the Sunset" as "the album's crowning achievement."

Toby Manning was less enthusiastic in his retrospective review, saying that this was the one song off The Final Cut where the musician Waters couldn't stay on the same level as the conceptualist Waters.

== Personnel ==
Pink Floyd

- Roger Waters – vocals, acoustic guitar, bass guitar, scream, sound effects
- David Gilmour – electric guitar

with:

- Andy Newmark – drums
- Andy Bown – Hammond organ
- Raphael Ravenscroft – saxophone
- Michael Kamen – piano

== See also ==
- List of anti-war songs
