= One of the Few =

Song by Pink Floyd

from the album The Final Cut
- Released: 21 March 1983
- Recorded: July–December 1982
- Genre: Art rock
- Length: 1:12
- Label: Harvest (UK); Columbia (US)
- Songwriter: Roger Waters
- Producers: Roger Waters; James Guthrie; Michael Kamen

Official audio
- "One of the Few" on YouTube

"One of the Few" is a song by the English progressive rock band Pink Floyd. It was released as the third track on their twelfth studio album The Final Cut (1983). The song is 1 minute and 12 seconds long. It features a ticking clock in the background and a steady drumbeat. The melody features most of the D minor scale. The lyrics describe a war veteran's return from the battlefield (specifically a pilot from the Battle of Britain, commonly known as "The Few") to pursue teaching. The ticking clock continues to the next track, "The Hero's Return", which is sung from the veteran's perspective. This is one of the rejected songs from The Wall (1979), and its working title was "Teach".

The lyrics "Make 'em laugh, Make 'em cry" in the third and final verse of the song is reprised in the third verse of "Not Now John" which is the eleventh track on The Final Cut.

The title, "One of the Few", is a reference to Winston Churchill's speech before the House of Commons on 20 August 1940 in which he stated "Never was so much owed by so many to so few" in reference to the Royal Air Force's defence of Great Britain.

The song was also covered by the English rock band Anathema on their fourth studio album Alternative 4 (1998).

== Critical reception ==
In a retrospective review for The Final Cut, Rachel Mann of The Quietus described "One of the Few" as "plaintive and consciously echoes Wilfred Owen's poem The Send Off, with its talk of siding sheds and the trains ready to take young men to their deaths."

== Personnel ==
Pink Floyd

- Roger Waters – vocals, acoustic guitar, synthesizer, bass guitar
