= Southampton Dock =

Song by Pink Floyd

from the album The Final Cut
- Released: 21 March 1983
- Recorded: July–December 1982
- Genre: Folk rock; art rock
- Length: 2:10
- Label: Harvest (UK); Columbia (US)
- Songwriter: Roger Waters
- Producers: Roger Waters; James Guthrie; Michael Kamen

Official audio
- "Southampton Dock" on YouTube

"Southampton Dock" is a song from Pink Floyd's twelfth studio album, The Final Cut (1983). During the Second World War, many soldiers departed from Southampton to fight against the Germans. In the early 1980s, Southampton was again used as a departure base, this time for the Falklands War. The song describes a woman who "bravely waves" the soldiers "Goodbye again".

The song includes a snippet of the theme from the track "It's Never Too Late", a song originally written and recorded for The Wall (1979) but was cut before the final band production demo of 12 August 1979. "It's Never Too Late" was later reworked and the melody was incorporated into the second section of "Southampton Dock".

Roger Waters repeatedly performed the song on his solo tours; a live recording (prefaced by "Get Your Filthy Hands Off My Desert", another song from The Final Cut) appears on his album In the Flesh – Live (2000).

== Critical reception ==
In a review for The Final Cut, Patrick Schabe of PopMatters described "Southampton Dock" as an example of where the album works best, and described the song's imagery as "subtle, poetic, and effective."

== Personnel ==
Pink Floyd

- Roger Waters – vocals, acoustic guitar, bass guitar

with:

- Michael Kamen – piano and orchestrations
