= Zabriskie Point (album) =

Soundtrack album by various artists
- Released: April 11, 1970 (US), May 29, 1970 (UK)
- Genre: Rock
- Length: 36:22
- Labels: MGM (original issue); Rhino (early reissues); Sony Classical/WaterTower Music (current reissues)

Pink Floyd soundtracks chronology
More (1969)	Zabriskie Point (1970)	Obscured by Clouds (1972)

Professional ratings
Review scores
Source	Rating
AllMusic	4/5 stars
Christgau's Record Guide	B−
Uncut	3/5 stars

Zabriskie Point is a soundtrack album to the Michelangelo Antonioni film of the same name. It was originally released April 11, 1970 in the US and May 29, 1970 in the UK and features songs recorded by contemporary rock acts of Antonioni's choosing, including Pink Floyd, the Grateful Dead, and the Kaleidoscope.

A 1997 re-release includes four bonus tracks each from Jerry Garcia and Pink Floyd that were used in the film, but not the original soundtrack. Jim Morrison of The Doors wrote the track "L'America" for the film, but was rejected by Antonioni ("L'America" was later released on The Doors' album L.A. Woman). A Rolling Stones track, "You Got the Silver", along with Roy Orbison's ending credits song "So Young", are featured in the film but not included on the album.

== Pink Floyd ==
Pink Floyd's contributions to the album were recorded in November and December 1969, after the release of Ummagumma. "Come In Number 51, Your Time Is Up" is a re-recording of "Careful with That Axe, Eugene", originally released as a B-side in December 1968. "Love Scene (Version 4)" is a Rick Wright solo piano composition. "Country Song" (also known as "The Red Queen") is a ballad filled with chess metaphors. "Unknown Song" (also known as "Rain in the Country") is a relaxed instrumental. "Love Scene (Version 6)" (also known as "Alan's Blues") is a bluesy instrumental. A track entitled "Fingal's Cave" and another called "Oenone" were recorded but did not appear on the finished album.

Pink Floyd also recorded other unreleased material during the same sessions. Most notable is a lengthy composition which at that time was known as "The Violent Sequence" (later released on Dark Side of the Moon Immersion Box Set). This was later reworked, as "Us and Them" from The Dark Side of the Moon. An additional number of tracks of previously unreleased studio work from these sessions have been released in 2016 on The Early Years 1965–1972 (Volume 4: 1970: Devi/ation).

== Critical reception ==
Village Voice critic Robert Christgau has said the soundtrack album is "considerably deeper and more coherent" than the film. AllMusic's Steven McDonald later called it "an odd melange of songs" but also "well worth hearing" for the Pink Floyd recordings.

== Track listing ==
No.	Title	Writer(s)	Artist	Length
1.	"Heart Beat, Pig Meat"	David Gilmour/Roger Waters/Richard Wright/Nick Mason	Pink Floyd	3:12
2.	"Brother Mary"	David Lindley	Kaleidoscope	2:42
3.	"Excerpt from Dark Star"	Jerry Garcia/Mickey Hart/Robert Hunter/Bill Kreutzmann/Phil Lesh/Ron "Pigpen" McKernan/Bob Weir	Grateful Dead	2:32
4.	"Crumbling Land"	Gilmour/Waters/Wright/Mason	Pink Floyd	4:16
5.	"Tennessee Waltz"	Pee Wee King/Redd Stewart	Patti Page	3:03
6.	"Sugar Babe"	Jesse Colin Young	The Youngbloods	2:13
7.	"Love Scene"	Garcia	Jerry Garcia (Grateful Dead)	7:02
8.	"I Wish I Was a Single Girl Again"	Roscoe Holcomb	Roscoe Holcomb	1:56
9.	"Mickey's Tune"	Lindley	Kaleidoscope	1:42
10.	"Dance of Death"	John Fahey	John Fahey	2:43
11.	"Come In Number 51, Your Time Is Up"	Gilmour/Waters/Wright/Mason	Pink Floyd	5:01
Total length:				36:22

Bonus disc from 1997 release
No.	Title	Artist	Length
1.	"Love Scene Improvisations (Version 1)" (Garcia)	Jerry Garcia	6:18
2.	"Love Scene Improvisations (Version 2)" (Garcia)	Jerry Garcia	8:00
3.	"Love Scene Improvisations (Version 3)" (Garcia)	Jerry Garcia	7:52
4.	"Love Scene Improvisations (Version 4)" (Garcia)	Jerry Garcia	8:04
5.	"Country Song" (Gilmour/Waters/Wright/Mason)	Pink Floyd	4:37
6.	"Unknown Song" (Gilmour/Waters/Wright/Mason)	Pink Floyd	6:01
7.	"Love Scene (Version 6)" (Gilmour/Waters/Wright/Mason)	Pink Floyd	7:26
8.	"Love Scene (Version 4)" (Wright)	Pink Floyd	6:45
Total length:			55:03
