= Country Song (Pink Floyd song) =

Song by Pink Floyd

from the album Zabriskie Point
- Released: 1997
- Recorded: 1969
- Genre: Country rock
- Length: 4:37
- Label: MCA
- Songwriters: David Gilmour; Rick Wright; Nick Mason; Roger Waters

"Country Song", also known as "The Red Queen Theme", is an untitled country-styled song by Pink Floyd.

== History ==
David Gilmour provides the lead vocals (though the remastered Zabriskie Point soundtrack booklet incorrectly states that Roger Waters is providing the lead vocal, though he does share vocals in unison with Gilmour in the chorus sections).
