= The Hero's Return =

- "The Hero's Return (Parts 1 and 2)" on vinyl

Song by Pink Floyd

from the album The Final Cut
- Released: 21 March 1983
- Recorded: July–December 1982
- Genre: Art rock
- Length: 2:56; 4:02 (Parts 1 and 2; "Not Now John" single B-side)
- Label: Harvest (UK); Columbia (US)
- Songwriter: Roger Waters
- Producers: Roger Waters; James Guthrie; Michael Kamen

Official Audio
- "The Hero's Return" on YouTube

"The Hero's Return" is a song by the English rock band Pink Floyd from their twelfth studio album, The Final Cut (1983).

Like many tracks included on The Final Cut, "The Hero's Return" had – under its original title "Teacher, Teacher" – been previously rejected from their eleventh studio album The Wall (1979). Guitarist David Gilmour was opposed to this recycling of songs, believing that if they "weren't good enough for The Wall, why are they good enough now?"

Like many other tracks on The Final Cut, "The Hero's Return" featured anti-war lyrics. The lyrics of "The Hero's Return" are almost entirely rewritten from its "Teacher, Teacher" demo version.

The song reveals the sadistic teacher of The Wall has been a Royal Air Force bomber pilot in the World War Two, participated in the Bombing of Dresden, and having his tail gunner shot to death, presumably by night fighters or anti-aircraft gunnery. This has left him with severe post-traumatic stress disorder, and neither his wife nor his pupils can comprehend what he has been through.

Retitled as "The Hero's Return (Parts 1 and 2)" with an extra verse absent from The Final Cut version, the song was released as the B-side of "Not Now John", also from The Final Cut, in April 1983. Despite not being released as an A-side to a single, "The Hero's Return" charted at No. 31 on the US Billboard Mainstream Rock chart.

== Credits ==
Pink Floyd

- Roger Waters – lead vocals, bass guitar, synthesiser, tape effects, acoustic guitar
- David Gilmour – lead and rhythm guitar
- Nick Mason – drums, percussion

Additional musician

- Andy Bown – Yamaha electric piano
