= The Final Cut (album) =

Studio album by Pink Floyd
- Released: 21 March 1983
- Recorded: July–December 1982
- Studios: Mayfair, RAK, Olympic, Abbey Road, Eel Pie, Audio International, and the Billiard Room in London; Hook End Recording Studios in Oxfordshire, England
- Genre: Art rock
- Length: 43:14; 46:30 (2004 remaster)
- Labels: Harvest; Columbia
- Producers: Roger Waters; James Guthrie; Michael Kamen

Pink Floyd chronology
A Collection of Great Dance Songs (1981)	The Final Cut (1983)	Works (1983)

Singles from The Final Cut
- 1. "Not Now John" Released: April 1983

The Final Cut is the twelfth studio album by the English rock band Pink Floyd, released on 21 March 1983 through Harvest and Columbia Records. It includes unused material from the band's previous studio album, The Wall (1979), and new material recorded throughout 1982.

The Final Cut is the last Pink Floyd album to feature founding member Roger Waters, who left the band in 1985. It is the only Pink Floyd album without founding member and keyboardist Richard Wright, who had left the band under pressure from Waters after the Wall sessions. The recording was plagued by conflict; guitarist David Gilmour felt many of the tracks were not worthy of inclusion, but Waters accused him of failing to contribute material himself.

Waters planned the album as a soundtrack for The Wall's 1982 film adaptation. With the onset of the Falklands War, he rewrote it as a concept album exploring what he considered the betrayal of those—including his father—who died defending freedom in the Second World War. Waters sang lead vocals on all but one track, and he is credited for all songwriting. The album was accompanied by a short film released in the same year.

The Final Cut received mixed reviews. Though it reached number one in the UK and number six in the US, it was the lowest-selling Pink Floyd studio album worldwide since their sixth album, Meddle (1971).

== Background ==
The Final Cut was conceived as a soundtrack album for Pink Floyd – The Wall, the 1982 film based on Pink Floyd's previous studio album The Wall (1979). Under its working title Spare Bricks, it would have featured new music rerecorded for the film, such as "When the Tigers Broke Free". Primary songwriter Roger Waters also planned to record a small amount of new material, expanding The Wall's narrative.

As a result of the Falklands War, Waters changed direction and wrote new material. He saw British Prime Minister Margaret Thatcher's response to Argentina's invasion of the islands as jingoistic and unnecessary, and dedicated the new album—provisionally titled Requiem for a Post-War Dream—to his father, Eric Fletcher Waters. A second lieutenant of the 8th Royal Fusiliers, Eric Waters died during the Second World War at Aprilia in Italy, on 18 February 1944, when Roger was five months old. Waters said:

The Final Cut was about how, with the introduction of the Welfare State, we felt we were moving forward into something resembling a liberal country where we would all look after one another ... but I'd seen all that chiselled away, and I'd seen a return to an almost Dickensian society under Margaret Thatcher. I felt then, as now, that the British government should have pursued diplomatic avenues, rather than steaming in the moment that task force arrived in the South Atlantic.

Waters had conflicting feelings about how his generation was tackling issues that greatly affected his father's generation. In an interview in 1987, he confessed:

It says something about a sense, I suppose for me personally, a sense that I may have betrayed him. He died in the last war and I kind of feel that I personally may have betrayed him, because we haven't managed to improve things very much. That the economic cycles still over-ride everything, with the best intentions, the cycle of economic recession followed by resurgence still governs our actions.

Guitarist David Gilmour disliked Waters' politicising, and the new creative direction prompted arguments. Five other tracks not used on The Wall ("Your Possible Pasts", "One of the Few", "The Final Cut", "The Fletcher Memorial Home", and "The Hero's Return") had been set aside for Spare Bricks, and although Pink Floyd had often reused material, Gilmour felt the songs were not good enough for a new studio album. He wanted to write new material, but Waters remained doubtful as Gilmour had lately contributed little new music. Gilmour said:

I'm certainly guilty at times of being lazy, and moments have arrived when Roger might say, "Well, what have you got?" And I'd be like, "Well, I haven't got anything right now. I need a bit of time to put some ideas on tape." There are elements of all this stuff that, years later, you can look back on and say, "Well, he had a point there." But he wasn't right about wanting to put some duff tracks on The Final Cut. I said to Roger, "If these songs weren't good enough for The Wall, why are they good enough now?"

The title The Final Cut is a reference to William Shakespeare's play Julius Caesar (1599): "This was the most unkindest cut of all". "When the Tigers Broke Free" was issued as a single titled "Pink Floyd: The Wall: Music from the Film" on 26 July 1982, with the film version of "Bring the Boys Back Home" on the B-side; (Note: UK EMI Harvest HAR 5222 seven inch single), US Columbia AS 1541 (promotional twelve inch single, US Columbia X18-03142 (seven inch single)) (Note: The label on both sides of the single listed the tracks as taken from the forthcoming Final Cut album; however, neither song was included.) the single was labelled "Taken from the album The Final Cut" but was not included on that album until the 2004 CD reissue.

== Concept ==
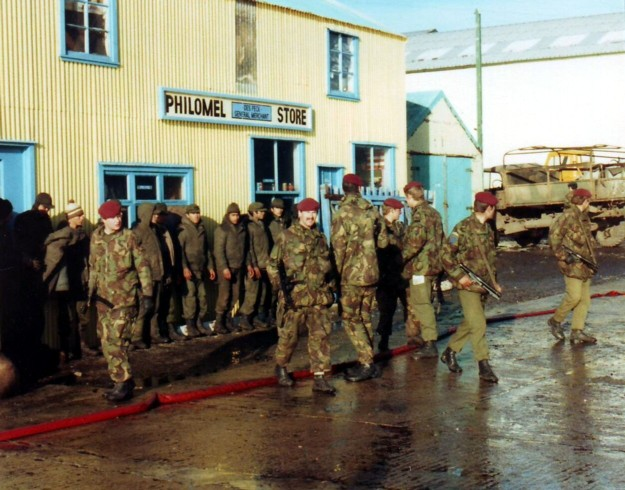
British paratroopers guard Argentine prisoners of war on the Falkland Islands. Waters' frustration at the events surrounding the Falklands War is evident in the album.

The Final Cut is an anti-war concept album that explores what Waters regards as the betrayal of fallen British servicemen—such as his father—who during the Second World War sacrificed their lives in the spirit of a post-war dream. This dream was that their victory would usher in a more peaceful world, whose leaders would no longer be so eager to resolve disputes by resorting to war. The lyrics are critical of Thatcher, whose policies and decisions Waters regarded as an example of this betrayal. She is referred to as "Maggie" throughout most of the album, and on "The Fletcher Memorial Home" as "Mrs. Thatcher".

The opening track, "The Post War Dream", begins with a recorded announcement that the replacement for the Atlantic Conveyor, a ship lost during the Falklands campaign, will be built in Japan. Waters' lyrics refer to his dead father, the loss of Britain's shipbuilding industry to Japan, and Margaret Thatcher, before moving on to "Your Possible Pasts", a rewritten version of a song rejected for The Wall. In "One of the Few", another rejected song, the schoolteacher from The Wall features as the main character of the Final Cut short film, presented as a war hero returned to civilian life. He is unable to relate his experiences to his wife, and in "The Hero's Return" is tormented by the loss of one of his aircrew. "The Gunner's Dream" discusses the hope of a world free from tyranny and the threat of terrorism (with a reference to the Hyde Park bombing). It is followed in "Paranoid Eyes" by the teacher's descent into alcoholism.

The second half deals with various war issues. While "Southampton Dock" is a lament to returning war heroes and those who did not return, "Not Now John" addresses society's ignorance of political and economic problems. "Get Your Filthy Hands Off My Desert" deals with Waters' feelings about war and invasion, and "The Fletcher Memorial Home" (the title is a nod to Waters' father) reflects a fantastical application of "the Final Solution" on a gathering of political leaders including Soviet Leonid Brezhnev (who died before the album was released), Israeli Menachem Begin and Thatcher. "The Final Cut" deals with the aftermath of a man's social isolation and sexual repression, as he contemplates suicide and struggles to reconnect with the world around him. The album ends with "Two Suns in the Sunset", which portrays a nuclear holocaust: the final result of a world obsessed with war and control.

== Recording ==
"The Post War Dream"
Waters' lyrics demonstrate his despair of war, in particular the Falklands War.

American composer, arranger, conductor, and musician Michael Kamen, who had contributed to The Wall, co-produced, oversaw the orchestral arrangements, and mediated between Waters and Gilmour. Along with Andy Bown, Kamen also stood in for keyboardist Richard Wright, who had left the band under pressure from Waters during the recording of The Wall. James Guthrie was the audio engineer and co-producer, while Mason's drumming was supplemented by Ray Cooper on percussion; when Mason was unable to perform the complex time changes on "Two Suns in the Sunset", he was replaced by session musician Andy Newmark. Mason also suggested the repeated reprises of "Maggie, what have we done" be rendered instrumental rather than sung. Raphael Ravenscroft was hired to play the saxophone, which was used in place of guitar solos on two tracks. Recording took place in the latter half of 1982 across eight studios, including Gilmour's home studio at Hook End Manor in Oxfordshire, and Waters' Billiard Room Studios in East Sheen. The other studios were Mayfair Studios, Olympic Studios, Abbey Road Studios, Eel Pie Studios, Audio International and RAK Studios.

Tensions soon emerged, and while Waters and Gilmour initially worked together, playing the video game Donkey Kong (1981) in their spare time, they eventually chose to work separately. Audio engineer Andy Jackson worked with Waters on vocals; Guthrie with Gilmour on guitars. They would occasionally meet to discuss the work that had been completed; while this method was not in itself unusual, Gilmour began to feel strained, sometimes barely maintaining his composure. Kamen too felt pressured; Waters had never been a confident vocalist and, on one occasion, after repeated studio takes, Waters noticed him writing on a notepad. Losing his temper, he demanded to know what Kamen was doing, only to find that Kamen had been writing, "I Must Not Fuck Sheep" repeatedly. Waters said that "a lot of that aggravation came through in the vocal performance, which, looking back, really was quite tortured."

Like previous Pink Floyd albums, The Final Cut used sound effects combined with advances in audio recording technology. Mason's contributions were mostly limited to recording sound effects for the experimental Holophonic system, an audio processing technique used to add an enhanced three-dimensional effect to the recordings; The Final Cut is the second album ever to feature this technology. The technique is featured on "Get Your Filthy Hands Off My Desert", creating a sound of a rocket flying by and exploding which surrounds the listener, especially when headphones are used. Sound effects are reused from the Pink Floyd albums Meddle (1971), The Dark Side of the Moon (1973), Wish You Were Here (1975), Animals (1977) and The Wall (1979).

After months of poor relations, and following a final confrontation, Gilmour had his name removed from the credit list as producer, although he was still paid production royalties. Waters later said that he was also under significant pressure and that early in production believed he would never record with Gilmour or Mason again. He may have threatened to release the album as a solo record, although Pink Floyd were contracted to EMI and such a move would have been unlikely to succeed. Mason kept himself distant, dealing with marital problems. In an August 1987 interview, Waters recalled The Final Cut as an "absolute misery to make", and that the band members were "fighting like cats and dogs". He said the experience forced them to accept that they had not worked together as a band since their ninth studio album Wish You Were Here (1975).

== Packaging ==
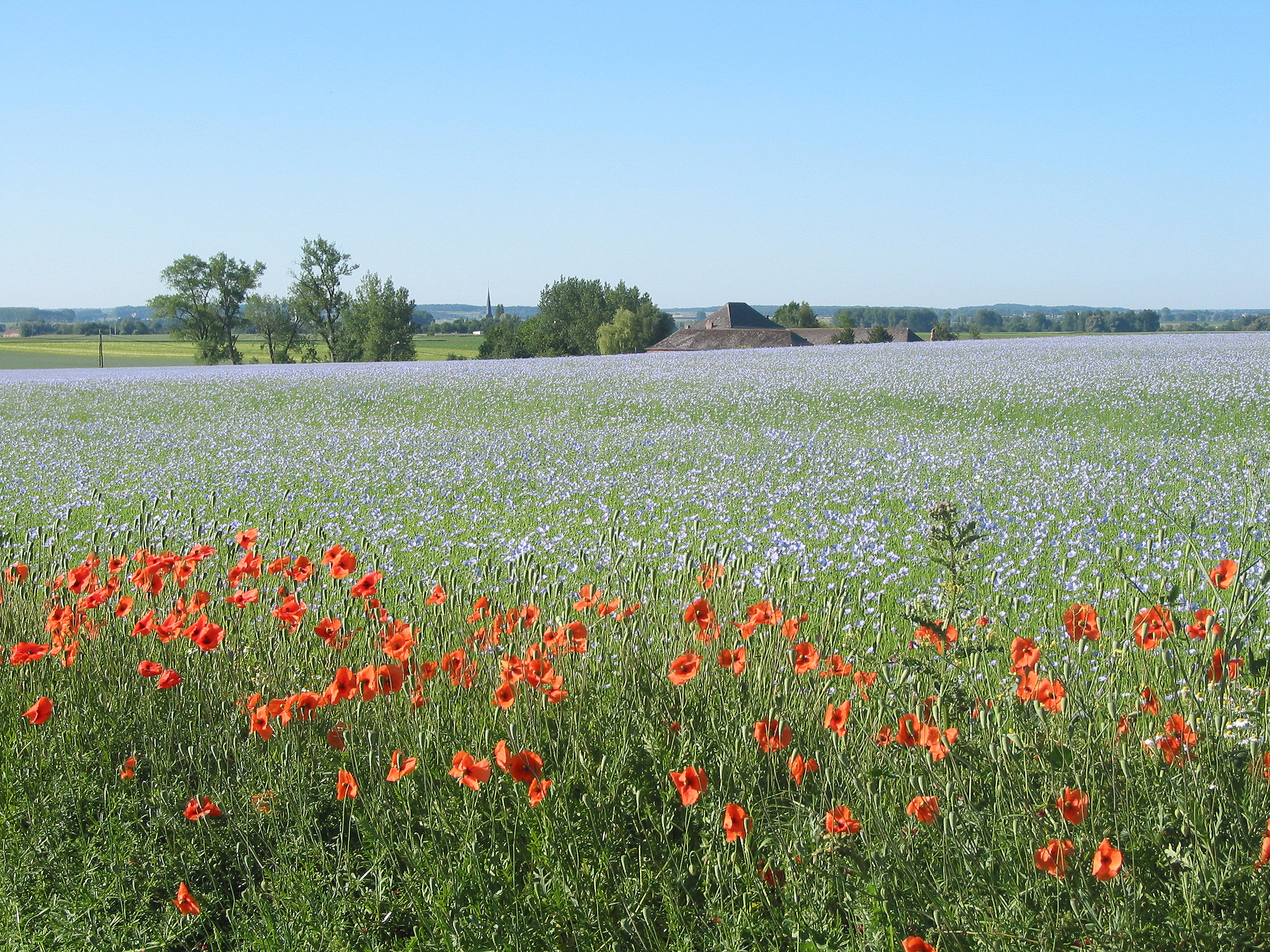
Poppies are a recurring theme in the artwork.

Art director Storm Thorgerson, a founder member of Hipgnosis (designers of most of Pink Floyd's previous and future artwork), was passed over for the cover design. Instead, Waters created the cover himself, using photographs taken by his then brother-in-law, Willie Christie. The front cover shows a remembrance poppy and four Second World War medal ribbons against the black fabric of the jacket or blazer on which they are worn. From left to right, the medals are the 1939–1945 Star, the Africa Star, the Defence Medal, and the Distinguished Flying Cross.

The poppy is a recurring design theme. The interior gatefold features three photographs, the first depicting an outdoor scene with an outstretched hand holding three poppies and in the distance, a soldier with his back to the camera. Two more photographs show a welder at work, his mask emblazoned with the Japanese Rising Sun Flag, and a nuclear explosion (a clear reference to "Two Suns in the Sunset"). The lyrics are printed on the gatefold. Side one of the vinyl disc carries an image of a poppy field, and on side two, a soldier with a knife in his back lies face down amongst the poppies, a dog beside him.

The back cover features a photograph of an officer standing upright and holding a film canister, with a knife protruding from his back: the film canister and knife may reflect Waters' tumultuous relationship with The Wall film director Alan Parker.

== Film ==
The Final Cut was accompanied by a short film. (Note: UK: Video Music Collection PM0010 (VHS PAL Video EP)) It features the songs "The Gunner's Dream", "The Final Cut", "The Fletcher Memorial Home" and "Not Now John". Produced and written by Waters and directed by his then brother-in-law Willie Christie, it features Waters talking to a psychiatrist named A. Parker-Marshall. The character name was meant to be a dig at both Pink Floyd: The Wall director Alan Parker and producer Alan Marshall. Alex McAvoy, who had played the teacher from Pink Floyd – The Wall, returned in the role of the father of the film's protagonist. The film was released on Betamax and VHS in July 1983 and was one of EMI's first "video EPs".

== Release and sales ==
The Final Cut was released in the UK on 21 March 1983. It reached number one on the UK Albums Chart, surpassing The Dark Side of the Moon and The Wall. It was less successful in the United States, peaking at number six on the Billboard 200. Issued as a single, "Not Now John" reached the UK Top 30, with its chorus of "Fuck all that" bowdlerised to "Stuff all that".

With over 1,000,000 units shipped in the United States, the Recording Industry Association of America (RIAA) certified The Final Cut Platinum in May 1983. It was given double Platinum certification in 1997. However, The Final Cut was the lowest-selling Pink Floyd studio album in the United States and worldwide since Meddle. Gilmour claimed that this relative commercial failure supported his assertion that much of the material was weak. Waters responded that it was "ridiculous" to judge a record by its sales, and that he had been approached by a woman in a shop whose father had also been killed in the Second World War who told him The Final Cut was "the most moving record she had ever heard". In 1983, Gilmour said The Final Cut was "very good but it's not personally how I would see a Pink Floyd record going".

The Final Cut was released on CD in 1983. A remastered and repackaged CD was issued by EMI in Europe and on Capitol Records in the US in 2004; this included an extra song, the previously released "When the Tigers Broke Free". (Note: Harvest 7243 576734 2 6 (EMI) [eu] / EAN 0724357673426, UK EMI Harvest 576 7342) In 2007, a remastered version was released as part of the Oh, by the Way box set, packaged in a miniature replica of the original gatefold LP sleeve.

== Critical reception ==
Professional ratings
Review scores
Source	Rating
AllMusic	3/5 stars
The Daily Telegraph	2/5 stars
Drowned in Sound	4/10
The Encyclopedia of Popular Music	2/5 stars
MusicHound Rock	2.5/5 stars
Paste	7.8/10
Pitchfork	9.0/10
Rolling Stone	5/5 stars
The Rolling Stone Album Guide	2/5 stars
The Village Voice	C+

The Final Cut received mixed reviews. Melody Maker deemed it "a milestone in the history of awfulness", and the NME's Richard Cook wrote: "Like the poor damned Tommies that haunt his mind, Roger Waters' writing has been blown to hell ... Waters stopped with The Wall, and The Final Cut isolates and juggles the identical themes of that elephantine concept with no fresh momentum to drive them." Robert Christgau wrote in The Village Voice: "It's a comfort to encounter antiwar rock that has the weight of years of self-pity behind it", and awarded the album a "C+" grade.

More impressed, Rolling Stone's Kurt Loder viewed it as "essentially a Roger Waters solo album ... a superlative achievement on several levels". Dan Hedges of Record also approved, writing: "On paper it sounds hackneyed and contrived – the sort of thing that was worked into the ground by everyone from P. F. Sloan to Paul Kantner. In Pink Floyd's case, it still works, partially through the understatement and ingenuity of the music and the special effects ... but mostly through the care Waters has taken in plotting out the imagery of his bleak visions."

== Aftermath and legacy ==
With no plans to tour in support of the album, Waters and Gilmour turned to solo projects. Gilmour recorded and toured his second solo studio album About Face in 1984, using it to express his feelings on a range of topics from the murder of John Lennon to his relationship with Waters, who also released and began to tour in support of his debut solo studio album, The Pros and Cons of Hitch Hiking, the same year. Mason released his second solo studio album, Profiles, in August 1985.

In 1985, faced with a potentially ruinous lawsuit from his record company and band members, Waters resigned. He believed that Pink Floyd was a "spent force". He applied to the High Court to prevent the Pink Floyd name from ever being used again. His lawyers discovered that the partnership had never been formally confirmed, and Waters returned to the High Court in an attempt to gain a veto over further use of the band's name. Gilmour's team responded by issuing a press release affirming that Pink Floyd would continue; he told a Sunday Times reporter that "Roger is a dog in the manger and I'm going to fight him".

Waters wrote to EMI and Columbia declaring his intention to leave the group, asking them to release him from his contractual obligations. With a legal case pending, he dispensed with manager Steve O'Rourke and employed Peter Rudge to manage his affairs. He later contributed to the soundtrack for the adult animated disaster film When the Wind Blows (1986) and recorded a second solo studio album, Radio K.A.O.S. (1987)

Owing to the combination of Pink Floyd's partial break-up and Waters' dominance on the project, The Final Cut is sometimes viewed as a de facto Waters solo album. The personal quality of the lyrics are related to Waters' struggle to reconcile his despair at the changing social face of Britain, and also the loss of his father during the Second World War. Gilmour's guitar solos on "Your Possible Pasts" and "The Fletcher Memorial Home" are, however, sometimes considered the equal of his best work on The Wall. More recent reviews have weighed the album's importance alongside the band's break-up. Writing for AllMusic, Stephen Thomas Erlewine said "with its anger, emphasis on lyrics, and sonic textures, it's clear that it's the album that Waters intended it to be. And it's equally clear that Pink Floyd couldn't have continued in this direction." Stylus Magazine wrote: "It's about pursuing something greater even when you have all the money that you could ever want. And either failing or succeeding brilliantly. It's up to you to decide whether this record is a success or a failure, but I'd go with the former every time." Rachel Mann of The Quietus said "flawed though it is, The Final Cut remains a tremendous album" and "still has something fresh to say". Mike Diver of Drowned in Sound was less generous: "Rays of light are few and far between, and even on paper the track titles – including 'The Gunner's Dream' and 'Paranoid Eyes' – suggest an arduous listen."

== Track listing ==
All tracks are written by Roger Waters.

Original 1983 release Side one
No.	Title	Length
1.	"The Post War Dream"	3:00
2.	"Your Possible Pasts"	4:26
3.	"One of the Few"	1:11
4.	"The Hero's Return"	2:43
5.	"The Gunner's Dream"	5:18
6.	"Paranoid Eyes"	3:41

Side two
No.	Title	Length
7.	"Get Your Filthy Hands Off My Desert"	1:17
8.	"The Fletcher Memorial Home"	4:12
9.	"Southampton Dock"	2:14
10.	"The Final Cut"	4:43
11.	"Not Now John"	5:02
12.	"Two Suns in the Sunset"	5:14
Total length:		43:14

Notes

- All releases of the album from 2004 onwards have "When the Tigers Broke Free" added between "One of the Few" and "The Hero's Return".

== Personnel ==
- Numbers noted in parentheses below are based on the original track listing and CD track numbering, which does not include "When the Tigers Broke Free", included as the fourth track of the album from 2004's releases onwards.

Pink Floyd

- Roger Waters – lead vocals (all tracks), bass guitar (all tracks except 7), acoustic guitar (2–4, 6, 7, 9–12), synthesisers (3, 4, 10, 11), twelve-string guitar (11), tape effects, production, sleeve design
- David Gilmour – lead and rhythm guitars (1, 2, 4, 5, 8, 10–12), co-lead vocals (11), additional backing vocals (10)
- Nick Mason – drums (1, 2, 4, 5, 8, 10–11), percussion, tambourine (10)

Additional musicians

- Michael Kamen – piano (5, 6, 8–10, 12), electric piano (2, 5), harmonium (1, 10), production
- Andy Bown – Hammond organ (2, 6, 11, 12), piano (5), electric piano (4)
- Ray Cooper – percussion (2, 6)
- Andy Newmark – drums (12)
- Raphael Ravenscroft – tenor saxophone (5, 12)
- Doreen Chanter – backing vocals (11)
- Irene Chanter – backing vocals (11)
- National Philharmonic Orchestra, conducted and arranged by Michael Kamen (1, 5–10)

Production

- James Guthrie – production, engineering
- Andy Jackson – engineering
- Andy Canelle – assistant engineer
- Mike Nocito – assistant engineer
- Jules Bowen – assistant engineer
- Willie Christie – photography
- Artful Dodgers – sleeve design
- Zuccarelli Labs ltd – holophonics
- Doug Sax – mastering
- James Guthrie, Joel Plante – 2004 and 2011 remastering at das boot recording

== Charts ==
=== Weekly charts ===
1983 weekly chart performance for The Final Cut
Chart (1983)	Peak position
Australian Albums (Kent Music Report)	3
Austrian Albums (Ö3 Austria)	3
Canada Top Albums/CDs (RPM)	2
Finnish Albums (Suomen Virallinen)	3
French Albums (SNEP)	1
Italian Albums (Musica e Dischi)	1
Dutch Albums (Album Top 100)	2
German Albums (Offizielle Top 100)	1
New Zealand Albums (RMNZ)	1
Norwegian Albums (VG-lista)	1
Spanish Albums (AFYVE)	2
Swedish Albums (Sverigetopplistan)	1
UK Albums (Official Charts)	1
US Billboard 200	6

2017 weekly chart performance for The Final Cut
Chart (2017)	Peak position
Italian Albums (FIMI)	23
Polish Albums (ZPAV)	41
Swiss Albums (Schweizer Hitparade)	82

=== Year-end charts ===
1983 year-end chart performance for The Final Cut
Chart (1983)	Position
Austrian Albums (Ö3 Austria)	15
Canadian Albums (RPM Top 100)	18
Dutch Albums (Album Top 100)	20
German Albums (Offizielle Top 100)	14
New Zealand Albums (RMNZ)	15

== Certifications and sales ==
Certifications and sales for The Final Cut
Region	Certification	Certified units/sales
Australia (ARIA)	Platinum	50,000^{^}
Austria (IFPI Austria)	Gold	25,000^{*}
Brazil	—	100,000
France (SNEP)	Gold	100,000^{*}
Germany (BVMI)	Gold	250,000^{^}
Italy (FIMI) sales since 2009	Gold	25,000^{*}
Netherlands (NVPI)	Gold	50,000^{^}
New Zealand (RMNZ)	Platinum	15,000^{^}
Spain (Promusicae)	Gold	50,000^{^}
United Kingdom (BPI)	Gold	100,000^{^}
United States (RIAA)	2× Platinum	2,000,000^{^}
Yugoslavia	—	49,652
Summaries
Worldwide	—	3,000,000
^{*} Sales figures based on certification alone.^{^} Shipments figures based on certification alone.
