= High Hopes (Pink Floyd song) =

Single by Pink Floyd

from the album The Division Bell
- A-side: "Keep Talking" (double A-side, UK)
- B-side: "One of These Days (Live)" (UK); "Marooned" (France)
- Released: 10 October 1994
- Recorded: January – December 1993
- Studio: Astoria, London
- Genre: Progressive rock; new-age
- Length: 8:31 (album version); 5:16 (radio edit); 7:01 (Echoes version)
- Label: EMI; Columbia
- Composer: David Gilmour
- Lyricists: Polly Samson; David Gilmour
- Producers: Bob Ezrin; David Gilmour

Pink Floyd singles chronology
"Take It Back" (1994)	"High Hopes" / "Keep Talking" (1994)	"Wish You Were Here (Live)" (1995)

Music video
- "High Hopes" on YouTube

"High Hopes" is a song by English rock band Pink Floyd, composed by guitarist David Gilmour with lyrics by Gilmour and Polly Samson. It is the closing track on their fourteenth studio album, The Division Bell (1994); it was released as the second single from the album on 10 October 1994. An accompanying music video was made for the song and was directed by Storm Thorgerson.

Douglas Adams, a friend of Gilmour, chose the title for The Division Bell from one verse in this song. Live versions are featured on Pink Floyd's Pulse, as well as Gilmour's In Concert, Remember That Night, Live in Gdańsk and Live at Pompeii releases. On Echoes: The Best of Pink Floyd, a somewhat shortened version of the song segues into Syd Barrett's "Bike". The segue is accomplished by cutting from the church bell at the end of "High Hopes" to a new bicycle bell sound effect before "Bike" begins. A 7-inch vinyl version of the single was released on a transparent record.

An early version of the song appeared on the 2019 box set The Later Years and was released as one of the preview tracks. Unlike the album version, this features the final solo played on a regular electric guitar instead of a lapsteel.

== Composition ==
The song is mostly in the key of C minor, and features the sound of a church bell chiming a 'C' throughout, except for a short section in the middle where the song briefly modulates into E minor for a guitar solo. The bell was taken from a sound effects record that had previously been used on "Fat Old Sun" from Atom Heart Mother, as well as the song "Big Black Smoke" by The Kinks.

The lyrics refer to the band's early days in Cambridge, specifically before they started making music. It references landmarks such as "Long Road" and "The Cut", as well as Cambridge as a location for "magnets and miracles". The video also references ex-bandmate Syd Barrett. Its lyrics speak of the things one may have gained and lost in life, written from Gilmour's autobiographic perspective. Gilmour has said that the song is more about his early days and leaving his hometown behind than about the seeds of division supposedly planted in Pink Floyd's early days.

The final couplet from the song ("The endless river/Forever and ever") recalls a line from the band's second single, "See Emily Play", from 1967, ("Float on a river/Forever and ever"); it inspired the name of their final studio album, The Endless River, released in 2014. Shortly after the song ends and the chimes fade out is a hidden track comprising a brief phone call between the band's manager Steve O'Rourke and Gilmour's son Charlie.

== Track listings ==
UK CD maxi

1. "High Hopes" (radio edit) – 5:16
2. "Keep Talking" (radio edit) – 4:55
3. "One of These Days" (live) – 6:57

France CD single / Netherlands promo CD single

1. "High Hopes" – 8:34
2. "Marooned" – 5:29

== Music video ==
The music video, directed by Storm Thorgerson, features a man looking over the Fens at Ely Cathedral, the same building which can be seen between the metal heads on the cover of the album. Also, the video has many references to Cambridge, where Syd Barrett, Roger Waters and David Gilmour grew up, college scarves, bicycles and punts on the river being obvious ones. In particular many scenes are set in St John's College, Cambridge, including the Bridge of Sighs. Also shown is an oversized bust of Syd Barrett. It was later used in live performances during the Division Bell Tour and seen on the Pulse video.

== Personnel ==
The Division Bell

- David Gilmour – lead and backing vocals, bass guitar, classical guitar and lap steel guitars
- Richard Wright – Kurzweil synthesisers
- Nick Mason – drums, tambourine, church bell

Additional musicians:

- Jon Carin – piano
- Michael Kamen – orchestrations
- Edward Shearmur – orchestrations

Pulse

- David Gilmour – lead vocals, classical guitar and lap steel guitars
- Richard Wright – Kurzweil synthesisers, Hammond Organ
- Nick Mason – drums, gong

with:

- Jon Carin – piano, keyboards, additional and backing vocals
- Guy Pratt – bass, backing vocals
- Tim Renwick – classical guitar
- Gary Wallis – percussion, church bell, drum kit
- Sam Brown – backing vocals
- Claudia Fontaine – backing vocals
- Durga McBroom – backing vocals

== Cover versions ==
- The song was covered by Shark 'n the Smoke on the 2003 tribute album A Fair Forgery of Pink Floyd.
- The song was covered by Nightwish who released two different live versions; one on the compilation album Highest Hopes: The Best of Nightwish and another one on the live DVD End of an Era.
- The song was covered by Gregorian for their album Masters of Chant Chapter IV.
- The song was covered by the German band Sylvan in 2000 for the album Signs of Life – A Tribute to Pink Floyd.
- The song was covered by the French power metal band Karelia in 2005 for the album Raise.
- The song was covered by the German Metalcore band Caliban in 2012 for the deluxe version of I Am Nemesis.
- The song was covered by the Scottish vocalist Ray Wilson in 2016 for his acoustic album Song for a Friend.
- The song was covered by actor, comedian and vocalist Alexander Armstrong in 2016 for his second studio album Upon a Different Shore.
- The song was covered by French neofolk group SKÁLD in 2019 for the Alfar Fagrahvél edition of their album Vikings Chant.

== Charts ==
Chart (1994)	Peak position
Canada Singles Chart	43
French SNEP Singles Chart	4
UK Singles Chart	26
U.S. Billboard Album Rock Tracks	7

Year-end chart (1994)	Position
French Singles Chart	36
