= Keep Talking (Pink Floyd song) =

1994 song by Pink Floyd

Promotional single by Pink Floyd

from the album The Division Bell
- Released: 12 March 1994
- Recorded: 1993
- Studio: Astoria (London)
- Length: 6:10 (album version); 4:55 (radio edit); 3:20 (France promo); 5:56 (Echoes: The Best of Pink Floyd version)
- Label: EMI (Europe); Columbia (US)
- Songwriters: David Gilmour; Richard Wright; Polly Samson
- Producers: Bob Ezrin; David Gilmour

Pink Floyd singles chronology
"One Slip" (1988)	"Keep Talking" (1994)	"Lost for Words" (1994)

Audio video
- "Keep Talking" on YouTube

"Keep Talking"

Single by Pink Floyd

from the album The Division Bell
- A-side: "High Hopes" (double A-side)
- B-side: "One of These Days (Live)"
- Released: 10 October 1994
- Label: EMI; Columbia

Pink Floyd singles chronology
"Take It Back" (1994)	"Keep Talking" / "High Hopes" (1994)	"Wish You Were Here (Live)" (1995)

"Keep Talking" is a song from Pink Floyd's 1994 album, The Division Bell.

== Recording ==
Written by David Gilmour, Richard Wright and Polly Samson, it is sung by Gilmour and also features samples of Stephen Hawking's electronic voice, taken from a BT television advertisement. This same commercial was sampled again in "Talkin' Hawkin'" from Pink Floyd's final studio album, The Endless River. Gilmour chose to use the speech after nearly crying to the commercial, which he described as "the most powerful piece of television advertising that I've ever seen in my life." The song also makes use of the talk box guitar effect.

== Release ==
The song was the first to be sent to radio stations from the album in the United States in March 1994. It was the group's third #1 hit on the Album Rock Tracks chart (a chart published by Billboard magazine which measures radio play in the United States, and is not a measure of record sales), staying atop for six weeks.

The song was included on the 2001 compilation, Echoes: The Best of Pink Floyd.

== Live ==
The song was performed every night during the 1994 The Division Bell Tour and live versions, taken from different shows, were included in both the album Pulse and the video of the same name.

The song was sampled by Wiz Khalifa on the title track of his 2009 mixtape Burn After Rolling.

== Quotes ==
[Interviewer:] Several songs on the album, like "Keep Talking" suggest that all problems can be solved through discussion. Do you believe that?
[Gilmour:] It's more of a wish than a belief. [laughs]

— David Gilmour, 1994

Well, I guess I experiment more than I think I do. I had a Zoom [effects box] in my control room one day and I was mucking about with something. Suddenly, I thought I should stick the E-bow on the strings and see what would happen. It sounded great, so we started writing a little duet for the E-bowed acoustic guitar [a Gibson J-200] and a keyboard. We never finished the piece, but Jon Carin [keyboardist] decided to sample the E-bowed guitar part. We kept the sample and ended up using it as a loop on "Take It Back", and again on "Keep Talking".

— David Gilmour, 1994

== Personnel ==
Pink Floyd

- David Gilmour – lead vocals, guitar, talk box, EBow
- Richard Wright – Hammond organ, synthesizer
- Nick Mason – drums, percussion

Additional musicians

- Gary Wallis – programming
- Jon Carin – programming, additional keyboards
- Guy Pratt – bass guitar
- Sam Brown – backing vocals
- Durga McBroom – backing vocals
- Carol Kenyon – backing vocals
- Jackie Sheridan – backing vocals
- Rebecca Leigh-White – backing vocals
- Stephen Hawking – computer voice, sampled

== Charts ==
=== Weekly charts ===
Chart (1994)	Peak position
Canada Top Singles (RPM)	8
Europe (European Hit Radio)	32
UK Singles (OCC)	26
US Album Rock Tracks (Billboard)	1

=== Year-end charts ===
Chart (1994)	Position
Canada Top Singles (RPM)	64

== Release history ==
Region	Date	Format	Label	Catalog no.
United States	12 March 1994	CD-R (Modern rock/Alternative radio)	Columbia Records	CSK 6228
United Kingdom	28 March 1994	CD-R (Contemporary hit radio, BBC Radio 1 rotation)	EMI	PINK 1
United Kingdom	10 October 1994	CD-R (Contemporary hit radio, BBC Radio 1 rotation)	EMI	CDEMDJ 342
