= Pulse (Pink Floyd album) =

Live album by Pink Floyd
- Released: 29 May 1995
- Recorded: 17 August–23 October 1994
- Genres: Progressive rock, psychedelic rock
- Length: 147:59
- Label: EMI
- Producers: James Guthrie; David Gilmour

Pink Floyd chronology
The Division Bell (1994)	Pulse (1995)	London '66–'67 (1995)

Singles from Pulse
- 1. "Wish You Were Here" Released: 20 July 1995

Pulse is the third live album by the English rock band Pink Floyd, released on 29 May 1995 by EMI in the United Kingdom and on 6 June 1995 by Columbia in the United States. It was recorded during the European leg of Pink Floyd's Division Bell Tour in 1994.

== Content and recording ==
Pulse includes a performance of the entirety of Pink Floyd's 1973 album The Dark Side of the Moon. It also features "Astronomy Domine", a Syd Barrett song not performed since the early 1970s. "Another Brick in the Wall, Part II" features small portions of the songs "Another Brick in the Wall, Part I", "The Happiest Days of Our Lives" and "Another Brick in the Wall, Part III".

Unlike the previous Pink Floyd live album, Delicate Sound of Thunder, no parts were re-recorded in the studio. However, the band and producer James Guthrie fixed songs that had bad notes (as heard on some bootlegs) by lifting solos and corrected vocal lines from other performances as the band recorded most of the European leg. The album was mixed in QSound, which produces a 3D audio effect even on a two channel stereo system.

== Packaging ==
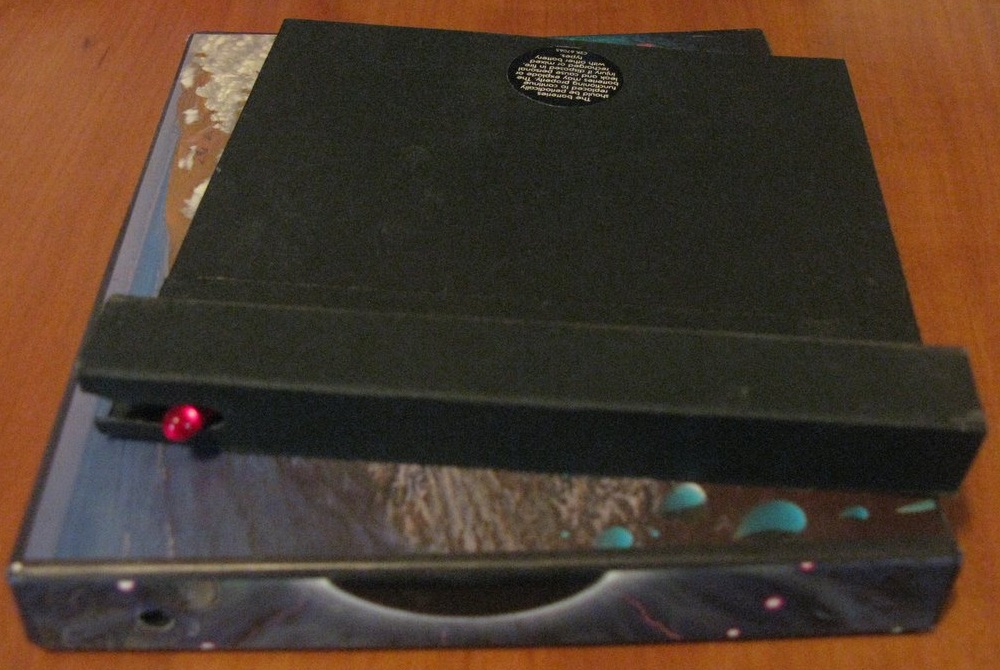
The outer packaging for Pulse with the light compartment and holder removed and placed on top.

Early CD versions came with a flashing red LED on the side of the case. This was designed by the EMI contractor Jon Kempner, using the now discontinued LM3909 LED flasher IC. The circuit was powered by a single AA battery; the battery life was stated to be over six months. Some versions were also made with two AA batteries and later editions of the CD set did not feature the blinking LED. Kempner was awarded a platinum disc.

Essentially, it's a device which we thought was entertaining. It's an idea of Storm Thorgerson's which related to Dark Side and the pulse, and it's a live album so the box is "alive". After that, in terms of seriously deep meanings, one might be struggling a bit.

— Nick Mason

== Release ==
In the United States, despite a price of $34.99 (equivalent to $70 in 2023) (which included flashing spine light and two AA batteries) Pulse debuted at number one on the Billboard 200 during the week of 24 June 1995 with 198,000 copies sold, it became the first multidisc album to top the Billboard 200 since the chart started using SoundScan data in May 1991. The next week it fell off to number three on the chart. It remained on the chart for 22 weeks. It was certified two times platinum by the RIAA on 31 July 1995 for shipments of one million units.

On 1 July 1995 the video version of Pulse debuted at number one on the Billboard's Top Music Videos chart with 16,500 units sold. The video was certified eight times platinum by the RIAA on 31 July 2006 for shipments of 800,000 units.

The video version (on VHS and Laserdisc) also featured the song "Take It Back", and an almost complete performance from their 20 October show at Earl's Court, London. The Pulse DVD was released on 10 July 2006. On 16 December 2021, the band announced on social media platforms that a re-release of Pulse on DVD and a first-time release on Blu-ray format was on 18 February 2022. The packaging re-introduced the blinking LED featured with the original CD release from 1995.

The vinyl version was released as a four-LP box set and included "One of These Days" (also heard on the cassette release) as well as a large version of the photo booklet. The release of the album was promoted by a light show from the top of the Empire State Building in New York City with music simulcasted on a New York City radio station.

== Reception ==
Professional ratings
Review scores
Source	Rating
AllMusic	2/5 stars
The Encyclopedia of Popular Music	3/5 stars
NME	2/10
Rolling Stone	1.5/5 stars

Writing for NME, Paul Moody wrote that Pulse comprised "a rehash of the usual prog meanderings ... Every perfectly recorded note and every immaculately reproduced photo tells you that this is music for the sort of hand-wringing hippies who still like to think they're in tune with the cosmos even though there's a BMW in the drive." He was critical of the LED on the packaging, saying it "represents the multi-million pound rehabilitation of Pink Floyd by a generation who progged out in the 70s, sold out in the 80s and started gloating about it in the 90s in the gauchest possible terms".

In Rolling Stone, Rob O'Connor argued that the "studio perfection" of The Dark Side of the Moon did not translate well to live performance, and criticised the "loud, annoying" audience.

== Track listing ==
Disc one
No.	Title	Music	Lead vocals	Length
1.	"Shine On You Crazy Diamond, Parts 1-5 & 7" (20 October 1994, Earl's Court, London)	David Gilmour; Roger Waters; Richard Wright	David Gilmour	13:35
2.	"Astronomy Domine" (15 October 1994, Earl's Court, London)	Syd Barrett	Gilmour; Wright	4:20
3.	"What Do You Want From Me" (21 September 1994, Cinecittà, Rome)	Gilmour; Wright; Polly Samson	Gilmour	4:10
4.	"Learning to Fly" (14 October 1994, Earl's Court, London)	Gilmour; Anthony Moore; Bob Ezrin; Jon Carin	Gilmour	5:16
5.	"Keep Talking" (17 August 1994, Niedersachsenstadion, Hanover)	Gilmour; Wright; Samson	Gilmour	6:52
6.	"Coming Back to Life" (13 October 1994, Earl's Court, London)	Gilmour	Gilmour	6:56
7.	"Hey You" (13, 15 October 1994, Earl's Court, London)	Waters	Gilmour, Jon Carin	4:40
8.	"A Great Day for Freedom" (13 September 1994, Stadio Delle Alpi, Turin, & 19 October 1994, Earl's Court, London)	Gilmour; Samson	Gilmour	4:30
9.	"Sorrow" (20 September 1994, Cinecittà, Rome)	Gilmour	Gilmour	10:49
10.	"High Hopes" (14, 19, 20, 21, 29 October 1994, Earl's Court, London)	Gilmour; Samson	Gilmour	7:52
11.	"Another Brick in the Wall, Part II" (20, 21 October 1994, Earl's Court, London)	Waters	Gilmour; Guy Pratt	7:08
12.	"One of These Days (LP and Cassette Exclusive)" (16, 19, October 1994, Earl's Court, London)	Gilmour; Waters; Wright; Mason	Instrumental	7:05
Total length:				75:50

Disc two
No.	Title	Music	Lead vocals	Length
1.	"Speak to Me" (20 September 1994, Cinecittà, Rome,)	Nick Mason	Instrumental	2:30
2.	"Breathe (In the Air)" (20 October 1994, Earl's Court, London)	Gilmour; Waters; Wright	Gilmour	2:33
3.	"On the Run" (20, October 1994, Earl's Court, London)	Gilmour; Waters	Instrumental	3:48
4.	"Time / Breathe (Reprise)" (17 September 1994, Festa de l'Unita, Módena, 20 September 1994, Cinecettà, Rome, & 20 October 1994, Earl's Court, London)	Gilmour; Waters; Wright; Mason	Gilmour; Wright	6:47
5.	"The Great Gig in the Sky" (20 October 1994, Earl's Court, London)	Wright; Clare Torry	Sam Brown; Durga McBroom; Claudia Fontaine	5:52
6.	"Money" (17 September 1994, Festa de l'Unita, Modena)	Waters	Gilmour	8:54
7.	"Us and Them" (19, 20 October 1994, Earl's Court, London)	Waters; Wright	Gilmour	6:58
8.	"Any Colour You Like" (19, 23 October 1994, Earl's Court, London)	Gilmour; Wright; Mason	Instrumental	3:21
9.	"Brain Damage" (19 October 1994, Earl's Court, London)	Waters	Gilmour	3:46
10.	"Eclipse" (19 October 1994, Earl's Court, London)	Waters	Gilmour	2:38
11.	"Wish You Were Here" (20 September 1994, Cinecittà, Rome)	Gilmour; Waters	Gilmour	6:35
12.	"Comfortably Numb" (20 October 1994, Earl's Court, London)	Gilmour; Waters	Wright; Pratt; Carin; Gilmour	9:29
13.	"Run Like Hell" (15 October 1994, Earl's Court, London)	Gilmour; Waters	Gilmour; Pratt	8:36
Total length:				71:57

== Personnel ==
=== Pink Floyd ===
- David Gilmour – lead vocals, lead guitar, acoustic guitar and lap steel guitar (on "One of These Days", "High Hopes" and "The Great Gig In the Sky")
- Nick Mason – drums, percussion (on "Time")
- Richard Wright – keyboards, synthesiser, backing vocals, lead vocals on "Astronomy Domine", co-lead vocals on "Time", "Us and Them" and "Comfortably Numb"

=== Additional personnel ===
- Guy Pratt – bass, backing vocals, co-lead vocals on "Run Like Hell"
- Jon Carin – keyboards, backing vocals, co-lead vocals on "Hey You"
- Sam Brown – backing vocals, first vocalist on "The Great Gig in the Sky"
- Durga McBroom – backing vocals, second vocalist on "The Great Gig in the Sky"
- Claudia Fontaine – backing vocals, third vocalist on "The Great Gig in the Sky"
- Tim Renwick – guitar, backing vocals
- Dick Parry – saxophone
- Gary Wallis – percussion, additional drums
- Doug Sax, Ron Lewter – mastering at The Mastering Lab

== Charts ==
=== Weekly charts ===
Weekly chart performance for Pulse
Chart (1995)	Peak position
Australian Albums (ARIA)	1
Austrian Albums (Ö3 Austria)	1
Belgian Albums (Ultratop Flanders)	1
Belgian Albums (Ultratop Wallonia)	2
Canada Top Albums/CDs (RPM)	1
Danish Albums (IFPI)	4
Dutch Albums (Album Top 100)	1
Europe (European Top 100 Albums)	1
Finnish Albums (Suomen virallinen lista)	11
French Albums (SNEP)	1
German Albums (Offizielle Top 100)	1
Greek Albums (IFPI)	7
Hungarian Albums (MAHASZ)	28
Italian Albums (FIMI)	1
Italian Albums (Musica e Dischi)	3
Irish Albums (IFPI Ireland)	2
New Zealand Albums (RMNZ)	1
Norwegian Albums (VG-lista)	1
Portuguese Albums (AFP)	1
Scottish Albums (Official Charts)	1
Spanish Albums (AFYVE)	5
Swedish Albums (Sverigetopplistan)	2
Swiss Albums (Schweizer Hitparade)	1
UK Albums (Official Charts)	1
US Billboard 200	1

Chart (2022–2025)	Peak position
Greek Albums (IFPI)	1
Hungarian Albums (MAHASZ)	4
Polish Albums (ZPAV)	14

Weekly chart performance for Jewel case edition
Chart (2006)	Peak position
Italian Albums (Musica e Dischi)	13

=== Year-end charts ===
1995 year-end chart performance for Pulse
Chart (1995)	Position
Austrian Albums (Ö3 Austria)	11
Belgian Albums (Ultratop Flanders)	38
Belgian Albums (Ultratop Wallonia)	16
Dutch Albums (Album Top 100)	27
Europe (European Top 100 Albums)	13
French Albums (SNEP)	16
German Albums (Offizielle Top 100)	18
New Zealand Albums (RMNZ)	8
Swiss Albums (Schweizer Hitparade)	14
UK Albums (OCC)	43
US Billboard 200	85

== Certifications and sales ==
Certifications and sales for Pulse
Region	Certification	Certified units/sales
Argentina (CAPIF)	Gold	30,000^{^}
Australia (ARIA) video	14× Platinum	210,000^{^}
Australia (ARIA)	Platinum	70,000^{^}
Austria (IFPI Austria)	Platinum	50,000^{*}
Belgium (BRMA)	Gold	25,000^{*}
Brazil (Pro-Música Brasil) video	2× Platinum	100,000^{*}
Brazil (Pro-Música Brasil) video - NTSC version, No Subtitles	Diamond	100,000^{*}
Canada (Music Canada)	3× Platinum	300,000^{^}
Canada (Music Canada) video	Platinum	10,000^{^}
Finland (Musiikkituottajat) video	Gold	13,965
France (SNEP)	Platinum	300,000^{*}
Germany (BVMI)	Platinum	500,000^{^}
Germany (BVMI) video	7× Gold	175,000^{^}
Italy (FIMI)	Gold	25,000^{*}
Italy Dvd 2006 sales	—	120,000
Netherlands (NVPI)	Gold	50,000^{^}
New Zealand (RMNZ)	Platinum	15,000^{^}
Poland (ZPAV)	Platinum	70,000^{*}
Poland (ZPAV) video	3× Platinum	30,000^{*}
Portugal (AFP) video	4× Platinum	32,000^{^}
Spain (Promusicae)	Gold	50,000^{^}
Switzerland (IFPI Switzerland)	Platinum	50,000^{^}
United Kingdom (BPI)	Platinum	349,428
United States (RIAA)	2× Platinum	1,480,000
United States (RIAA) video	8× Platinum	400,000^{^}
Summaries
Europe (IFPI)	Platinum	1,000,000^{*}
^{*} Sales figures based on certification alone.^{^} Shipments figures based on certification alone.
