= The Division Bell =

- Artwork for original LP release (Note: The alternate digital one features a different tint to the cover and shows 3 red flags placed on the land)

Studio album by Pink Floyd
- Released: 28 March 1994
- Recorded: January–December 1993
- Studios: Britannia Row, Astoria, Abbey Road, and Metropolis in London; The Creek
- Genres: Progressive rock; new age
- Length: 66:23 (CD & 2014 LP); 58:47 (1994 LP)
- Labels: EMI; Columbia
- Producers: Bob Ezrin; David Gilmour

Pink Floyd chronology
Shine On (1992)	The Division Bell (1994)	Pulse (1995)

Singles from The Division Bell
- 1. "Take It Back" Released: 23 May 1994; 2. "High Hopes" / "Keep Talking" Released: 10 October 1994

The Division Bell is the fourteenth studio album by the English rock band Pink Floyd, released on 28 March 1994 by EMI Records in the United Kingdom and on 5 April by Columbia Records in the United States.

The second Pink Floyd album recorded without the founder member Roger Waters, The Division Bell was written mostly by the guitarist and singer, David Gilmour, and the keyboardist, Richard Wright. It features Wright's first lead vocal on a Pink Floyd album since The Dark Side of the Moon (1973). Gilmour's fiancée, the novelist Polly Samson, co-wrote many of the lyrics, which deal with themes of communication. It was the last Pink Floyd studio album to be composed of entirely new material, and the last recorded with Wright, who died in 2008.

Recording took place in locations including Pink Floyd's Britannia Row Studios and Gilmour's houseboat, Astoria. The production team included longtime Pink Floyd collaborators such as the producer Bob Ezrin, the engineer Andy Jackson, the saxophonist Dick Parry and the bassist Guy Pratt.

The Division Bell received mixed reviews, but reached number one in more than 10 countries, including the UK and the US. In the US, it was certified double platinum in 1994 and triple platinum in 1999. To promote the album, the band embarked on the Division Bell Tour two days after its release, with concerts in North America and Europe; the tour sold more than 5 million tickets and made around $100 million in gross income. Pulse, a live album and video recorded during the final London dates, was released in 1995. Unused material from the album sessions became part of Pink Floyd's next and final album, The Endless River (2014).

== Recording ==
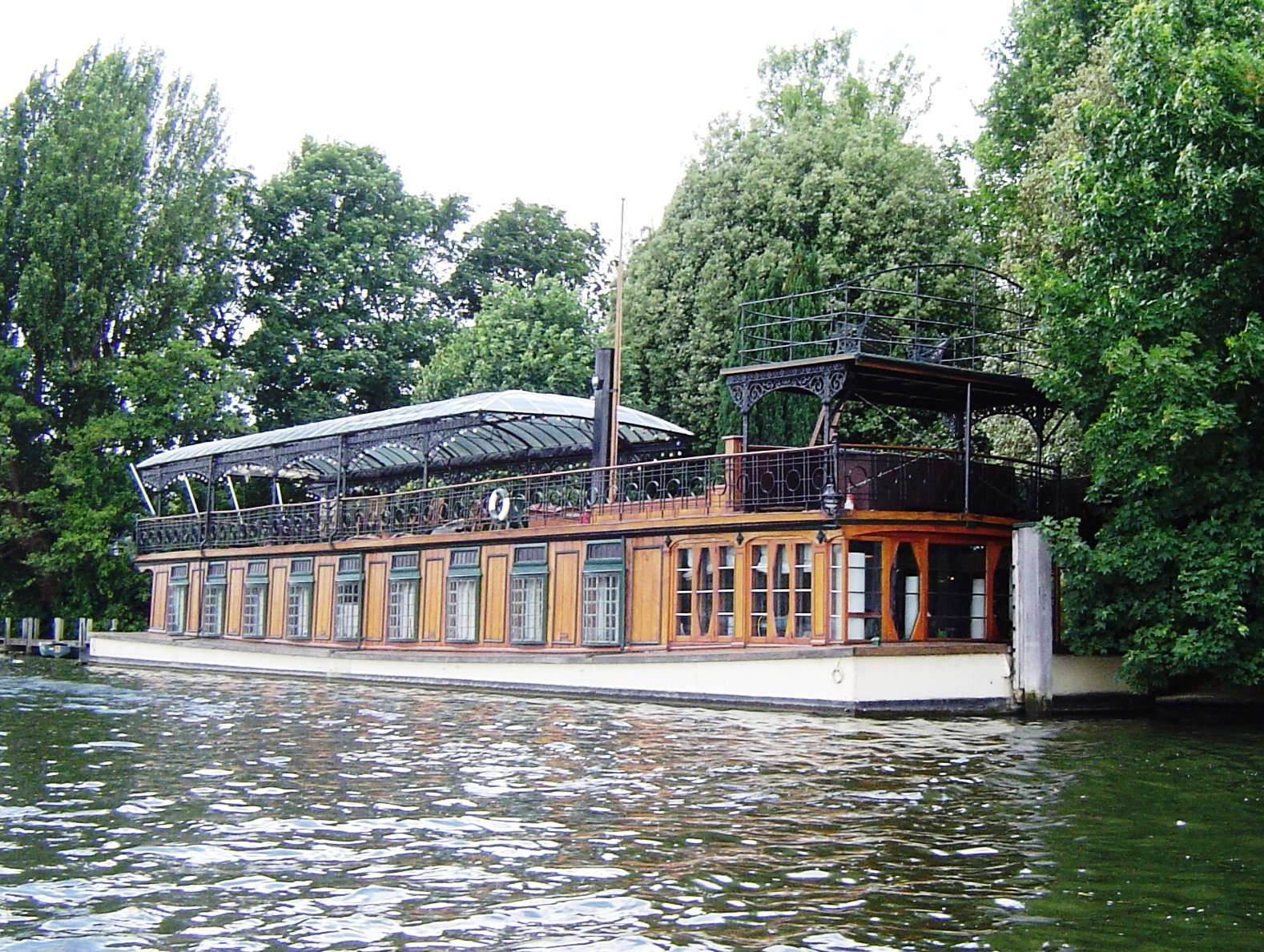
David Gilmour's recording studio, Astoria

In January 1993, guitarist David Gilmour, drummer Nick Mason and keyboardist Richard Wright began improvising new material in sessions at the remodelled Britannia Row Studios. They recruited bassist Guy Pratt, who had joined Pink Floyd on their Momentary Lapse of Reason Tour; according to Mason, Pratt's playing influenced the mood of the music. Without the legal problems that had dogged the production of their 1987 album A Momentary Lapse of Reason, Gilmour was at ease. If he felt the band were making progress, he would record them on a two-track DAT recorder. At one point, Gilmour surreptitiously recorded Wright playing, capturing material that formed the basis for three pieces of music.

After about two weeks, the band had around 65 pieces of music. With engineer Andy Jackson and co-producer Bob Ezrin, production moved to Gilmour's houseboat and recording studio, Astoria. The band voted on each track, and whittled the material down to about 27 pieces. Eliminating some tracks, and merging others, they arrived at about 11 songs. Song selection was based upon a system of points, whereby all three members would award marks out of ten to each candidate song, a system skewed by Wright awarding his songs ten points each and the others none. Wright, having resigned under pressure from the bassist, Roger Waters, in 1979, was not contractually a full member of the band, which upset him. Wright reflected: "It came very close to a point where I wasn't going to do the album, because I didn't feel that what we'd agreed was fair." Wright received his first songwriting credits on any Pink Floyd album since 1975's Wish You Were Here.

"Wearing the Inside Out"
"Wearing the Inside Out" contains Richard Wright's first prominent vocal contribution to a Pink Floyd album since 1973's The Dark Side of the Moon.

Gilmour's fiancée, the novelist Polly Samson, also received songwriting credits. Initially, her role was limited to providing encouragement for Gilmour, but she helped him write "High Hopes", a song about Gilmour's childhood in Cambridge. She co-wrote a further six songs, which bothered Ezrin. Gilmour said that Samson's contributions had "ruffled the management's [feathers]", but Ezrin later reflected that her presence had been inspirational for Gilmour, and that she "pulled the whole album together". She also helped Gilmour with the cocaine addiction he had developed following his divorce. Samson did not want credit, saying "the idea of my name being attached to Pink Floyd was like some nightmare", but Gilmour insisted, telling her she would regret going uncredited. She later said he was right, and that she had become used to him singing her lyrics.

The keyboardist Jon Carin, the percussionist Gary Wallis, backing vocalists including Sam Brown and the Momentary Lapse tour singer Durga McBroom were brought in before recording began. The band moved to Olympic Studios and recorded most of the tracks over the space of a week. After a summer break, they returned to Astoria to record more backing tracks. Ezrin worked on the drum sounds, and the Pink Floyd collaborator Michael Kamen provided the string arrangements, which were recorded at Abbey Road Studio Two by Steve McLaughlin. Dick Parry played saxophone on his first Pink Floyd album for almost 20 years, on "Wearing the Inside Out", and Chris Thomas created the final mix.

With the aid of Gilmour's guitar technician, Phil Taylor, Carin located some of Pink Floyd's older keyboards from storage, including a Farfisa organ. Sounds sampled from these instruments were used on "Take It Back" and "Marooned". Additional keyboards were played by Carin, along with Bob Ezrin. Durga McBroom supplied backing vocals alongside Sam Brown, Carol Kenyon, Jackie Sheridan, and Rebecca Leigh-White. "What Do You Want from Me" was influenced by Chicago blues, and "Poles Apart" contains folksy overtones. Gilmour's improvised guitar solos on "Marooned" used a DigiTech Whammy pedal to pitch-shift the guitar notes over an octave. On "Take It Back", he used a Gibson J-200 guitar through a Zoom effects unit, played with an EBow, an electronic device which produces sounds similar to a bow.

Between September and December recording and mixing sessions were held at Metropolis Studios in Chiswick and the Creek Recording Studios in London. In September, Pink Floyd performed at a celebrity charity concert at Cowdray House, in Midhurst. The album was mastered at the Mastering Lab in Los Angeles, by Doug Sax and James Guthrie. (Note: See sleeve notes.)

Jackson edited unused material from the Division Bell sessions, described by Mason as ambient music, into an hour-long composition tentatively titled The Big Spliff, but Pink Floyd did not release it. Some of The Big Spliff was used to create the next Pink Floyd album, The Endless River (2014).

== Themes ==
The Division Bell deals with themes of communication and the idea that talking can solve many problems. In the Studio radio host Redbeard suggested that the album offers "the very real possibility of transcending it all, through shivering moments of grace". Songs such as "Poles Apart" and "Lost for Words" have been interpreted by fans and critics as references to the estrangement between Pink Floyd and their former member Roger Waters, who left in 1985, however Gilmour denied this and said: "People can invent and relate to a song in their personal ways but it's a little late at this point for us to be conjuring Roger up." The title refers to the division bell rung in the British parliament to announce a vote. (Note: The bell used at the end of the album is not the bell used in Parliament) Mason said: "It's about people making choices, yeas or nays."

Produced a few years after the collapse of the Eastern Bloc, "A Great Day for Freedom" juxtaposes the general euphoria of the fall of the Berlin Wall with the subsequent wars and ethnic cleansing, particularly in the former Yugoslavia. Audio samples of Stephen Hawking, originally recorded for a BT television advertisement, were used in "Keep Talking"; Gilmour was so moved by Hawking's sentiment in the advert that he contacted the advertising company for permission to use the recordings. Mason said it felt "politically incorrect to take ideas from advertising but it seemed a very relevant piece". At the end of the album, Gilmour's stepson Charlie is heard hanging up the telephone receiver on Pink Floyd manager Steve O'Rourke, who had pleaded to be allowed to appear on a Pink Floyd album.

== Title and packaging ==
The album feels much more home-made, very much as a band playing together in one space. I think that Rick in particular felt significantly more integrated in the process this time, compared to Momentary Lapse. It was nice to have him back.

— Nick Mason (2005)

To avoid competing against other album releases, as had happened with A Momentary Lapse, Pink Floyd set a deadline of April 1994, at which point they would begin a new tour. By January of that year, however, the band still had not decided on an album title. Titles considered included Pow Wow and Down to Earth. At a dinner one night, writer Douglas Adams, spurred by the promise of a payment to his favourite charity, the Environmental Investigation Agency, suggested The Division Bell, a term which appears in "High Hopes".

Pink Floyd's longtime collaborator Storm Thorgerson created the album artwork. He erected two large metal heads, each the height of a double-decker bus, in a field near Stuntney, Cambridgeshire. The sculptures were positioned together and photographed in profile, and can be seen as two faces talking to each other or as a single, third face. Thorgerson said the "third absent face" was a reference to Syd Barrett. The sculptures were devised by Keith Breeden, and constructed by John Robertson. Ely Cathedral is visible on the horizon. The pictures were shot in February for optimal lighting conditions. In 2001, the sculptures were in the Rock and Roll Hall of Fame in Cleveland, Ohio. In 2017, they were moved to the London Victoria and Albert Museum for display in a Pink Floyd exhibition. An alternate version of the cover photo, featuring two 7.5-metre (25 ft) stone sculptures by Aden Hynes, (Note: See sleeve notes.) was used on the compact cassette release and the tour brochure.

== Release and promotion ==
On 10 January 1994 a press reception to announce The Division Bell and the tour was held at a former US Naval Air Station in North Carolina, in the US. A purpose-built Skyship 600 airship, manufactured in the UK, toured the US until it returned to Weeksville, and was destroyed by a thunderstorm on 27 June. Pieces of the aircraft were sold as souvenirs. The band held another reception, in the UK, on 21 March. This time they used an A60 airship, translucent, and painted to look like a fish, which took journalists on a tour of London. The airship, which was lit internally so it glowed in the night sky, was also flown in northern Europe.

During the Division Bell tour, an anonymous person using the name Publius posted on an internet newsgroup, inviting fans to solve a riddle supposedly concealed in the album. The message was verified during a show in East Rutherford, where lights in front of the stage spelled "Enigma Publius". During a televised concert at Earls Court, London, in October 1994, the word "enigma" was projected in large letters on to the backdrop of the stage. The riddle has never been solved. Gilmour and Mason later said it was created as a marketing ploy by EMI. According to Mason, the prize was to be "a crop of trees planted in a clear-cut area of forest or something to that effect ... a touchy-feely sort of gift that was more of a philanthropic thing than something you could hang on the wall".

== Sales ==
The Division Bell was released in the UK by EMI Records on 28 March 1994, (Note: UK EMI EMD 1055 (vinyl), EMI CD EMD 1055 (CD)) and in the US on 5 April, (Note: US Columbia C 64200 (vinyl), Columbia CK 64200 (CD)) and went straight to number one in both countries. The Division Bell was certified silver and gold in the UK on 1 April 1994, platinum a month later and 2× platinum on 1 October. In the US, it was certified gold and double platinum on 6 June 1994, and triple platinum on 29 January 1999.

In the United States the album debuted at number one in the Billboard 200 during the week of 23 April 1994 selling more than 460,000 units, at the time it was the 12th largest single-week total since Billboard began using SoundScan data in May 1991 and also became the fifth-largest first-week sales sum back then. The next week it stayed at the top of the chart selling a little less than half its first-week total, it moved 226,000 units during its second week on chart. The next week sales slid by 30% from last week's sum selling 157,000 units, despite this sales decrease the album stayed at number one. The following week, on 14 May 1994 The Division Bell remained at number one on the Billboard 200 and sales declined by 17%. In its fifth week, it fell off to the fourth place on the chart. It was present on the Billboard 200 for 53 weeks. It was certified three times platinum by the RIAA on 29 January 1999 for shipments of three million units.

== Tour ==
Two days after the album's release, the Division Bell Tour began at Joe Robbie Stadium, in suburban Miami. The set list began with 1967's "Astronomy Domine", before moving to tracks from 1987's A Momentary Lapse of Reason, and The Division Bell. Every show featured over half of Dark Side of the Moon with select shows, starting 15 July in Pontiac, MI, including a complete play-through of this album; material from Wish You Were Here and The Wall was also featured prominently. Backing musicians included Sam Brown, Jon Carin, Claudia Fontaine, Durga McBroom, Dick Parry, Guy Pratt, Tim Renwick, and Gary Wallis.

The tour continued in the US through April, May and mid-June, before moving to Canada, and then returning to the US in July. As the tour reached Europe in late July, Waters declined an invitation to join the band, and later expressed his annoyance that Pink Floyd songs were being performed again in large venues. On the first night of the UK leg of the tour on 12 October, a 1,200-capacity stand collapsed, but with no serious injuries; the performance was rescheduled.

The tour ended at Earls Court on 29 October 1994, and was Pink Floyd's final concert performance until Live 8 in 2005. Estimates placed the total number of tickets sold at over 5.3 million, and gross income at about $100 million. A live album and video, Pulse, was released in June 1995.

== Critical reception ==
Professional ratings
Review scores
Source	Rating
AllMusic	2/5 stars
The Encyclopedia of Popular Music	3/5 stars
Entertainment Weekly	D
The Great Rock Discography	6/10
NME	3/10
Paste	6.1/10
PopMatters	7/10
Rolling Stone	2.5/5 stars
Sputnikmusic	4.5/5 stars
Uncut	4/5 stars
Fort Worth Star Telegram	1.5/5 stars

Though regarded by long-time Pink Floyd fans as a return to form, The Division Bell received mixed reviews from critics. Tom Sinclair of Entertainment Weekly wrote that "avarice is the only conceivable explanation for this glib, vacuous cipher of an album, which is notable primarily for its stomach-turning merger of progressive-rock pomposity and New Age noodling". Rolling Stone's Tom Graves criticised Gilmour's performance, writing that his guitar solos had "settled into rambling, indistinct asides that are as forgettable as they used to be indelible ... Only on 'What Do You Want from Me' does Gilmour sound like he cares". Robert Christgau of The Village Voice dismissed The Division Bell as a "dud".

Among British reviewers, David Bennun of Melody Maker praised the opening instrumental "Cluster One" as "magnificent" and "a track to rank with the most fragrant of modern ambient", but found the rest of the album dreary, despite finding "hints" throughout that Gilmour understood the band's strengths. In his review for NME, Tommy Udo similarly praised "Cluster One" for sounding "effortless", despite finding its ambient nature dated and unconnected to "ambient upstarts" the Orb. However, while Udo enjoyed The Division Bell's lengthy instrumentals, he criticised the record overall for its "sixth-form" lyrics and for being "so damned anonymous".

The album won the Grammy for Best Rock Instrumental Performance on "Marooned". The Division Bell was nominated for the 1995 Brit Award for Best Album by a British Artist, but lost to Blur's Parklife.

In 2011, The Division Bell was ranked at number 93 in Q's readers poll of the "250 Best Albums of the Last 25 Years"; the magazine wrote that the record "reconfigured the magisterial prog-rock of the mid-'70s for the late-20th century" and made for a welcome "lap of honour". In Uncut's 2011 Pink Floyd: The Ultimate Music Guide, Graeme Thomson wrote that The Division Bell "might just be the dark horse of the Floyd canon. The opening triptych of songs is a hugely impressive return to something very close to the eternal essence of Pink Floyd, and much of the rest retains a quiet power and a meditative quality that betrays a genuine sense of unity." In 2014, Uncut reviewed the album again for its 20th-anniversary reissue, and praised its production, writing that it sounded much "more like a classic Pink Floyd album" than The Final Cut (1983) and that the connection between Wright and Gilmour was "the album's musical heart". Waters, who left Pink Floyd in 1985, dismissed The Division Bell as "just rubbish ... nonsense from beginning to end".

== Reissues ==
The Division Bell was reissued in 2011. It was remastered by Andy Jackson and released as a standalone CD and as part of the Discovery box set.

It was reissued again on 30 June 2014, as a "20th anniversary deluxe edition" box set and a 20th anniversary double-LP vinyl reissue. The instrumental piece "Marooned" served as the set's lead single with a new video filmed at Pripyat. The box set contains the 2011 remaster of the album; a 5.1 surround sound remix by Jackson; 2-LP record on 180g vinyl; a red 7" "Take It Back" single; a clear 7" "High Hopes/Keep Talking" single; a blue, laser-etched 12" "High Hopes" single; book and assorted art cards. The 2014 reissues saw the first release of the full album on vinyl as the 1994 vinyl release saw only edited versions of the songs to keep it to a single LP. The Division Bell was reissued again with the Pink Floyd Records label on 26 August 2016. A limited-edition 25th anniversary double-LP was released on 7 June 2019. The reissue is on blue vinyl and uses the two-LP master created for the 20th anniversary vinyl release.

== Track listing ==
=== Original release ===
All lyrics are written by David Gilmour and Polly Samson and all music is composed by Gilmour, except where noted.

No.	Title	Lyrics	Music	Length
1.	"Cluster One"	instrumental	David Gilmour; Richard Wright	5:56
2.	"What Do You Want from Me"		Gilmour; Wright	4:22
3.	"Poles Apart"	Gilmour; Samson; Nick Laird-Clowes		7:03
4.	"Marooned"	instrumental	Wright; Gilmour	5:30
5.	"A Great Day for Freedom"			4:16
6.	"Wearing the Inside Out"	Anthony Moore	Wright	6:49
7.	"Take It Back"	Gilmour; Samson; Laird-Clowes	Gilmour; Bob Ezrin	6:12
8.	"Coming Back to Life"	Gilmour		6:19
9.	"Keep Talking"		Gilmour; Wright	6:11
10.	"Lost for Words"			5:15
11.	"High Hopes"			8:31
Total length:				66:23

== Personnel ==
Pink Floyd

- David Gilmour – lead vocals, guitars, bass, keyboards, programming
- Nick Mason – drums, percussion
- Richard Wright – keyboards, lead vocals on "Wearing the Inside Out", backing vocals

Additional musicians

- Jon Carin – additional keyboards, programming
- Guy Pratt – bass guitar
- Gary Wallis – percussion programming and performance
- Tim Renwick – additional guitars
- Dick Parry – tenor saxophone
- Bob Ezrin – percussion, keyboards
- Sam Brown – backing vocals
- Durga McBroom – backing vocals
- Carol Kenyon – backing vocals
- Jackie Sheridan – backing vocals
- Rebecca Leigh-White – backing vocals
- Michael Kamen – orchestral arrangements
- Edward Shearmur – orchestrations
- Stephen Hawking – speech synthesis (on Keep Talking)

Production

- David Gilmour – production, mixing
- Bob Ezrin – production
- Andrew Jackson – engineering
- Steve McLoughlin – orchestra recording
- Chris Thomas – mixing
- James Guthrie – mastering engineer
- Doug Sax – mastering engineer
- Storm Thorgerson – album art design
- Tony May – photography
- Rupert Truman – photography
- Stephen Piotrowski – photography
- Ian Wright – graphics
- Aubrey Powell – album art design (2014 anniversary edition and 2016 Pink Floyd Records re-issues)

== Charts ==
=== Weekly charts ===
Weekly chart performance for The Division Bell
Chart (1994)	Peak position
Argentinian Albums (CAPIF)	1
Australian Albums (ARIA)	1
Austrian Albums (Ö3 Austria)	1
Belgian Albums (SABAM)	1
Canada Top Albums/CDs (RPM)	1
Chilean Albums (APF)	1
Danish Albums (IFPI)	1
Dutch Albums (Album Top 100)	1
European Hot 100 (Music & Media)	1
Finnish Albums (IFPI)	2
French Albums (SNEP)	7
German Albums (Offizielle Top 100)	1
Hong Kong Albums (IFPI Hong Kong)	1
Hungarian Albums (MAHASZ)	6
Irish Albums (IFPI)	1
Italian Albums (Musica e Dischi)	1
New Zealand Albums (RMNZ)	1
Norwegian Albums (VG-lista)	1
Portuguese Albums (AFP)	1
Spanish Albums (AFYVE)	1
Swedish Albums (Sverigetopplistan)	1
Swiss Albums (Schweizer Hitparade)	1
UK Albums (Official Charts)	1
US Billboard 200	1
Chart (1995)	Peak position
French Albums (SNEP)	16
UK Albums (Music Week)	25
Chart (2014)	Peak position
Austrian Albums (Ö3 Austria)	40
Danish Albums (Hitlisten)	31
Dutch Albums (Album Top 100)	64
French Albums (SNEP)	93
German Albums (Offizielle Top 100)	12
Italian Albums (FIMI)	19
Hungarian Albums (MAHASZ)	6
New Zealand Albums (RMNZ)	37
Swedish Albums (Sverigetopplistan)	54
Chart (2018)	Peak position
Polish Albums (ZPAV)	35
Chart (2019)	Peak position
Belgian Albums (Ultratop Flanders)	83
Belgian Albums (Ultratop Wallonia)	29
Croatian International Albums (HDU)	1
Spanish Albums (Promusicae)	49
Chart (2021)	Peak position
Portuguese Albums (AFP)	24

=== Year-end charts ===
1994 year-end chart performance for The Division Bell
Chart (1994)	Position
Australian Albums (ARIA)	19
Austrian Albums (Ö3 Austria)	2
Dutch Albums (Album Top 100)	8
German Albums (Offizielle Top 100)	3
New Zealand Albums (RMNZ)	3
Swiss Albums (Schweizer Hitparade)	3
US Billboard 200	20

== Certifications and sales ==
Certifications and sales for The Division Bell
Region	Certification	Certified units/sales
Argentina (CAPIF)	Platinum	60,000^{^}
Australia (ARIA)	Platinum	70,000^{^}
Austria (IFPI Austria)	Platinum	50,000^{*}
Belgium (BRMA)	Platinum	50,000^{*}
Brazil (Pro-Música Brasil)	Platinum	250,000^{*}
Canada (Music Canada)	4× Platinum	400,000^{^}
Finland (Musiikkituottajat)	Gold	21,183
France (SNEP)	2× Platinum	600,000^{*}
Germany (BVMI)	3× Gold	750,000^{^}
Italy (FIMI) 1994-1995 sales	5× Platinum	560,000
Italy (FIMI) sales since 2009	Platinum	50,000^{‡}
Japan (RIAJ)	Gold	100,000^{^}
Netherlands (NVPI)	Platinum	100,000^{^}
New Zealand (RMNZ)	4× Platinum	60,000^{^}
Norway (IFPI Norway)	2× Platinum	100,000^{*}
Poland (ZPAV) 1994-1996 sales	Gold	50,000^{*}
Poland (ZPAV) 2011 rerelease	Platinum	20,000^{‡}
Spain (Promusicae)	Platinum	100,000^{^}
Sweden (GLF)	Gold	50,000^{^}
Switzerland (IFPI Switzerland)	2× Platinum	100,000^{^}
United Kingdom (BPI)	3× Platinum	900,000^{‡}
United States (RIAA)	3× Platinum	3,330,000
Summaries
Worldwide	—	7,000,000
^{*} Sales figures based on certification alone.^{^} Shipments figures based on certification alone.^{‡} Sales+streaming figures based on certification alone.
