= Lost for Words (Pink Floyd song) =

Promotional single by Pink Floyd

from the album The Division Bell
- Released: 26 March 1994
- Recorded: 1993
- Studio: Astoria (London, United Kingdom)
- Genre: Progressive rock
- Length: 5:14
- Label: Columbia
- Songwriters: David Gilmour; Polly Samson
- Producers: Bob Ezrin; David Gilmour

Pink Floyd singles chronology
"Keep Talking" (1994)	"Lost for Words" (1994)	"Take It Back" (1994)

"Lost for Words" is a song recorded by English rock band Pink Floyd, focused on forgiveness, written by guitarist and lead singer David Gilmour and his spouse Polly Samson for the band's 14th studio album, The Division Bell. It appears as the penultimate track on the album. The lyrics, mostly penned by Samson, are a bitterly sarcastic reflection on Gilmour's then-strained relationship with former bandmate Roger Waters. The song was released to US rock radio the week of the album's release, succeeding "Keep Talking", the previous promotional release, released the week before. The song reached #53 in the Canadian singles chart.

== Track listing ==
US promotional single (CSK 6228)
No.	Title	Writer(s)	Producer(s)	Length
1.	"Lost For Words" (Clean version)	David Gilmour, Polly Samson	Bob Ezrin, Gilmour	5:14
2.	"Lost For Words" (Album version)	Gilmour, Samson	Ezrin, Gilmour	5:14

== Personnel ==
Pink Floyd

- David Gilmour – acoustic guitar, additional electric guitar, bass, lead vocals
- Richard Wright – keyboards, Hammond organ
- Nick Mason – drums, tambourine

Additional musicians:

- Jon Carin – piano, harmonium, synthesizers, fx

== Charts ==
Chart (1994)	Peak position
US Billboard Album Rock Tracks	21

== Release history ==
Region	Date	Format	Label	Catalog no.
United States	March 26, 1994	CD-R (Modern rock/Alternative radio)	Columbia Records	CSK 6228
