= What Do You Want from Me (Pink Floyd song) =

1994 song by English band

Song by Pink Floyd

from the album The Division Bell
- Released: 6 May 1994
- Recorded: 1993
- Studio: Astoria, London
- Genre: Progressive rock, blues rock
- Length: 4:21
- Label: Columbia
- Songwriters: David Gilmour; Richard Wright; Polly Samson
- Producers: Bob Ezrin; David Gilmour

"What Do You Want from Me"

Promotional single by Pink Floyd

from the album Pulse
- Released: 1995
- Recorded: 21 September 1994
- Venue: Cinecittà, Rome
- Length: 4:10
- Label: Columbia
- Producers: James Guthrie; David Gilmour

"What Do You Want from Me" is a song by Pink Floyd featured on their 1994 album, The Division Bell. Richard Wright and David Gilmour composed the music, with Gilmour and his wife Polly Samson supplying the lyrics. A live version from Pulse was released as a promotional single in Canada, reaching number 28 in the Canadian Top Singles charts.

== Song structure and lyrics ==
The song is a slow, yet rocking ballad. It has a drum roll introduction, followed by a keyboard solo and then a guitar solo. David Gilmour has agreed with an interviewer that it is a "straight Chicago blues tune", while mentioning he is still a blues fan.

In an interview, David Gilmour was asked if the song returned to the theme of alienation from the audience. He responded by saying that it "actually had more to do with personal relationships but drifted into wider territory".

== Reception ==
In a contemporary negative review for The Division Bell, Tom Graves of Rolling Stone described "What Do You Want from Me" as the only track on which "Gilmour sounds like he cares".

== Personnel ==
Pink Floyd

- David Gilmour – guitars, lead vocals
- Richard Wright – Wah wah Wurlitzer piano, Hammond organ, backing vocals
- Nick Mason – drums

Additional musicians:

- Jon Carin – synthesizers
- Guy Pratt – bass guitar
- Sam Brown – backing vocals
- Durga McBroom – backing vocals
- Carol Kenyon – backing vocals
- Jackie Sheridan – backing vocals
- Rebecca Leigh-White – backing vocals

== Releases ==
- The Division Bell, Pink Floyd (1994) – original release
- Pulse, Pink Floyd (1995) – live album
- Pulse, Pink Floyd (2006) – concert film; the song did not appear on the original VHS release (1995), but was added as a bonus feature on the DVD re-release (2006)
- Live at Pompeii, David Gilmour (2017) – live album and video recorded during Gilmour's Rattle That Lock Tour
