= Pulse (1995 film) =

1995 Pink Floyd concert video

- 2006 DVD cover
- Directed by: David Mallet
- Produced by: David Gilmour; James Guthrie; Steve O'Rourke; Lana Topham
- Starring: Pink Floyd
- Cinematography: David Mallet
- Edited by: Dave Gardener
- Music by: Pink Floyd
- Distributed by: PMI; Sony Music Video (SMV) Enterprises
- Release date: 6 June 1995 (Home video)
- Running time: 145 minutes
- Language: English

Pulse (stylised as P•U•L•S•E) is a concert video by Pink Floyd of their 20 October 1994 concert at Earls Court, London during The Division Bell Tour. It was originally released on VHS and Laserdisc in June 1995, with a DVD release coming in July 2006, with the latter release containing numerous bonus features.

In 2019, a newly restored and re-edited version was released on Blu-ray and DVD as part of The Later Years box-set; this version was given a standalone release on 18 February 2022. The Blu-ray version is the first release of Pulse in HD, although it is upconverted from the original SD video recording and remains in its 4:3 aspect ratio. A separate 90-minute edit of the film, intended for TV and streaming, was also released in 2019.

== Track listing ==
=== VHS, DVD and Blu-Ray ===
The VHS and 2019 Blu-Ray release contains the same track listing as the 2006 DVD release, but spread across just one disc/tape. Each version contains slightly different edits of the film but all are displayed in its original 4:3 aspect ratio.

Disc One

1. "Shine On You Crazy Diamond" (Parts I-V, VII)
2. "Learning to Fly"
3. "High Hopes"
4. "Take It Back"
5. "Coming Back to Life"
6. "Sorrow"
7. "Keep Talking"
8. "Another Brick in the Wall (Part 2)"
9. "One of These Days"

Disc Two: The Dark Side of the Moon and Encores

10. "Speak to Me"
11. "Breathe"
12. "On the Run"
13. "Time"
14. "The Great Gig in the Sky"
15. "Money"
16. "Us and Them"
17. "Any Colour You Like"
18. "Brain Damage"
19. "Eclipse"
20. "Wish You Were Here"
21. "Comfortably Numb"
22. "Run Like Hell"

==== 2006 DVD Special features ====
Bootlegging the Bootleggers:

1. "What Do You Want from Me"
2. "On the Turning Away"
3. "Poles Apart"
4. "Marooned"

Screen films:

1. "Shine On You Crazy Diamond"
2. "Learning to Fly"
3. "High Hopes"
4. "Speak to Me" (graphic)
5. "On the Run"
6. "Time" (1994)
7. "The Great Gig in the Sky" (wave)
8. "Money" (1987)
9. "Us and Them" (1987)
10. "Brain Damage"
11. "Eclipse"
12. Alternate versions:
  1. "Speak to Me" (1987)
  2. "Time" (Ian Eames)
  3. "Money" (Alien)
  4. "The Great Gig in the Sky" (animation)
  5. "Us and Them" (1994)

Music videos:

- "Learning to Fly"
- "Take It Back"

Behind the Scenes Footage:

- "Say Goodbye to Life as We Know It"

Other:

- Rock and Roll Hall of Fame Induction Ceremony, including "Wish You Were Here" with Billy Corgan
- Photo gallery
- Cover art
- Pulse TV advertisement (1995)
- Tour maps
- Itinerary
- Stage plans

=== Laserdisc ===
The 1995 Sony Laserdisc release featured the concert spread out over three sides of a two-disc set.

Due to space limitations, continuity, and to retain the complete performance of The Dark Side of the Moon without interruption, "Another Brick in the Wall (Part 2)" and "One of These Days" were moved to the beginning of side three.

Side One

1. "Shine On You Crazy Diamond"
2. "Learning to Fly"
3. "High Hopes"
4. "Take It Back"
5. "Coming Back to Life"
6. "Sorrow"
7. "Keep Talking"

Side Two

8. "Speak to Me"
9. "Breathe"
10. "On the Run"
11. "Time"
12. "The Great Gig in the Sky"
13. "Money"
14. "Us and Them"
15. "Any Colour You Like"
16. "Brain Damage"
17. "Eclipse"

Side Three

18. "Another Brick in the Wall (Part 2)"
19. "One of These Days"
20. "Wish You Were Here"
21. "Comfortably Numb"
22. "Run Like Hell"

=== 2019 90-minute version ===
Coinciding with the 2019 remaster, a new shorter version of the concert for streaming and broadcasting was made, based on the 2019 Blu-ray/DVD version. The release omitted and reordered many songs compared to previous releases, but still contained the full performance of The Dark Side of the Moon.

1. "Speak to Me"
2. "Breathe"
3. "On the Run"
4. "Time"
5. "The Great Gig in the Sky"
6. "Money"
7. "Us and Them"
8. "Any Colour You Like"
9. "Brain Damage"
10. "Eclipse"
11. "Sorrow"
12. "Keep Talking"
13. "High Hopes"
14. "Wish You Were Here"
15. "Comfortably Numb"

== Personnel ==
Pink Floyd

- David Gilmour – lead vocals, guitars, console steel guitar, talk box
- Nick Mason – drums, gong, roto-toms
- Richard Wright – keyboards, backing vocals, co-lead vocals on "Time" and "Comfortably Numb" (verses)

Additional personnel

- Guy Pratt – bass guitar, backing vocals, co-lead vocals on "Comfortably Numb" (verses) and "Run Like Hell"
- Jon Carin – keyboards, programming, backing vocals, co-lead vocals on "Comfortably Numb" (verses)
- Sam Brown – backing vocals, first lead vocalist on "The Great Gig in the Sky"
- Durga McBroom – backing vocals, second lead vocalist on "The Great Gig in the Sky"
- Claudia Fontaine – backing vocals, third lead vocalist on "The Great Gig in the Sky"
- Tim Renwick – guitars, backing vocals
- Dick Parry – saxophones
- Gary Wallis – percussion, additional drums (played and programmed)

== Editing out the Publius Enigma ==
The 2006 DVD release saw some re-edited footage of the original 1995 release. During The Division Bell Tour the word(s) "Enigma" or "Publius Enigma" would be visible on part of the stage (sometimes it would be written in lights, or on the back screen). These were connected to the Enigma competition surrounding the album and tour. On 20 October 1994, during "Another Brick in the Wall (Part 2)" the screen displayed the word "Enigma" instead of "E=MC^{2}" which is what was shown at all other shows, as seen on the original 1995 release. The DVD, however, has an altered back-drop displaying "E=MC^{2}", although if the DVD is paused at the correct moment the word "Enigma" is still visible. This portion has been replaced with band members shots on the 2019 Blu-ray version.

== Charts and certifications ==
=== Weekly charts ===
| Chart (1995) | Peak position |
|---|---|
| UK Music DVD (OCC) | 2 |
| UK Video (OCC) | 6 |
| US Music Video Sales (Billboard) | 1 |
| Chart (2006) | Peak position |
| Australian Music DVDs (ARIA) | 1 |
| Austrian Music DVD (Ö3 Austria) | 1 |
| Belgian Music DVD (Ultratop Flanders) | 1 |
| Belgian Music DVD (Ultratop Wallonia) | 1 |
| Danish Music DVD (Tracklisten) | 1 |
| Dutch Music DVD (MegaCharts) | 1 |
| French Music DVD | 1 |
| Italian Albums (FIMI) | 7 |
| Italian Music DVD (FIMI) | 1 |
| Spanish Music DVD (Promusicae) | 1 |
| Swiss Albums (Schweizer Hitparade) | 5 |
| UK Music DVD (OCC) | 1 |
| UK Video (OCC) | 2 |
| US Music Video Sales (Billboard) | 1 |
| Chart (2009) | Peak position |
| Swiss Music DVD (Schweizer Hitparade) | 7 |

=== Year-end charts ===
| Chart (2006) | Position |
|---|---|
| Swiss Albums (Schweizer Hitparade) | 89 |

=== Certifications ===
| Region | Certification | Certified units/sales |
|---|---|---|
| Australia (ARIA) | 14× Platinum | 210,000^{^} |
| Austria (IFPI Austria) | Platinum | 10,000^{*} |
| Brazil (Pro-Música Brasil) | Diamond | 125,000^{*} |
| Canada (Music Canada) | 2× Platinum | 20,000^{^} |
| Denmark (IFPI Danmark) | Gold | 20,000^{^} |
| Finland (Musiikkituottajat) | Platinum | 13,965 |
| France (SNEP) | Diamond | 100,000^{*} |
| Germany (BVMI) | 7× Gold | 175,000^{^} |
| New Zealand (RMNZ) | 12× Platinum | 60,000^{^} |
| Poland (ZPAV) | 3× Platinum | 30,000^{*} |
| Portugal (AFP) | 4× Platinum | 32,000^{^} |
| Spain (Promusicae) | 2× Platinum | 50,000^{^} |
| Switzerland (IFPI Switzerland) | 3× Platinum | 18,000^{^} |
| United Kingdom (BPI) | 5× Platinum | 250,000^{*} |
| United States (RIAA) | 8× Platinum | 800,000^{^} |
^{*} Sales figures based on certification alone.^{^} Shipments figures based on certification alone.
