= Sorrow (Pink Floyd song) =

Song by Pink Floyd

from the album A Momentary Lapse of Reason
- Released: 7 September 1987
- Recorded: 1987
- Genre: Progressive rock
- Length: 8:48
- Label: EMI (UK); Columbia (US)
- Songwriter: David Gilmour
- Producers: Bob Ezrin; David Gilmour

Audio
- "Sorrow" on YouTube

"Sorrow" is a song by the English rock band Pink Floyd. Written by the band's singer and guitarist David Gilmour, it is the closing track on their thirteenth studio album, A Momentary Lapse of Reason, released in 1987.

== Lyrics and music ==
The piece was written and composed by singer and guitarist David Gilmour. He has stated that although words are not his strong point, the song is one of his best lyrical efforts, even as the opening line was appropriated from John Steinbeck's The Grapes of Wrath.

Sorrow was a poem I'd written as a lyric before I wrote music to it, which is rare for me.

— David Gilmour

Drummer Nick Mason has since stated that the song was almost entirely written by Gilmour over the space of a weekend on his houseboat Astoria. When Mason returned from the weekend, only "some spit and polish", according to Mason, was needed. Gilmour has also mentioned that his solo at the end of "Sorrow" was done on the boat, his guitar going through a small Gallien-Krueger amplifier. As on many tracks from the album, Gilmour played a Steinberger GL "headless" guitar on this song. The guitar intro was recorded inside Los Angeles Memorial Sports Arena and piped through Pink Floyd's large sound system, yielding an extremely deep, cavernous sound. The drum machine on the song was programmed by Gilmour – no real drums were used on the original version. Mason recorded a new drum track for the album's 2019 remix.

== Reception ==
Critic Mike Cormack said the song is "the great set piece of the album, but it is cold, synthetic, and tries too hard to convince you of its own greatness. It’s a cocaine song." The song peaked at No. 36 on the U.S. Mainstream Rock chart, despite not being released as a single.

== Live versions ==
The song was performed on the A Momentary Lapse of Reason Tour and the Division Bell Tour. Recordings of those performances are featured on its respective live albums, Delicate Sound of Thunder (1988) and Pulse (1995), with running times of 9:27 and 10:49 respectively, mostly taken up by extended guitar solos by Gilmour and an additional outro. A slightly shortened version of the song appears on Pink Floyd's greatest hits collection, Echoes: The Best of Pink Floyd, which is edited so that the song "Sheep" (also edited) segues into "Sorrow". David Gilmour played the song at the Strat Pack guitar concert, an event which commemorated the 50th anniversary of the Fender Stratocaster. Gilmour played the song on the second set of his Rattle That Lock Tour 2015/16.. He also included the song as part of his 2024 Luck and Strange Tour, where it opened the second set of the show. The song was also performed in 1990 during the band's set at Knebworth for the Silver Clef Award Winners Concert. For many years, an official release of this performance was unavailable, but the 2019 boxset The Later Years included it as part of the complete set list on both Blu-Ray/DVD and CD.

== Personnel on studio version ==
Pink Floyd

- David Gilmour – lead and backing vocals, electric guitar, keyboards, electronic drum kit (original mix), programming
- Nick Mason – drums (2019 remix)

Additional musicians

- Richard Wright – Kurzweil synthesiser
- Bob Ezrin – keyboards
- Tony Levin – bass guitar
- Darlene Koldenhoven – backing vocals
- Carmen Twillie – backing vocals
- Phyllis St. James – backing vocals
- Donny Gerrard – backing vocals

== Personnel on live versions ==
=== Delicate Sound of Thunder and Pulse ===
Pink Floyd

- David Gilmour – lead vocals, lead guitar
- Nick Mason – drums
- Richard Wright – keyboards, backing vocals

Additional musicians

- Guy Pratt – bass guitar
- Jon Carin – keyboards, backing vocals, programming
- Tim Renwick – rhythm guitar
- Gary Wallis – percussion, drums
- Durga McBroom – backing vocals (Delicate Sound of Thunder and Pulse)
- Rachel Fury – backing vocals (Delicate Sound of Thunder)
- Margaret Taylor – backing vocals (Delicate Sound of Thunder)
- Sam Brown – backing vocals (Pulse)
- Claudia Fontaine – backing vocals (Pulse)

=== Live at Pompeii ===
- David Gilmour – lead vocals, lead guitar
- Steve DiStanislao – drums
- Chester Kamen – guitar, backing vocals
- Guy Pratt – bass, backing vocals
- Greg Phillinganes – keyboards, backing vocals
- Chuck Leavell – keyboards, backing vocals
- Brian Chambers – backing vocals
- Lucita Jules – backing vocals
- Louise Clare Marshall – backing vocals

=== The Luck and Strange Concerts ===
- David Gilmour – lead vocals, lead electric guitar
- Ben Worsley – backing vocals, electric guitar
- Greg Phillinganes – piano
- Rob Gentry – keyboards
- Guy Pratt – bass guitar
- Adam Betts – drums
- Louise Clare Marshall – backing vocals
- Charley Webb – backing vocals
- Hattie Webb – backing vocals
- Damon Iddins – sound effects
