= One of These Days (instrumental) =

1971 song by Pink Floyd

- Italian vinyl single

Single by Pink Floyd

from the album Meddle
- B-side: "Fearless"
- Released: 29 November 1971 (US)
- Recorded: 15 March – 22 July 1971
- Studio: AIR, Abbey Road, and Morgan (London)
- Genre: Progressive rock; experimental rock; hard rock; drone rock
- Length: 5:57 (album version); 5:50 (Works version); 5:15 (Echoes version)
- Label: Harvest; Capitol
- Songwriters: David Gilmour; Roger Waters; Richard Wright; Nick Mason
- Producer: Pink Floyd

Pink Floyd singles chronology
"The Nile Song" (1969)	"One of These Days" (1971)	"Free Four" (1972)

Audio video
- "One of These Days" on YouTube

"One of These Days" is the opening track from Pink Floyd's 1971 album Meddle. The composition is instrumental except for the spoken line from drummer Nick Mason, "One of these days, I'm going to cut you into little pieces." It features double-tracked bass guitars played by David Gilmour and Roger Waters.

== Music ==
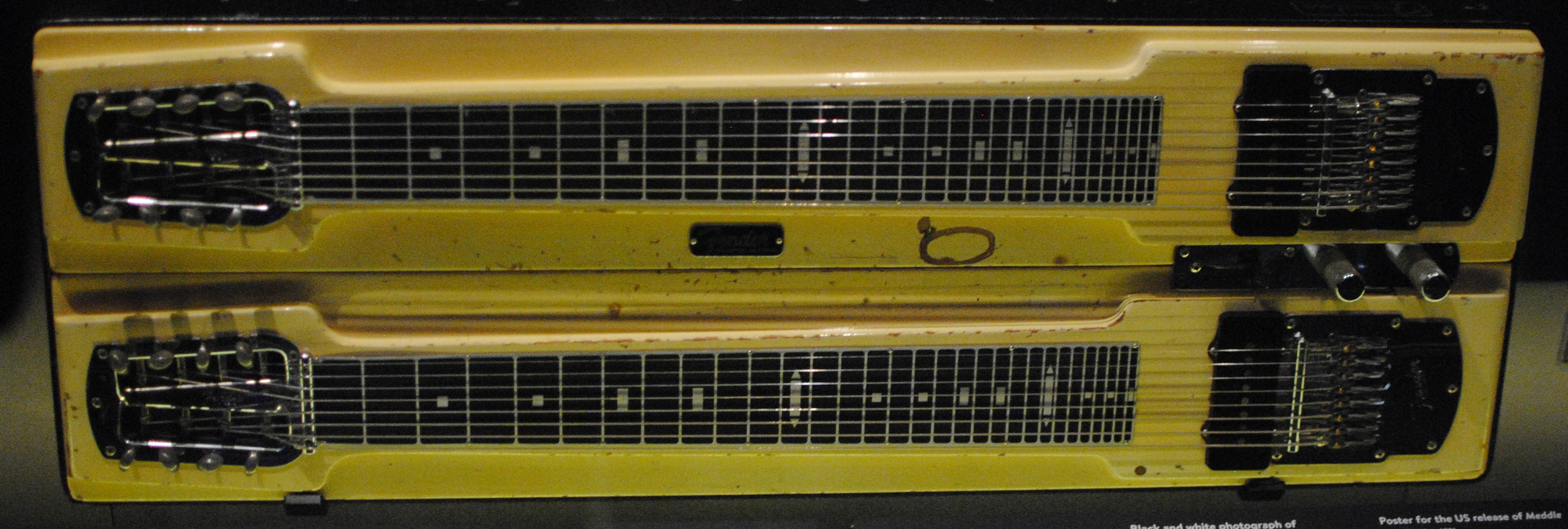
Fender Duo 1000 double-neck steel guitar (1962), purchased in Seattle in October 1970 by David Gilmour, and used on "One of These Days"; displayed at the Pink Floyd: Their Mortal Remains exhibition

The predominant element of the piece is that of a bass guitar played through a delay (Binson Echorec) unit, set to produce repeats in quarter-note triplets. The result of this setting is: that if the player plays simple quarter notes, the added echoes will produce a pattern of quarter note – eighth note, quarter note – eighth note. Pink Floyd would again use this technique on the bass line for "Sheep". This riff was first created by David Gilmour on guitar with effects, then Roger Waters had the idea of using bass instead of guitar, so they recorded the song on two different bass guitars.

Each bass part is hard panned into one channel of stereo, but one bass sound is quite muted and dull. According to Gilmour, this is because that particular instrument had old strings on it, and the roadie they had sent to get new strings for it wandered off to see his girlfriend instead.

The piece is in B minor, occasionally alternating with an A major chord.

The distinctive keyboard accents on this track are composed of three components: A Hammond organ forms the 'fade in', followed by a "Stab" composed of a second Hammond organ with percussion stop, overdubbed with an acoustic piano fed through a Leslie speaker, as was also used on "Echoes". For live versions, the 'fade in' part was played on a Farfisa organ.

The threatening lyric, a rare vocal contribution by Nick Mason, was recorded through a ring modulator and slowed down to create an eerie effect. It was aimed at Sir Jimmy Young, the then BBC Radio 1 and Radio 2 DJ who the band supposedly disliked because he tended to babble. During early 1970s concerts, they sometimes played a sound collage of clips from Young's radio show that was edited to sound completely nonsensical, thus figuratively "cutting him into little pieces".

Possibly the most interesting thing about "One of These Days" is that it actually stars myself as vocalist, for the first time on any of our records that actually got to the public. It's a rather startling performance involving the use of a high voice and slowed down tape.

— Nick Mason

According to John Peel, Waters described "One of These Days" as a "poignant appraisal of the contemporary social situation". Gilmour said it was the most collaborative piece ever produced by the group.

A film, French Windows, was made by Ian Emes, set to the piece and featuring people and gibbons dancing against various backgrounds. After being seen on television by the band, it was back-projected by Pink Floyd during live performances and Emes was commissioned to make further films for the band.

The tune also quotes Delia Derbyshire's realisation of Ron Grainer's Doctor Who theme music from the British science fiction television series Doctor Who. This quotation is most clear in live performances.

Part of the song was used on the Soviet television program "Mezhdunarodnaya Panorama" ("International Panorama"). The playing of the track in the program is also discussed in Victor Pelevin's 1992 novel Omon Ra.

The bass riff influenced Brian Eno's song "Third Uncle" from the album Taking Tiger Mountain (By Strategy). Depeche Mode cites "One of These Days" as a direct influence on their song "Clean" from their album Violator (1990).

== Live performances ==
Pink Floyd first performed the song live for a BBC Radio 1 session at the Paris Cinema on 30 September 1971. It was then a regular part of the group's setlist, beginning with a US tour promoting Meddle. A performance at the Amphitheatre of Pompeii in October was featured on the film Pink Floyd: Live at Pompeii, where it was given the title "One of These Days I'm Going to Cut You into Little Pieces". It was one of four pieces performed as an accompaniment to Roland Petit's ballet featuring the group's music. From 1973 onwards, it became an encore. The last performance with Waters was on 26 June 1974 at the Palais des Sports, Paris.

The song was resurrected for the group's 1987–1989 A Momentary Lapse of Reason & Another Lapse Tours, where it became the opening number of the second set. For 1994's The Division Bell Tour, it featured as the last show in the first set. This arrangement featured David Gilmour on lap steel guitar, Tim Renwick on rhythm guitar, Guy Pratt on bass, Richard Wright and Jon Carin on keyboards, with Nick Mason and Gary Wallis on drums and percussion. Live performances from this era are included on the Delicate Sound of Thunder video (1989), CD, LP, and cassette (1988) and the Pulse album (1995) (cassette & LP only) & video, DVD and blu-ray (1995/2006/2019 respectively). It is absent from the iTunes version of the Pulse album. A live version was also included on the B-side of the "High Hopes/Keep Talking" double A-side single (1994).

On 25 June 2016, David Gilmour and his solo band performed the song during their set at the Plac Wolności in Wrocław, Poland, the first time Gilmour had played it live in more than 20 years and the first time he'd ever made it part of a solo set list. Gilmour also performed the song during his concerts at the Amphitheatre of Pompeii on 7 and 8 July 2016. This performance was released as part of his Live at Pompeii live album and was chosen to be the second single to promote the release. These concerts made "One of These Days" the only song played at Pink Floyd's 1971 performance and Gilmour's 2016 performance. Roger Waters played the piece in the first set of songs on his 2017 Us + Them Tour. The song also features in Nick Mason's Saucerful of Secrets live shows, again featuring Guy Pratt on bass. A recording is included on their 2020 live album Live at the Roundhouse.

A live version was released in 2016 on The Early Years 1965–1972, Volume 5: 1971: Reverber/ation, from a BBC Radio session on 30 September 1971.

== Reception ==
In a review for the Meddle album, Jean-Charles Costa of Rolling Stone described "One of These Days" as sticking to the usual Pink Floyd formula, but "each segment of the tune is so well done, and the whole thing coheres so perfectly that it comes across as a positive, high-energy opening." Critic Mike Cormack describes the song as "a magnificent sonic wash, with the pulsating bass lines (played by both Waters and Gilmour, through the Binson Echorec), Gilmour’s slide guitar, the colorful organ work by Wright and his wonderful spacey bing! motif all cohering into wildly exciting waves of sound."

== Personnel ==
Pink Floyd

=== Meddle ===
- David Gilmour – electric and slide guitars, bass guitar (double-tracked)
- Roger Waters – bass guitar (double-tracked)
- Nick Mason – drums, vocal phrase
- Richard Wright – Hammond organ, piano

=== Delicate Sound of Thunder and Pulse ===
- David Gilmour – console steel guitar
- Nick Mason – drums, percussion, vocal phrase (recording)
- Richard Wright – Hammond organ, synthesiser
- Guy Pratt – bass guitar
- Gary Wallis – percussion, drums
- Tim Renwick – rhythm guitar
- Jon Carin – synthesiser, programming

=== Pink Floyd: Live at Pompeii ===
- David Gilmour – slide guitar
- Roger Waters – bass, gong
- Richard Wright – Hammond organ, piano, EMS VCS 3
- Nick Mason – drums

Solo

=== Live at Pompeii (David Gilmour) ===
- David Gilmour – console steel guitar, cymbals
- Chester Kamen – electric guitars
- Guy Pratt – bass
- Greg Phillinganes – piano
- Chuck Leavell – organ
- Steve DiStanislao – drums, aeoliphone

=== "Roger Waters: Us + Them" ===
- Roger Waters – bass
- David Kilminster – lead electric guitar
- Gus Seyffert – bass
- Jon Carin – lap steel guitar
- Jonathan Wilson – electric guitar
- Bo Koster – keyboards
- Joey Waronker – drums, percussion
- Jess Wolfe – percussion, choreography
- Holly Laessig – percussion, choreography

=== "Live at the Roundhouse (Nick Mason's Saucerful of Secrets)" ===
- Nick Mason – drums, percussion
- Dom Beken – keyboards
- Guy Pratt – bass
- Gary Kemp – electric guitar
- Lee Harris – lap steel guitar

== 1989 promo video ==
A promo video was used to promote Delicate Sound of Thunder and got brief airing on MTV in 1989. It showed the band performing the track on stage at Nassau Coliseum and shots of the inflatable pig that flew over the audience during the song in the show. The end of the clip blacks out instead of segueing into "Time" as on the Delicate Sound of Thunder video.
