= Andy Jackson (sound engineer) =

British recording engineer

- Born: Andrew Brook Jackson
- Origin: United Kingdom
- Genres: Progressive rock
- Occupation: Recording engineer

Andrew Brook Jackson is a British recording engineer, best known for his work with the British progressive rock band Pink Floyd. He was (until 2022) also the owner and operator of Tube Mastering, a private studio specializing in recorded music mastering.

== Career ==
Originally trained in the profession at Utopia Studios, Jackson began work as an engineer for Pink Floyd in 1980, assisting in the recording of the performances of The Wall at Earls Court. He then worked on the film soundtrack recordings for Pink Floyd – The Wall and the studio album The Final Cut. Jackson became the band's primary engineer beginning with A Momentary Lapse of Reason and then The Division Bell plus the material recorded for the soundtrack to the band's 1992 auto racing documentary film La Carrera Panamericana. He was also the Front of House engineer on the band's 1994 world tour. He was producer of Pink Floyd's final studio album The Endless River. His current primary responsibility is as the Senior Engineer for David Gilmour's studios, Astoria and Medina, and has worked on all of Gilmour's recordings/multimedia projects as an engineer and/or co-producer since 1984. He was also the engineer on Roger Waters' first solo album, The Pros and Cons of Hitch Hiking, and worked Front of House on Waters' 1984 tour.

Jackson (in collaboration with engineer Damon Iddins) has remastered the majority of the bonus features material on the Immersion editions of The Dark Side of the Moon and Wish You Were Here for the Why Pink Floyd...? reissue campaign, and the 2016 box set The Early Years 1965–1972.

In addition to his work with Pink Floyd, Jackson has also worked with artists such as Heatwave, Strawbs, The Boomtown Rats (most notably mixed their hit "I Don't Like Mondays") and goth rock group Fields of the Nephilim. He also created his own record label, Tube Records and performed on the album Obvious, which was released in 2000. He was also a guitar player in the live band version of The Eden House for four years. His first solo album Signal to Noise was released in 2014, followed by 73 Days at Sea in 2016 and Twelve Half Steps in 2023.

Very recently he closed his company, Tube Mastering. A fourth solo album, AI AJ was released in March 2024. Andy Jackson's website

== Awards ==
- Grammy nomination for Best Engineered Recording - Non-Classical, Pink Floyd’s A Momentary Lapse of Reason, 1988.
- Grammy nomination for Best Engineered Album - Non-Classical, Pink Floyd’s The Division Bell, 1995.
- Grammy nomination for Best Surround Sound Album, Pink Floyd’s The Division Bell, 2014.

== Discography ==
=== Albums ===
- Obvious – (2000) CD, Tube Records
- Signal To Noise – (2014) CD & CD/DVD, Esoteric Antenna
- 73 Days At Sea – (2016) CD/DVD, Esoteric Antenna
- Twelve Half Steps - (2023), CD/BD, Esoteric Antenna
- AI AJ - (2024), CD/BD, Esoteric Antenna
