= Poles Apart =

Song by Pink Floyd

from the album The Division Bell
- Released: 28 March 1994
- Recorded: 1993
- Length: 7:04
- Label: EMI (UK); Columbia (US)
- Songwriters: David Gilmour; Polly Samson; Nick Laird-Clowes
- Producers: Bob Ezrin; David Gilmour

"Poles Apart" is a song by Pink Floyd from the band's 1994 album, The Division Bell.

== Lyrics ==
The lyrics speak to ex-bandmembers Syd Barrett in the first verse, and Roger Waters in the second, according to co-writer Polly Samson. As such, the second verse begins with the words "Hey you", the title of a Waters-penned song from Pink Floyd's earlier album, The Wall.

== Tuning ==
The song was performed in DADGAD tuning.

[about the D,A,D,G,A,D tuning on "Poles Apart", a new tuning for David Gilmour] (...) the funny thing is that I didn't know it was such an established tuning -- I thought it was something new that I had invented. One day, I was on holiday in Greece and I had an acoustic guitar with me. I just decided to tune the bottom string down to D, and continued to experiment until I arrived at that tuning. Then I mucked around a bit and "Poles Apart" fell out of it a few minutes later.

— David Gilmour, 1994

== Personnel ==
- David Gilmour – acoustic & electric guitars, lap steel, fretless bass, lead vocals, keyboards, programming
- Nick Mason – drums and percussion
- Richard Wright – Hammond organ

Additional musicians:

- Tim Renwick – acoustic guitar
- Jon Carin – keyboards, fx
