= Marooned (instrumental) =

Instrumental by Pink Floyd

from the album The Division Bell
- Released: 28 March 1994
- Recorded: 1993
- Genre: Progressive rock; instrumental rock; new age
- Length: 5:28; 2:02 (Echoes version)
- Label: EMI (UK); Columbia (US)
- Songwriters: David Gilmour; Richard Wright
- Producers: Bob Ezrin; David Gilmour

Music video
- "Pink Floyd - Marooned (Official Video)" on YouTube

"Marooned" is an instrumental track on Pink Floyd's 1994 album, The Division Bell. It is the only Pink Floyd track ever to win a Grammy Award.

== Writing and recording ==
The piece was written by Richard Wright and David Gilmour. It has sounds that describe the setting as an island, such as the sounds of seagulls and waves crashing on the shore. It was composed while jamming aboard the Astoria in early 1993. Gilmour processed the guitar sound with a DigiTech Whammy pedal to pitch-shift notes entire octaves. Also in the background can be heard wailing guitar effects by Gilmour, reminiscent of the song "Echoes". Wright's grand piano parts (originally played and recorded on a Kurzweil) were recorded at Olympic Studios in London.

David Gilmour has mentioned that "pretty much" all of "Marooned" is improvised and that he "probably took three or four passes at it and took the best bits out of each". Wright also said this was the first song to be mixed for The Division Bell in an interview with In the Studio host Redbeard.

== Reception ==
Stereogum opined that the instrumental "stands out primarily as a song that sounds as much like Pink Floyd as anything on their mid-'70s releases. The song roots itself to Gilmour's familiar lonesome melodic guitar descants threading themselves through the trademark mood setting and foundation of Mason's drum work and the invaluable Wright's keyboard deviations." Contrastingly, Vulture wrote that "[m]arooned is how you feel listening to this pallid, five-minute-and-thirty-second guitar solo."

The instrumental won the Grammy Award for Best Rock Instrumental Performance at the 37th Annual Grammy Awards in 1995.

== Live and other releases ==
This song had only been played live three times before 2024: On the two dates in Oslo, Norway (one of which is featured in the bonus features on the Pulse DVD) on the 1994 "The Division Bell" tour and at "The Strat Pack" charity concert, for the 50th anniversary of the Fender Stratocaster guitar, where Gilmour played his "#0001" Stratocaster. In 2024, David Gilmour played it as a part of his Luck and Strange tour.

An excerpt of the music is featured on Echoes: The Best of Pink Floyd.

In 2014, for the twentieth anniversary of the original release of The Division Bell, a music video for the song was produced and released on the official Pink Floyd website as well as the anniversary box set of the album. Aubrey Powell of Hipgnosis directed the video, filming some parts in the abandoned city of Pripyat, Ukraine during the first week of April 2014 and on the International Space Station.

On 28 July 2021, to mark Wright's birthday, Pink Floyd published the track's 8 minute 22 second "original demo" on YouTube. It features Wright, Gilmour, Nick Mason and Guy Pratt "jamming direct to a stereo DAT machine at Britannia Row Studios".

== Personnel ==
- David Gilmour – guitars
- Richard Wright – piano, organ and Kurzweil synthesizer
- Nick Mason – drums

Additional musicians

- Jon Carin - programming and additional keyboards
- Guy Pratt – bass guitar
