= Tim de Paravicini =

English electronic engineer (1945–2020)

- Born: 25 October 1945; Nigeria
- Died: 17 December 2020 (aged 75); Japan
- Occupations: Electronics Engineer and founder of EAR Yoshino

Baron Timothy de Paravicini (25 October 1945 – 17 December 2020) was an English electronics engineer and designer.

== Biography ==
He was brought to England for his education, which culminated in his receiving a degree in electrical engineering. After finishing his degree, he moved to Johannesburg (South Africa). He worked there as a consultant to hi-fi stores, ran a factory building transformers and amplifiers, built PA systems for rock groups and worked for recording studios.
He moved to Japan at the end of 1972 to work as an engineer for Luxman. He developed (among other components) the Luxman C1000 preamp, the M4000 and M6000 power amplifiers, and the MQ-3600 tube power amplifier.

In 1977, he moved back to the UK and founded EAR Yoshino (EAR for Esoteric Audio Research). He consulted for a number of Hi-Fi Manufacturers that include Musical Fidelity and Quad.

He had involvement with the professional recording industry, designing custom equipment and consulted on sound engineering for Astoria studio, Paul Epworth's Church Studio and Mobile Fidelity's mastering studio.

He died of liver cancer.
