= Publius Enigma =

Internet phenomenon

The Publius Enigma is an Internet phenomenon and an unsolved problem that began with cryptic messages posted by a user identifying only as "Publius" to the unmoderated Usenet newsgroup alt.music.pink-floyd through the Penet remailer, a now defunct anonymous information exchange service. The messenger proposed a riddle in connection with the 1994 Pink Floyd album The Division Bell, promising that the answer would lead to a reward. It remains unclear if the enigma involves a genuinely solvable puzzle as part of an early Internet-based contest or was a convoluted hoax.

== History ==
During the 1994 Division Bell World Tour, Columbia Records flew a 194-foot-long (59 m) airship named The Division Belle between Pink Floyd concert locations. The Columbia Electronic Press Kit was released to the media, along with the Promo Spots Video consisting of interviews with band members, footage of the airship in action, and a segment which contained the following:

"A spokesperson for Pink Floyd has issued the following statement: You have spotted the Pink Floyd Airship. Do not be alarmed. Pink Floyd have sent their airship to North America to deliver a message. The Pink Floyd Airship is headed towards a destination where all will be explained upon arrival. Pink Floyd will communicate."

On 11 June 1994, a user calling themselves "Publius" began posting messages to a Pink Floyd newsgroup inviting fans to scrutinize the album artwork, lyrics, and music on The Division Bell, and hinted at a puzzle or riddle to solve leading to a prize.

One such post clarified the challenge:

AS SOME OF YOU HAVE SUSPECTED, "The Division Bell" is not like its
predecessors. Although all great music is subject to multiple
interpretations, in this case there is a central purpose and a
designed solution. For the ingenious person (or group of persons)
who recognizes this - and where this information points to - a
unique prize has been secreted.

    How and Where?
    The Division Bell
    Listen again
    Look again
    As your thoughts will steer you
    Leading the blind while I stared out the steel
      in your eyes.
    Lyrics, artwork and music will take you there

Later, on 16 July 1994, Publius promised a clue would appear in "flashing white lights". On the night of 18 July 1994, patterns in the lights on the front of the stage at the Pink Floyd concert in East Rutherford momentarily spelled out the words ENIGMA PUBLIUS.

In September 1996, the Penet remailer service was shut down and posts to the newsgroup through the associated Publius account ceased.

== Official statements ==
In 2002, guitarist David Gilmour said the Publius Enigma was "some silly record company thing that they thought up to puzzle people with". In April 2005, during a book signing of his biographical work Inside Out: A Personal History of Pink Floyd, drummer Nick Mason affirmed that it had been instigated by the record company:

That was a ploy done by EMI. They had a man working for them who adored puzzles. He used to work for the Reagan administration. His job then would be to be in meetings with the president and when Reagan would say "Let's bomb these people" he would say "That's not a good idea sir!". He was working for EMI and suggested that a puzzle be created that could be followed on the Web. The prize was never given out. To this day it remains unresolved. The prize was something like a crop of trees planted in a clear cut area of forest or something to that effect. It was not to be a prize of some tangible thing but rather a touchy-feely sort of gift that was more of a philanthropic thing than something you could hang on the wall.

Pink Floyd's lighting and production designer, Marc Brickman, stated that Steve O'Rourke had asked him to arrange the stage lighting to spell out the aforementioned ENIGMA PUBLIUS.
