= Take It Back =

Single by Pink Floyd

from the album The Division Bell
- B-side: 2-track; "Astronomy Domine" (Live); 3-track; "Astronomy Domine" (Live); "Take It Back" (Edit)
- Released: 23 May 1994
- Recorded: 1993
- Genre: Progressive rock
- Length: 6:13 (album version); 4:55 (single edit); 7:07 (extended version on French promo single)
- Label: EMI (UK); Columbia (US)
- Songwriters: David Gilmour; Bob Ezrin; Polly Samson; Nick Laird-Clowes
- Producers: Bob Ezrin; David Gilmour

Pink Floyd singles chronology
"Lost for Words" (1994)	"Take It Back" (1994)	"High Hopes" (1994)

Music video
- "Pink Floyd - Take It Back (Official Music Video HD)" on YouTube

"Take It Back" is a song by the English progressive rock band Pink Floyd, released as the seventh track on their fourteenth album, The Division Bell (1994). It was also released as a single on 23 May 1994, by EMI (UK) and Columbia (US), the first from the album, and Pink Floyd's first for seven years. The single peaked at number 23 on the UK Singles Chart, the fourth highest in the band's history, below 1979 number 1 hit "Another Brick In The Wall" and 1967 top 20 hits "See Emily Play" and "Arnold Layne". The music for the song was written by guitarist David Gilmour and album co-producer Bob Ezrin, with lyrics by Gilmour, his wife Polly Samson and Nick Laird-Clowes. Its accompanying music video was nominated for Best Clip of the Year in the category for Rock at the 1994 Billboard Music Video Awards.

== Lyrics ==
The lyrics were written through the point of view of a dysfunctional relationship, used as an allegory for how humans treat the planet.

During its instrumental section, a barely audible rendition of the nursery rhyme "Ring a Ring o' Roses" can be heard.

== Equipment ==
Guitarist David Gilmour used an E-bow on a Gibson J-200 acoustic guitar that is processed through a Zoom effects box, then directly injected into the board.

== Personnel ==
- David Gilmour – lead vocals, guitar, Ebow
- Richard Wright – keyboards, Hammond and Farfisa organs
- Nick Mason – drums, percussion

Additional musicians:

- Tim Renwick – additional guitar
- Jon Carin – Synthesizers, keyboards, loops
- Guy Pratt – bass
- Bob Ezrin – keyboards, percussion
- Sam Brown – backing vocals
- Durga McBroom – backing vocals
- Carol Kenyon – backing vocals
- Jackie Sheridan – backing vocals
- Rebecca Leigh-White – backing vocals

== Charts ==
=== Weekly charts ===
Chart (1994)	Peak position
Australia (ARIA)	64
Belgium (Ultratop 50 Flanders)	43
Canada Retail Singles (The Record)	8
Canada Top Singles (RPM)	9
Europe (European Hit Radio)	16
France (SNEP)	50
Germany (GfK)	75
Iceland (Íslenski Listinn Topp 40)	19
Netherlands (Single Top 100)	23
New Zealand (Recorded Music NZ)	7
UK Singles (Official Charts)	23
UK Airplay (Music Week)	28
US Billboard Hot 100	73
US Mainstream Rock (Billboard)	4
US Cash Box Top 100	65

=== Year-end charts ===
Chart (1994)	Position
Canada Top Singles (RPM)	71
US Album Rock Tracks (Billboard)	23
