= Claudia Fontaine =

British singer (1960–2018)

Claudia Fontaine (26 August 1960 – 13 March 2018) was a backing vocalist from Peckham in south-east London.

== Career ==
During the 1980s, Fontaine and fellow backing vocalist Caron Wheeler (and later, third member Naomi Thompson) were known as Afrodiziak. She made an appearance in the video "Back to Life (However Do You Want Me)" with Soul II Soul.

She joined a number of lovers rock trios, including Mellow Rose, One Love, and True Harmony, then emerged as a soloist. In 1981, she sang a hit single, "Natural High".

She also performed with such artists as The Jam, Natasha Bedingfield, Sam Brown, B.B King, Alfie Boe, Chaka Demus & Pliers, Eric Clapton, Eurythmics, Jools Holland, Heaven 17, Geri Halliwell, Tom Jones, Chaka Khan, Janet Kay, Kylie Minogue, Paul Weller, Elvis Costello and The Attractions, Marilyn, Madness, Neneh Cherry, The Specials, Heaven 17, Hothouse Flowers and Howard Jones. Fontaine sang background vocals on the hit single "Free Nelson Mandela" by The Special AKA. Fontaine was the lead vocalist on The Beatmasters' 1989 hit single, "Warm Love", which is included on their debut album Anywayawanna.

She also sang lead vocals on the song "Deeper into Harmony" on The Beatmasters' 1992 album Life & Soul. She performed backing vocals on Pink Floyd's The Division Bell Tour and the subsequent DVD and CD Pulse. She also toured with Robbie Williams, Toploader, Pink Floyd, Chaka Khan, Eurythmics, U2 & Hothouse Flowers. She sang at many festivals including Reading, Glastonbury, Live Aid, Comic Relief & SunflowerJam. Her voice can also be heard on the charity single, "Help For Heroes". She sang by royal appointment for the Royal Family at the Party at the Palace concert in 2002, in Buckingham Palace, London.

== Death ==
Fontaine died on 13 March 2018, aged 57.

== Filmography ==
- Pulse (1994)
- Showgirls (1995)
- Peacetour (2000)
- David Gilmour in Concert (2002)
- Alfie (2004)

== Discography ==
- "Beat Surrender" (single) – The Jam (1982)
- Punch the Clock – Elvis Costello & the Attractions (1983)
- Battle Hymns For Children Singing – Haysi Fantayzee (1983)
- In the Studio – The Specials (1984)
- How Men Are – Heaven 17 (1984)
- Dream into Action – Howard Jones (1985)
- Despite Straight Lines – Marilyn (1985)
- People – Hothouse Flowers (1988)
- "Warm Love" (single) – Beatmasters (1989)
- Bonafide – Maxi Priest (1990)
- Love: And a Million Other Things – Claudia Brücken (1991)
- Mothers Heaven – Texas (1991)
- Schubert Dip – EMF (1991)
- Play – Squeeze (1991)
- Flowered Up – Weekender (1992)
- "Deeper into Harmony" – Beatmasters (1992)
- "Can't Do Both" – Tim Finn (1993)
- Funky Little Demons – The Wolfgang Press (1994)
- Pulse – Pink Floyd (1995)
- Frestonia – Aztec Camera (1995)
- Across from Midnight – Joe Cocker (1997)
- Box (choir) - Sam Brown (1997)
- ReBoot – Sam Brown (2000)
- Jealous God – Nathan Larson (2001)
- Studio 150 - Paul Weller (2004)
