= Astoria (houseboat) =

Houseboat on the River Thames, London

Coordinates: 51°24′42.91″N 0°21′29.16″W

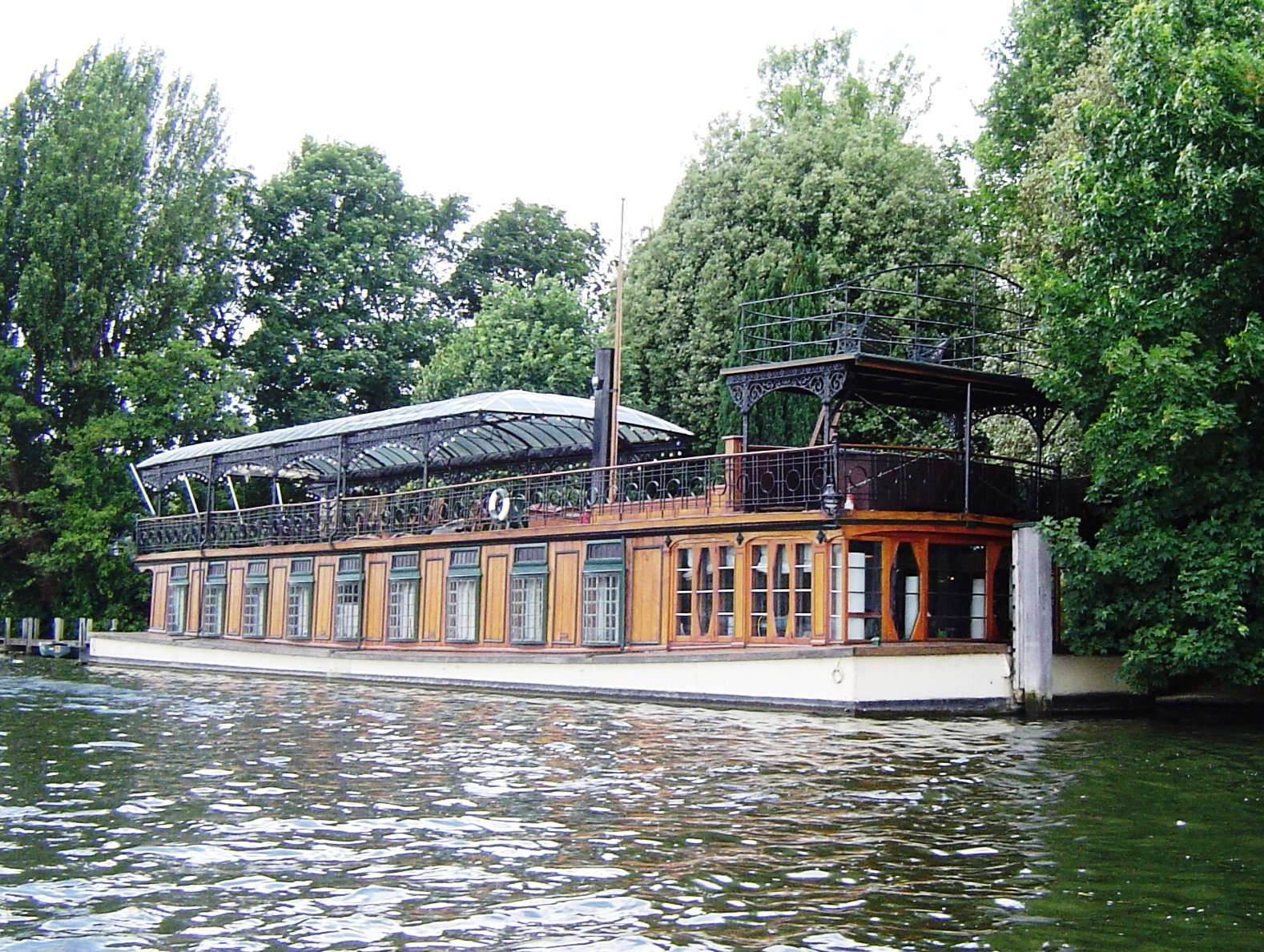
The houseboat from the river in 2008

Astoria is a grand houseboat moored on the River Thames at Hampton in the London Borough of Richmond upon Thames, between Garrick's Temple to Shakespeare and St Alban's Riverside. Astoria was built in 1911 for impresario Fred Karno, proprietor of the short-lived Karsino Hotel on nearby Tagg's Island. Astoria was purchased in 1986 by Pink Floyd guitarist David Gilmour, who converted the houseboat into a floating recording studio, recording and mixing several Pink Floyd and solo albums on board, including A Momentary Lapse of Reason and The Division Bell.

== History ==
=== Fred Karno ===
Astoria was built in 1911 for music hall theatre impresario Fred Karno. Karno had owned a houseboat named Highland Lassie, moored on Tagg's Island, since 1903. After a period of successful ventures Karno sought to upgrade his riverside accommodations, approaching Henry Hewitt, owner of the impressive houseboat Satsuma, anchored upstream at nearby Platt's Eyot, for advice, and instructing his stage carpenter Bill Day to build preparatory wooden scale models for a much larger houseboat. Once plans were finalised by Hewitt, the hull was laid down in Brentford, and on completion moored at Tagg's Island.

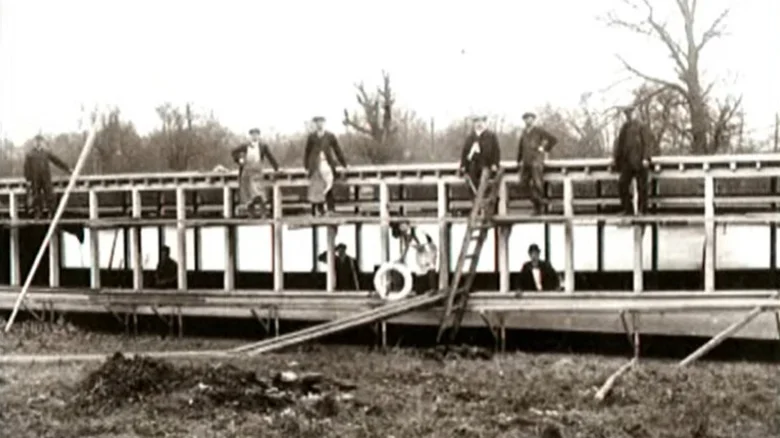
Workmen building Astoria's superstructure 1911

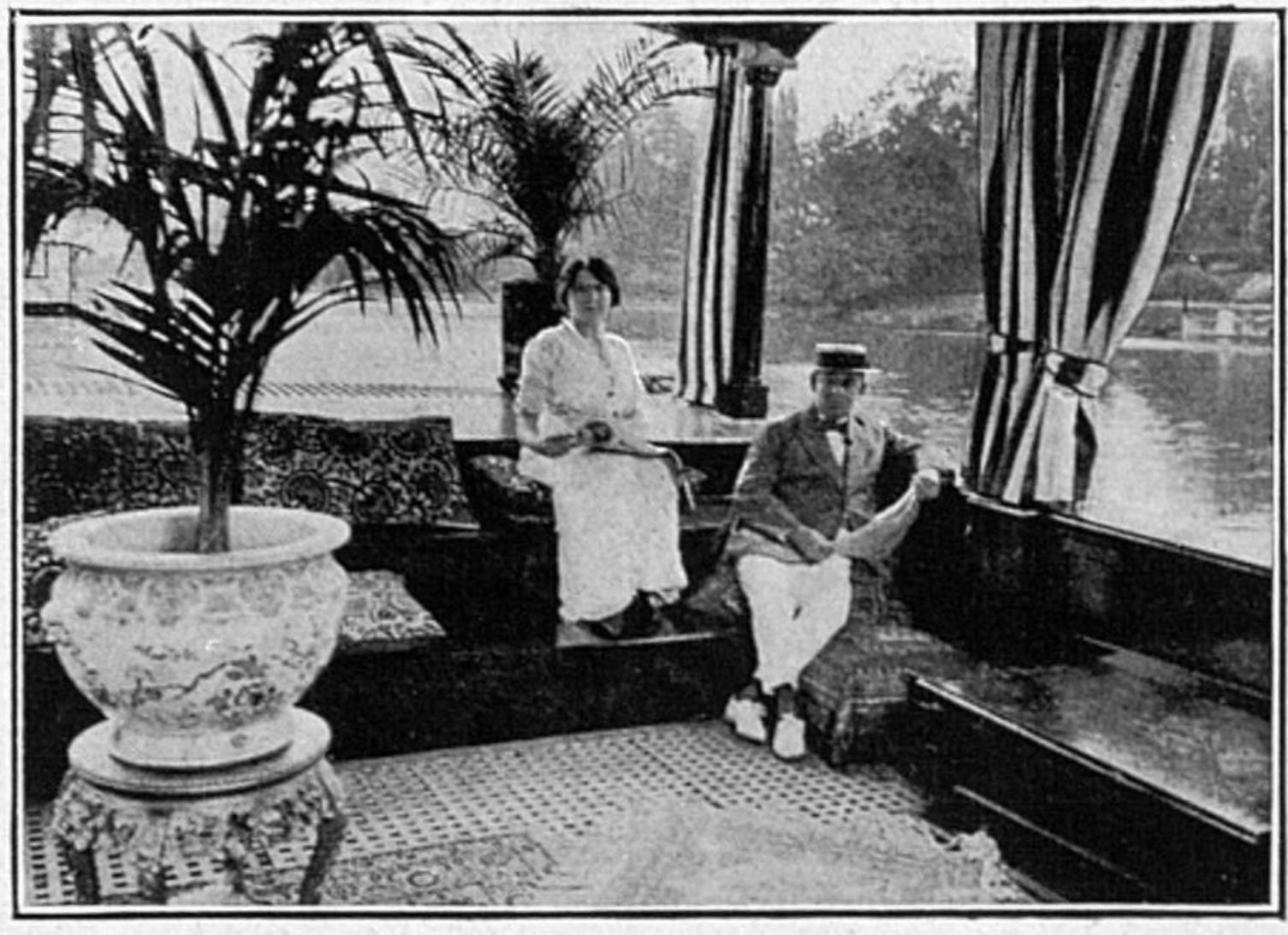
Edith and Fred Karno on the deck of Astoria, July 1913

Karno then commissioned local workman to construct the boat's superstructure, with the window frames installed by Crittals, the mahogany panelling for the saloon and cabins by Higgs of Loughborough Road, and the furnishing by Maple's of Tottenham Court Road. Astoria was crowned by a sun deck, 90 feet long and 18 feet wide, which could accommodate a full orchestra and dance floor under a canvas roof on a wrought iron frame strung with fairy lights. The boat was fitted with electric light supplied from the island, and supplied with water from an artesian bore. Astoria reputedly cost £7,500 to build.

After the failure of the Karsino Hotel and decline in music hall theatre Karno was declared bankrupt in 1926, and the Astoria sold.

=== Vesta Victoria ===
Astoria was purchased out of Karno's bankruptcy in 1926 by Vesta Victoria, music hall singer and comedian. Victoria resided on Astoria until her death in 1951. The houseboat was sold by her estate for £14,000, to a businessman who, seeking privacy, towed the houseboat to its current position upstream from Tagg's Island, moored on the left bank.

=== David Gilmour ===
I just happened to find this beautiful boat that was built as a houseboat and was very cheap, so I bought it. And then only afterward did I think I could maybe use it to record. The control room is a 30-foot by 20-foot room. It's a very comfortable working environment—three bedrooms, kitchen, bathroom, a big lounge. It's 90 feet long.

—David Gilmour

Pink Floyd lead guitarist David Gilmour purchased Astoria from Sir James Greenwood in 1986, after seeing it advertised for sale in a copy of Country Life magazine in his dentist's waiting room, just a short while after admiring it while being driven past its moorings.

In a 2008 interview recorded as part of a segment on Astoria on the BBC television programme Three Men in a Boat, Gilmour explained he had "spent half of [his] life in recording studios with no windows, no light, but on the boat there are many windows, with beautiful scenery on the outside".

Gilmour set about transforming Astoria into a fully-equipped recording studio, converting the dining room into a performing studio, and the connecting living room into a control studio holding the mixing desk. The conversion required 14 miles (23 km) of cables.

== Astoria as recording studio ==
Parts of each of the last three Pink Floyd studio albums and three of David Gilmour's solo albums were recorded on Astoria.

=== Pink Floyd ===
==== A Momentary Lapse of Reason ====
A Momentary Lapse of Reason (1987) was recorded mostly on Astoria between November 1986 and March 1987. (Note: Recording was completed at A&M Studios in Los Angeles.) In a 1993 interview with Guitar World magazine producer Bob Ezrin, (Note: Ezrin also played bass on the record in lieu of Roger Waters.) recalled:

Working on that boat was the most magical recording experience I've ever had. Sitting every day and watching the geese fly, the school-kids rowing, and the little old English fishermen on the bank created a kind of river atmosphere that permeates the whole album. ... It's not a huge environment so we couldn't keep the amps in the same room with us, and we were forced to use slightly smaller amplifiers. But after playing around with them in the demo stages of the project, we found that we really liked the sound. So a Fender Princeton and a little G&K amp became the backbone of Dave's guitar sound for that record.

Recording started on an analogue 24-track recorder with overdubs onto a 32-track Mitsubishi digital recorder, the band's first use of digital recording to tape. More rudimentary technologies were also employed: Ezrin recording the Astoria's boatman, Langley Iddens, rowing on the Thames for the opening track Signs of Life. Gilmour stayed on board Astoria alone one weekend in which he recorded the entirety of closing track Sorrow, including guitar, vocals and drum machine parts.

==== The Division Bell and The Endless River ====
Following initial sessions at Britannia Row Studios, the list of songs for The Division Bell (1994) was cut down between February and May 1993 in sessions primarily held on Astoria. Following a week's recording at Olympic Studios, the band returned to Astoria to record the backing tracks.

Material from the 1993 The Division Bell sessions recorded on Astoria was used on The Endless River (2014). Numerous photographs taken in 1993 of the band recording The Division Bell on board the Astoria appear on the album sleeve of The Endless River.

==== Other albums ====
The Pink Floyd live album Pulse (1995) and Pulse film (1995) were both mixed on Astoria.

=== David Gilmour ===
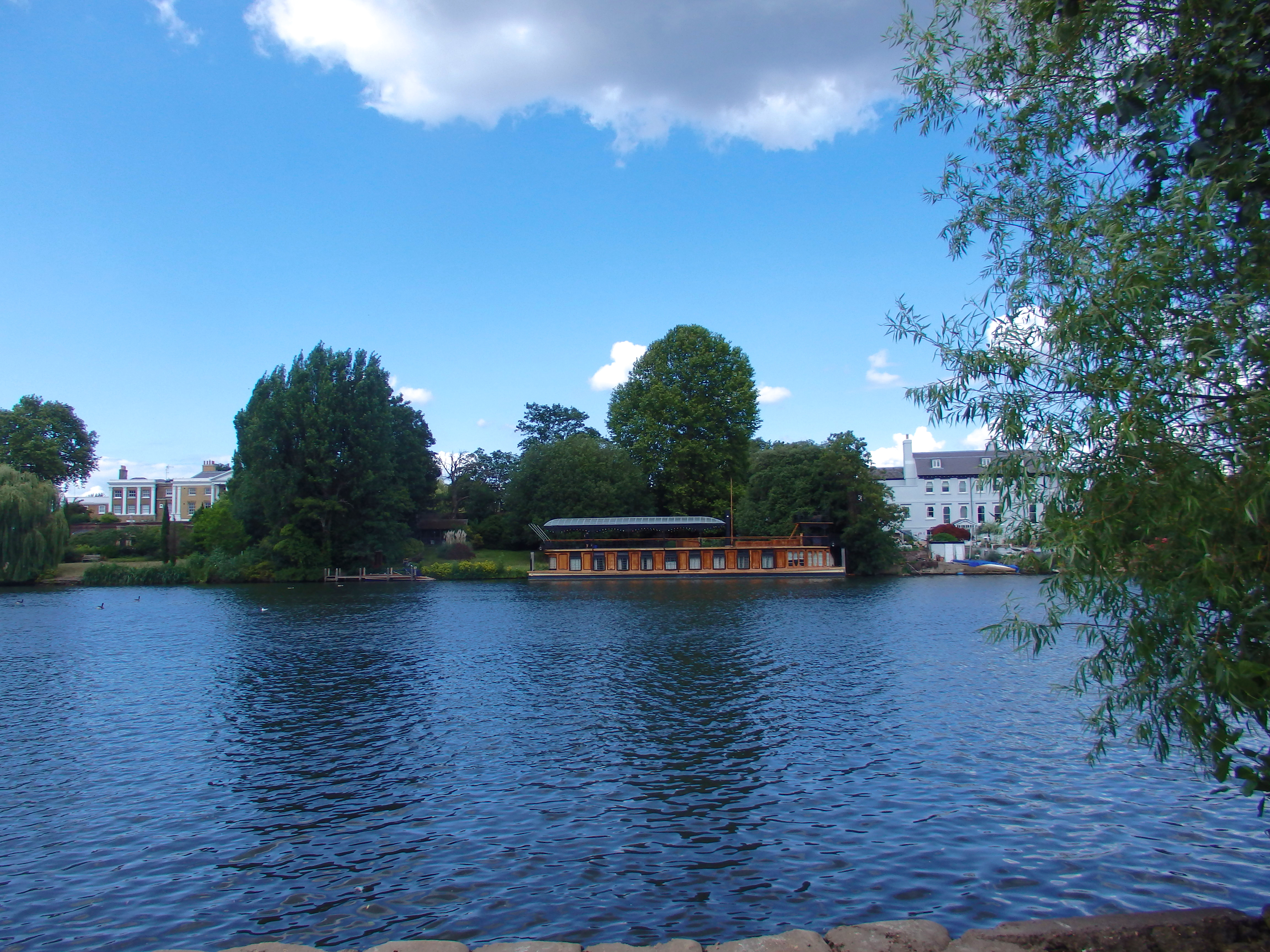
The houseboat at its mooring station in Hampton, seen from Hurst Park in 2019

In 2002 Gilmour recorded and performed on Astoria an arrangement of William Shakespeare's Sonnet 18 ("Shall I compare thee to a summer's day?") by composer / conductor Michael Kamen, written for When Love Speaks (2002), a compilation album featuring interpretations of Shakespeare's sonnets and play excerpts. The album version was recorded by Bryan Ferry; however, when Ferry was unable to attend the launch benefit concert (Note: Held at The Old Vic Theatre on 10 February 2002.) Gilmour performed in Ferry's place. Gilmour's performance of Sonnet 18 on Astoria around that time was included as an extra on the David Gilmour in Concert (2002) DVD, and shows Gilmour singing on the Astoria, the Astoria's interiors and mixing desk, and nearby scenes and exterior shots on the Thames.

Gilmour recorded most of his third solo studio album On an Island (2006) on Astoria, produced by Phil Manzanera and Chris Thomas. The recording features the last recorded performance of Richard Wright before his death in 2008.

Parts of Gilmour's fourth and fifth solo studio albums, Rattle That Lock (2015) and Luck and Strange (2024), were recorded and mixed on Astoria.

=== Richard Wright ===
Wright recorded parts of his second solo album Broken China (1996) on the Astoria, shortly after the sessions for The Division Bell.

=== Other artists ===
Kula Shaker recorded some of their album Peasants, Pigs & Astronauts (1999) on the Astoria.

Muse recorded parts of their second album Origin of Symmetry (2001) on the Astoria. The sessions were memorialised in photographs by Antonio Petronzio.

=== Equipment ===
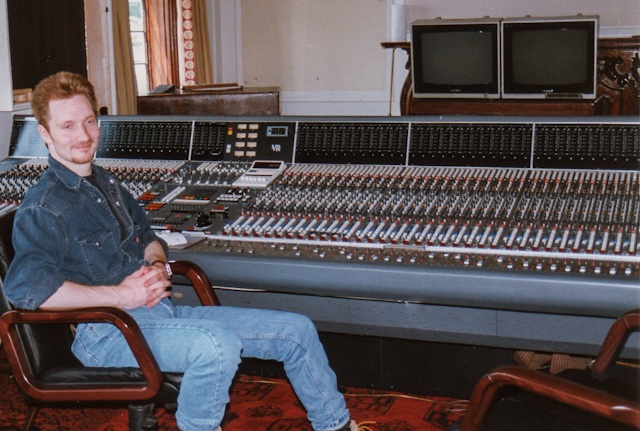
The studio mixing desk, around 1996

According to an interview with Phil Taylor (Gilmour's guitar technician), the studio on the Astoria was originally equipped with a DDA AMR 24 mixer console and UREI 813 studio main monitors with Phase Linear amps. The UREI 813s were replaced around 1990 by ATC main monitors. Customised ATC SCM150ASL active speakers are used for the main left and right channels with a standard ATC SCM150ASL active speaker used as the centre channel. The centre channel sits above an ATC SCM0.1–15 subwoofer. The surround monitors are two ATC SCM50ASLs. A variety of near-field monitor speakers are used including Yamaha NS-10s and Auratones depending on who happens to be working at the studio. The acoustic design was done with the assistance of Nick Whitaker, an independent acoustician, and much of the equipment was recommended by James Guthrie and Andrew Jackson. Nowadays the Astoria has a Neve 88R mixing console, as well as three Studer A827 multi-tracks and Ampex ATR-100 tape recorders, which were modified by Tim de Paravicini, Esoteric Audio Research's (EAR) founder. The conversion to a studio also required 14 miles (23 km) of cables, which were sourced from Van den Hul cables of the Netherlands. There are various compressors from Pye and EAR 660 tube designs, as well as EAR 825s for EQ.

A 2007 George Shilling interview for Resolution magazine with recording engineer Andrew Jackson on Astoria records extensive details on the equipment setup on board.

== Notes and sources ==
=== Sources ===
Adeler, Edwin; West, Con (1939). Remember Fred Karno?. London: John Long.

Baker, Rowland G.M. (1989). "Fred Westcott". Thameside Molesey. Buckingham: Barracuda Books. pp. 79–82. ISBN 0-86023-414-2.

Baker, Rowland G.M. (1989). "Willow'd Aytes". Thameside Molesey. Buckingham: Barracuda Books. pp. 95–101. ISBN 0-86023-414-2.

Blake, Mark (2013). Pigs Might Fly: the Inside Story of Pink Floyd. London: Aurum Entertainment. ISBN 9781781310571.

Clayton, Marie (2013). Pink Floyd. Rickmansworth: Atlantic Publishing.

Fitch, Vernon (1999). The Pink Floyd Encyclopedia. Ontario: Collector's Guide Publishing. ISBN 1896522440.

Guesdon, Jean-Michel (2017). Pink Floyd: All The Songs - the story behind every track. New York: Black Dog & Leventhal.

Mason, Nick (2005). Inside Out: a Personal History of Pink Floyd. London: Phoenix. ISBN 9780753819067.

Touzeau, Jeff (March 2005). "Phil Taylor". Tape Op (46).

Povey, Glenn (2010). Echoes: the Complete History of Pink Floyd. Chicago: Chicago Review Press. ISBN 978-1-56976-313-1.
