= Gary Wallis =

British musical artist (born 1964)

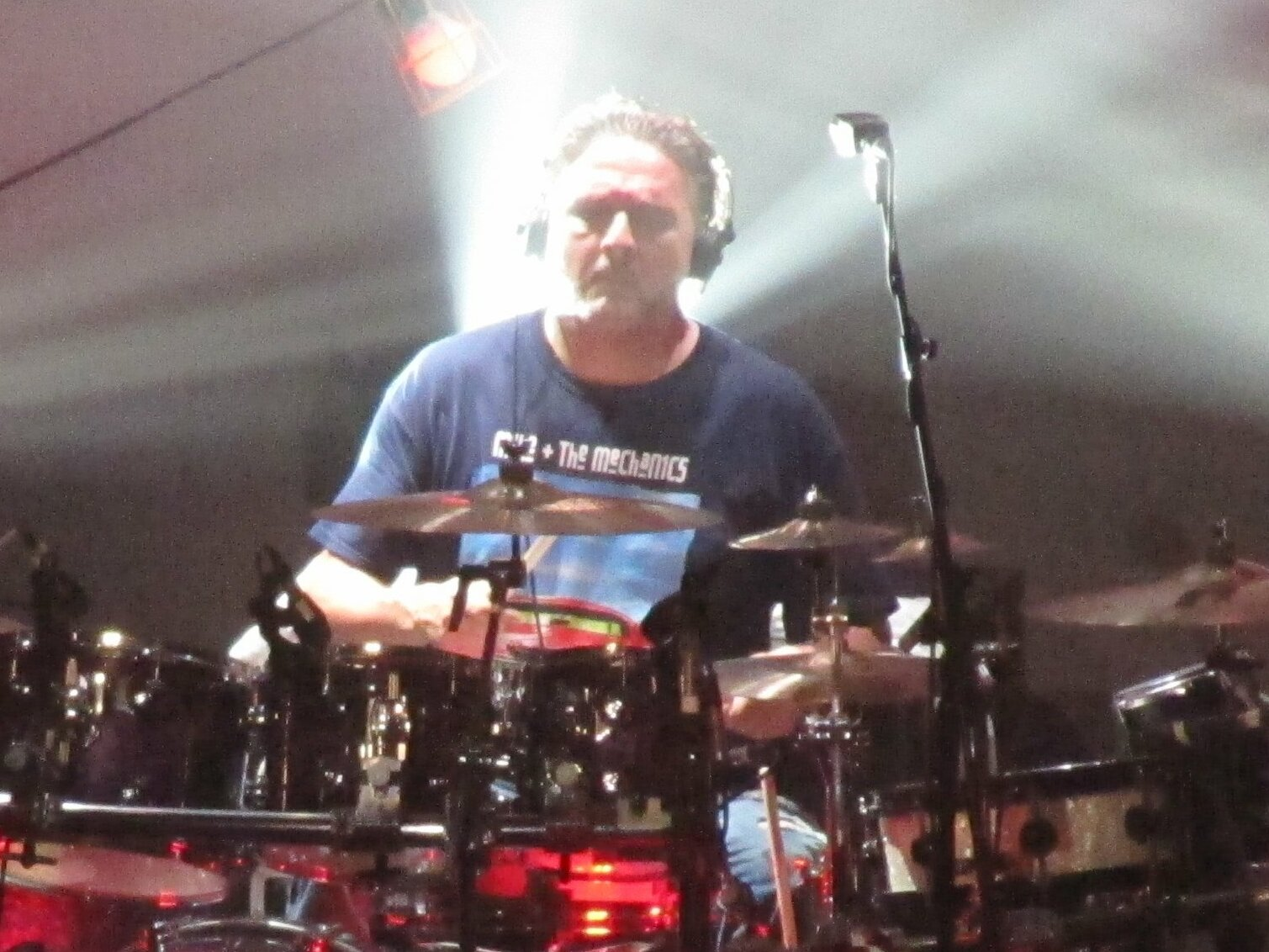
- Wallis performing with Mike and the Mechanics in 2015

Background information
- Born: Gary Wallis; June 10, 1964 (age 62); Westminster, London, England
- Genres: Rock; pop
- Occupations: Musician; musical director; producer
- Instruments: Drums; percussion; keyboards
- Years active: 1981–present
- Formerly of: Pink Floyd, Schiller, The Style Council, 10cc, Mike + The Mechanics

Gary Wallis (born 10 June 1964) is a British drummer, percussionist, drum programmer, producer and musical director. He has worked with a wide range of artists and bands, including Nik Kershaw, Pink Floyd, 10cc, Il Divo, Westlife, Girls Aloud, Atomic Kitten, Paul Carrack, Dusty Springfield, Bonnie Tyler, Mike Rutherford, Mike + The Mechanics, Spice Girls, All Saints, Tom Jones, Jean-Michel Jarre, Helene Fischer and Schiller.

== Early career ==
As a young drummer/percussionist, Gary Wallis worked with a number of prominent British bands. From 1982 to 1984, he was the drummer for the Truth, working alongside Chris Skornia (Hammond organ/keyboards); Dennis Greaves (guitar); Mick Lister (guitar) and Brian Bethell (bass).

After leaving the Truth, Wallis went on to perform as a percussionist with Style Council (1984–1985). He was invited by David Bowie to perform as a percussionist at the Live Aid concert at Wembley Stadium, London, 13 July 1985, with Robert Palmer and Power Station, as well as Duran Duran.

In the mid to late eighties, Wallis was drummer for the Krew, the backing band for Nik Kershaw (Riddle and Radio Musicola tours) and Chris Farlowe (1988). It was at a Kershaw concert where his energetic playing and elaborate percussion set-up drew the attention of key Pink Floyd musicians to Gary Wallis.

== Pink Floyd (1987–1994) ==
Wallis is perhaps best known as the percussionist for Pink Floyd in the post-Waters era for both their live and recorded performances. Pink Floyd's drummer Nick Mason described the first time that he and David Gilmour saw Wallis play: "Wallis was spotted playing percussion with Nick Kershaw at a charity show where Gilmour was also appearing. Neither of us had ever seen anything like it. Instead of sitting down to play Gary was working in a kind of cage stuffed full of percussion, some pieces of which were mounted so high that a three-foot leap was needed to strike the required object. With his obvious musical skills this additional showmanship seemed an ideal bonus for a stage that looked initially as though it might be occupied by the living dead."

Wallis was invited to join Pink Floyd, playing on their A Momentary Lapse of Reason Tour (which was released as Delicate Sound of Thunder in 1988). Blake (2008, p. 328) describes Wallis's playing as a "highly visual performing style – attacking an array of gongs, drums and cymbals mounted around him in a cage – was the perfect contrast to Mason's considerably more restrained approach."

He continued to perform with Pink Floyd until they took a break after their final tour concert at the Knebworth Festival in August 1990. Wallis has stated that performing live at Knebworth with Pink Floyd (1990) was one of the most memorable moments of his career.

From 1990 to 1992, Gary Wallis performed alongside various members of Pink Floyd in different bands, including Blue Pearl (1990), The Dream Academy with Gilmour and Guy Pratt (1991) and Jimmy Nail with Gilmour (1992). In December 1991, Wallis performed at the Amnesty International 30th Anniversary Concert, as part of a band directed by Gilmour. At the performance, the band backed Tom Jones and Spinal Tap, the "fictional" heavy metal band. Spinal Tap is known for its succession of drummers who "they claim died under odd circumstances", and Wallis was shown "exploding" at the end of the performance. The following year, he performed alongside Gilmour and other Pink Floyd band members at the Chelsea Arts Ball.

In 1993–94 Wallis played percussion during sessions for Pink Floyd's then-upcoming album, The Division Bell (1994). He went on to perform with them on The Division Bell world tour, during the European leg of which Pink Floyd recorded the Pulse live album and video, with Wallis playing percussion.

In the same year, Wallis and Gilmour attended a concert in Croydon by the tribute band the Australian Pink Floyd, afterwards inviting the band to attend The Division Bell end of tour party.

The drum sets used by Wallis and Mason on The Division Bell tour and Pulse DVD were from the Drum Workshop (DW). Mason states, "Gary Wallis and I ended up with thirty-odd drums, twenty pads, forty-odd cymbals and innumerable other bits of junk bolted to the drum risers, an installation that should have qualified us for the Turner Prize."

Wallis's playing with Pink Floyd can also be seen and heard in the box set, The Later Years 1987–2019.

== 10cc (1993–1995) ==
After disbanding in the eighties, two of the original four members of the British rock group 10cc re-formed in 1992 to record new tracks. They subsequently undertook a tour of Japan in 1993, with Gary Wallis as their drummer. Their tour recording Alive in Japan featured Eric Stewart (vocals, guitar, keyboard), Graham Gouldman (vocals, bass, guitar), Rick Fenn (vocals, guitar, bass), Stuart Tosh (vocals, percussion), Stephen Piggott (keyboards) and Gary Wallis (drums). In 1995, 10cc released their album Mirror Mirror with Gary Wallis playing drums and percussion.

== Jean-Michel Jarre (1999–2000) ==
Gary Wallis performed in front of a crowd of 50,000 with French musician Jean-Michel Jarre at a 12-hour The Twelve Dreams of the Sun concert at the Giza pyramids on New Year's Eve 1999/2000. The spectacular concert was part of Egypt's millennium festivities, which included a giant party at the pyramids. Wallis played drums and percussion alongside Jean-Michel Jarre (musical direction, keyboards, laser harp, vocals), Francis Rimbert (keyboards), Joachim Garraud (keyboards), Christopher Papendieck (bass), as well as a thousand singers, dancers and musicians.

== Tom Jones (1991–present) ==
Wallis has collaborated on various tours and concert events over two decades with legendary Welsh singer Sir Tom Jones, as his drummer and musical director, including residencies in Las Vegas.

From 2009 to 2011, Wallis toured extensively with Tom Jones, performing in the UK, Europe, USA, South America, Australia, New Zealand, South-East Asia, South Africa, the Middle East, and the Russian Federation. Other band members on the 2011 tour were: Davide Bronze (bass guitar); Jamie Moses (guitar); Toby Chapman (keyboard); Lutz Rainer Krajenski (keyboard); Laura Critchley (backing vocals); Sophie Hiller (backing vocals); Francis Samuel Walden (saxophone) and Trevor Mires (trombone). On earlier tours Wallis worked with musicians Christoph Papendieck (keyboards), Peter Honoré (guitarist), Alex Meadows (bass), Janet Ramus (backing vocals) and Abbie Osmon (backing vocals).

Wallis has appeared as the drummer for Tom Jones in significant televised performances, including the opening of the 2012 BAFTA (British Academy of Film and Television Arts) award ceremony and the Diamond Jubilee Concert at Buckingham Palace. He has also played many shows with Sir Tom in 2013, 2014, 2015 and went on a world tour with Sir Tom in 2016.

== Mike and the Mechanics (1995–present) ==
From 1995 to 1999, Wallis was the drummer for Mike + The Mechanics, working with Paul Young (vocals), Mike Rutherford (guitar, bass), Paul Carrack (vocals, keyboard), Tim Renwick (guitar) and Jamie Moses (guitar).

In 1997, Wallis performed with Paul Carrack's band as part of the Beautiful World album promotion.

Wallis played on 1999 Mechanics tour, which became the last for several years, due to Paul Young's untimely death. In 2003, a comeback of the band was announced by Rutherford, and Wallis performed in their concert at Shepherd's Bush Empire in London, which was filmed and released as a live DVD by Eagle Rock Entertainment.

Wallis has been the drummer for the re-formed Mike + The Mechanics, from 2011 to the present day. He has played both in recordings and live acts, including last year's sold-out tours. He played on their returning album, The Road, released in April 2011, Let Me Fly (2017) and their last-to-date album, Out Of The Blue (2019). In 2011 he performed across the UK, Germany, and other European cities on their Hit the Road Tour, "The Hits Tour", in 2017 with "Let Me Fly Tour", and in 2019 with a greatest hits across Europe. For the new 2023 tour, Mike picked Phil Collins's son Nic Collins, after the last tour of Genesis (2021-2022), in which he also played drums with the group.

== Electronic drums and programming ==
Wallis has also worked extensively as a drum programmer. In an interview for Roland UK, Wallis declared his "complete thirst for electronic drums". He is known for performing on an elaborate, massive drum set-up featuring both acoustic and electronic drums. Wallis used this configuration of instruments during his work with the German band Schiller, among others.

== Schiller (2001–2004; 2018–) ==
Between 2001 and 2004, he toured Germany with the electronic ambient band Schiller, led by Christopher von Deylen. During this time, he worked alongside many prominent artists, including the celebrated musical theatre singer Sarah Brightman and renowned German pop singer Peter Heppner.

Wallis played live on Schiller's first live concert, "Voyage," on 9/19/2001 at Gum Club in Hamburg, Germany. Wallis also played on the Europe wide hit I Feel You.

Wallis played percussion on Schiller's Live (Er)Leben album (2004) and drums/percussion on the Tag Und Nacht (Day and Night) album (tracks 2, 10, 15 and 18), released in 2005 by Island Records and Universal Music, Germany. The album was also released in Russia (2005 & 2008) and the USA (2007).

Wallis contributes drums to Schiller upcoming album "Morgenstund" and is expected to follow Christopher von Deylen on the next live tour in 2019.

== Producer ==
Together with long-term colleague Toby Chapman, Wallis has co-produced tracks for artists such as Paul Carrack (1996), Belinda Carlisle (1997), Rod Stewart (2000), Cher (2001), Swedish band Addis Black Widow (2001), and Zididada, a Danish act signed to Universal Denmark (2003).

== Musical director ==
In the latter part of his career, Wallis has been in demand as a musical director and drummer. From 2004 to the present, Wallis has toured extensively around the world in this role with various bands and solo artists, including Girls Aloud, Atomic Kitten, Il Divo, Westlife (Back Home Tour) and Sir Tom Jones. multi-artist concerts such as Children In Need, The Prince's Trust, Amnesty International, and Nordoff Robins

== Philosophy on drumming ==
In the Roland UK interview with Ben Stone, Wallis explains his own approach to drumming:

"There's nothing you would call real 'drummer's drummer', cause, you know, that's not my thing. I like to play in a band and be part of the team. I like to watch all those other really good guys play the fancy stuff!" Stone then asked Wallis about the importance of this aspect of playing in the current musical climate, with so many drum clinics taking place. Wallis stated, "It's a very precarious subject really ... Not for me. It doesn't work for me, 'cause I've never enjoyed that aspect of drumming at all. But, I really marvel in it and I wonder in it and I watch it myself and think, "wow!". I don't know how much it applies to any music that you record, or bands that you play with. I mean, it's great to have all those chops and it allows you to interpret whatever's in your mind, which is great, but, it's never really been for me. I mean, I like band drummers ... I like to see bands as a cohesive unit and no-one sticking out too much."

== Other ==
Gary Wallis is the cousin of Pink Fairies guitarist and former member of Motörhead, Larry Wallis.

== Drums ==
Wallis is known to use instruments from Vater Percussion as well as Drum Workshop.

1987–1990 touring kit with Pink Floyd (A Momentary Lapse Of Reason Tour):

Tama Artstar piano black finish.

Zildjian Cymbals.

Simmons Electronic drums (SDS9 Pads, MTM, MTX).

Akai S900 Digital Sampler.

LP Latin Percussion.

1994 Pink Floyd touring kit (Division Bell Tour):

DW Drums (Drum Workshop) kit in Exotic Birdseye Maple with a lacquer finish.

Zildjian cymbals.

Latin percussion.

Vater drumsticks.

Dauz electronic drums.

Yamaha DTS-70 drum trigger system & DMP-7 mixer.

Kurzweil K2000r sampler.

== Discography ==
- 1983, The Truth: Confusion (Hits Us Everytime) – WEA Records (drums)
- 1985, Style Council: Our Favourite Shop; Polydor (percussion)
- 1986, Bucks Fizz: Writing on the Wall; Polydor (percussion)
- 1986, John Wilson: The Sun Ain't Gonna Shine; Legacy Records (drums/percussion)
- 1987, So: Horseshoe in the Glove; EMI (percussion)
- 1989, Pink Floyd: Delicate Sound of Thunder (video); (percussion/keyboards)
- 1990, Blue Pearl: Blue Pearl (percussion)
- 1990, Pink Floyd: Knebworth – The Album; Polydor (percussion)
- 1990, Dusty Springfield: Reputation; Parlophone (percussion)
- 1991, Heeren Stevens: Trust; Bronze (drums)
- 1992, Westernhagen: Jaja; WEA Musik (percussion)
- 1993, 10cc: Alive in Japan, released 2002 by Sanctuary, (drums)
- 1994, Zero: Zero, released by Sony Music Portugal (drums)
- 1995, 10cc: Mirror Mirror (drums)
- 1995, Pink Floyd: Pulse; EMI (percussion)
- 1995, Mike and the Mechanics: Beggar on a Beach of Gold; Atlantic (drums)
- 1995, Miguel Mateos: Pisanlov; Curb (assistant engineer)
- 1995, The Pharcyde: Labcabincalifornia; Delicious Vinyl (engineer)
- 1996, Pastilla: Pastilla; Aztlan Records (engineer)
- 1996, Bonnie Tyler: Free Spirit; Atlantic (drums/percussion)
- 1996, Mike and the Mechanics: Hits; Virgin (drums)
- 1996, Paul Carrack: Beautiful World; Ark 21 Records (producer, drums)
- 1996, Paul Carrack: Blue Views; (producer)
- 1996, Cameron Silver: Berlin to Babylon: Hollywood (engineer, mixing)
- 1997, Belinda Carlisle: I Won't Say (I'm in Love); Walt Disney Records (producer)
- 1998, Chris Farlowe: The Voice; Intuition (drums)
- 1998, Style Council: The Complete Adventures of the Style Council (percussion)
- 1999, Szina: Heavenly; Stella Music (producer/arranger)
- 1999, Tom Jones and the Cardigans: Burning Down the House; Mushroom Records (producer)
- 1999, Mike and The Mechanics: Mike and the Mechanics; Virgin (drums/programming)
- 1999, Paul Thorn: Ain't Love Strange; Ark21 (drums)
- 2000, Addis Black Widow: Goes Around Comes Around; Instant Karma (co-producer/mixing)
- 2001, Rod Stewart: Human; Atlantic (string arrangements)
- 2002, Sort Sol: Golden Wonder; Mercury (producer/programming/mixing/arranging)
- 2003, The Beautiful South: Gaze; Universal (programming)
- 2004, Schiller: Live (Er)Leben; Universal/Island (percussion)
- 2004, Blue: Breathe Easy (mixing)
- 2004, Marianne Rosenberg: Für immer wie heute (DVD); SPV (drums/percussion)
- 2004: Fire Escape: While We're Here; Orchard (bass, vocals)
- 2005, Schiller: Tag Und Nacht; Island Records (drums/percussion)
- 2005, Girls Aloud: Long Hot Summer; Polydor (drums/mixing)
- 2005, Mike and the Mechanics: Live at Shepherds Bush London (DVD); Eagle Rock Entertainment (drums)
- 2006, Pink Floyd: Pulse; Columbia (percussion)
- 2009, The Fishermen: Respect for These Knights (The Copenhagen Secret Gig); The Godfather Records (drums)
- 2010, Romanzo Criminale: Romanzo Criminale; X Note (drums)
- 2011, Mike and the Mechanics: The Road; Arista (drums)
- 2017, Mike and the Mechanics: Let Me Fly; BMG (drums)
- 2019, Mike and the Mechanics: Out of the blue; BMG (drums)
- 2019, Pink Floyd: The Later Years 1987–2019; Pink Floyd Records (percussion)
