= Polly Samson =

English writer

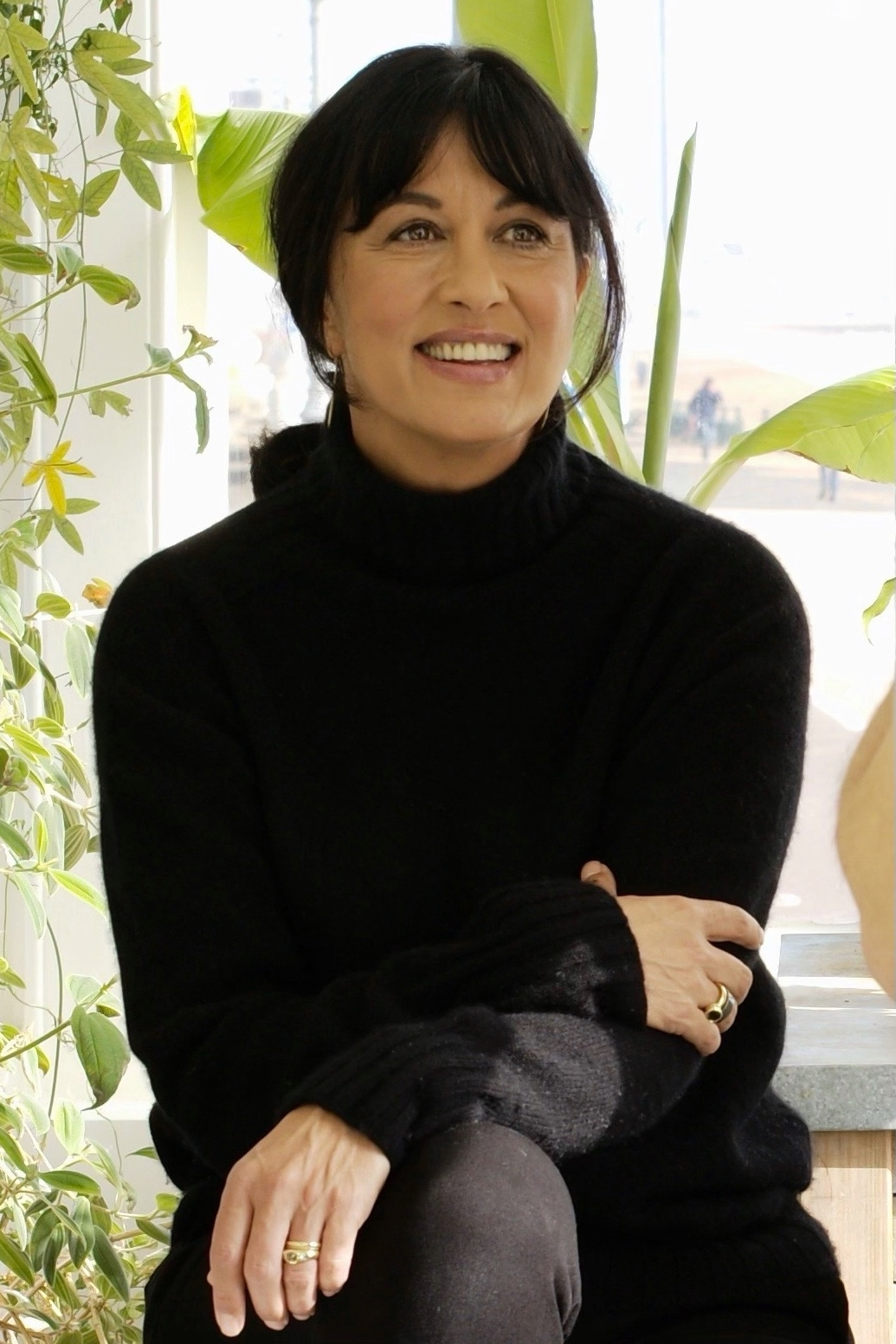
- Samson in 2020
- Born: 29 April 1962 (age 64); London, England
- Occupations: Journalist; novelist; songwriter
- Notable work: Perfect Lives; The Kindness; The Division Bell; The Endless River; On an Island; Rattle That Lock; A Theatre For Dreamers
- Spouse: David Gilmour (m. 1994)
- Children: 4
- Website: pollysamson.com

Polly Samson (born 29 April 1962) is an English novelist, lyricist and journalist. She is married to the musician David Gilmour and has written lyrics for many of his songs, including albums with his band Pink Floyd.

== Life and career ==
Samson's father was Lance Samson, a newspaper editor and diplomatic correspondent for the Morning Star. He and his Jewish family lived in Hamburg, from where he fled from Nazi persecution as a child on the Kindertransport, coming to England as a refugee. Her mother was Esther Cheo Ying, a Chinese-English writer whose memoir, Black Country to Red China, dealt with her time serving as a major in Mao Zedong's Red Army. Samson's mother's second husband was the British journalist Alan Winnington.

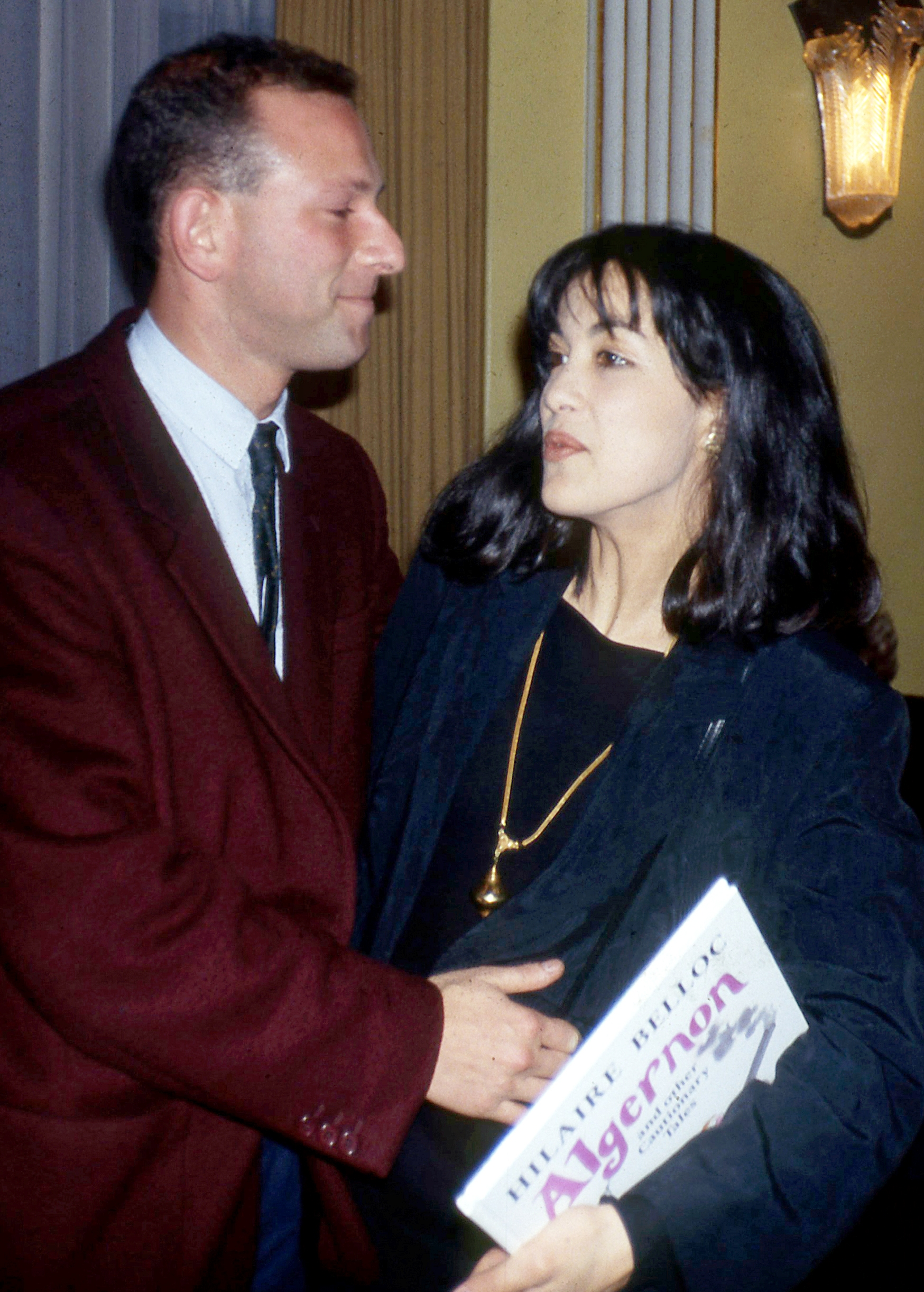
At a party with William Sieghart in 1991

=== Fiction ===
Following a troubled childhood, Samson joined the publishing industry, through which she met the writer Heathcote Williams, with whom she became romantically involved during the publication of his book-length poem Whale Nation (1988). Samson was responsible for publicising what became a best-selling volume, despite Williams's reluctance to promote his own work. With Williams she had her first son, Charlie. Following his birth, Samson became homeless and was taken in for a period by the journalist Cassandra Jardine.

Samson has written short stories for BBC Radio 4 and has had a collection published Lying in Bed (Virago 1999) and a novel, Out of the Picture (Virago 2000). She contributed to books and publications including Gas and Air (Bloomsbury 2003), Girls Night In (Harper Collins 2000), A Day in the Life (Black Swan 2003), and The Just When Stories (Beautiful Books 2010). Samson's collection of stories, Perfect Lives, was published in November 2010 by Virago Press. Her novel The Kindness was published in 2015.

In 2018, Samson was made a Fellow of the Royal Society of Literature. Her novel A Theatre For Dreamers was published on 2 April 2020 by Bloomsbury Circus. The novel entered the Sunday Times Bestsellers Chart at number two. Gilmour provided music for the audiobook, which Samson read and he produced.

=== Music ===
After splitting from Williams, Samson met the Pink Floyd singer and guitarist David Gilmour. They married in 1994 during Pink Floyd's Division Bell tour. Her son with Heathcote Williams, Charlie, was adopted by Gilmour. They have three other children: Joe, Gabriel and Romany.

Samson is credited as a co-writer on seven songs on the 1994 Pink Floyd album The Division Bell. Gilmour said that Samson's involvement had bothered the management, but the producer, Bob Ezrin, said she had been inspirational for Gilmour and "pulled the whole album together". Samson did not want credit, saying "the idea of my name being attached to Pink Floyd was like some nightmare", but Gilmour insisted, telling her she would regret going uncredited. She later said he was right and that she had become used to him singing her lyrics.

Samson contributed lyrics to "Louder than Words", the only song on the 2014 Pink Floyd album The Endless River. She wrote lyrics for Gilmour's 2006 album On an Island, and made a guest appearance on piano and vocals. She also wrote lyrics for Gilmour's albums Rattle That Lock (2015) and Luck and Strange (2024).

On 6 February 2023, Samson tweeted to Gilmour's former Pink Floyd bandmate Roger Waters: "Sadly you are antisemitic to your rotten core. Also a Putin apologist and a lying, thieving, hypocritical, tax-avoiding, lip-synching, misogynistic, sick-with-envy, megalomaniac. Enough of your nonsense." Gilmour added: "Every word demonstrably true." Waters described the comments as "incendiary and wildly inaccurate".

== Works ==
- Lying in Bed – Virago Press Ltd, 2000; ISBN 1-86049-667-9
- Out of the Picture – Virago Press Ltd, 2001; ISBN 1-86049-864-7
- Perfect Lives – Virago Press Ltd, 2010; ISBN 1-86049-992-9
- The Kindness – Bloomsbury Publishing, 2015; ISBN 978-1632860675
- A Theatre for Dreamers – Bloomsbury Circus, 2020; ISBN 978-1526600554
