= Delicate Sound of Thunder (film) =

1989 concert film by Pink Floyd

- VHS cover of Delicate Sound of Thunder (U.S./JP/AUS versions)
- Directed by: Wayne Isham
- Produced by: Steve O'Rourke (VHS); Curt Marvis (VHS); Robbie Williams (VHS); David Gilmour (LD/DVD/BD)
- Starring: Pink Floyd
- Cinematography: Marc Reshovsky
- Edited by: Lisa Hendricks and Jeff Richter (VHS); Aubrey Powell (DVD/BD)
- Music by: Pink Floyd
- Distributed by: CBS Music Video Enterprises (non-Europe); Picture Music International (Europe)
- Release date: 13 June 1989
- Running time: 100 min (VHS); 90 min (LD); 115 min (DVD/BD)
- Language: English

Delicate Sound of Thunder is a concert film by Pink Floyd, filmed during their A Momentary Lapse of Reason Tour from 19 August 1988 to 23 August 1988 at the Nassau Coliseum in Uniondale, New York, with some additional footage from 21–22 June 1988 at the Place d'Armes of the Château de Versailles, Versailles, France. It was initially released on VHS, Video CD and Laserdisc formats. The film was nominated for a Grammy Award for Best Long Form Music Video at the 32nd Annual Grammy Awards.

The film was reissued on DVD and Blu-ray in 2019 as part of The Later Years 1987–2019 box set. This version was fully re-edited, remastered and restored from the original 35 mm film, and featured the fully remixed audio from the 2019 CD album. On 20 November 2020, a standalone version of the 2019 edit of the film was released, along with a deluxe box set containing both the DVD and Blu-Ray discs, as well as the album on CD and a 40-page booklet.

== Track listing (1989 release) ==
1. "Shine On You Crazy Diamond (Part I intro)"
2. "Signs of Life"
3. "Learning to Fly"
4. "Sorrow"
5. "The Dogs of War"
6. "On the Turning Away"
7. "One of These Days"
8. "Time"
9. "On the Run"
10. "The Great Gig in the Sky"
11. "Wish You Were Here"
12. "Us and Them"
13. "Money" NTSC USA version only
14. "Comfortably Numb"
15. "One Slip"
16. "Run Like Hell"
17. "Shine On You Crazy Diamond (Parts II-V)" (audio only; end credits)

=== Songs omitted from the film ===
The following songs which were part of the 1988 set were not included in the film:

- "Shine On You Crazy Diamond" (Part I beyond the intro and Parts II-V) *
- "Yet Another Movie" *
- "Round and Around" *
- "A New Machine"
- "Terminal Frost"
- "Welcome to the Machine"
- "Money" (PAL & Japanese version) *
- "Another Brick in the Wall (Part 2)" *

Songs with asterisk (*) are included in the album version.

"Yet Another Movie", "Round and Around", "A New Machine (Parts 1 & 2)" and "Terminal Frost" were released as part of the box set The Later Years 1987–2019, see below.

== 2019 reissue ==
The Delicate Sound of Thunder film was reissued on DVD and BD on 13 December 2019 as part of the box set The Later Years 1987–2019, which also includes an expanded version of the album. The reissue makes the song "Money" available in PAL regions for the first time. The box set (but not the same disc) also contains five bonus songs from the film which were not used in the original. A standalone version was released on 20 November 2020.

=== Track listing ===
1. "Shine On You Crazy Diamond (Parts 1–5)"
2. "Signs of Life"
3. "Learning to Fly"
4. "Sorrow"
5. "The Dogs of War"
6. "On the Turning Away"
7. "One of These Days"
8. "Time"
9. "On the Run"
10. "The Great Gig in the Sky"
11. "Wish You Were Here"
12. "Us and Them"
13. "Money"
14. "Comfortably Numb"
15. "One Slip"
16. "Run Like Hell
17. "Terminal Frost" (audio only; end credits)

The 2019 edit of the film now includes a full performance of "Shine On You Crazy Diamond", the original VHS only had the introduction to "Part 1" which was played over a montage of footage. "The Great Gig in the Sky" was originally presented in black and white, with some colour shots taken from the filmed performance at the Palace of Versailles. The new edit has no Versailles footage and is in full colour throughout. The closing credits originally showed a time-lapse of the stage being disassembled with "Shine On You Crazy Diamond (Parts 2-5)" playing – the 2019 version, however, has removed the time-lapse video and replaced it with a black screen accompanied by "Terminal Frost" as the credits music.

Although the film now includes "Money" in all regions, it is not the full performance. "Money" has been condensed in the same manner as the album version – eliminating Guy Pratt's bass solo and the female 'a cappella' section.

Bonus tracks

A separate DVD and BD in the box set also contains the following bonus tracks which are omitted from the original film and the 2019 re-edit:

1. "Yet Another Movie"
2. "Round and Around"
3. "A New Machine (Part 1)"
4. "Terminal Frost"
5. "A New Machine (Part 2)"

== Personnel ==
- David Gilmour - guitars, console steel guitar, vocals
- Nick Mason - drums
- Richard Wright – keyboards, piano, Hammond organ, vocals

with:

- Tim Renwick – guitars, vocals
- Jon Carin – keyboards, piano, programming, vocals
- Scott Page – saxophones, oboe, guitar
- Guy Pratt – bass, vocals
- Gary Wallis – percussion, additional keyboards on "Comfortably Numb"
- Rachel Fury – backing vocals, lead vocals on "The Great Gig In The Sky" (first verse)
- Durga McBroom – backing vocals, lead vocals on "The Great Gig In The Sky" (second verse)
- Machan Taylor (as Margret Taylor) - backing vocals, lead vocals on "The Great Gig In The Sky" (third verse)

== Certifications ==
Region	Certification	Certified units/sales
Canada (Music Canada)	2× Platinum	20,000^{^}
United States (RIAA)	2× Platinum	200,000^{^}
^{^} Shipments figures based on certification alone.
