= Pink Floyd videography =

Band videography

Pink Floyd discography
- Video albums: 10
- Music videos: 31

This article includes a complete list of contributions within video media for the British progressive rock band Pink Floyd.

Over the course of their career, Pink Floyd has released ten official home videos/DVDs and made 31 music videos.

== Music videos ==
Year	Music Video	Album	Director
1967	"Arnold Layne"	Non-album video	Derek Nice
1967	"See Emily Play"	Non-album video	
1967	"Apples and Oranges"	Non-album video	
1967	"Paint Box"	Non-album video	
1968	"Point Me at the Sky"	Non-album video	
1968	"Jugband Blues"	A Saucerful of Secrets	
1968	"Corporal Clegg"	A Saucerful of Secrets	
1973	"Money"	The Dark Side of the Moon	Wayne Isham
1973	"Brain Damage"	The Dark Side of the Moon	
1975	"Welcome to the Machine"	Wish You Were Here	Gerald Scarfe
1979	"Another Brick in the Wall Part 2"	The Wall	Gerald Scarfe
1983	"The Gunner's Dream"	The Final Cut	Willie Christie
1983	"The Final Cut"	The Final Cut	Willie Christie
1983	"Not Now John"	The Final Cut	Willie Christie
1983	"The Fletcher Memorial Home"	The Final Cut	Willie Christie
1987	"Learning to Fly"	A Momentary Lapse of Reason	Storm Thorgerson
1987	"On the Turning Away"	A Momentary Lapse of Reason	Larry Jordan
1987	"The Dogs Of War"	A Momentary Lapse of Reason	Storm Thorgerson
1988	"One Slip"	A Momentary Lapse of Reason	Larry Jordan
1988	"Comfortably Numb"	Delicate Sound of Thunder	Wayne Isham
1989	"One of These Days"	Delicate Sound of Thunder	Wayne Isham
1994	"Take It Back"	The Division Bell	Mark Brickman
1994	"High Hopes"	The Division Bell	Storm Thorgerson
2014	"Marooned"	The Division Bell	Aubrey Powell
2014	"Louder than Words"	The Endless River	Aubrey Powell
2014	"Surfacing"	The Endless River	Aubrey Powell
2016	"Childhood's End (2016 Remix)"	Obscured by Clouds	Aubrey Powell
2016	"Grantchester Meadows (BBC Session)"	Ummagumma	Aubrey Powell
2016	"Green Is The Colour (BBC Session)"	More	Aubrey Powell
2016	"Nothing Part 14"	Meddle	Aubrey Powell
2022	"Hey, Hey, Rise Up!"	Non-album video	Mat Whitecross

== Films/videos ==
Year	Title	Chart positions				Certifications
Year	Title	TVS	BCMV	TMV	TDS	Certifications
1972	Live at Pompeii: Released: September 1972; Label: Universal Home Video	—	40	16	—	BPI: 3× Platinum; MC: Gold; RIAA: 2× Platinum
1982	The Wall: Released: 6 August 1982; Label: MGM/UA Entertainment Company (theatrical), Sony Music Video (SMV) Enterprises	4	—	—	18	BPI: 5× Platinum; ARIA: 11× Platinum
1983	The Final Cut: Released: July 1983; Label: EMI, SMV	—	—	—	—	
1989	Delicate Sound of Thunder: Released: 13 June 1989; Label: CBS Music Video Enterprises	1	—	—	—	MC: 2× platinum; RIAA: 2× Platinum
1992	La Carrera Panamericana: Release: 2 June 1992; Label: SMV	38	—	—	—	
1995	P•U•L•S•E: Released: June 1995 (VHS), July 2006 (DVD); Label: EMI, SMV	5	—	—	—	BPI: 5× Platinum; ARIA: 14× Platinum; MC: 2× Platinum; RIAA: 8× Platinum
2003	The Pink Floyd and Syd Barrett Story: Released: 24 March 2003; Label: Universal Home Video	—	—	—	—	BPI: Platinum; MC: Gold
2003	Classic Albums: Pink Floyd – The Making of The Dark Side of the Moon: Released: 26 August 2003; Label: Isis Productions, Eagle Rock Entertainment	—	34	—	—	BPI: Platinum; ARIA: 4× Platinum; MC: 5× Platinum; RIAA: 3× Platinum
2005	London '66–'67: Released: 13 September 2005 (DVD); Label: Snapper Music	—	—	—	—	MC: Platinum
2012	The Story of Wish You Were Here: Released: 26 June 2012 (DVD, Blu-ray); Label: Eagle Rock Entertainment	—	—	—	—	ARIA: Gold
"—" denotes releases that did not chart or were not released in that country.
