= The Later Years =

2019 box set by Pink Floyd

Box set by Pink Floyd
- Released: 13 December 2019
- Recorded: 1969; 1986–1990; 1993–1994; 2013–2019
- Genre: Progressive rock
- Length: 259:48
- Label: Pink Floyd Records
- Producers: Pink Floyd; Bob Ezrin

Pink Floyd chronology
The Early Years 1965–1972 (2016)	The Later Years (2019)	The Dark Side of the Moon 50th Anniversary (2023)

The Later Years is a box set by the English rock band Pink Floyd, released on 13 December 2019 by Pink Floyd Records. It follows the 2016 box set The Early Years 1965–1972, and compiles Pink Floyd's work under the leadership of David Gilmour after the departure of Roger Waters in 1985.

The Later Years includes a remixed version of Pink Floyd's 1987 album A Momentary Lapse of Reason, with restored contributions by the keyboardist, Richard Wright, and new contributions by the drummer, Nick Mason, to "restore the creative balance between the three Pink Floyd members". The Later Years also includes surround sound mixes of A Momentary Lapse of Reason and The Division Bell (1994).

Also included is an expanded version of the 1988 live album Delicate Sound of Thunder with additional tracks; re-edited versions of the concert films Delicate Sound of Thunder (1989) and Pulse (1995); a live recording of Pink Floyd's headline performance at the Knebworth 1990 charity concert; a previously unreleased concert film from Pink Floyd's performance in Venice; 5.1 surround sound mixes and high-resolution stereo mixes; single B-sides; demos from The Division Bell sessions; and memorabilia.

A single-disc compilation of "highlights" from the box set, The Later Years: 1987–2019, was released on 29 November 2019.

== Contents ==
=== CD 1: A Momentary Lapse of Reason ===
A Momentary Lapse of Reason was the first Pink Floyd album released under the leadership of David Gilmour after the departure of Roger Waters in 1985. For The Later Years, the drummer, Nick Mason, rerecorded the drum parts (not all drum parts were played by Mason on the original release) and more of keyboardist Rick Wright's parts have been included (replacing parts which were played by session musicians on the original). "On the Turning Away" has a new lead vocal part taken from a live recording to replace the original studio recording. The album has been remixed for 2019. A standalone version was released on 29 October 2021 in deluxe CD and 2-disc 45 rpm vinyl formats.

1. "Signs of Life"
2. "Learning to Fly"
3. "The Dogs of War"
4. "One Slip"
5. "On the Turning Away"
6. "Yet Another Movie"
7. "Round and Around"
8. "A New Machine (Part 1)"
9. "Terminal Frost"
10. "A New Machine (Part 2)"
11. "Sorrow"

=== CDs 2 and 3: Delicate Sound of Thunder ===
The 1988 live album Delicate Sound of Thunder remixed and includes songs performed on the tour which were omitted from the original release. Some tracks are now presented in full which were shortened for the original release. "Money", however, has been truncated in order to accommodate the newly included and extended songs – the female a-cappella section and Pratt's bass solo have been removed. A few new elements have been included in the new version, taken from shows recorded in 1989, such as Wright's piano intro to "Us and Them" and extra children's chants included in "Another Brick in the Wall (Part 2)". A standalone album was released on 20 November 2020.

Disc 1

1. "Shine On You Crazy Diamond"
2. "Signs of Life" (previously unreleased)
3. "Learning to Fly"
4. "Yet Another Movie"
5. "Round and Around"
6. "A New Machine (Part 1)" (previously unreleased)
7. "Terminal Frost" (previously unreleased)
8. "A New Machine (Part 2)" (previously unreleased)
9. "Sorrow" (extended)
10. "The Dogs of War" (extended)
11. "On the Turning Away" (extended)

Disc 2

1. "One of These Days"
2. "Time"
3. "On the Run" (previously unreleased)
4. "The Great Gig in the Sky" (previously unreleased)
5. "Wish You Were Here"
6. "Welcome to the Machine" (previously unreleased)
7. "Us and Them"
8. "Money" (truncated)
9. "Another Brick in the Wall (Part 2)"
10. "Comfortably Numb" (extended)
11. "One Slip" (previously unreleased)
12. "Run Like Hell" (extended)

=== CD 4: 1987 and 1994 live recordings and unreleased studio recordings ===
Single B-sides released between 1987–1994:

1. "One of These Days" (Live in Hanover, 1994)
2. "Astronomy Domine" (Live in Miami, 1994)
3. "The Dogs of War" (Live in Atlanta, 1987)
4. "On the Turning Away" (Live in Atlanta, 1987)
5. "Run Like Hell" (Live in Atlanta, 1987)

Unreleased 1994 studio recordings:

1. "Blues 1"
2. "Slippery Guitar"
3. "Rick's Theme"
4. "David's Blues"
5. "Marooned Jam"
6. "Nervana"
7. "High Hopes (Early Version)"

=== CD 5: Live at Knebworth 1990 (Remixed) ===
Pink Floyd's headline set at the Silver Clef Award Winners Concert held at Knebworth House on 30 June 1990. The show was notable for featuring vocalist Clare Torry who reprised her lead vocal for "The Great Gig in the Sky" which she originally sang on The Dark Side of the Moon (1973) and featuring saxophonist Candy Dulfer on "Shine On You Crazy Diamond" and "Money". Although portions of this live recording have been available in the past, on the album Knebworth – The Album (1990), this was the first time it has been made available in full and in this remixed state. A standalone live album (but no DVD or BD) was released on 30 April 2021 on CD, vinyl and download.

1. "Shine On You Crazy Diamond"
2. "The Great Gig in the Sky" (with Clare Torry)
3. "Wish You Were Here"
4. "Sorrow"
5. "Money"
6. "Comfortably Numb" (previously released on Knebworth – The Album)
7. "Run Like Hell" (previously released on Knebworth – The Album)

=== Blu-ray: 5.1 surround sound mixes and high-resolution stereo mixes ===
Although a 5.1 surround sound mix of The Endless River is not presented on this disc, it is available as part of The Endless River film by Ian Eames, also included in the set.

- A Momentary Lapse of Reason (Updated & Remixed)
1. "Signs of Life"
2. "Learning to Fly"
3. "The Dogs of War"
4. "One Slip"
5. "On the Turning Away"
6. "Yet Another Movie"
7. "Round and Around"
8. "A New Machine (Part 1)"
9. "Terminal Frost"
10. "A New Machine (Part 2)"
11. "Sorrow"
- Unreleased 1994 studio recordings
1. "Blues 1"
2. "Slippery Guitar"
3. "Rick's Theme"
4. "David's Blues"
5. "Marooned Jam"
6. "Nervana"
7. "High Hopes (Early Version)"
- The Division Bell (2014 mix) (this is the same as that which appears in the 2014 box set reissue of The Division Bell)
1. "Cluster One"
2. "What Do You Want from Me"
3. "Poles Apart"
4. "Marooned"
5. "A Great Day for Freedom"
6. "Wearing the Inside Out"
7. "Take It Back"
8. "Coming Back to Life"
9. "Keep Talking"
10. "Lost for Words"
11. "High Hopes"

=== Blu-ray and DVD: Delicate Sound of Thunder ===
The band's 1988 concert film Delicate Sound of Thunder presented in a digitally remastered and re-edited picture and remixed audio in both 5.1 surround sound and stereo. This release also makes "Money" available in PAL regions for the first time.

1. "Shine On You Crazy Diamond (Parts 1–5)"
2. "Signs of Life"
3. "Learning to Fly"
4. "Sorrow"
5. "The Dogs of War"
6. "On the Turning Away"
7. "One of These Days"
8. "Time"
9. "On the Run"
10. "The Great Gig in the Sky"
11. "Wish You Were Here"
12. "Us and Them"
13. "Money" (previously unavailable in PAL regions)
14. "Comfortably Numb"
15. "One Slip"
16. "Run Like Hell"
17. "Terminal Frost" (audio only; end credits)

The 2019 edit of the film now includes a full performance of "Shine On You Crazy Diamond", the original VHS only had the introduction to "Part 1" which was played over a montage of footage. The closing credits originally showed a time-lapse of the stage being disassembled with "Shine On (Parts 2–5)" playing – the 2019 version, however, has removed the time-lapse video and replaced it with a black screen with "Terminal Frost" as the credits music. "Money" has been truncated in the same manner as the album version. The film still omits "Yet Another Movie", "Round and Around", "A New Machine", "Terminal Frost", "Welcome to the Machine", and "Another Brick in the Wall (Part 2)", however "Yet Another Movie", "Round and Around", "A New Machine", and "Terminal Frost" are featured as bonus material.

=== Blu-ray and DVD: Pulse ===
The 1995 concert film Pulse.

1. "Shine On You Crazy Diamond"
2. "Learning to Fly"
3. "High Hopes"
4. "Take It Back"
5. "Coming Back to Life"
6. "Sorrow"
7. "Keep Talking"
8. "Another Brick in the Wall (Part 2)"
9. "One of These Days"
10. "Speak to Me"
11. "Breathe (in the Air)"
12. "On the Run"
13. "Time"
14. "The Great Gig in the Sky"
15. "Money"
16. "Us and Them"
17. "Any Colour You Like"
18. "Brain Damage"
19. "Eclipse"
20. "Wish You Were Here"
21. "Comfortably Numb"
22. "Run Like Hell"

=== Blu-ray and DVD: 1989 Venice concert and 1990 Knebworth concert ===
First time that both of these concerts have been released in full.

Venice, 1989
Pink Floyd's performance on the Grand Canal, Venice on 15 July 1989 – the tour's penultimate show. Recorded for a live international television broadcast, hence the shortened set.

1. "Shine On You Crazy Diamond" (Part 1 intro only)
2. "Learning to Fly"
3. "Yet Another Movie"
4. "Round and Around"
5. "Sorrow" (short outro)
6. "The Dogs of War"
7. "On the Turning Away"
8. "Time"
9. "The Great Gig in the Sky"
10. "Wish You Were Here"
11. "Money"
12. "Another Brick in the Wall (Part 2)"
13. "Comfortably Numb"
14. "Run Like Hell"
15. Fireworks
  All above tracks are previously unreleased.

Knebworth, 1990
The band's headline set at the Silver Clef Award Winners Concert held at Knebworth House on 30 June 1990.

1. "Shine On You Crazy Diamond" (previously released on Knebworth – The Event 1990 VHS)
2. "The Great Gig in the Sky"
3. "Wish You Were Here"
4. "Sorrow"
5. "Money"
6. "Comfortably Numb"
7. "Run Like Hell" (previously released on Knebworth – The Event 1990 VHS)

=== Blu-ray and DVD: unreleased live films, music videos and screen films ===
All of the following is previously unreleased material. Audio in stereo only.

- Music videos
1. "Learning to Fly"
2. "Marooned"
3. "Take It Back"
4. "High Hopes"
5. "Louder Than Words"
6. "Learning to Fly" (alternate version)
- Delicate Sound of Thunder bonus tracks
1. "Yet Another Movie"
2. "Round and Around"
3. "A New Machine (Part 1)"
4. "Terminal Frost"
5. "A New Machine (Part 2)"
- 1994 tour rehearsal
1. "A Great Day for Freedom" version 1
2. "A Great Day for Freedom" version 2
3. "Lost for Words"
- Concert screen films, 1987
1. "Signs of Life"
2. "Learning to Fly"
3. "The Dogs of War"
4. "One of These Days"
5. "Speak to Me"
6. "On the Run"
7. "Us and Them"
8. "Money"
9. "Brain Damage + Eclipse"
- Concert screen films, 1994
1. "Shine On You Crazy Diamond"
2. "Speak to Me"
3. "Time"
4. "The Great Gig in the Sky"
5. "Money"
6. "Us and Them" (black and white)
7. "Us and Them" (colour)
8. "Brain Damage + Eclipse" (North America dates)
9. "Brain Damage + Eclipse" (European dates)
10. "Brain Damage + Eclipse" (London dates)
- Rock & Roll Hall of Fame induction
1. "Wish You Were Here" (with Billy Corgan)

=== Blu-ray and DVD: documentaries and unreleased material ===
- Syd Barrett tribute concert 2007
1. "Arnold Layne"
- A Momentary Lapse of Reason album cover photo shoot
- The Division Bell heads album cover photography (Ely, Cambridgeshire)
- Pulse TV advert, 1995
- The Endless River film by Ian Emes.
- A Momentary Lapse of Reason cover shoot interview with David Gilmour and Storm Thorgerson
- The Division Bell airships, 1994
- Behind the Scenes – The Division Bell tour, 1994
- Syd Barrett tribute concert rehearsal
- The Endless River launch event 2014
- The Endless River EPK 2014

=== 7-inch singles ===
Two 7-inch vinyl singles are included in the set, both with etched B-sides:

- "Arnold Layne" (Syd Barrett tribute concert, 2007)
- "Lost for Words" (1994 tour rehearsal)

=== Memorabilia ===
The set also contains:

- 60-page photo book
- Replica tour programmes
- Replica tickets
- Replica posters and stickers
- Lyric book

== The Later Years: 1987–2019 ==
The Later Years 1987–2019

Compilation album by Pink Floyd
- Released: 29 November 2019
- Recorded: 1986–2019
- Genres: Progressive rock; pop rock
- Length: 79:48
- Label: Pink Floyd Records
- Producers: Pink Floyd; Bob Ezrin

Pink Floyd also released a separate highlights compilation album, The Later Years: 1987–2019, the cover of which features a photograph shot by Aubrey Powell/Hipgnosis in 1981 in Iceland, at the Krafla geothermal power station.

1. "Shine On You Crazy Diamond" (Live at Knebworth 1990) – 11:05
2. "Marooned Jam" (unreleased 1994 recording) – 3:19
3. "One Slip" (2019 version) – 5:09
4. "Lost for Words" (1994 tour rehearsal) (Not included on CD in the box set) – 5:34
5. "Us and Them" (2019 Remix; live, from Delicate Sound of Thunder) – 7:39
6. "Comfortably Numb" (Live at Knebworth 1990; truncated) – 7:47
7. "Sorrow" (2019 version) – 8:46
8. "Learning to Fly" (Live, from Delicate Sound of Thunder) – 5:19
9. "High Hopes (Early Version)" (unreleased 1994 recording) – 6:55
10. "On the Turning Away" (2019 version) – 5:40
11. "Wish You Were Here" (Live at Knebworth 1990) – 4:47
12. "Run Like Hell" (Live, from Delicate Sound of Thunder) – 7:43

=== Charts ===
Chart (2019)	Peak position
Australian Albums (ARIA)	45
Austrian Albums (Ö3 Austria)	50
Belgian Albums (Ultratop Flanders)	30
Belgian Albums (Ultratop Wallonia)	23
Czech Albums (ČNS IFPI)	9
Dutch Albums (Album Top 100)	31
French Albums (SNEP)	40
German Albums (Offizielle Top 100)	18
Hungarian Albums (MAHASZ)	5
Italian Albums (FIMI)	10
Norwegian Albums (VG-lista)	17
Polish Albums (ZPAV)	38
Portuguese Albums (AFP)	10
Scottish Albums (Official Charts)	20
Spanish Albums (PROMUSICAE)	24
Swiss Albums (Schweizer Hitparade)	10
UK Albums (Official Charts)	32
US Billboard 200	197

Chart (2025)	Peak position
Greek Albums (IFPI)	80

== Certifications ==
Region	Certification	Certified units/sales
United Kingdom (BPI)	Silver	60,000^{‡}
^{‡} Sales+streaming figures based on certification alone.
