= One Slip =

Single by Pink Floyd

from the album A Momentary Lapse of Reason
- B-side: "Terminal Frost" / "The Dogs of War" (live)
- Released: 13 June 1988
- Recorded: Early 1987
- Genre: Progressive rock; synth-pop
- Length: 5:10 (album version); 3:58 (single edit)
- Label: EMI (UK); Columbia (US)
- Songwriters: David Gilmour; Phil Manzanera
- Producers: Bob Ezrin; David Gilmour

Pink Floyd singles chronology
| "The Dogs of War" (1988) | "One Slip" (1988) | "Keep Talking" (1994) |

Audio
- "One Slip" on YouTube

"One Slip" is a song from Pink Floyd's thirteenth studio album A Momentary Lapse of Reason (1987).

== Composition ==
The album gets its title from a line of this song's lyrics. The song was co-written by David Gilmour and Roxy Music guitarist Phil Manzanera, who later co-produced Gilmour's On an Island album and played rhythm guitar on the subsequent tour.

== Release ==
It was first released as the B-side to "Learning to Fly". It was then re-released as the third single from the album in the UK where it was a minor hit and was the fourth single from the album in the US where it did well. Peaking at no. 5 on the Billboard Mainstream Rock Tracks chart.

"One Slip (2019 remix)" from the box set, The Later Years 1987–2019 was released as a single on 24 October 2019 on Spotify and 25 October 2019 on YouTube and iTunes. The song contains newly recorded drums by Nick Mason and organ parts by Richard Wright lifted from 1987-89 live performances, replacing the song's original drum and keyboard parts.

== Live ==
The track was the final song from the album played live when it was the first encore on the Momentary Lapse of Reason tour from 1987–89. The band resurrected the track on one show on their 1994 The Division Bell tour when the band performed it in Oakland, California.

== Video ==
The video for the track is footage of a vintage 1930s plane flying interspersed with concert clips filmed during the band's three night run at The Omni in Atlanta, Georgia. The live footage was shot in November 1987 and was directed by Larry Jordan (who has directed concert films for Rush, Mariah Carey and Billy Joel). Videos for "On the Turning Away" and "The Dogs of War" were also filmed from this concert.

== Personnel ==
- David Gilmour – guitars, vocals, sequencer
- Nick Mason – percussion

Additional musicians:

- Bob Ezrin – keyboards
- Jon Carin – keyboards
- Tony Levin – Chapman Stick
- Jim Keltner – drums
- Michael Landau – guitars (delay part on the opening parts of "One Slip")
- Darlene Koldenhoven – backing vocals
- Carmen Twillie – backing vocals
- Phyllis St. James – backing vocals
- Donny Gerrard – backing vocals

Oakland Stadium, California on 24 April 1994 and Delicate Sound of Thunder version

- David Gilmour – lead vocals, guitar
- Nick Mason – drums
- Richard Wright – keyboards

Additional musicians:

- Guy Pratt – bass
- Jon Carin – keyboards, backing vocals

Margret Taylor - backing vocals (Delicate Sound)

- Rachel Fury - backing vocals (Delicate Sound)
- Sam Brown – backing vocals (1994)
- Durga McBroom – backing vocals
- Claudia Fontaine – backing vocals (Oakland)
- Tim Renwick – guitar
- Gary Wallis – percussion
- Scott Page - rhythm guitar (Delicate Sound)
