= Signs of Life (instrumental) =

Instrumental by Pink Floyd

from the album A Momentary Lapse of Reason
- Released: 7 September 1987
- Recorded: 1987
- Genre: Progressive rock; instrumental rock; new age
- Length: 4:23
- Label: EMI (UK); Columbia (US)
- Songwriters: David Gilmour; Bob Ezrin
- Producers: Bob Erzin; David Gilmour

Audio
- "Signs Of Life" on YouTube

"Signs of Life" is the opening track on A Momentary Lapse of Reason, the first Pink Floyd album headed by David Gilmour, in the absence of ex-member Roger Waters.

== Music ==
It is an instrumental piece, the only words being the electronically processed voice of drummer Nick Mason, who can briefly be heard reciting two verses of an unknown poem. To open the track, producer Bob Ezrin recorded the sound of David Gilmour's boatman, Langley Iddins, rowing across the Thames. The screen film used to accompany the piece during concert performances featured Iddins rowing through Grantchester Meadows.

The track is Pink Floyd's first instrumental piece (excluding the live-only "The Last Few Bricks") since 1973's "Any Colour You Like", from The Dark Side of the Moon. Its roots go back to the 1970s.

Part Two of "Signs of Life" was actually done in 1977, I think. The guitar and the whistling answers was actually a demo that I did in '77 or '78. We had to replace the actual guitar, but the backing chords are from an ancient thing I did. Most of the rest of it was written within the past two years.

— David Gilmour, Creem magazine (Feb. 1988)

The song segues directly into "Learning to Fly". "Signs of Life" ends on an E minor chord, while "Learning to Fly" opens with the relative major G major.

A live recording has been released as part of the concert film Delicate Sound of Thunder. The accompanying live album did not include the track until the 2019 remix, which contains the entire live setlist.

The piece is shortened on all official releases of Delicate Sound of Thunder. On the 2019 album and video version, parts of Mason's spoken vocal were re-inserted into the track even if live recordings from the tour show that it was not part of the original concerts.

== Personnel ==
Pink Floyd

- David Gilmour – electric guitar, synthesizer, programming
- Nick Mason – spoken words

Additional musicians:

- Richard Wright – Kurzweil synthesizer
- Bob Ezrin – sequencer, sound effects
- Jon Carin – synthesizer
