= Terminal Frost =

Single by Pink Floyd

from the album A Momentary Lapse of Reason
- A-side: "Learning to Fly"
- Released: 14 September 1987
- Recorded: 1987
- Genre: Progressive rock, instrumental rock
- Length: 6:17 (album version); 6:01 (single edit)
- Label: EMI (UK); Columbia (US)
- Songwriter: David Gilmour
- Producers: Bob Ezrin; David Gilmour

Pink Floyd singles chronology
"Not Now John" (1983)	"Learning to Fly" / "Terminal Frost" (1987)	"On the Turning Away" (1987)

Audio
- "Terminal Frost" on YouTube

"Terminal Frost" is an instrumental from Pink Floyd's 1987 album, A Momentary Lapse of Reason.

== Recording ==
The saxophones are played by Tom Scott and John Helliwell, the latter best known for his work with Supertramp. The track is bookended by "A New Machine (Part 1)" and "A New Machine (Part 2)" which creates a mini-suite on the album. The sequence of "A New Machine (Part 1) - Terminal Frost - A New Machine (Part 2)" were the only tracks from the album which were not performed at every show of the A Momentary Lapse of Reason Tour, frequently being dropped. David Gilmour has said that "Terminal Frost" is the oldest piece on the album, having been written many years before.

== Personnel ==
Pink Floyd

- David Gilmour – electric guitar, acoustic guitar, programming
- Nick Mason – electronic drums

Additional musicians:

- Richard Wright – piano, Kurzweil synthesiser, Hammond organ
- Bob Ezrin – programming, keyboards, percussion
- Jon Carin – keyboards, synthesizers
- Tony Levin – bass guitar
- Tom Scott – soprano saxophone
- John Helliwell – saxophone
- Darlene Koldenhoven (as Darlene Koldenhaven) – backing vocals
- Carmen Twillie – backing vocals
- Phyllis St. James – backing vocals
- Donny Gerrard – backing vocals
