= La Carrera Panamericana =

1992 film

- VHS cover of La Carrera Panamericana
- Directed by: Ian McArthur
- Produced by: Ian McArthur; Steve O'Rourke
- Starring: David Gilmour; Nick Mason
- Music by: Pink Floyd
- Distributed by: Sony Music Video (SMV) Enterprises; Picture Music International
- Release date: 2 June 1992
- Running time: 65 min.
- Language: English

La Carrera Panamericana is a 1992 video of the Carrera Panamericana automobile race in Mexico. The film was directed by Ian McArthur, and included a soundtrack entirely of music by the band Pink Floyd, as the band's guitarist David Gilmour, drummer Nick Mason and manager Steve O'Rourke competed in the race in 1991. The film had been broadcast on BBC2 on 24 December 1991.

During the course of the race, Gilmour crashed, and while he was unharmed, Steve O'Rourke (his map-reader and Pink Floyd's manager) suffered a broken leg. Mason finished eighth overall with his co-driver, English auto racer Valentine Lindsay.

== Music ==
La Carrera Panamericana

Soundtrack album by Pink Floyd
- Released: Unreleased
- Recorded: November 1991
- Studio: Olympic Studios
- Genre: Progressive rock
- Length: 53:28 (total time of used songs)
- Producer: David Gilmour

Pink Floyd soundtracks chronology
Pink Floyd – The Wall (1982)	La Carrera Panamericana (Unreleased)

The music is a combination of previously released Pink Floyd material (re-edited into a soundtrack) and material composed for the video. The tracks composed for the video are the first studio recordings made after Richard Wright re-joined the band in 1990. The new studio recordings were produced by Gilmour and engineered by Andy Jackson. The songs "Pan Am Shuffle" and "Carrera Slow Blues" are notable as the first tracks co-written by Wright since 1975's Wish You Were Here, as well as the first co-written by Mason since 1973's The Dark Side of the Moon.

A soundtrack album was not released, but the tracks are available on the A Tree Full of Secrets bootleg recording.

== Track listing ==
All tracks written by David Gilmour, except where noted.

=== Previously recorded ===
- "Signs of Life" (Gilmour/Ezrin) – 4:24
- "Yet Another Movie" (Gilmour/Leonard) – 6:13
- "Sorrow" – 8:46
- "One Slip" (Gilmour/Manzanera) – 5:08
- "Run Like Hell (live)" (Gilmour/Waters) – 0:49

=== Original material ===
New material was recorded at Olympic Studios in November 1991.

- "Country Theme" – 2:01
- "Small Theme" – 7:23
- "Big Theme" – 4:10
- "Carrera Slow Blues" (Gilmour/Wright/Mason) – 2:20
- "Mexico '78" – 4:05
- "Pan Am Shuffle" (Gilmour/Wright/Mason) – 8:09
