= Bill Page =

American musician

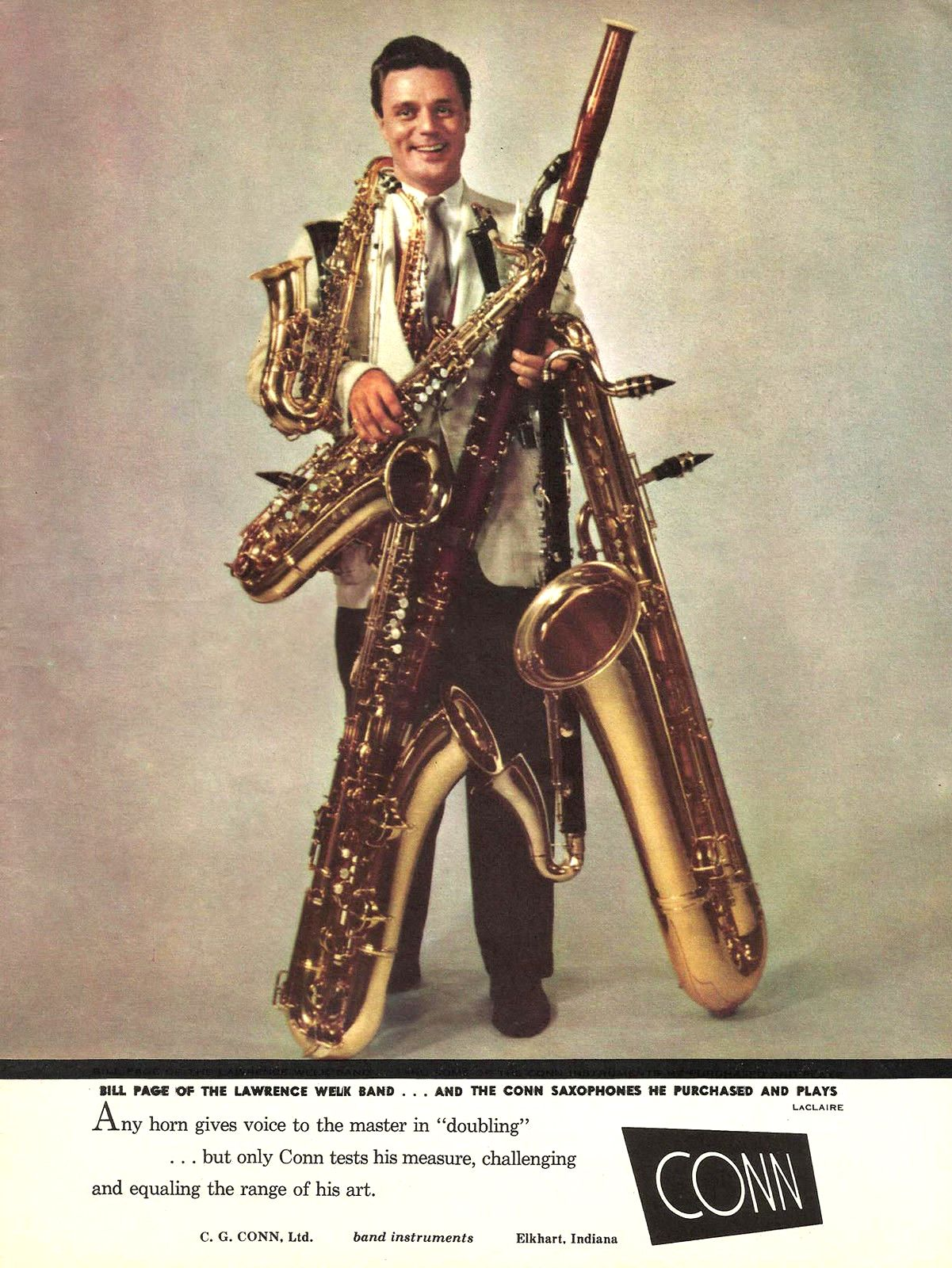

Background information
- Born: September 11, 1925; Chicago, Illinois, U.S.
- Died: April 26, 2017 (aged 91) Studio City, Los Angeles, California, U.S.
- Genres: Big band, classical, jazz, orchestra
- Occupations: Instrumentalist, band leader, entrepreneur
- Instruments: English horn, bass clarinet, bassoon, clarinet, flute, oboe, piccolo, saxophone

Bill Page (September 11, 1925 – April 26, 2017) was an American reed player, band leader, and entrepreneur who was best known for his work in the Lawrence Welk Band.

== Early life ==
Page is a World War II veteran of the European theater, serving in the US Army. He attended Wright Junior College (now known as Wilbur Wright College).

== Early musical career ==
Page played with Del Courtney and Boyd Raeburn before joining the Lawrence Welk Show in 1951.

== Lawrence Welk Show ==
1950s newspapers give differing total numbers of woodwind instruments he could play, but among them were six saxophones, four clarinets, flute, piccolo, oboe, English horn and bassoon. He was often featured in numbers in which he played several instruments accompanied by Welk's orchestra. On the 26 October 1957 broadcast, Welk boasted that Page could play "sixteen" instruments, with Page then playing the 1951 song "Am I In Love?" on eleven of them.

== After the Lawrence Welk Show ==
Page left the Lawrence Welk Show in 1965 and went on to perform with Barry Manilow, Ted Mack, Frank Gorshin, Judy Garland, and on the Tonight Show with Johnny Carson.

== Personal life ==
Page would eventually settle permanently in Studio City, California. He is the father of musician and entrepreneur Scott Page of Pink Floyd, Supertramp, and Toto fame and host on syndicated radio show Business Rockstars, as well as Tanya Page, an executive at Sony.

Page died on April 26, 2017, at the age of 91.
