= Scott Page =

American musician

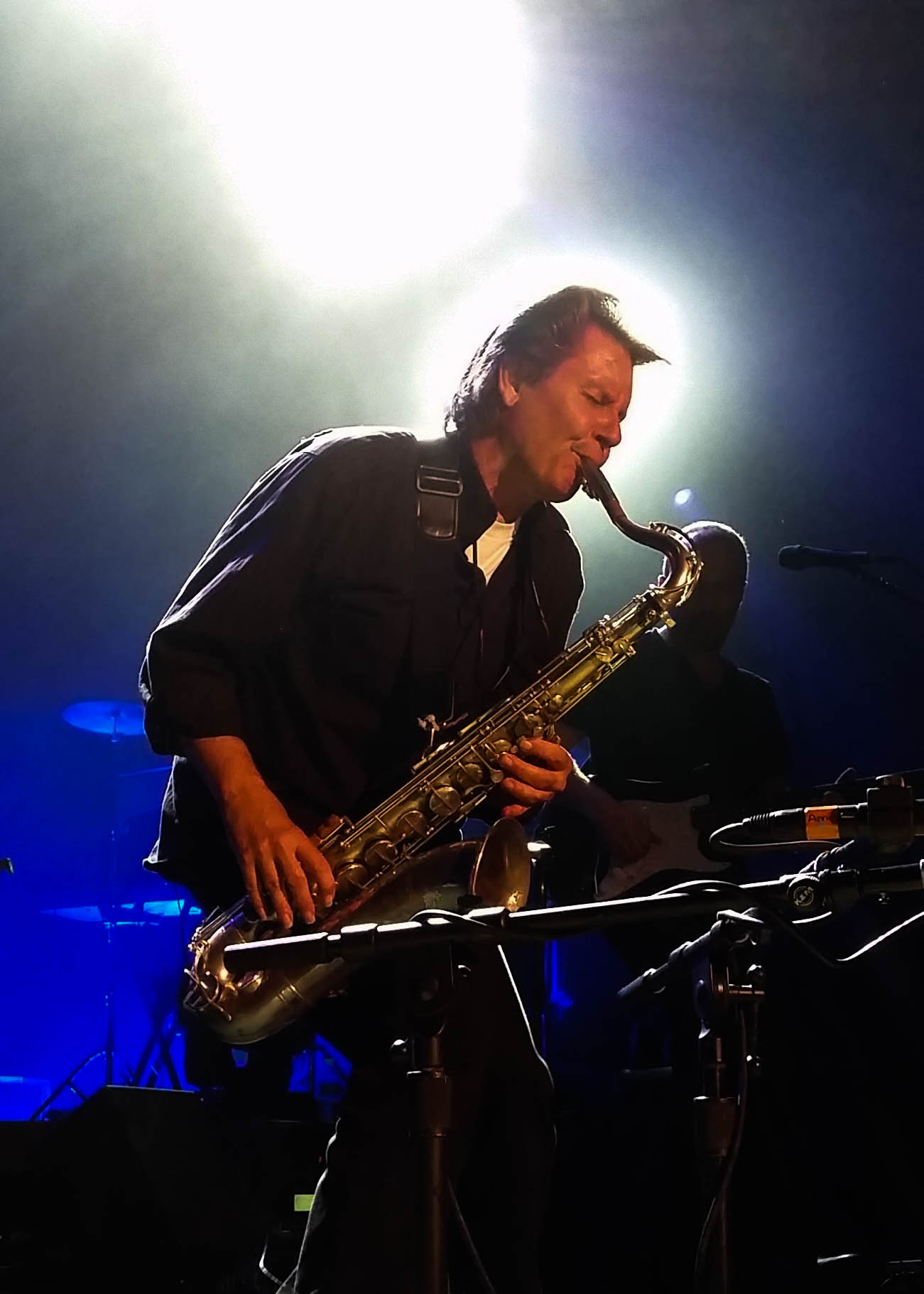
- Page in 2015

Background information
- Genres: Rock; blues; funk; R&B
- Occupations: Technologist; entrepreneur; musician; songwriter
- Instruments: Saxophone; guitar; flute; percussion; vocals
- Years active: 1960–present
- Formerly of: Pink Floyd; Supertramp; Toto

Scott Page is an American musician, technologist and entrepreneur known for his saxophone and rhythm guitar work with Pink Floyd, Supertramp and Toto.

== Career ==
Page worked on and led Walt Tucker Productions, an audio-video post-production company that produced projects for The Rolling Stones, Bon Jovi, Janet Jackson, Garth Brooks, Scorpions and many others.

Page co-founded 7th Level, Inc., a CD-ROM game and educational software company where he co-produced Tuneland, an interactive musical cartoon, as well as the Monty Python interactive series.

Page was involved in the development of QD7, an interactive multimedia joint venture with Quincy Jones and David Salzman that resulted from Jones' partnering with the company.

Page co-founded New Media Broadcasting Company, a social media and collaborative communications enterprise and co-founded and was CEO of Direct2Care, an online healthcare presence management company.

Page co-founded GetYourOPI, an online presence management company and was CEO of Ignited Network, "a start up music accelerator based in Los Angeles."

Currently, Page is CEO of a Los Angeles-based media company focused on live immersive entertainment called Think:EXP.

As a musician, Page continued his work as a recording and as a session musician with the band Hang Dynasty .

== Early life ==
Scott Page is the son of musician Bill Page, best known for his work as a reed player and member of the Lawrence Welk Band. He was also a fixture with The Tonight Show Starring Johnny Carson.

Scott Page's earliest nationally broadcast musical performance was on television network American Broadcasting Company's (ABC's) Lawrence Welk Show; he played trumpet, in an appearance with his father, Bill Page, on the December 24th, 1960 Christmas special (season 5, episode 15).

== Acting career ==
As a young adult, Page was cast in The Hardy Boys/Nancy Drew Mysteries and in The Young and the Restless. Page was featured in the April 10th, 1977 The Hardy Boys/Nancy Drew Mysteries episode titled "The Mystery of the Flying Courier," playing the part of a musician in character Joe Hardy's band. On The Young and the Restless he played a musician, a band member alongside characters Lauren Fenmore and Danny Romalotti's band; the episode aired on May 14, 1986.

== Music ==
Following his musical performances on the Lawrence Welk Show as a child, Page played in studio projects for Geronimo Black and The Alpha Band in his early adult years. Page played oboe on the self-titled Geronimo Black album. He came to greater prominence when he worked on Supertramp's 1983 tour following the release of the album ...Famous Last Words.... Page would then go on to record with Supertramp on their 1985 album Brother Where You Bound, playing flute. That production would become his first artistic intersection with Pink Floyd guitarist and vocalist David Gilmour, who also played on the album.

=== Supertramp ===
Scott Page joined Supertramp in support of the ...Famous Last Words... Tour. It marked the first time additional musicians would join Supertramp as touring band members. The tour also featured Fred Mandel among the added personnel. During that tour, Scott Page was also occasionally playing the guitar and the flute.

In addition to his instrumental work on the tour, Page provided vocals, e.g., on the live version of the hit It's Raining Again, John Helliwell and Page sang the lower harmonies while Roger Hodgson sang higher harmonies.

Page's tenure with Supertramp was embedded in a transitional period for the band. The tour marked the first time Hodgson spoke to the audience during shows, thanking fans and announcing his forthcoming departure from the band. It was Supertramp's most ambitious tour, filling stadiums around the world and elevating Page's status as a recognizable figure in his own right.

Following the successful ... Famous Last Words ... Tour, Page stayed with Supertramp, entering the studio with the band and performing live with them through the album and tour for Brother Where You Bound (1985-1986). He then did studio work on the follow-up album, Free as a Bird (1987).

During that time, Page was also balancing work with Toto.

=== Toto ===
In 1985 Scott Page had the opportunity to tour with Toto (between the end of Supertramp's ... Famous Last Words ... Tour and the band's return to the studio for work on Brother Where You Bound). This was a promotional tour for Toto's album Isolation. The 1985 leg of the tour spanned February through May of that year and two dates in April 1986.

In 1986, Page was approached by Pink Floyd's David Gilmour for work on an upcoming album by the band's new incarnation following Roger Waters' departure in 1985. He was invited to record parts for what would become the track "Dogs of War" on the A Momentary Lapse of Reason album. He would eventually be asked to join the band on its extensive A Momentary Lapse of Reason Tour, marking the end of his stints with Toto and Supertramp.

=== Pink Floyd ===
As Pink Floyd prepared for their first tour in a new incarnation, Gilmour and drummer Nick Mason began looking for musicians who could add a combination of musical skills and "showmanship" in an effort to put across more energy in the band's stage show. Page was hired and immediately joined the band in Toronto, Ontario, Canada for rehearsals. Page played for the duration of the A Momentary Lapse of Reason Tour with the exception of the band's last performance under that tour's umbrella: an isolated, special performance at Knebworth Park on June 30, 1990. Despite being cast as part of the A Momentary Lapse of Reason Tour, the Knebworth Park date took place nearly one year after the preceding tour date and included a number of guest musicians that were not part of the band's regular recording and touring team.

Mason referred to Scott Page as "another stage show in his own right." Page "would be rendered instantly recognizable to fans in even the cheapest stadium seats by his lavish mullet hairstyle." As Pink Floyd historian Mark Blake illustrates in Pigs Might Fly: The Inside Story of Pink Floyd, the band was specifically looking to add "the presence of younger and more flamboyant band members" and Page was a good fit with his "elaborately coiffured" look and a willingness to participate to the fullest extent possible in the band's live performance (often adding the texture of an additional rhythm guitar between saxophone performances). Producer Bob Ezrin would later state that Page "came with the territory” as the band meant for it "to be a more visual show."

He is featured in the television documentary and live concert Pink Floyd in Venice and the Pink Floyd Delicate Sound of Thunder concert film, both which document the band's A Momentary Lapse of Reason Tour. Delicate Sound of Thunder was also released as an album.

Page is also featured in additional recordings that were originally intended for release in what would have become the Delicate Sound of Thunder concert film and Delicate Sound of Thunder live album, including live material from Atlanta, Georgia, recorded at the Omni Coliseum in November 1987. Unhappy with the results, the band used footage recorded the following year at Nassau Coliseum in Long Island, New York for what would become Delicate Sound of Thunder: the abandoned Atlanta material circulates widely as a video and an audio bootleg titled Pink Floyd: The Calhoun Tapes and Would You Buy a Ticket to This Show. Another performance that circulated as a bootleg version and was finally released officially in 2019 as part of The Later Years is the live Italian and worldwide broadcast of the band's performance on a barge, on the Grand Canal in Venice in July 1989.

It was during his time in Pink Floyd that Page started transitioning into entrepreneurial endeavors and began to divide his time between his music and his business careers.

=== Post-Pink Floyd music career ===
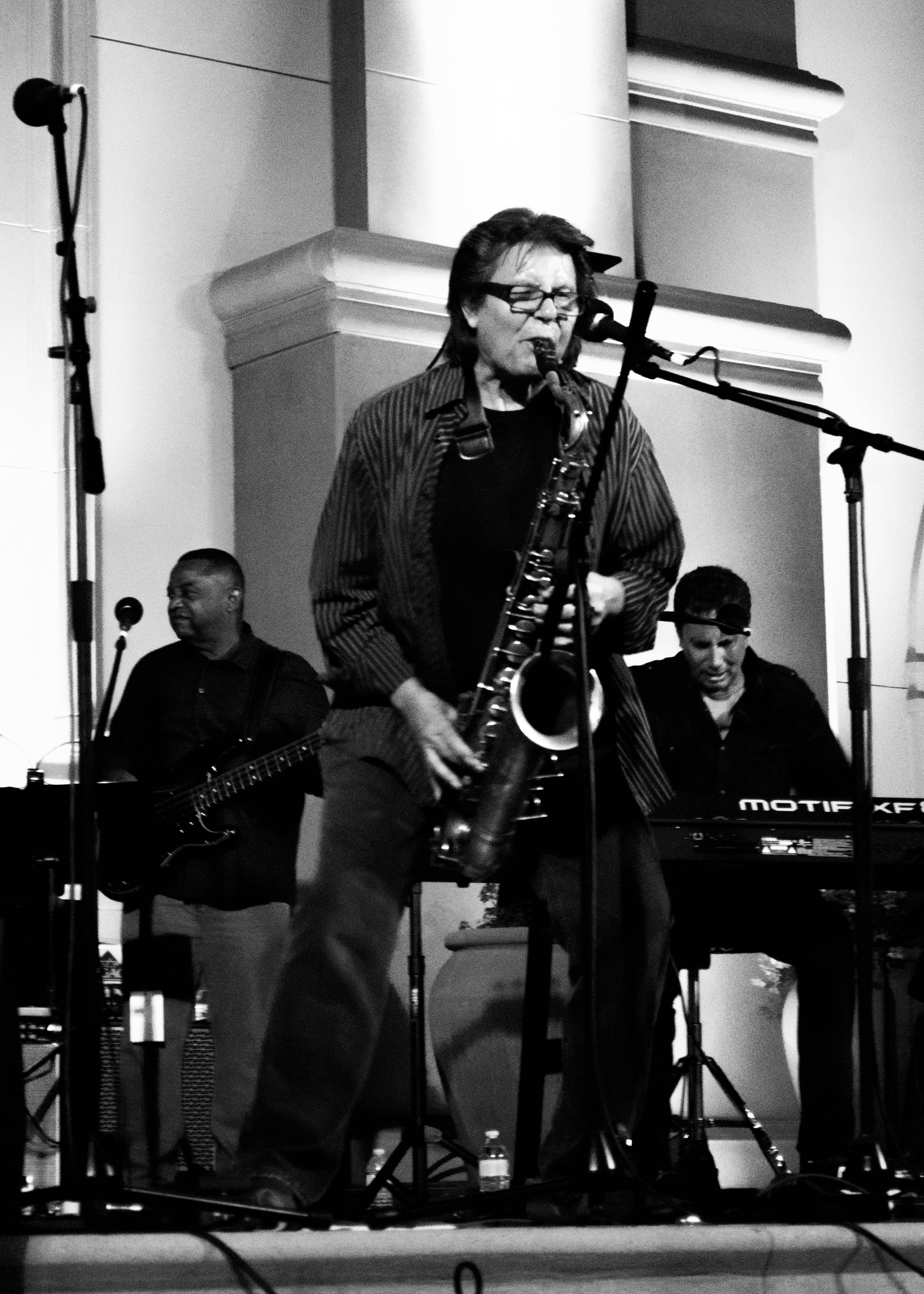
Page, performing at the Temecula Valley International Film Festival with Hang Dynasty in 2014.

Despite his current focus on business endeavors, Page continues to play live and as a session musician. After his tenure with Pink Floyd, Page has continued recording with artists as diverse as David Cassidy, Gorky Park, Bob Malone, Eddie Zip, Mickey Raphael, David Lee Roth, Jane's Addiction, and Seth Loveless; he has also played as a guest on a number of Pink Floyd tribute albums.

Along with Supertramp member Carl Verheyen, he is also a founding member of Hang Dynasty, a band that brings together "sidemen" from larger bands and whose membership includes a rotating cast of musicians. In addition to Page and Verheyen, musicians who play or have performed with the band include Jeff Baxter, Ray Brinker, Kal David, Mike Finnigan, Steve Madaio, Ricky Peterson, Leland Sklar, Edgar Winter, Dave Woodford, Kenny Lee Lewis, Billy Peterson, Stephen Kupka and Lee Thornburg. The band has also performed with guests musicians including Kenny Aronoff, Reggie McBride and Dianne Steinberg-Lewis.

In September 2014, Hang Dynasty headlined the final night of the Temecula Valley International Film Festival. The band's special guest was honoree Alan Parsons.

On June 17, 2015, Page made a surprise guest appearance during Brit Floyd's concert at the Orpheum Theatre in Los Angeles, California. He played Money and Us and Them with Brit Floyd during his guest appearance. He would make another guest appearance during another concert from the tribute band at The Greek Theatre on July 10, 2026.

== Business: technologist and entrepreneurship ==
Through his various business and artistic ventures, Page has served as a video game music producer for the Ace Ventura video game and The Lion King franchise's Timon & Pumbaa's Jungle Games video game, as a composer for the movie Three Kinds of Heat, and as a supervising producer for Monty Python's Complete Waste of Time video game.

=== Walt Tucker Productions ===
Although Page made a fuller transition into technology entrepreneurship in the computer software industry in 1993 (after founding 7th Level), effectively culminating any potential commitments with Pink Floyd, he had already founded a Los Angeles based audio and video post-production company in 1987 called Walt Tucker Productions (specifically, headquartered in Glendale, California). He led and managed Walt Tucker Productions even while recording and touring with Pink Floyd. The two efforts overlapped during production of the "A Momentary Lapse of Reason" album and the subsequent, promotional A Momentary Lapse of Reason Tour. Walt Tucker specialized in CD/ROM technology and derived its name from an amalgamation of two of Page's "heroes": Walt Disney and Preston Tucker.

A few years into his tenure as president of Walt Tucker Productions, during a visit to COMDEX in the fall of 1992, Page talked about being at a crossroads with respect to the balance he was beginning to strike between his role as a musician and his role as an entrepreneur and businessman. In an interview with Joseph Panettieri, of Information Week, Page discussed "getting to a point where [he would] have to make a decision about what [he wanted] to dedicate [his] time to." He added: "I've done my music stint. Building an interactive multimedia company is my next challenge. I'm more concerned now about the multimedia business." Despite this, he would also state that (at the time) Pink Floyd may commit to another world tour and that he would find it difficult to "sit that... out."

A special Pink Floyd performance at Knebworth Park on June 30, 1990 (in Stevenage, England) included a number of guest musicians that were not part of the band's regular recording and touring roster. At this event, which is considered the band's last performance on the A Momentary Lapse of Reason Tour, Candy Dulfer played saxophone. Pink Floyd would not tour again until 1994, at which point Page was fully immersed in business endeavors and limiting his music work to studio sessions and some selected live performances. Ultimately, this would cement Page's performance with Pink Floyd on the penultimate date of the A Momentary Lapse of Reason Tour (July 18, of 1989) in Marseille, France, at the Stade Vélodrome, as his last with the band. Saxophonist Dick Parry, who had last recorded with Pink Floyd in 1975, during the Wish You Were Here album production effort and last toured with the band in 1977 during the In The Flesh Tour, rejoined the band for the recording of The Division Bell album as well as The Division Bell Tour that followed.

Page's new focus on entrepreneurship did not mean an end to his partnership with members of the Pink Floyd coterie: Page continued working with Walt Tucker Productions until joining forces with Pink Floyd producer Bob Ezrin to create a new business venture in 1993.

=== 7th Level ===
In 1993, Page formed 7th Level, Inc. with music/entertainment producer Bob Ezrin and Dallas, Texas technology entrepreneur George Grayson, whose first company (Micrografx, Inc.) pioneered PC-based graphics software development in the early 1980's. The company's first software venture was an edutainment product called "Li'l Howie's TuneLand" starring comedian and "Deal Or No Deal" host Howie Mandel. "Tuneland" featured musical performances by Pink Floyd guitarist David Gilmour, Yes vocalist/songwriter Jon Anderson, Steely Dan/Doobie Brothers guitarist Jeff 'Skunk' Baxter and other popular musicians on such children's songs as "The Little Green Frog."

7th Level's flagship product was a CD-ROM software 'edutainment thingie' called "Monty Python's Complete Waste of Time." It was produced in 1994 by British comedy troupe's animator and award-winning film director Terry Gilliam, and Ezrin. "Waste Of Time" included such elements as 'The Desktop Pythonizer' and 'Solve The Secret To Intergalactic Success.' The product included video clips from the absurdist icons' seminal BBC-TV series "Monty Python's Flying Circus" as well as new animation from Gilliam.

=== New Media Broadcasting Company ===
In 2004, Page launched New Media Broadcasting Company Inc. (NewMBC) www.newmbc.com with silicon valley technology veteran Russ Lujan. Initially NewMBC developed interactive distribution services for content creators and consumers. Its MashCast communications platform connected diverse audiences, artists, content owners through a collaborative online network. Mashcast helped users integrate and monetize Internet broadcasts and social networks, using an infrastructure that supported content creation and collaboration. NewMBC's most highly visible clients have included fan-based community sites for the international, Grammy-winning musical group Toto, as well as for Python (Monty) Ltd.

=== Direct2Care ===
In 2011, Page launched and was chief executive officer of Direct2Care, an online healthcare presence management company. Direct2Care shared traits with New Media Broadcasting Company in its effort to leverage website and social media presence for its clients: it provided a "social business and presence management network for healthcare professionals."

=== GetYourOPI ===
In 2014 Page launched GetYourOPI, an online presence management company: an endeavor focused on improving cyberspace presence for individuals and entities through analysis of their existing results on search engines. GetYourOPI "measures" and "manages" capabilities for these. This "online presence" is measured by the company through an index factoring the volume of cyberspace presence and its translation into "social influence," producing a score whereby the company tackles its management consultation. It provides its clients with a "track, manage, and follow" service that expands their ability to control what they project online with greater scrutiny.

== Philanthropy ==
In November 1992 Page created "The Grand Scientific Musical Theater," a multimedia concert and fundraiser held in Las Vegas, Nevada to benefit the National Center for Missing and Exploited Children. The event raised more than $1.5 million.

== Discography ==
With Supertramp

- Brother Where You Bound (1985)
- Free as a Bird (1987)
- The Story So Far... (1990)

With Pink Floyd

- A Momentary Lapse of Reason (1987)
- Delicate Sound of Thunder (1989)
- Shine On (1992)
- Oh, by the Way (2007)
- Discovery (2011)
- The Later Years (2019)

With other artists

- Geronimo Black - Geronimo Black (1972)
- The Alpha Band - The Statue Makers of Hollywood (1978)
- Ladd McIntosh Big Band - Energy (1982)
- Roger Hodgson - In the Eye of the Storm (1984)
- Bob Siebenberg - Giants in Our Own Room (1986)
- Earl Thomas Conley - Too Many Times (1986)
- Various - Stairway to Heaven/Highway to Hell (1989)
- David Cassidy - Didn't You Used to Be... (1992)
- Gorky Park - Moscow Calling (1992)
- Bob Malone - Bob Malone (1999)
- Eddie Zip - New Orleans Live in Hollywood (2001)
- Mickey Raphael - Hand to Mouth (2001)
- David Lee Roth - Diamond Dave (2003)
- Jane's Addiction - Strays (2003)
- The Pink Floyd Tribute Band - Breathe: A Tribute to Pink Floyd (2004)
- Various - Return to the Dark Side of the Moon: A Tribute to Pink Floyd (2005)
- The Pink Floyd Tribute Band - Breathe: A Tribute to Pink Floyd (2005)
- Giorgio - Party of the Century (2010)
- Various - A Collection of Delicate Diamonds: A Tribute to Pink Floyd (2011)
- Seth Loveless - Seth Loveless (2014)

== Sources ==
- Pink Floyd - A Momentary Lapse of Reason Songbook (1st US paperback ed.). Music Sales America. 1992. ISBN 9780711913400. Archived from the original on 2016-01-31.
- Supertramp: The Story So Far... (DVD). A&M. March 26, 2002.
- Blake, Mark (2008). Comfortably Numb: The Inside Story of Pink Floyd (1st US paperback ed.). Da Capo Press. ISBN 978-0-306-81752-6.
- Caffey, Michael (Director) (April 10, 1977). The Hardy Boys/Nancy Drew Mysteries (Television series). Los Angeles: Glen A. Larson Productions (co-production) University Television (co-production).
- Hobson, James (Director) (December 24, 1960). Lawrence Welk Show (Television series). Los Angeles: Teleklew Productions (1955-1982) American Broadcasting Company (ABC) (1955-1971) (co-production).
- Mason, Nick (2005). Inside Out: A Personal History of Pink Floyd (1st US paperback ed.). Chronicle Books. ISBN 978-0-8118-4824-4.
- Pacelli, Frank (Director) (May 14, 1986). The Young and the Restless (Television series). Los Angeles: CBS.
- Povey, Glen (2008). Echoes: The Complete History of Pink Floyd (2nd UK paperback ed.). 3C Publishing Ltd. ISBN 978-0-9554624-1-2. Archived from the original on 2023-01-13.
- Schaffner, Nicholas (1991). Saucerful of Secrets: the Pink Floyd Odyssey (1st US paperback ed.). Dell Publishing. ISBN 978-0-385-30684-3.
