= The Dogs of War (song) =

Promotional single by Pink Floyd

from the album A Momentary Lapse of Reason
- B-side: "On the Turning Away (Live)"
- Released: 8 September 1987
- Recorded: November – December 1986
- Genre: Progressive rock; blues rock
- Length: 6:11
- Label: CBS
- Songwriters: David Gilmour; Anthony Moore
- Producers: Bob Ezrin; David Gilmour

Pink Floyd singles chronology
| "On the Turning Away" (1987) | "The Dogs of War" (1987) | "One Slip" (1988) |

Audio
- "The Dogs of War" on YouTube

"The Dogs of War" is a song by the English rock band Pink Floyd from their thirteenth studio album, A Momentary Lapse of Reason (1987). It was released as a promotional single from the album. Live versions have an extended intro, an extended middle solo for the saxophone, a guitar and sax duel and a longer outro as compared to the album version. The track was a minor rock radio hit in the US, reaching #16 on MTV's Video Countdown in May 1988 and No. 30 on the Mainstream Rock charts.

"The Dogs of War" describes politicians orchestrating wars, suggesting the major influence behind war is money.

== Composition ==
Musically, the song follows a twelve-bar blues structure in C minor, only with significantly different chord changes. A standard blues song in C minor would progress as Cm, Fm, Cm, G (major or minor), Fm, and back to Cm. "The Dogs of War", instead, progresses in this way: Cm, E♭m, Cm, A♭^{7}, Fm, and back to Cm. All minor chords include the seventh.

Lead vocalist David Gilmour often approaches the C minor chord by singing on the diminished fifth, G♭, before descending to the fourth, minor third, and root. This melody is also compatible with the next chord, E♭m in which G♭ is the minor third. It also appears in the A♭^{7} chord, as the dominant seventh.

The majority of the song is in a slow 12/8 time. After a bluesy guitar solo, the song switches to a fast 4/4 tempo for the saxophone solo. This is not unlike what happens in "Money", a minor-key blues-based song from The Dark Side of the Moon (1973), in which a saxophone solos over the song's predominant 7/4 tempo before switching to a faster 4/4 tempo for the guitar solo. "The Dogs of War" also imitates "Money" in its ending sequence, with a "call and response" between Gilmour's voice and his guitar.

== Music video ==
The music video for the track composed of the backdrop film directed by Storm Thorgerson which depicted German Shepherds with yellow eyes running through a war zone plus a live recording and concert footage filmed during the band's three night run at The Omni in Atlanta, Georgia in November 1987 directed by Lawrence Jordan (who has directed concert films for Rush, Mariah Carey and Billy Joel). Videos for "On the Turning Away" and "One Slip" were also filmed at this concert.

== Personnel on studio version ==
Pink Floyd

- David Gilmour – guitar, vocals

Additional musicians

- Jon Carin – keyboards
- Tony Levin – bass guitar
- Carmine Appice – drums
- Bill Payne – Hammond organ
- Scott Page – tenor saxophone
- Tom Scott – saxophone
- Darlene Koldenhoven – backing vocals
- Carmen Twillie – backing vocals
- Phyllis St. James – backing vocals
- Donny Gerrard – backing vocals

== Personnel on live versions ==
Pink Floyd

- David Gilmour – lead guitar, lead vocals and vocalisations
- Nick Mason – drums and percussion
- Richard Wright – organ and synthesizer

with

- Guy Pratt – bass guitar
- Tim Renwick – rhythm guitar
- Jon Carin – keyboards and effects
- Gary Wallis – percussion
- Scott Page – tenor saxophone
- Margret Taylor, Rachel Fury, Durga McBroom, Roberta Freeman (video version) and Lorelei McBroom (video version) – backing vocals

== Cover version ==
The Slovenian and Yugoslav avant-garde music group Laibach covered the song on their studio album, NATO (1994).

== See also ==
- List of anti-war songs
- One World or None (1946)
