= Tuneland =

1993 video game

- Developer(s): 7th Level
- Producer(s): George Grayson (Executive); Bob Ezrin (Executive); Richard Merrick; Scott Page
- Designer(s): Scott Page
- Platform(s): MS-DOS
- Release: 1993
- Genre(s): Educational
- Mode(s): Single-player

Tuneland is a musical educational video game for children published in 1993 by a division of 7th Level, Kids' World Entertainment. The cartoon game follows the character Little Howie, who is voiced by the television personality Howie Mandel on an adventure around Old McDonald's Farm.

Tuneland was followed by the Lil' Howie series: Lil' Howie's Great Word Adventure, Lil' Howie's Great Math Adventure, and Lil' Howie's Great Reading Adventure. The series has won 36 awards.

== Gameplay ==
The game using a point and click interface to move around the locations. There are also hotspots to trigger animations. The eight locations in the game are the barnyard, the farmhouse, the barn, the pond, grandma's house, the train station, the mountain, and the valley.

== Audio ==
The game contains around 40 songs, which are primarily nursery rhymes. These include "Old MacDonald Had a Farm", "Turkey in the Straw, "Three Blind Mice", "I'm a Little Teapot", "Itsy Bitsy Spider" and "Bingo". The CD can also be used as an audio disk or with the built in Jukebox to listen to the songs featured in the game.

Tuneland's cast includes a large number of musicians including the Doobie Brothers' Jeff "Skunk" Baxter and Pink Floyd's David Gilmour on guitars. Jon Anderson from Yes provides some vocals and Scott Page of Supertramp performs on the soundtrack for the game.

== Reception ==
In April 1994 Computer Gaming World said that Tuneland was "a wholly captivating experience for both children and their parents" The magazine in May 1994 said that the game "uses traditional animation techniques and a lot of creative humor" to teach songs and rhymes "children would normally have to learn from Barney".

Tuneland received various awards including World Class Award for Children's CD-ROM Game from PC World, and an Award in Excellence from the Film Advisory Board. In 1994 it was also featured in the Top 10 Best Kids Products of the Year from Entertainment Weekly and the Top 100 CD-ROMs from PC Magazine.

A screenshot of the opening location of the game, also showing Little Howie.
