= Delicate Sound of Thunder =

- Cover design by Hipgnosis

Live album by Pink Floyd
- Released: 21 November 1988
- Recorded: 19–23 August 1988
- Venues: Nassau Coliseum, Uniondale, New York
- Genre: Progressive rock
- Length: 104:08 (original release); 140:18 (2019 remixed and expanded edition)
- Label: EMI
- Producer: David Gilmour

Pink Floyd chronology
A Momentary Lapse of Reason (1987)	Delicate Sound of Thunder (1988)	Shine On (1992)

2019 Remix cover

Professional ratings
Review scores
Source	Rating
AllMusic	2.5/5 stars
Blender	3/5 stars
Robert Christgau	C
The Encyclopedia of Popular Music	3/5 stars
Rolling Stone	2/5 stars

Delicate Sound of Thunder is a live album by the English rock band Pink Floyd. It was recorded over five nights at the Nassau Coliseum in Uniondale, New York, in August 1988, during their A Momentary Lapse of Reason Tour, and mixed at Abbey Road Studios in September 1988. It was released on 21 November 1988, through EMI Records in the UK and Columbia Records in the United States.

The album was remixed, restored and reissued in December 2019 for The Later Years 1987–2019 box set. This version included songs that were not present on the original release. In November 2020, it was given a standalone release.

== Release and reissue ==
The album was released in 1988 as a double LP, double cassette, and a double CD, each format containing a slightly different track listing. The album includes many works from A Momentary Lapse of Reason as well as tracks from older Pink Floyd albums. The double LP release did not have "Us and Them" on the track listing. Both the double LP and the double cassette had "Wish You Were Here" between "Another Brick in the Wall (Part 2)" and "Comfortably Numb".

Although it was stated in interviews around the time of its release that the album contained no studio overdubbing, according to engineer Buford Jones, it does contain three overdubs: David Gilmour recorded a new acoustic guitar part on "Comfortably Numb", Richard Wright redid his vocals on "Us and Them", and Sam Brown replaced Rachel Fury's backing vocals in "Comfortably Numb".

Along with A Collection of Great Dance Songs, Delicate Sound of Thunder was reissued on 180g heavyweight vinyl LP in November 2017. Its artwork replicates that of the original 1988 LP release.

An expanded version of the live album was included in The Later Years 1987–2019 box set in 2019. Previously unreleased tracks include "Signs of Life," "A New Machine (Part 1)", "Terminal Frost", "A New Machine (Part 2)", "Welcome to the Machine", and "One Slip". All tracks were remixed for the 2019 reissue.

== Commercial performance and reception ==
Delicate Sound of Thunder reached #11 on the Billboard 200. It was certified gold and platinum on 23 January 1989 and triple platinum in April 1997. In Canada, it was #57 in the 1989 year-end chart.

In December 2020, the album reentered the Billboard album chart at #76, thanks to sales of the deluxe reissue.

Musician reviewer J. D. Considine wrote simply: "Further proof that you can't listen to a light show."

Delicate Sound of Thunder became the first album to be played in space, when Soviet cosmonauts took it aboard Soyuz TM-7. David Gilmour and Nick Mason attended the mission's launch.

== Track listing ==
=== CD ===
Disc one
No.	Title	Writer(s)	Length
1.	"Shine On You Crazy Diamond"	Roger Waters; David Gilmour; Richard Wright	11:53
2.	"Learning to Fly"	Gilmour; Anthony Moore; Bob Ezrin; Jon Carin	5:27
3.	"Yet Another Movie"	Gilmour; Patrick Leonard	6:21
4.	"Round and Around"	Gilmour	0:33
5.	"Sorrow"	Gilmour	9:28
6.	"The Dogs of War"	Gilmour; Moore	7:18
7.	"On the Turning Away"	Gilmour; Moore	7:58

Disc two
No.	Title	Writer(s)	Length
1.	"One of These Days"	Waters; Gilmour; Wright; Nick Mason	6:15
2.	"Time"	Gilmour; Waters; Mason; Wright	5:16
3.	"Wish You Were Here"	Waters; Gilmour	4:49
4.	"Us and Them"	Waters; Wright	7:22
5.	"Money"	Waters	9:52
6.	"Another Brick in the Wall (Part 2)"	Waters	5:28
7.	"Comfortably Numb"	Gilmour; Waters	8:56
8.	"Run Like Hell"	Gilmour; Waters	7:12

== 2019 reissue ==
Delicate Sound of Thunder was reissued on CD on 13 December 2019 as part of the box set The Later Years 1987–2019 along with the film of the same name. The album has been remixed and remastered and includes tracks omitted from the original 1988 release. A standalone release was released on 20 November 2020 on 2 CD, triple LP, and CD/DVD/BD box set which includes the 2019 cut of the film.

In the 2019 remix, the songs "Sorrow", "On the Turning Away" and "Comfortably Numb" have longer guitar solos by Gilmour than in the 1988 original; "The Dogs of War" has a longer intro; "Money" has been condensed, removing Guy Pratt's bass solo and the female a cappella section; "Another Brick in the Wall (Part 2)" has extra elements (lifted from 1989 tour recordings) added in - most notably an extra "hey teacher!" between Gilmour's and Renwick's guitar solos; "Us and Them" has a piano added to the intro; much of the echo has been removed from Wallis' electronic drums during "Learning to Fly"; "Run Like Hell" has an extended intro and now includes Gilmour thanking the audience; and "Time" guitar's intro starts sooner within the "tic-tac" (as performed on Pulse) than the 1988 original.

"Learning to Fly", "Us and Them", and "Run Like Hell" from the 2019 remix are also included in the 2019 compilation album The Later Years 1987–2019 Highlights, released on 29 November 2019.

=== Track listing ===
Disc 1

1. "Shine On You Crazy Diamond" (21 August 1988)
2. "Signs of Life" (previously unreleased)
3. "Learning to Fly" (21 August 1988)
4. "Yet Another Movie" (21 August 1988)
5. "Round and Around" (21 August 1988)
6. "A New Machine (Part 1)" (previously unreleased)
7. "Terminal Frost" (previously unreleased) (20 August 1988)
8. "A New Machine (Part 2)" (previously unreleased)
9. "Sorrow" (23 August 1988)
10. "The Dogs of War" (20 August 1988)
11. "On the Turning Away" (21 August 1988)

Disc 2

1. "One of These Days" (22 August 1988)
2. "Time" (19/21 August 1988)
3. "On the Run" (previously unreleased)
4. "The Great Gig in the Sky" (previously unreleased) (21 August 1988)
5. "Wish You Were Here" (23 August 1988)
6. "Welcome to the Machine" (previously unreleased) (21 August 1988)
7. "Us and Them" (21 August 1988)
8. "Money" (21 August 1988)
9. "Another Brick in the Wall (Part 2)" (21 August 1988)
10. "Comfortably Numb" (23 August 1988)
11. "One Slip" (previously unreleased) (19 August 1988)
12. "Run Like Hell" (19 August 1988)

== Personnel ==
Pink Floyd

- David Gilmour – guitars, console steel guitar, lead vocals, production and 2019/2020 remixing
- Nick Mason – drums, percussion
- Richard Wright – keyboards, backing vocals, co-lead vocals on "Time" and "Comfortably Numb"

Additional musicians

- Jon Carin – keyboards, programming, backing vocals, co-lead vocals on "Sorrow" and "Comfortably Numb".
- Guy Pratt – bass guitar, backing vocals, co-lead vocals on "Another Brick in the Wall (Part 2)" and "Run Like Hell"
- Tim Renwick – guitars, backing vocals, co lead vocals on "Yet Another Movie"
- Scott Page – saxophones, guitar
- Gary Wallis – percussion, additional keyboards on "Comfortably Numb"
- Rachel Fury – backing vocals
- Durga McBroom – backing vocals
- Machan Taylor (as Margret Taylor) – backing vocals

Production

- Doug Sax – mastering (on original 1988 release)
- David Gleeson – assistant engineering
- Buford Jones – engineering, mixing on original 1988 release
- Dimo Safari – band photography
- Storm Thorgerson and Nick Marchant – cover design and graphics (on original 1988 release)
- David Hewitt – remote recording
- Andy Jackson - Remastering and remixing on 2019/2020 re-release
- Damon Iddins - assistant remixing on 2019/2020 re-release
- Steve Knee - Cover photography on 2020 remixed/expanded reissue
- Aubrey Powell of Hipgnosis - supervising artwork on 2019/2020 re-release

== Charts ==
=== Weekly charts ===
Weekly chart performance for Delicate Sound of Thunder
Chart (1988–2020)	Peak position
Australian Albums (ARIA)	4
Austrian Albums (Ö3 Austria)	15
Belgian Albums (Ultratop Flanders)	36
Belgian Albums (Ultratop Wallonia)	17
Czech Albums (ČNS IFPI)	23
Dutch Albums (Album Top 100)	20
Finnish Albums (Suomen virallinen lista)	16
German Albums (Offizielle Top 100)	5
Hungarian Albums (MAHASZ)	7
Italian Albums (Musica e Dischi)	2
New Zealand Albums (RMNZ)	4
Norwegian Albums (VG-lista)	2
Polish Albums (ZPAV)	12
Scottish Albums (Official Charts)	9
Slovak Albums (ČNS IFPI)	65
Spanish Albums (AFYVE)	15
Swedish Albums (Sverigetopplistan)	14
Swiss Albums (Schweizer Hitparade)	4
UK Albums (Official Charts)	11
US Billboard 200	11

=== Year-end charts ===
Year-end chart performance for Delicate Sound of Thunder
Chart (1989)	Position
Dutch Albums (Album Top 100)	49
German Albums (Offizielle Top 100)	51
New Zealand Albums (RMNZ)	42
Swiss Albums (Schweizer Hitparade)	25

== Certifications and sales ==
Region	Certification	Certified units/sales
Argentina (CAPIF)	Gold	30,000^{^}
Argentina (CAPIF) Delicado Sonido Del True	Gold	30,000^{^}
Australia (ARIA)	3× Platinum	210,000^{‡}
Austria (IFPI Austria)	Gold	25,000^{*}
Canada (Music Canada)	2× Platinum	200,000^{^}
France (SNEP)	2× Gold	200,000^{*}
Germany (BVMI)	Gold	250,000^{^}
Italy sales in 1989	—	300,000
Italy (FIMI) sales since 2009	Gold	25,000^{‡}
Netherlands (NVPI)	Gold	50,000^{^}
New Zealand (RMNZ)	Platinum	15,000^{^}
Poland (ZPAV)	Gold	10,000^{‡}
Portugal (AFP)	3× Platinum	120,000^{^}
Spain (Promusicae)	Gold	50,000^{^}
Switzerland (IFPI Switzerland)	Platinum	50,000^{^}
United Kingdom (BPI)	Gold	100,000^{^}
United States (RIAA)	3× Platinum	1,500,000^{^}
^{*} Sales figures based on certification alone.^{^} Shipments figures based on certification alone.^{‡} Sales+streaming figures based on certification alone.
