= Yet Another Movie =

Song by Pink Floyd

from the album A Momentary Lapse of Reason
- Released: 7 September 1987
- Recorded: 1987
- Genre: Progressive rock
- Length: 6:13; 7:28 (with "Round and Around")
- Label: EMI (UK); Columbia (US)
- Songwriters: David Gilmour; Patrick Leonard
- Producers: Bob Ezrin; David Gilmour

Audio
- "Yet Another Movie" on YouTube

"Yet Another Movie" is the sixth track, along with "Round and Around", on Pink Floyd's 1987 album, A Momentary Lapse of Reason. It began as an instrumental piece to which words were later added and features soundbites from the films One-Eyed Jacks and Casablanca. It criticizes the derivative nature of Hollywood.

The song was written by David Gilmour and producer/ keyboardist Patrick Leonard. The originally released version was produced by Bob Ezrin.

== Live ==
The piece was performed at every show in Pink Floyd's 1987–1989 tours as the fourth piece in the first set of the show (falling between "Learning to Fly" and "Round and Around") and was featured on the live album Delicate Sound of Thunder. The lap steel guitar that appears at the end of the studio version of "Yet Another Movie" was replaced by a normal guitar solo played at a lower octave on the live performances of the track. On Delicate Sound of Thunder and the 2011 remaster of A Momentary Lapse of Reason, the band separated "Yet Another Movie" from "Round and Around" into different tracks.

== Demo ==
On 24 September 2021, Pink Floyd published the original, instrumental, demo of the track, recorded on The Astoria in September 1986, on YouTube. Featuring only Gilmour, on a fretless bass, and Leonard, it runs to 6 minutes 39 seconds.

== Personnel ==
Pink Floyd

- David Gilmour – lead and backing vocals, electric guitar
- Nick Mason – drums (middle section)

Additional musicians

- Patrick Leonard – synthesizers, programming
- Jon Carin – synthesizers, piano
- Tony Levin – bass guitar
- Jim Keltner – drums
- Steve Forman – percussion
- John Helliwell - saxophone (intro)

Delicate Sound of Thunder live version:

- David Gilmour – lead guitar, lead vocals
- Nick Mason – drums
- Richard Wright – keyboards

Additional musicians

- Jon Carin – keyboards, backing vocals
- Guy Pratt – bass guitar
- Tim Renwick – rhythm guitar, backing vocals
- Gary Wallis – percussion
