= A Momentary Lapse of Reason =

- Original cover (Note: Two alternative covers were also released for streaming platforms and other reissues: one excludes the overlay and features a lady cleaning the land, while the other shows a close-up of the man sitting on a bed and excludes the title)

Studio album by Pink Floyd
- Released: 7 September 1987
- Recorded: November 1986 – March 1987
- Studios: Astoria, Mayfair, Britannia Row, and Audio International in London; A&M, Village Recorders, and Can Am in Los Angeles, California; Le Mobile
- Genre: Progressive rock
- Length: 50:51
- Labels: EMI; Columbia
- Producers: Bob Ezrin; David Gilmour

Pink Floyd chronology
| Works (1983) | A Momentary Lapse of Reason (1987) | Delicate Sound of Thunder (1988) |

Singles from A Momentary Lapse of Reason
- 1. "Learning to Fly" Released: 7 September 1987; 2. "On the Turning Away" Released: 7 December 1987; 3. "One Slip" Released: 13 June 1988

A Momentary Lapse of Reason is the thirteenth studio album by the English rock band Pink Floyd, released in the UK on 7 September 1987 by EMI and the following day in the US by Columbia Records. It was recorded primarily on the converted houseboat Astoria, belonging to the guitarist, David Gilmour.

A Momentary Lapse of Reason was the first Pink Floyd album recorded without founding member Roger Waters, who departed in 1985. The production was marred by legal fights with Waters over the rights to the Pink Floyd name, which were not resolved until several months after release. It also saw the return of founder member Richard Wright, the group's keyboardist who had been fired by Waters during the recording of The Wall (1979). Wright returned as a session player.

Unlike most of Pink Floyd's studio records from the preceding decade, A Momentary Lapse of Reason is not a concept album. It includes writing contributions from outside songwriters, following Gilmour's decision to include material once intended for his third solo album. The album was promoted with three singles: the double A-side "Learning to Fly" / "Terminal Frost", "On the Turning Away", and "One Slip".

A Momentary Lapse of Reason received mixed reviews. Critics praised the production and instrumentation, but criticised the songwriting, especially the lyrics, and it was derided by Waters. It reached number three in the UK and US, and outsold Pink Floyd's previous album, The Final Cut (1983). It was supported by a successful world tour between 1987 and 1989, including a free performance on a barge on the Grand Canal in Venice, Italy.

== Background ==
After the release of Pink Floyd's 1983 studio album The Final Cut, viewed by some as a de facto solo record by bassist and songwriter Roger Waters, the band members worked on solo projects. Guitarist David Gilmour expressed feelings about his strained relationship with Waters on his second solo studio album, About Face (1984), and finished the accompanying tour as Waters began touring to promote his debut solo studio album, The Pros and Cons of Hitch Hiking. Although both had enlisted a range of successful performers, including in Waters' case Eric Clapton, their solo acts attracted fewer fans than Pink Floyd; poor ticket sales forced Gilmour to cancel several concerts, and critic David Fricke felt that Waters' show was "a petulant echo, a transparent attempt to prove that Roger Waters was Pink Floyd". Waters returned to the US in March 1985 with a second tour, this time without the support of CBS Records, which had expressed its preference for a new Pink Floyd album; Waters criticised the corporation as "a machine".

At that time, certainly, I just thought, I can't really see how we can make the next record or if we can it's a long time in the future, and it'll probably be more for, just because of feeling of some obligation that we ought to do it, rather than for any enthusiasm.

— Nick Mason, In the Studio with Redbeard (1994)

After drummer Nick Mason attended one of Waters' London performances in 1985, he found he missed touring under the Pink Floyd name. His visit coincided with the release in August of his second solo album, Profiles, on which Gilmour sang. With a shared love of aviation, Mason and Gilmour were taking flying lessons and together bought a de Havilland Dove aeroplane. Gilmour was working on other collaborations, including a performance for Bryan Ferry at 1985's Live Aid concert, and co-produced the Dream Academy's self-titled debut album.

In December 1985, Waters announced that he had left Pink Floyd, which he believed was "a spent force creatively". After the failure of his About Face tour, Gilmour hoped to continue with the Pink Floyd name. The threat of a lawsuit from Gilmour, Mason and CBS Records was meant to compel Waters to write and produce another Pink Floyd album with his bandmates, who had barely participated in making The Final Cut; Gilmour was especially critical of the album, labelling it "cheap filler" and "meandering rubbish".

They threatened me with the fact that we had a contract with CBS Records and that part of the contract could be construed to mean that we had a product commitment with CBS and if we didn't go on producing product, they could a) sue us and b) withhold royalties if we didn't make any more records. So they said, 'that's what the record company are going to do and the rest of the band are going to sue you for all their legal expenses and any loss of earnings because you're the one that's preventing the band from making any more records.' They forced me to resign from the band because, if I hadn't, the financial repercussions would have wiped me out completely.

— Roger Waters, Uncut (June 2004), explaining why he stopped his legal challenge

According to Gilmour, "I told [Waters] before he left, 'If you go, man, we're carrying on. Make no bones about it, we would carry on', and Roger replied: 'You'll never fucking do it.'" Waters had written to EMI and Columbia declaring his intention to leave the group and asking them to release him from his contractual obligations. He also dispensed with the services of Pink Floyd manager Steve O'Rourke and employed Peter Rudge to manage his affairs. This left Gilmour and Mason, in their view, free to continue with the Pink Floyd name. In 2013, Waters said he regretted the lawsuit and had not understood English jurisprudence.

In Waters' absence, Gilmour had been recruiting musicians for a new project. Months previously, keyboardist Jon Carin had jammed with Gilmour at his Hook End studio, where he composed the chord progression that became "Learning to Fly", and so was invited onto the team. Gilmour invited Bob Ezrin (co-producer of 1979's The Wall) to help consolidate their material; Ezrin had turned down Waters' offer of a role on the development of his new solo album, Radio K.A.O.S., saying it was "far easier for Dave and I to do our version of a Floyd record". Ezrin arrived in England in mid-1986 for what Gilmour later described as "mucking about with a lot of demos".

At this stage, there was no commitment to a new Pink Floyd release, and Gilmour maintained that the material might become his third solo album. CBS representative Stephen Ralbovsky hoped for a new Pink Floyd album, but in a meeting in November 1986, told Gilmour and Ezrin that the music "doesn't sound a fucking thing like Pink Floyd". By the end of that year, Gilmour had decided to make the material into a Pink Floyd project, and agreed to rework the material that Ralbovsky had found objectionable.

== Recording ==
You can't go back ... You have to find a new way of working, of operating and getting on with it. We didn't make this remotely like we've made any other Floyd record. It was different systems, everything.

— David Gilmour

Gilmour experimented with songwriters such as Eric Stewart and Roger McGough, but settled on Anthony Moore, who was credited as co-writer of "Learning to Fly" and "On the Turning Away". Whereas many prior Pink Floyd albums are concept albums, Gilmour chose a more conventional approach of a collection of songs without a thematic link. Gilmour later said that the project had been difficult without Waters.

A Momentary Lapse of Reason was recorded in several studios, mainly Gilmour's houseboat studio Astoria, moored on the Thames; according to Ezrin, "working there was just magical, so inspirational; kids sculling down the river, geese flying by...". Andy Jackson was brought in to engineer. During sessions held between November 1986 and February 1987, Gilmour's band worked on new material, which in a change from previous Pink Floyd albums was mostly recorded with a 32-track ProDigi digital recorder apart from the drum tracks, which were recorded with a 24-track analogue machine. This trend of using new technologies continued with the use of MIDI synchronisation, aided by an Apple Macintosh computer.

Ezrin suggested incorporating rap, an idea dismissed by Gilmour. After agreeing to rework the material that Ralbovsky had found objectionable, Gilmour employed session musicians such as Carmine Appice and Jim Keltner. Both drummers replaced Mason on several songs; Mason was concerned that he was too out of practice to perform on the album, and instead busied himself with its sound effects. Some drum parts were also performed by drum machines. In his memoir, Mason wrote: "In hindsight, I really should have had the self-belief to play all the drum parts. And in the early days of life after Roger, I think David and I felt that we had to get it right, or we would be slaughtered."

During the sessions, Gilmour was asked by the wife of Pink Floyd's former keyboardist, Richard Wright, if he could contribute. A founding member of the band, Wright had left in 1981, and there were legal obstacles to his return; after a meeting in Hampstead he was recruited as a paid musician on a weekly wage of $11,000. Gilmour said in an interview that Wright's presence "would make us stronger legally and musically". However, his contributions were minimal; most of the keyboard parts had already been recorded, and so from February 1987 Wright played some background reinforcement on a Hammond organ, and a Rhodes piano, and added vocal harmonies. He also performed a solo in "On the Turning Away", which was discarded, according to Wright, "not because they didn't like it ... they just thought it didn't fit".

Gilmour later said: "Both Nick and Rick were catatonic in terms of their playing ability at the beginning. Neither of them played on this at all really. In my view, they'd been destroyed by Roger." Gilmour's comments angered Mason, who said: "I'd deny that I was catatonic. I'd expect that from the opposition, it's less attractive from one's allies. At some point, he made some sort of apology." Mason conceded that Gilmour was nervous about how the album would be perceived.

"Learning to Fly"
With frequent use of samplers and drum machines, A Momentary Lapse of Reason demonstrates a significant change in style over the more traditionally recorded Final Cut. "Learning to Fly" was heavily influenced by Gilmour's flying lessons.

"Learning to Fly" was inspired by Gilmour's flying lessons, which occasionally conflicted with his studio duties. The track also contains a recording of Mason's voice during takeoff. The band experimented with samples, and Ezrin recorded the sound of Gilmour's boatman Langley Iddens rowing across the Thames. Iddens' presence at the sessions became vital when Astoria began to lift in response to the rapidly rising river, which was pushing the boat against the pier on which it was moored.

"The Dogs of War" is a song about "physical and political mercenaries", according to Gilmour. It came about through a mishap in the studio when a sampling machine began playing a sample of laughter, which Gilmour thought sounded like a dog's bark. "Terminal Frost" was one of Gilmour's older demos, which he decided to leave as an instrumental. Conversely, the lyrics for "Sorrow" were written before the music. The song's opening guitar solo was recorded in the Los Angeles Memorial Sports Arena. A 24-track mobile studio piped Gilmour's guitar tracks through a public address system, and the resulting mix was then recorded in surround sound.

=== Legal disputes ===
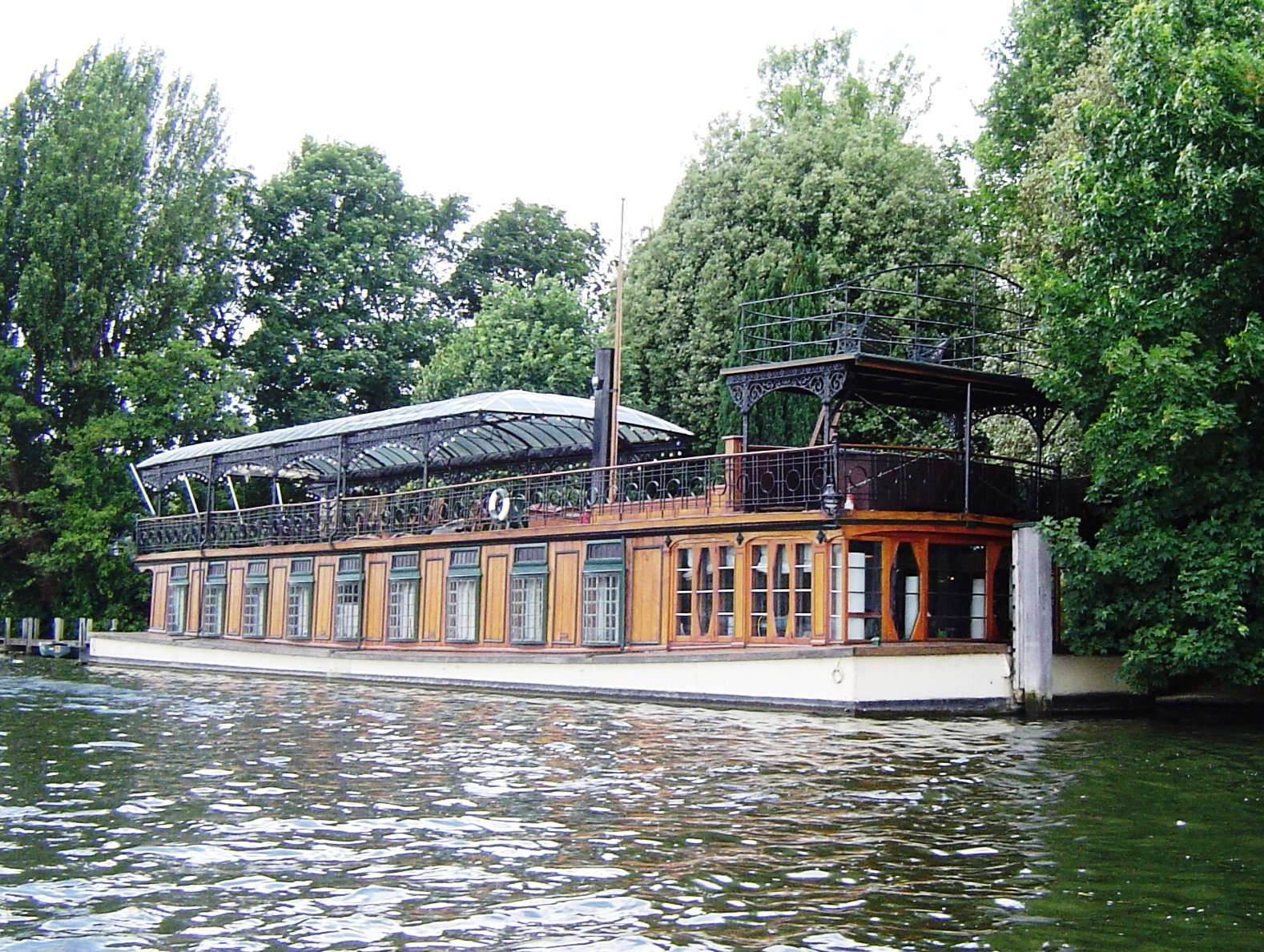
Astoria

The sessions were interrupted by the escalating disagreement between Waters and Pink Floyd over who had the rights to the Pink Floyd name. O'Rourke, believing that his contract with Waters had been terminated illegally, sued Waters for £25,000 of back-commission. In a late-1986 board meeting of Pink Floyd Music Ltd (Pink Floyd's clearing house for all financial transactions since 1973), Waters learnt that a bank account had been opened to deal exclusively with all monies related to "the new Pink Floyd project". He immediately applied to the High Court to prevent the Pink Floyd name from being used again, but his lawyers discovered that the partnership had never been formally confirmed. Waters returned to the High Court in an attempt to gain a veto over further use of the band's name. Gilmour's team responded by issuing a press release affirming that Pink Floyd would continue to exist. Gilmour told a Sunday Times reporter: "Roger is a dog in the manger and I'm going to fight him; no one else has claimed Pink Floyd was entirely them. Anybody who does is extremely arrogant."

Waters twice visited Astoria, and with his wife had a meeting in August 1986 with Ezrin, who later suggested that he was being "checked out". As Waters was still a shareholder and director of Pink Floyd Music, he was able to block any decisions made by his former bandmates. Recording moved to Mayfair Studios in February 1987, and from February to March – under the terms of an agreement with Ezrin to record close to his home – to A&M Studios in Los Angeles: "It was fantastic because ... the lawyers couldn't call in the middle of recording unless they were calling in the middle of the night." The bitterness of the row between Waters and Pink Floyd was covered in a November 1987 issue of Rolling Stone, which became the magazine's best-selling issue of that year. The legal disputes were resolved out of court by the end of 1987.

== Packaging and title ==
The original LP gatefold includes, for the first time since 1971's Meddle, (Note: Photographs of the band on stage were used on a poster that was included in copies of 1973's The Dark Side of the Moon.) an image of the band. Wright appears only by name in the credits, as he wasn't a member of the band due to legal complications.

Careful consideration was given to the album's title, with the initial three contenders being Signs of Life, Of Promises Broken and Delusions of Maturity. The final title appears as a line in the chorus of "One Slip".

For the first time since 1977's Animals, designer Storm Thorgerson was employed to work on a Pink Floyd studio album cover. (Note: Thorgerson also worked on the cover of the 1981 compilation A Collection of Great Dance Songs.) His finished design was a long river of hospital beds arranged on a beach, inspired by a phrase from "Yet Another Movie" and Gilmour's vague hint of a design that included a bed in a Mediterranean house, as well as "vestiges of relationships that have evaporated, leaving only echoes". The cover shows hundreds of hospital beds assembled in July 1987 on Saunton Sands in North Devon, where some of the scenes for Pink Floyd – The Wall were filmed. The beds were arranged by Thorgerson's colleague Colin Elgie. An ultralight in the sky references "Learning to Fly". The photographer, Robert Dowling, won a gold award at the Association of Photographers Awards for the image, which took about two weeks to create. Some versions of the cover do not feature the ultralight, and other versions feature a nurse making one of the beds.

To emphasise that Waters had left the band, the inner gatefold featured a photograph of just Gilmour and Mason shot by David Bailey. Its inclusion marked the first time since Meddle (1971) that a group photo had been used in the packaging of a Pink Floyd album. Wright was represented only by name, on the credits. According to Mason, Wright's leaving agreement contained a clause that prevented him rejoining the band, and "consequently we had to be careful about what constituted being a member". In later reissues of the album, Wright's image was added to the band portrait.

== Release and reception ==
Professional ratings
Review scores
| Source | Rating |
|---|---|
| AllMusic | 2/5 stars |
| The Daily Telegraph | 1/5 stars |
| Encyclopedia of Popular Music | 3/5 stars |
| MusicHound Rock | 2/5 |
| The Rolling Stone Album Guide | 2/5 stars |
| The Village Voice | C |

A Momentary Lapse of Reason was released in the UK and US on 7 September 1987. (Note: UK EMI EMD 1003 (vinyl album), EMI CDP 7480682 (CD album). US Columbia OC 40599 (vinyl album released 8 September 1987), Columbia CK 40599 (CD album)) It went straight to number three in both countries, held from the top spot in the US by Michael Jackson's Bad and Whitesnake's self-titled album. It spent 34 weeks on the UK Albums Chart. It was certified silver and gold in the UK on 1 October 1987, and gold and platinum in the US on 9 November. It went double platinum on 18 January the following year, triple platinum on 10 March 1992, and quadruple platinum on 16 August 2001, greatly outselling The Final Cut.

Gilmour presented A Momentary Lapse as a return to an older Pink Floyd sound, citing his belief that under Waters' tenure, lyrics had become more important than music. He said that their albums The Dark Side of the Moon and Wish You Were Here were successful "not just because of Roger's contributions, but also because there was a better balance between the music and the lyrics [than on later albums]". Waters said of A Momentary Lapse: "I think it's very facile, but a quite clever forgery ... The songs are poor in general; the lyrics I can't quite believe. Gilmour's lyrics are very third-rate." Wright said Waters' criticisms were "fair". In a later interview, Waters said the album had "a couple of really nice tunes" and chord sequences and melodies he would have retained had he been involved.

In Q, Phil Sutcliffe wrote that it "does sound like a Pink Floyd album" and highlighted the two-part "A New Machine" as "a chillingly beautiful vocal exploration" and a "brilliant stroke of imagination". He concluded: "A Momentary Lapse is Gilmour's album to much the same degree that the previous four under Floyd's name were dominated by Waters ... Clearly it wasn't only business sense and repressed ego but repressed talent which drove the guitarist to insist on continuing under the band brand-name." Recognising the return to a more music-oriented approach, Sounds said the album was "back over the wall to where diamonds are crazy, moons have dark sides, and mothers have atom hearts".

Conversely, Greg Quill of the Toronto Star wrote: "Something's missing here. This is, for all its lumbering weight, not a record that challenges and provokes as Pink Floyd should. A Momentary Lapse of Reason, sorry to say, is mundane, predictable." Village Voice critic Robert Christgau wrote: "You'd hardly know the group's conceptmaster was gone – except that they put out noticeably fewer ideas." In 2016, AllMusic critic William Ruhlmann described it as a "Gilmour solo album in all but name".

In 2016, Nick Shilton chose A Momentary Lapse of Reason as one of the "Top 10 Essential 80s Prog Albums" for Prog. He wrote: "While it's not a patch on the Floyd masterworks of the 70s, it merits inclusion here. The ironically titled 'Signs of Life' is an instrumental prelude for 'Learning to Fly' which showcases Gilmour's guitar, while the pulsating 'The Dogs of War' is considerably darker, and the uplifting 'On the Turning Away' simply sublime."

== Reissues ==
A Momentary Lapse of Reason was reissued in 1988 as a limited-edition vinyl with posters and a guaranteed ticket application for Pink Floyd's upcoming UK concerts. (Note: UK EMI EMDS 1003) It was digitally remastered and rereleased in 1994. (Note: UK EMI CD EMD 1003) A tenth-anniversary edition was issued in the US in 1997. (Note: US Columbia CK 68518)

In December 2019, A Momentary Lapse of Reason was reissued again as part of the Later Years box set. It was updated and remixed by Gilmour and Jackson, with restored contributions from Wright and newly recorded drum tracks from Mason to "restore the creative balance between the three Pink Floyd members". Rolling Stone described this version as "more tasteful ... [It] doesn't drown in eighties reverb the way the original did ... Although none of the Momentary Lapse remixes will be dramatic enough to sway the band's critics, they add clarity to what Gilmour was trying to achieve."

== Tour ==
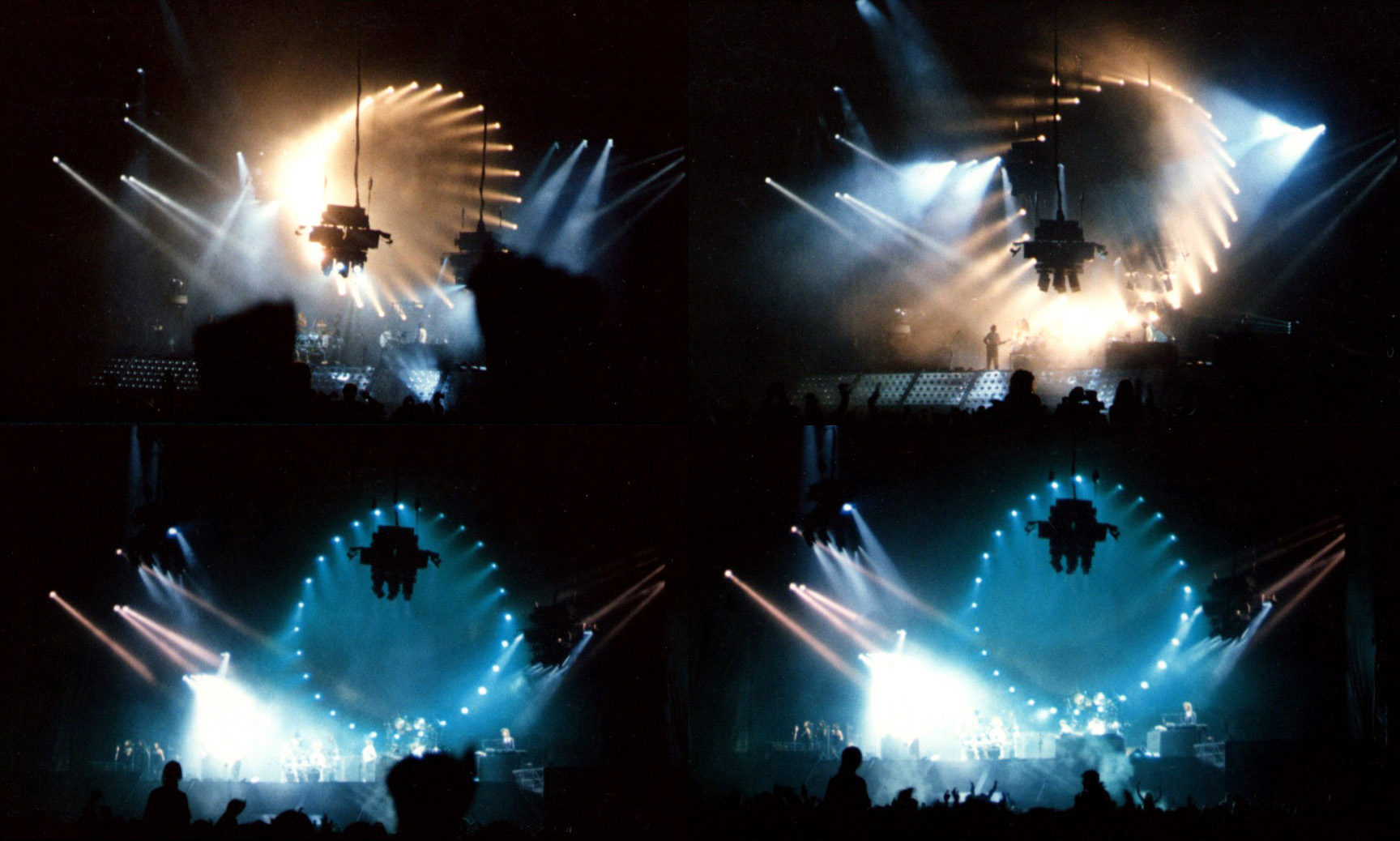
A photo-montage of the stage on the Momentary Lapse Tour

Pink Floyd toured for A Momentary Lapse of Reason before it was complete. Early rehearsals were chaotic; Mason and Wright were out of practice, and, realising he had taken on too much work, Gilmour asked Ezrin to take charge. Gilmour and Mason funded the start-up costs; Mason, separated from his wife, used his Ferrari 250 GTO as collateral. Matters were complicated when Waters contacted several US promoters and threatened to sue if they used the Pink Floyd name. Some promoters were offended by Waters' threat, and several months later 60,000 tickets went on sale in Toronto, selling out within hours.

As the new line-up (with Wright) toured throughout North America, Waters' Radio K.A.O.S. tour was sometimes close by. Waters forbade the members of Pink Floyd to attend his concerts, (Note: Mason (2005) states that "rumour had it we would not be allowed in") which were generally in smaller venues. Waters also issued a writ for copyright fees for use of the Pink Floyd flying pig; Pink Floyd responded by attaching a huge set of male genitalia to the balloon's underside to distinguish it from Waters' design. By November 1987, Waters had given up, and on 23 December a legal settlement was reached at a meeting on Astoria.

The Momentary Lapse tour beat box office records in every US venue it booked, and was the most successful US tour that year. Tours of Australia, Japan, and Europe followed, before two more tours of the US. Almost every venue was sold out. A live album, Delicate Sound of Thunder, was released on 22 November 1988, followed in June 1989 by a concert video. A few days later, the live album was played in orbit, on board Soyuz TM-7. The tour eventually came to an end by closing the Silver Clef Award Winners Concert, at Knebworth Park on 30 June 1990, after 200 performances, a gross audience of 4.25 million fans, and box office receipts of more than £60 million (not including merchandising). The tour included a free performance on a barge floating on the Grand Canal in Venice, Italy.

== Track listing ==
All tracks are written or co-written by David Gilmour. Additional writers are listed along.

Side one
| No. | Title | Writer(s) | Length |
|---|---|---|---|
| 1. | "Signs of Life" | Bob Ezrin | 4:22 |
| 2. | "Learning to Fly" | Anthony Moore; Ezrin; Jon Carin | 4:52 |
| 3. | "The Dogs of War" | Moore | 6:03 |
| 4. | "One Slip" | Phil Manzanera | 5:06 |
| 5. | "On the Turning Away" | Moore | 5:39 |
| Total length: | | | 26:02 |

Side two
| No. | Title | Writer(s) | Length |
|---|---|---|---|
| 6. | "Yet Another Movie" / "Round and Around" | Patrick Leonard / | 6:17/1:06 |
| 7. | "A New Machine – Part 1" | | 1:47 |
| 8. | "Terminal Frost" | | 6:16 |
| 9. | "A New Machine – Part 2" | | 0:38 |
| 10. | "Sorrow" | | 8:45 |
| Total length: | | | 24:49 |

Notes:

- Since the 2011 remasters, and the Discovery box set, "Yet Another Movie" and "Round and Around" are indexed as individual tracks, making an 11-track album.
- The vinyl release of the 2019 mix (using the 11-track listing) contains tracks 1–3 on side one, 4–5 on side two, 6–10 on side three, and track 11 on side four

== Personnel ==
Pink Floyd

- David Gilmour – vocals, guitars, keyboards, fretless bass guitar, drum programming, sequencers, production
- Nick Mason – electronic and acoustic drums, spoken vocals, sound effects
- Richard Wright – backing vocals, piano, Hammond organ, Kurzweil synthesiser

Note: Wright was credited among the additional musicians on the original release. All reissues since 2011 credit him as an official band member.

Additional personnel

- Bob Ezrin – keyboards, percussion, sequencers, production
- Jon Carin – keyboards
- Patrick Leonard – synthesisers
- Bill Payne – Hammond organ
- Michael Landau – guitar
- Tony Levin – bass guitar, Chapman Stick
- Jim Keltner – drums
- Carmine Appice – drums
- Steve Forman – percussion
- Tom Scott – alto saxophone, soprano saxophone
- John Helliwell – saxophone (credited as John Halliwell)
- Scott Page – tenor saxophone
- Darlene Koldenhoven (credited as Darlene Koldenhaven) – backing vocals
- Carmen Twillie – backing vocals
- Phyllis St. James – backing vocals
- Donny Gerrard – backing vocals

Technical personnel

- Andy Jackson – engineering, mixing
- Robert (Ringo) Hrycyna – assistant
- Marc Desisto – assistant
- Stan Katayama – assistant
- Jeff Demorris – assistant
- James Guthrie – additional re-mixing, 2011 remastering at Das Boot Recording
- Joel Plante – 2011 remastering at Das Boot Recording

== Charts ==
=== Weekly charts ===
Weekly chart performance for A Momentary Lapse of Reason
| Chart (1987–2021) | Peak position |
|---|---|
| Australian Albums (ARIA) | 47 |
| Australian Albums (Kent Music Report) | 2 |
| Austrian Albums (Ö3 Austria) | 3 |
| Belgian Albums (Ultratop Flanders) | 31 |
| Belgian Albums (Ultratop Wallonia) | 8 |
| Canada Top Albums/CDs (RPM) | 5 |
| Dutch Albums (Album Top 100) | 2 |
| Finnish Albums (Suomen virallinen lista) | 48 |
| French Albums (SNEP) | 135 |
| German Albums (Offizielle Top 100) | 2 |
| Hungarian Albums (MAHASZ) | 11 |
| Irish Albums (IRMA) | 86 |
| Italian Albums (Musica e Dischi) | 4 |
| New Zealand Albums (RMNZ) | 1 |
| Norwegian Albums (VG-lista) | 2 |
| Polish Albums (ZPAV) | 12 |
| Portuguese Albums (AFP) | 39 |
| Scottish Albums (Official Charts)ERROR in "Scotland": Invalid date format. Expected: YYYYMMDD or YYYY-MM-DD. | 11 |
| Spanish Albums (AFYVE) | 12 |
| Swedish Albums (Sverigetopplistan) | 3 |
| Swiss Albums (Schweizer Hitparade) | 2 |
| UK Albums (Official Charts) | 3 |
| UK Album Downloads (Official Charts)ERROR in "UKDigital": Invalid date format. Expected: YYYYMMDD or YYYY-MM-DD. | 72 |
| UK Progressive Albums (Official Charts)ERROR in "UKProgressive": Invalid date format. Expected: YYYYMMDD or YYYY-MM-DD. | 5 |
| UK Rock & Metal Albums (Official Charts)ERROR in "UKRock": Invalid date format. Expected: YYYYMMDD or YYYY-MM-DD. | 2 |
| US Billboard 200 | 3 |

=== Year-end charts ===
1987 year-end chart performance for A Momentary Lapse of Reason
| Chart (1987) | Position |
|---|---|
| Dutch Albums (Album Top 100) | 55 |
| European (European Top 100 Albums) | 29 |
| German Albums (Offizielle Top 100) | 43 |
| New Zealand Albums (RMNZ) | 24 |
| Swiss Albums (Schweizer Hitparade) | 22 |

1988 year-end chart performance for A Momentary Lapse of Reason
| Chart (1988) | Position |
|---|---|
| Dutch Albums (Album Top 100) | 44 |
| German Albums (Offizielle Top 100) | 55 |
| US Billboard 200 | 25 |

2021 year-end chart performance for A Momentary Lapse of Reason
| Chart (2021) | Position |
|---|---|
| Hungarian Albums (MAHASZ) | 99 |

== Certifications and sales ==
Certifications and sales for A Momentary Lapse of Reason
| Region | Certification | Certified units/sales |
|---|---|---|
| Argentina (CAPIF) | Platinum | 60,000^{^} |
| Australia (ARIA) | Platinum | 200,000 |
| Austria (IFPI Austria) | Gold | 25,000^{*} |
| Brazil | — | 150,000 |
| Canada (Music Canada) | 3× Platinum | 300,000^{^} |
| France (SNEP) | Platinum | 300,000^{*} |
| Germany (BVMI) | Gold | 250,000^{^} |
| Italy (FIMI) sales since 2009 | Gold | 25,000^{*} |
| Netherlands (NVPI) | Gold | 50,000^{^} |
| Norway (IFPI Norway) | Gold | 50,000 |
| Poland (ZPAV) | Gold | 10,000^{‡} |
| Portugal (AFP) | Gold | 20,000^{^} |
| Spain (Promusicae) | Platinum | 100,000^{^} |
| Sweden (GLF) | Gold | 50,000^{^} |
| Switzerland (IFPI Switzerland) | 2× Platinum | 100,000^{^} |
| United Kingdom (BPI) | Gold | 100,000^{^} |
| United States (RIAA) certified sales 1987–2001 | 4× Platinum | 4,000,000^{^} |
| United States Nielsen sales 1991–2008 | — | 1,700,000 |
Summaries
| Worldwide | — | 10,000,000 |
^{*} Sales figures based on certification alone.^{^} Shipments figures based on certification alone.^{‡} Sales+streaming figures based on certification alone.
