= On the Turning Away =

Single by Pink Floyd

from the album A Momentary Lapse of Reason
- B-side: "Run Like Hell" (live version)
- Released: 7 December 1987
- Recorded: November 1986 – August 1987
- Genre: Progressive rock
- Length: 5:42 (album version); 4:43 (single edit)
- Label: EMI (UK); Columbia (US)
- Songwriters: David Gilmour; Anthony Moore
- Producers: Bob Ezrin; David Gilmour

Pink Floyd singles chronology
"Learning to Fly" (1987)	"On the Turning Away" (1987)	"The Dogs of War" (1988)

Audio
- "On The Turning Away" on YouTube

"On the Turning Away" is a song from Pink Floyd's 1987 album, A Momentary Lapse of Reason. The song was a staple of live shows from the 1987–89 world tours in support of A Momentary Lapse of Reason and was one of the songs in rotation during the 1994 tour in support of The Division Bell. The song was resurrected by David Gilmour on his 2006 On an Island Tour for one night only. Live recordings exist on Delicate Sound of Thunder (1988) and Live in Gdańsk (2008).

== Music and lyrics ==
The song has often been described as a protest song and is one of the more political tracks Pink Floyd released after the departure of Roger Waters. The main concept came from Anthony Moore, but David Gilmour has stated that he re-wrote the last verse of both "On the Turning Away" and "Learning to Fly". Musically, it has been called a power ballad. Bassist Guy Pratt has said about its musical structure (referring to the fact that he had to guide Phil Manzanera and Steve DiStanislao through a completely unplanned performance of it in 2006): "The song only has five chords in it, but they don't necessarily show up where you think they will."

It has also been noted for being one of Pink Floyd's rhythmically most complex songs, constantly alternating between various time signatures. Some reviewers have described it as Celtic sounding.

== Release ==
Released as the second single from the album, it reached number one on the Billboard Album Rock Tracks chart in early 1988. In the United Kingdom, the song charted at number 55 on the UK Singles Chart.

The song charted at 47 in the Netherlands, and 34 in New Zealand

Cash Box, referring to Waters' departure and Gilmour taking over the songwriting duties, said that "Atlas shrugged, and the results are stunning" and that the song "is filled with apocalyptic imagery and roughhewn rock foundations that Floyd fans crave."

== Video ==
The music video for the track featured a live recording and concert footage filmed during the band's three night run at The Omni in Atlanta, Georgia from 3 to 5 November 1987 directed by Larry Jordan (who has directed concert films for Rush, Mariah Carey, and Billy Joel). Promotional videos for "The Dogs of War" and "One Slip" also used footage of this concert. The video made it to number nine on MTV's Video Countdown in January 1988.

== Personnel ==
=== Studio ===
Pink Floyd

- David Gilmour – lead and backing vocals, electric & acoustic guitars, fretless bass guitar

Additional musicians:

- Richard Wright – Hammond organ, backing vocals
- Jon Carin – synthesizer
- Jim Keltner – drums
- Darlene Koldenhoven (as Darlene Koldenhaven) – backing vocals
- Carmen Twillie – backing vocals
- Phyllis St. James – backing vocals
- Donny Gerrard – backing vocals

=== Live Personnel 1987–1994 ===
- David Gilmour – lead vocals, lead guitar
- Nick Mason – drums
- Richard Wright – keyboards, backing vocals

Additional musicians:

- Jon Carin – synthesisers, backing vocals
- Guy Pratt – fretless bass guitar, backing vocals
- Tim Renwick – acoustic guitar, backing vocals
- Gary Wallis – percussion, drums (on the 1992 Amnesty International Big 30 concert and together with Nick Mason on the 1994 The Division Bell tour)
- Durga McBroom, Rachel Fury, Margaret Taylor – backing vocals (1987–1989)
- Sam Brown, Durga McBroom, Claudia Fontaine – backing vocals (1994)

=== David Gilmour Live 2006 ===
- David Gilmour – lead vocals, rhythm guitar, lead guitar
- Richard Wright – organ, backing vocals
- Guy Pratt – bass guitar, backing vocals
- Steve DiStanislao – drums
- Phil Manzanera – acoustic guitar
- Jon Carin – synthesisers

== Certifications ==
Certifications for "On the Turning Away"
Region	Certification	Certified units/sales
New Zealand (RMNZ)	Gold	15,000^{‡}
^{‡} Sales+streaming figures based on certification alone.
