= Round and Around (Pink Floyd song) =

Instrumental by Pink Floyd

from the album A Momentary Lapse of Reason
- Released: 7 September 1987
- Recorded: 1987
- Genre: Progressive rock, instrumental rock
- Length: 1:13; 7:28 (with "Yet Another Movie")
- Label: EMI (UK); Columbia (US)
- Songwriter: David Gilmour
- Producers: Bob Ezrin; David Gilmour

Audio
- "Round And Around" on YouTube

"Round and Around" is a song from Pink Floyd's 1987 album, A Momentary Lapse of Reason. It shares the sixth track with "Yet Another Movie", Index #2 and is a short, repetitive instrumental in 5/8 time.

== Later release ==
It was released as a separate track on the 2011 remastered CD and on the live album Delicate Sound of Thunder.

== Personnel ==
- David Gilmour – guitars, sequencer

Additional musicians

- Jon Carin – keyboards
- Tony Levin – bass guitar
