= Rachel Fury =

English singer/songwriter

- Born: Rachel Brennock; 1961 (age 64–65); Islington, London, England
- Occupations: Singer; actor; songwriter
- Instrument: Vocalist
- Years active: 1971–1990

Rachel Fury is the stage name of Rachel Brennock, an English singer, songwriter and actress known for performing with Pink Floyd on tour from 1987 to 1989.

== Career ==
Brennock attended the Barbara Speake Stage School and began her acting career at age ten appearing in TV commercials, shows and films, such as Mr Horatio Knibbles (1971), Anoop and the Elephant (1972) and Robin Hood Junior (1975). At the same time Brennock was building a career as a singer and in 1972, under the name Weeny Bopper; she recorded the single "David, Donny and Michael", a Pye Records release intended to capitalise on teenybopper enthusiasm for David Cassidy, Donny Osmond, and Michael Jackson. By 1978, Brennock was an established London session singer, known for a "sassy 'Ronettes' sound."

In the 1980s Brennock adopted the stage name Rachel Fury and toured as a backing singer with Howard Devoto and The Lover Speaks. She co-wrote and sang the song "When We Dream" with Phil Saatchi for his 1987 album Wheel of Fortune. Fury signed on as a backing singer for Pink Floyd's 'A Momentary Lapse of Reason Tour' (1987–88) and the 'Another Lapse Tour' (1989) after being introduced to the band by her former boyfriend James Guthrie, Pink Floyd's longtime recording engineer.

Fury performed on tour with Pink Floyd from 1987 to 1989 and appears in the concert film and on the live album Delicate Sound of Thunder, the Italian TV broadcast of the 1989 concert in Venice, and the MTV recording of the 1987 concert at the Omni in Atlanta. In these live performances, Fury is noted for the opening vocals on "The Great Gig in the Sky", first performed on the A Momentary Lapse of Reason tour in Tokyo and for harmonising with David Gilmour on "Comfortably Numb". Fury also appears on recordings included in The Later Years boxset (2019) where she appears in a remastered Delicate Sound of Thunder film, the Venice canal show film as well as on the expanded version of the Delicate Sound of Thunder album.

After 1989 Fury retired from the stage. She did, however, perform with fellow Pink Floyd touring member, Durga McBroom's band, Blue Pearl live in 1990.
