= Learning to Fly (Pink Floyd song) =

- Artwork for EMI release (Note: The Columbia release uses the same artwork but replaces cyan with black for the "PF" logo. Various non-UK releases either omit other titles or contain one other title on the front cover)

Single by Pink Floyd

from the album A Momentary Lapse of Reason
- B-side: "Terminal Frost"
- Released: 7 September 1987
- Recorded: November – December 1986
- Genre: Soft rock; progressive rock
- Length: 4:53 (album version); 4:21 (single edit)
- Label: EMI (UK); Columbia (US)
- Songwriters: David Gilmour; Anthony Moore; Bob Ezrin; Jon Carin
- Producers: Bob Ezrin; David Gilmour

Pink Floyd singles chronology
| "Not Now John" (1983) | "Learning to Fly" / "Terminal Frost" (1987) | "On the Turning Away" (1987) |

Music video
- Pink Floyd - Learning To Fly (Official Music Video) on YouTube

"Learning to Fly" is a song by the English progressive rock band Pink Floyd, written by David Gilmour, Anthony Moore, Bob Ezrin, and Jon Carin. It was the first single from the band's thirteenth studio album A Momentary Lapse of Reason. It reached number 70 on the U.S. Billboard Hot 100 chart and number one on the Billboard Album Rock Tracks chart in September 1987, remaining three consecutive weeks at the top position in the autumn of the same year. Meanwhile, the song failed to chart on the official UK top 40 singles chart. In Spain, the song peaked at number one on the Los 40 Principales chart.

== Background ==
The song was primarily written by David Gilmour, who developed the music from a 1986 demo by Jon Carin, while the lyrics were written by Anthony Moore. The notable rhythm pattern at the beginning of the song was already present in the demo, and Carin stated that it was influenced by Steve Jansen or Yukihiro Takahashi. Moore's demo, titled "Earthbound Misfit", featuring his lyrics with a different tune, is included on his Home of the Demo compilation, released in October 2024.

The inspiration for the lyrics came about as Gilmour was learning to fly aeroplanes at the time of the recording, often spending time in the air during the mornings before arriving at the studio in the afternoon. It has also been interpreted as a metaphor for beginning something new, experiencing a radical change in life, or, more specifically, Gilmour's feelings about striking out as the new leader of Pink Floyd after the departure of Roger Waters. Gilmour stated on Westwood One's Pink Floyd 25th Anniversary Special in 1992 that "we were, as Pink Floyd, learning to fly again." Also an avid pilot, drummer Nick Mason's voice can be heard at around the middle of the song. "Learning to Fly" was included on Pink Floyd's greatest hits collection Echoes: The Best of Pink Floyd.

The track was regularly performed live on the band's two post-Roger Waters tours, with touring guitarist Tim Renwick playing the song's guitar solos (although David Gilmour played the solos on the studio version of the track). A live version is included on Delicate Sound of Thunder and Pulse. At the end of the final solo in both versions, a guitar lick from the second verse of The Wall's "Young Lust" ("Oooh, baby set me free") is played.

In Ultimate Classic Rock's retrospective ranking of the Pink Floyd catalogue, "Learning To Fly" was ranked 41 of 167 and 2nd-best of post-Waters era.

== Music video ==
The music video was directed by Storm Thorgerson, a long-time collaborator of Pink Floyd who had designed many of their album covers. It was filmed in a farm field just South of Black Diamond, Alberta, Canada and also on West Wind Ridge, a mountain in Kananaskis Country near Canmore, located some 50 to 75 kilometres (30 to 50 mi) west of the city of Calgary, Alberta during rehearsals for the band's A Momentary Lapse of Reason Tour. The video combined performances of the band with an Indigenous man (played by Canadian actor Lawrence Bayne), working in a field who then runs and jumps off a cliff to turn into a Harris's Hawk. The footage of the stage show shows the band performing "Learning to Fly" but features the more colourful light-show used for live performances of "One of These Days". The red/orange aeroplane is a Beechcraft Model 17 Staggerwing.

The original video also depicts a factory worker who turns into an aeroplane pilot, as well as a child who breaks free from his mother and dives off a cliff into a deep river, swimming away.

The video went to No. 9 on MTV's Video Countdown in November 1987 and was the No. 60 video of MTV's Top 100 Videos of 1987. The video won the band its only MTV Video Music Award for "Best Concept Video" in 1988.

== Personnel ==
Pink Floyd

- David Gilmour – lead and backing vocals, electric guitar, sequencer
- Nick Mason – drums, spoken words, sound effects

Additional musicians:

- Richard Wright – keyboards, backing vocals
- Jon Carin – keyboards
- Bob Ezrin – sequencer, percussion
- Tony Levin – bass guitar
- Steve Forman – percussion
- Darlene Koldenhoven – backing vocals
- Carmen Twillie – backing vocals
- Phyllis St. James – backing vocals
- Donny Gerrard – backing vocals

== Charts ==
=== Weekly charts ===
| Chart (1987) | Peak position |
|---|---|
| Australia (Australian Music Report) | 34 |
| France (SNEP) | 60 |
| Italy Airplay (Music & Media) | 8 |
| New Zealand (Recorded Music NZ) | 10 |
| US Billboard Hot 100 | 70 |
| US Cashbox Top 100 | 82 |
| US Mainstream Rock (Billboard) | 1 |
| West Germany (GfK) | 71 |

== Certifications ==
Certifications for "Learning to Fly"
| Region | Certification | Certified units/sales |
|---|---|---|
| New Zealand (RMNZ) | Platinum | 30,000^{‡} |
^{‡} Sales+streaming figures based on certification alone.

== See also ==
- List of number-one mainstream rock hits (United States)
