= Darlene Koldenhoven =

American vocalist, pianist

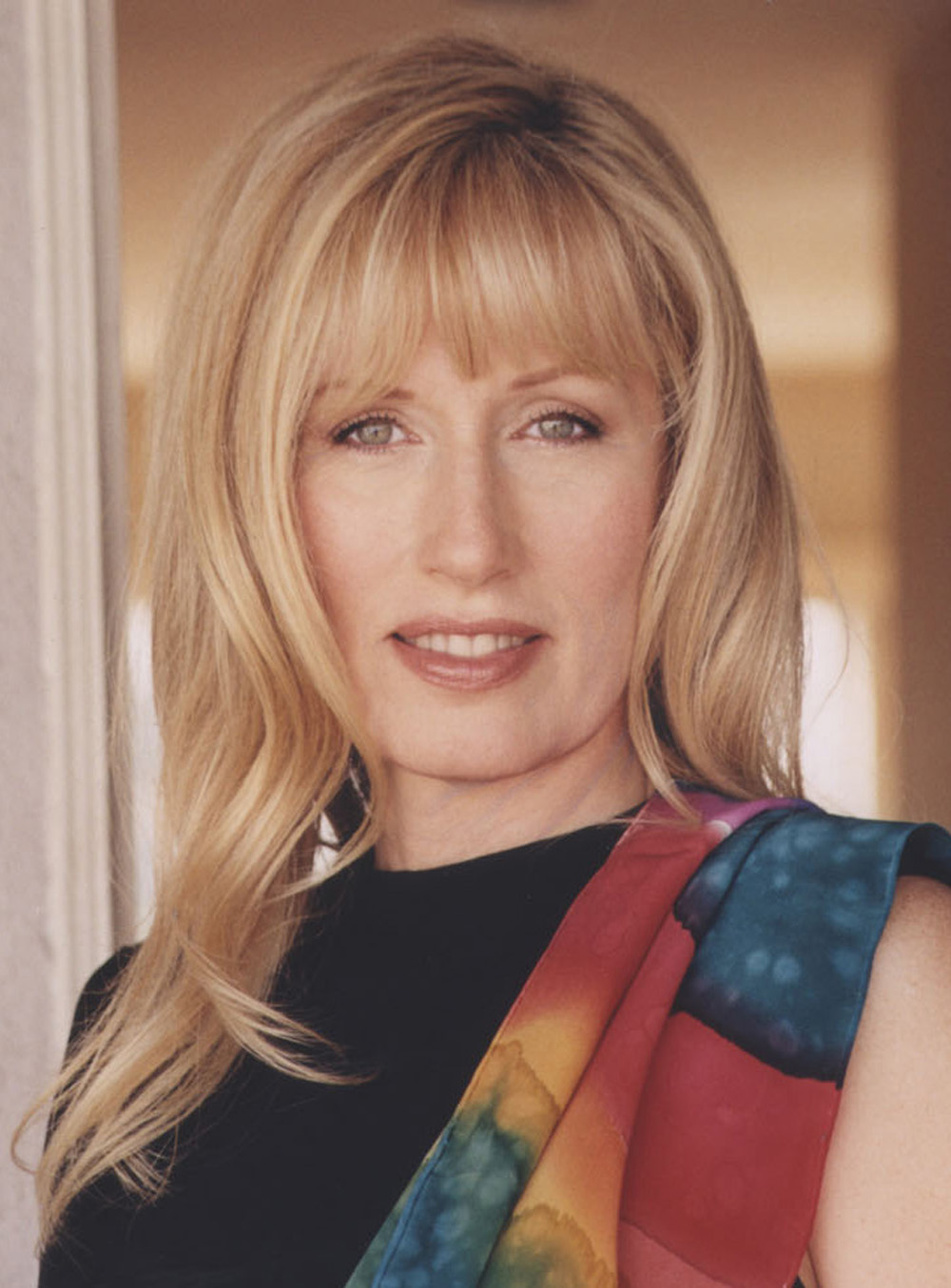

Background information
- Born: Chicago, Illinois, U.S.
- Genres: Classical crossover; New-age; jazz; ambient; salsa; Latin
- Occupations: Vocalist; pianist; songwriter
- Instrument: Vocals
- Labels: TimeArt Recordings
- Website: darlenekoldenhoven.com

Darlene Koldenhoven is an American Grammy Award-winning vocalist, pianist, composer, songwriter, arranger, and author. In 2021, her solo piano album The Grand Piano Spa debuted at No. 4 on Billboard's Classical Crossover Albums Chart, followed by The Grand Piano Spa: Legacy debuting at No. 8 on the same chart. She has performed onstage with such artists as Yanni, David Byrne and Ricky Kej; and she has provided vocals on albums by Pink Floyd, Neil Young, Celine Dion, and Kenny Loggins. As an actress, she has been featured in Sister Act, Sister Act 2: Back in the Habit, Spy Hard, the Young and the Restless, and Malcom in the Middle.

== Early life and education ==
Darlene Koldenhoven was born and raised in Chicago, Illinois. She began singing at age 3 and started taking piano lessons at age 9. She graduated from Chicago Christian High School, and at age 19 performed a solo with the Chicago Symphony Orchestra and for the Lyric Opera Guild of Chicago. Koldenhoven received a bachelor's degree in Music Education and a master's degree in Vocal Performance from The Chicago Conservatory College. She taught elementary school music in Chicago for six years, then moved to Los Angeles in 1978 to pursue a career in music.

== Career ==
After moving to Los Angeles, Koldenhoven made a name for herself in the music industry in 1982 by earning a Grammy Award nomination for Best Jazz Vocal Performance, Duo, or Group as lead soprano with the musical group Clare Fisher's 2+2. In the early 1980s she began singing on albums by artists such as Pink Floyd, Rod Stewart, Neil Young, Ringo Starr, Kenny Loggins, Whitney Houston, Celine Dion, and Lionel Richie. In 1987, she won a Grammy Award for Best Jazz Vocal Performance, Duo, or Group. In 1994, Koldenhoven performed "Aria" as a featured soprano soloist on Yanni, Live at the Acropolis. She has also shared the stage with Barbra Streisand, Bette Midler, and David Byrne.

As a singing actress, Koldenhoven has been featured in Sister Act, and Sister Act 2: Back in the Habit, Spy Hard, and Malcom in the Middle. She was a solo vocalist in an on-camera role in the Young and the Restless, performing "The Prayer", and provided the singing voice for Julianne Moore, singing "Why Do I Lie" in the film Cast a Deadly Spell. Koldenhoven has been a solo vocalist in films including Body of Evidence, Internal Affairs, and The Crow. As a choir singer she has provided vocals for What About Bob? and others. Koldenhoven contributed vocals for the video games Harry Potter and the Chamber of Secrets and Baldur's Gate: Dark Alliance.

Koldenhoven wrote the book Tune Your Voice: Singing and Your Mind's Musical Ear (high voice and low voice versions).

== Personal life ==
Koldenhoven lives in Los Angeles, where she takes care of adopted rescue animals.

== Discography ==
Solo albums

- 1993 – Keys to the World
- 1996 – Free to Serve
- 2000 – Heavenly Peace
- 2007 – Infinite Voice
- 2011 – Inspired by a True Story
- 2011 – Solitary Treasures
- 2013 – Tranquil Times
- 2017 – Color Me Home
- 2018 – Chromatones
- 2021 – The Grand Piano Spa
- 2021 – The Grand Piano Spa: Legacy
- 2022 – Traveling the Blissful Highway

Other albums

- 1981 – Clare Fischer – 2+2 – lead soprano
- 1985 – Crystal Gayle – Nobody Wants to Be Alone – backing vocals
- 1984 – Tom Jones – Love is on the Radio – backing vocals
- 1985 – Rod Stewart – Every Beat of My Heart – backing vocals
- 1987 – Pink Floyd – A Momentary Lapse of Reason – backing vocals
- 1990 – REO Speedwagon – The Earth, a Small Man, His Dog and a Chicken – backing vocals
- 1991 – Kenny Loggins – Leap of Faith – backing vocals
- 1992 – Ringo Starr – Time Takes Time – backing vocals
- 1992 – Lionel Richie – Back to Front – backing vocals
- 1994 – Yanni – Live at the Acropolis – lead vocals
- 1998 – Celine Dion – These Are Special Times – backing vocals
- 2002 – Neil Young – Living with War – backing vocals

== Awards ==
Year	Nominated work	Category	Award	Result
1982	Clare Fischer Presents 2+2	Best Jazz Vocal Performance, Duo, or Group	Grammy Award	Nominated
1983	One Night in A Dream	Best Jazz Vocal Performance, Duo, or Group	Grammy Award	Nominated
1987	Free Fall	Best Jazz Vocal Performance, Duo, or Group	Grammy Award	Won
2017	Until	Best New Age Song/Best Soprano Soloist	Global Music Awards (Gold Medal)	Won
2017	Ode To Our Orb	New Age/Ambient	Hollywood Music in Media Award	Nominated
2019	Vibrant Worlds	Best Easy Listening Recording	Indie Music Channel Award	Won
2019	Golden Dawn	Best Songwriter (all genres)	Indie Music Channel Award	Won
2019	Lifetime Achievement Award	Hall of Fame Inductee	Indie Music Channel Award	Won
2021	Wisteria	Contemporary Classical	Hollywood Music in Media Award	Nominated
2022	Traveling the Blissful Highway	New Age - Production/Producer (Gold Medal)	Global Music Award (Gold Medal)	Won
2022	Cheerful Mohana	New Age/Ambient	Hollywood Music in Media Award	Nominated
2023	Cheerful Mohana	Best of Pangea/New Age	InterContinental Music Award	Won
2023	Best in Music Genre	Best New Age/Ambient	Hollywood Independent Music Award	Nominated
