= Jon Carin =

American musician (born 1964)

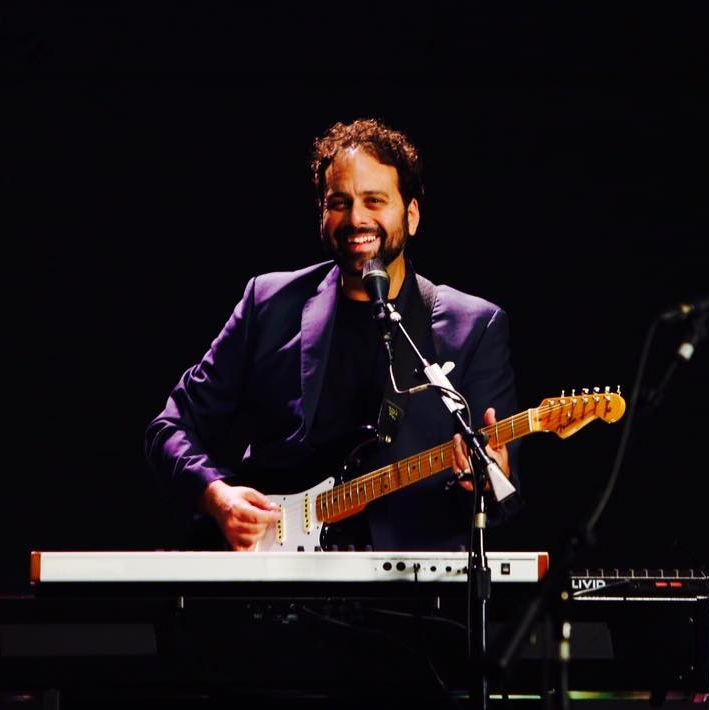
- Carin in 2015

Background information
- Born: October 21, 1964 (age 62); New York City, U.S.
- Genres: Pop; synth-pop; new wave; hard rock; progressive rock; alternative rock
- Occupations: Musician; artist; producer; singer-songwriter; engineer
- Instruments: Vocals; keyboards; guitar; lap steel guitar; bass; drums
- Years active: 1981–present
- Member of: Richard Butler band; Pink Floyd; David Gilmour band; Industry; The Who; The Bleeding Heart Band
- Website: joncarin.com

Jon Carin (born October 21, 1964) is an American musician, singer, songwriter and producer. He has collaborated with acts including Pink Floyd, Roger Waters, David Gilmour, the Who, Pete Townshend, Psychedelic Furs, Kate Bush, the Dream Academy and Richard Butler.

== Biography ==
As a teenager, Jon Carin started his career with the band Industry as their lead singer, keyboardist and songwriter. During his time with the band, they had a hit single with "State of the Nation" in 1983, being followed by the album Stranger to Stranger.

In 1983, he was asked by Industry's producer, Rhett Davies, to work with Bryan Ferry for his Boys and Girls album. Later in 1985, he joined Bryan Ferry at Live Aid, where he first played with Pink Floyd guitarist David Gilmour.

In 1985, Carin collaborated with Gilmour in the sessions for what would eventually become Pink Floyd's album A Momentary Lapse of Reason (1987). He received credit as a songwriter for co-writing "Learning to Fly, based on a song of his. He contributed the keyboards and drum track for that song and many others on the album." He participated in the support tour for the album, performing alongside returning keyboardist Richard Wright, and appeared on the 1988 Pink Floyd double live album, Delicate Sound of Thunder. In 1992, Carin participated in the recording of the soundtrack for La Carrera Panamericana. Two years later, in 1994, Carin contributed keyboards to Pink Floyd's album The Division Bell (1994). He also participated on the Division Bell tour and was featured on the Pulse CD and DVD.

Carin performed with the Who, playing Quadrophenia in its entirety in 1996, at London's Hyde Park, which led to an extensive tour throughout much of 1996–97.

On August 16, 1998, he produced and played keyboards and drums for Pete Townshend for a concert to raise money for the Maryville Academy. In 1999, a CD of this concert was released, being produced by Carin.

Throughout the late 1990s and early 2000s, Carin was on tour with former Pink Floyd leader, Roger Waters, for his In the Flesh tour.

In October 2001, Carin performed with the Who at the Concert for New York City, a tribute concert to the lives lost on September 11.

He performed keyboards, Lap Steel guitar and vocals with Pink Floyd at their reunion with Roger Waters on July 2, 2005, for Live 8 at Hyde Park.

Carin played with David Gilmour in the 2006 tour, in support of On an Island. From June 2006, he played on Waters' The Dark Side of the Moon Live tour, with dates in 2007 and 2008.

In 2006, Carin worked on the self-titled solo album by The Psychedelic Furs' frontman Richard Butler titled Richard Butler (album). He wrote, arranged and played all of the instrumental parts, as well as producing and engineering the album.

On May 10, 2007, Carin was one of the performers at the Syd Barrett tribute concert, "Madcap's Last Laugh", at the Barbican Centre in London, performing with Roger Waters and – separately – the members of Pink Floyd (billed as Rick Wright, David Gilmour and Nick Mason) as well as with Captain Sensible. Two months later, Carin performed on keyboards, guitar and lead vocals with Roger Waters at the Live Earth event on July 7, 2007, at Giants Stadium in New Jersey.

Carin performed with Roger Waters tour "The Wall 2010–2013 Live" on keyboards, guitars, lap steel, vocals and programming.

In 2014, Carin performed keyboards, programming, guitar and vocals in Kate Bush's Before the Dawn concert series at Hammersmith Apollo, her first live shows in 35 years resulting in the Before the Dawn (Kate Bush album) live album. He contributed to David Gilmour’s Rattle That Lock album, playing keyboards in 2015. Carin performed with Gilmour on his Rattle That Lock World Tour 2015–16.

In Autumn 2016, he performed with Waters on a tour of Mexico culminating in a free concert in Zocolo Square for 200,000 people. He then played with Roger Waters at the historic Desert Trip event in Coachella along with artists, Bob Dylan, Paul McCartney, The Who, Rolling Stones, and Neil Young.

In 2018, he performed keyboards, guitars, lap steel, programming and vocals in the 157-show Us + Them Tour with Roger Waters.

Carin was on tour with Waters' in 2022 and 2023 on his This Is Not a Drill tour, including the two London shows performing Waters' reimagined The Dark Side of the Moon Redux.

== Selected discography and tours ==
Industry

- State of the Nation (EP)
- Stranger to Stranger
- State of the Nation

Pink Floyd

- A Momentary Lapse of Reason
- Learning to Fly
- On the Turning Away
- A Momentary Lapse of Reason Tour
- Pink Floyd in Venice: A Concert for Europe
- Delicate Sound of Thunder
- Knebworth '90
- La Carrera Panamericana (soundtrack for the film)
- Shine On
- The Division Bell
- Take It Back
- High Hopes
- The Division Bell Tour
- Pulse
- Echoes: The Best of Pink Floyd
- Oh, By The Way
- The Best of Pink Floyd: A Foot in the Door
- The Division Bell 20th Anniversary Box Set
- Discovery (Pink Floyd box set)
- The Endless River
- The Later Years 1987–2019
- Live At Knebworth 1990

Roger Waters

- In the Flesh Live
- In the Flesh
- Flickering Flame: The Solo Years Vol. 1
- Live Earth
- 12-12-12: The Concert for Sandy Relief
- The Dark Side of the Moon Live
- Roger Waters: The Wall
- The Wall Live (2010–2013)
- Roger Waters: Us + Them
- Us + Them Tour
- The Lockdown Sessions (2022)
- The Dark Side of the Moon Redux 2023
- This Is Not a Drill
- Roger Waters: This Is Not a Drill – Live from Prague

David Gilmour

- On an Island (Bonus DVD with AOL Sessions and Albert Hall footage)
- On an Island Tour
- Remember That Night: Live at Royal Albert Hall (DVD)
- Live in Gdańsk
- Rattle That Lock
- Rattle That Lock Tour
- Live at Pompeii

Live Aid

Bryan Ferry (w/ Chester Kamen as backing guitarist) || "Sensation"
"Boys and Girls"
"Slave to Love br />"Jealous Guy"

The Who

- The Concert for New York City [Disc 2, tracks 2–4] (2001)
- Amazing Journey: The Story of The Who [Track 14] (2008)
- Tommy and Quadrophenia Live

Pete Townshend

- A Benefit for Maryville Academy
- Lifehouse
- Live: The Empire
- Live: The Fillmore
- Lifehouse Chronicles
- Lifehouse Elements

Kate Bush

- Before the Dawn (Kate Bush concert series)
- Little Shrew - Animation

Richard Butler

- Richard Butler

Trashmonk

- Mona Lisa Overdrive

Dream Academy

- A Different Kind of Weather
- Somewhere in the Sun... Best of the Dream Academy
- The Morning Lasted All Day: A Retrospective

Martha Wainwright

- Martha Wainwright

Bryan Ferry

- Boys and Girls (album)
- Slave to Love
- Windswept (song)
- Live Aid
- More Than This: The Best of Bryan Ferry & Roxy Music
- Street Life: 20 Great Hits

Bryan Ferry with Roxy Music

- The Ultimate Collection

Soul Asylum

- Candy from a Stranger
- Black Gold: The Best of Soul Asylum

The Psychedelic Furs

- Midnight to Midnight
- Pretty in Pink
- All of This and Nothing
- Made of Rain

Gipsy Kings

- Compas
- ¡Volaré! The Very Best of the Gipsy Kings

Live

- Secret Samadhi

David Broza

- Night Dawn, The Unpublished Poetry of Townes Van Zandt

Fields of the Nephilim

- Elizium

Kashmir

- The Good Life

Escape Club

- Wild Wild West (album)

Peter Perrett

- How The West Was Won

Corey Feldman

- Angelic 2 the Core
