= Carmen Twillie (actress) =

American actress and singer

- Occupations: Actress; singer
- Years active: 1978–present

Carmen Twillie is an American actress and singer.

== Career ==
Twillie is a longtime friend of Tommy Morgan and has appeared as guest contralto soloist with Morgan's choir. She is best known for singing the Elton John and Tim Rice song "Circle of Life" in the beginning of the 1994 Disney animated feature film The Lion King. She provided the singing voice of Stormella in the 1998 Christmas animated film Rudolph the Red-Nosed Reindeer: The Movie and she was a singer in the 1997 animated film Cats Don't Dance. She did a few small voice roles in the 1993 stop-motion animated film The Nightmare Before Christmas as the Undersea Gal and the Creature under the bed. She also appeared on the Chowder episode "Sing Beans" doing one of the voices for the sing beans alongside voice actors Jess Harnell, John DiMaggio, and Tara Strong.

She also is a backup singer, having appeared on several albums released by artists such as Celine Dion, Whitney Houston, Dionne Warwick and Pink Floyd for their 1987 album A Momentary Lapse of Reason.

== Filmography ==
=== Film ===
Year	Title	Role	Notes
1983	The Young Landlords	—N/a	Voice
1989	Little Nemo: Adventures in Slumberland	Singer (uncredited)	Voice
1990	Solar Crisis	Arm Band Singer	
1991	Mobsters	Blues Singer	
1993	The Nightmare Before Christmas	Man Under the Bed; Undersea Gal	Voice
1994	The Swan Princess	Chorus	Voice
1994	Disney Sing-Along Songs: Circle of Life	Circle of Life Performer	Short; Voice
1995	Vampire in Brooklyn	Singer	
1997	A Walton Easter	Choir Leader	
1997	Disney Sing-Along Songs: Collection of All-Time Favorites - The Modern Classics	—N/a	Voice
1997	Beauty and the Beast: The Enchanted Christmas	Chorus (singing voice)	Direct-to-video; Voice
1998	Rudolph the Red-Nosed Reindeer: The Movie	Stormella (singing voice)	Voice
1998	An All Dogs Christmas Carol	Additional Voices	Direct-to-video; Voice
2001	The Flintstones: On the Rocks	Tenor Singer	TV movie Voice
2002	Dark Blue	Church Choir Singer	
2003	Gold Diggers	Gospel Singer	
2006	Rugrats Tales from the Crib: Three Jacks and a Beanstalk	Chorus	Voice
2007	Norbit	Choir Member	
2007	License to Wed	St. Augustine's Choir	
2010	Queen Victoria's Wedding	Mona	Short
2011	The Lion King Read-Along	—N/a	Voice
2014	Carmen Twillie Feat. Lebo M: Circle of Life	Herself	Music video
2017	Warped	Mrs. Washington	Short

=== Television ===
Year	Title	Role	Notes
1991-1992	Hammerman	Additional voices	11 episodes
1994	My So-Called Life	Church Choir	1 episode
1998	Nothing Sacred	Singing Nun #3	1 episode
2004	Johnny Bravo	Hot Babe #2	1 episode Voice
2004	Six Feet Under	"O Happy Day" Singer	1 episode
2006	VeggieTales	Choir (voice)	1 episode
2006	The Kennedy Center Honors: A Celebration of the Performing Arts	Singer	TV special
2007	Chowder	Singing Bean #2	1 episode Voice
2015	Marry Me	Female Patient Singer	1 episode
