= 2022 World Figure Skating Championships =

International figure skating competition

- Type: ISU Championship
- Date: 21 – 27 March 2022
- Season: 2021–22
- Location: Montpellier, France
- Host: French Federation of Ice Sports
- Venue: Sud de France Arena

Champions
- Men's singles: (Japan) Shoma Uno
- Women's singles: (Japan) Kaori Sakamoto
- Pairs: (United States) Alexa Knierim and Brandon Frazier
- Ice dance: (France) Gabriella Papadakis and Guillaume Cizeron
- Previous: 2021 World Championships
- Next: 2023 World Championships

The 2022 World Figure Skating Championships were held from 21 to 27 March 2022, at the Sud de France Arena in Montpellier, France. Sanctioned by the International Skating Union (ISU), the World Championships are considered the most prestigious event in figure skating. Medals were awarded in men's singles, women's singles, pair skating, and ice dance. The competition determined the entry quotas for each skating federation at the 2023 World Championships. Shoma Uno and Kaori Sakamoto, both of Japan, won the men's and women's events, respectively. Alexa Knierim and Brandon Frazier of the United States won the pairs event, and Gabriella Papadakis and Guillaume Cizeron of France won the ice dance event.

== Background ==
The World Figure Skating Championships are considered the most prestigious event in figure skating. The 2022 World Figure Skating Championships were held from 21 to 27 March 2022, at the Sud de France Arena in Montpellier, France. The 2022 World Championships were notable for a number of absences following the 2022 Winter Olympics. Reigning World and Olympic champion Nathan Chen of the United States and two-time World and Olympic champion Yuzuru Hanyu of Japan bowed out, citing injuries. Additionally, the Chinese Skating Association opted not to send any skaters to the competition.

=== Ban of Russian and Belarusian figure skaters ===
In 2016, an independent report commissioned by the World Anti-Doping Agency (WADA) confirmed allegations that the Russian Olympic team had been involved in a state-sponsored doping program, active from at least late 2011 through August 2015. On 9 December 2019, the WADA banned Russia from all international competitions after it found that data provided by the Russian Anti-Doping Agency had been manipulated by Russian authorities in order to protect athletes involved in its state-sponsored doping scheme. Under the ban imposed by the Court of Arbitration for Sport, Russian athletes could not use the Russian flag or anthem in international competition and had to present themselves as "Neutral Athletes" or a "Neutral Team" at any world championships. On 19 February 2022, Anna Shcherbakova stated her intention to compete at the World Championships after winning the Olympic gold medal.

After the 2022 Russian invasion of Ukraine, Nathalie Péchalat, then-president of the French Federation of Ice Sports, announced that no Russian or Belarusian athletes would be allowed to compete at the World Championships in France due to travel restrictions imposed by the French government, with no official word from the International Skating Union (ISU) as to whether the ban would extend further. When Péchalat's announcement was made, there were discussions about Russian skaters trying to attend the World Championships by flying into neighboring countries and traveling to Montpellier by road. On 1 March 2022, the ISU banned all Russian and Belarusian skaters from participating in any international skating events. These World Championships became the first major sporting event around the world, excluding the 2022 Winter Paralympics, to proceed with a Russian and Belarusian ban.

== Qualification ==
The number of entries from each nation for the 2022 World Championships was based on the results of the 2021 World Championships. These nations were eligible to enter more than one skater or team in the indicated disciplines.

Number of entries per discipline
Spots	Men	Women	Pairs	Ice dance
3	Japan; United States	Japan; United States	China	Canada; United States
2	Canada; France; Italy; South Korea	Austria; Belgium; South Korea	Canada; Italy; Japan; United States	Great Britain; Italy

== Changes to preliminary entries ==
The International Skating Union published the initial list of entrants on 2 March 2022.

Changes to preliminary entries
Date	Discipline	Withdrew	Added	Reason	Ref.
1 March	Men	(Japan); Yuzuru Hanyu	(Japan); Kao Miura	Injury	
2 March	Women	—N/a	(Belgium); Loena Hendrickx	Error by the Belgian Figure Skating Federation	
2 March	Pairs	(Canada); Kirsten Moore-Towers; Michael Marinaro	(Canada); Evelyn Walsh; Trennt Michaud	Personal reasons (Moore-Towers)	
3 March	Men	(Bulgaria); Larry Loupolover	—N/a		
3 March	Ice dance	(Poland); Natalia Kaliszek; Maksym Spodyriev	(Poland); Anastasia Polibina; Pavel Golovishnikov	Positive COVID-19 test	
8 March	Men	(Czech Republic); Georgii Reshtenko	—N/a	Chose to focus on the 2022 World Junior Championships	
12 March	Pairs	(Georgia (country)); Anastasiia Metelkina; Daniil Parkman	(Georgia (country)); Karina Safina; Luka Berulava	—N/a	
12 March	Ice dance	(Israel); Mariia Nosovitskaya; Mikhail Nosovitskiy	(Israel); Shira Ichilov; Volodymyr Byelikov	—N/a	
13 March	Men	(Armenia); Slavik Hayrapetyan	—N/a	Injury	
14 March	Women	(Ukraine); Anastasiia Shabotova	—N/a	Expulsion from Ukrainian national team	
14 March	Pairs	(Czech Republic); Jelizaveta Žuková; Martin Bidař	—N/a	Injury (Žuková)	
16 March	Men	(United States); Nathan Chen	(United States); Camden Pulkinen	Injury	
17 March	Men	(Japan); Kao Miura	(Japan); Kazuki Tomono	Injury	
17 March	Women	(South Korea); Kim Ye-lim	(South Korea); Lee Hae-in	Positive COVID-19 test	
21 March	Men	(Kazakhstan); Mikhail Shaidorov	—N/a	Denied visa by the French embassy	
21 March	Men	(Switzerland); Lukas Britschgi	—N/a	Positive COVID-19 test	
21 March	Ice dance	(Germany); Jennifer Janse van Rensburg; Benjamin Steffan	—N/a	Positive COVID-19 test (Steffan)	
22 March	Pairs	(Australia); Anastasia Golubeva; Hektor Giotopoulos Moore	—N/a	—N/a	
22 March	Pairs	(Italy); Sara Conti; Niccolò Macii	—N/a	Positive COVID-19 test (Macii)	
22 March	Pairs	(Italy); Rebecca Ghilardi; Filippo Ambrosini	—N/a	Positive COVID-19 test (Ghilardi)	

== Required performance elements ==
=== Single skating ===
Women competing in single skating first performed their short programs on Wednesday, 23 March, while men performed theirs on Thursday, 24 March. Lasting no more than 2 minutes 40 seconds, the short program had to include the following elements:

For men: one double or triple Axel; one triple or quadruple jump; one jump combination consisting of a double jump and a triple jump, two triple jumps, or a quadruple jump and a double jump or triple jump; one flying spin; one camel spin or sit spin with a change of foot; one spin combination with a change of foot; and a step sequence using the full ice surface.

For women: one double or triple Axel; one triple jump; one jump combination consisting of a double jump and a triple jump, or two triple jumps; one flying spin; one layback spin, sideways leaning spin, camel spin, or sit spin without a change of foot; one spin combination with a change of foot; and one step sequence using the full ice surface.

The top 24 skaters after completion of the short program component of the competition moved on to the free skating component. Women performed their free skates on Friday, 25 March; men performed theirs on Saturday, 26 March. The free skate performance for both men and women could last no more than 4 minutes, and had to include the following: seven jump elements, of which one had to be an Axel-type jump; three spins, of which one had to be a spin combination, one had to be a flying spin, and one had to be a spin with only one position; a step sequence; and a choreographic sequence.

=== Pair skating ===
Couples competing in pair skating performed their short programs on Wednesday, 23 March. Lasting no more than 2 minutes 40 seconds, it had to include the following elements: one pair lift, one twist lift, one double or triple throw jump, one double or triple solo jump, one solo spin combination with a change of foot, one death spiral, and a step sequence using the full ice surface.

The top 20 couples after completion of the short program component moved on to the free skating component, which were performed on Thursday, 24 March. The free skate performance could last no more than 4 minutes, and had to include the following: three pair lifts, of which one had to be a twist lift; two different throw jumps; one solo jump; one jump combination or sequence; one pair spin combination; one death spiral; and a choreographic sequence.

=== Ice dance ===
Couples competing in ice dance performed their rhythm dances on Friday, 25 March. Lasting no more than 2 minutes 50 seconds, the theme of the rhythm dance this season was "street dance rhythms". Examples of applicable dance styles included, but were not limited, to: hip-hop, disco, swing, krump, popping, funk, jazz, reggae (reggaeton), and blues. The required pattern dance element was the Midnight Blues. The rhythm dance had to include the following elements: the pattern dance, the pattern dance step sequence, one dance lift, one set of sequential twizzles, and one step sequence.

The top 20 couples after the rhythm dance moved on to the free dance, which was held on Saturday, 26 March. The free dance performance could last no longer than 4 minutes, and had to include the following: three dance lifts, one dance spin, one set of synchronized twizzles, one step sequence in hold, one step sequence while on one skate and not touching, and three choreographic elements, of which one had to be a choreographic character step sequence.

== Judging ==
For the 2021–2022 season, all of the technical elements in any figure skating performance – such as jumps, spins, and lifts – were assigned a predetermined base point value and were then scored by a panel of nine judges on a scale from −5 to 5 based on their quality of execution. The judging panel's Grade of Execution (GOE) was determined by calculating the trimmed mean (that is, an average after deleting the highest and lowest scores), and this GOE was added to the base value to come up with the final score for each element. The panel's scores for all elements were added together to generate a total element score. At the same time, judges evaluated each performance based on five program components – skating skills, transitions, performance, composition, and interpretation of the music – and assigned a score from .25 to 10 in .25 point increments. The judging panel's final score for each program component was also determined by calculating the trimmed mean. Those scores were then multiplied by the factor shown on the following chart; the results were added together to generate a total program component score.

Program component factoring
Discipline	Short program or Rhythm dance	Free skate or Free dance
Men	1.00	2.00
Women	0.80	1.60
Pairs	0.80	1.60
Ice dance	0.80	1.20

Deductions were applied for certain violations like time infractions, stops and restarts, or falls. The total element score and total program component score were added together, minus any deductions, to generate a final performance score for each skater or team.

== Medal summary ==
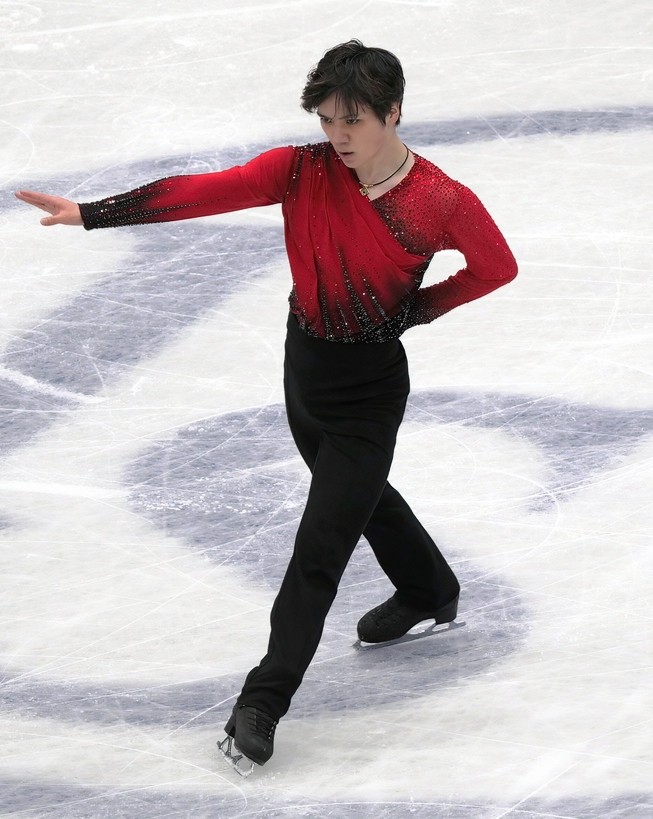
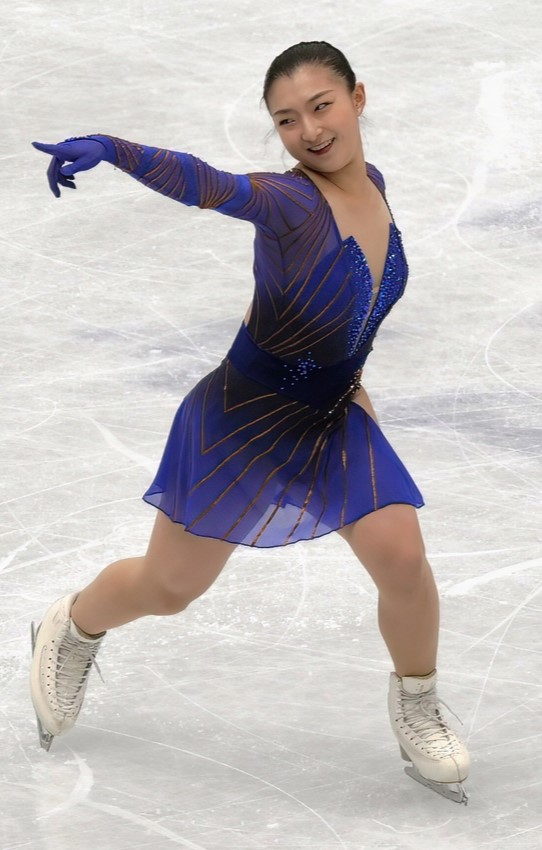
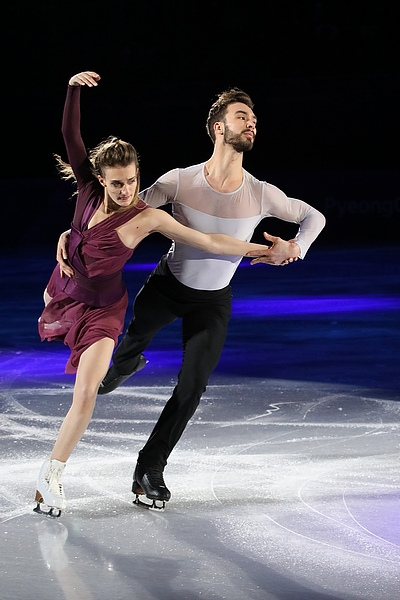
From left to right: The 2022 World Champions: Shoma Uno of Japan (men's singles); Kaori Sakamoto of Japan (women's singles); and Gabriella Papadakis and Guillaume Cizeron of France (ice dance)
Not pictured: Alexa Knierim and Brandon Frazier of the United States (pair skating)

=== Medalists ===
Medals were awarded to the skaters or teams who achieved the highest overall placements in each discipline.

Medal recipients
Discipline	Gold	Silver	Bronze
Men	(Japan); Shoma Uno	(Japan); Yuma Kagiyama	(United States); Vincent Zhou
Women	(Japan); Kaori Sakamoto	(Belgium); Loena Hendrickx	(United States); Alysa Liu
Pairs	(United States); Alexa Knierim; Brandon Frazier	(Japan); Riku Miura; Ryuichi Kihara	(Canada); Vanessa James; Eric Radford
Ice dance	(France); Gabriella Papadakis; Guillaume Cizeron	(United States); Madison Hubbell; Zachary Donohue	(United States); Madison Chock; Evan Bates

Small medals were awarded to the skaters or teams who achieved the highest short program or rhythm dance placements in each discipline.

Small medal recipients for highest short program or rhythm dance
Discipline	Gold	Silver	Bronze
Men	(Japan); Shoma Uno	(Japan); Yuma Kagiyama	(Japan); Kazuki Tomono
Women	(Japan); Kaori Sakamoto	(Belgium); Loena Hendrickx	(United States); Mariah Bell
Pairs	(United States); Alexa Knierim; Brandon Frazier	(United States); Ashley Cain-Gribble; Timothy LeDuc	(Japan); Riku Miura; Ryuichi Kihara
Ice dance	(France); Gabriella Papadakis; Guillaume Cizeron	(United States); Madison Hubbell; Zachary Donohue	(United States); Madison Chock; Evan Bates

Small medals were awarded to the skaters or teams who achieved the highest free skate or free dance placements in each discipline.

Small medal recipients for highest free skate or free dance
Discipline	Gold	Silver	Bronze
Men	(Japan); Shoma Uno	(Japan); Yuma Kagiyama	(United States); Camden Pulkinen
Women	(Japan); Kaori Sakamoto	(Belgium); Loena Hendrickx	(United States); Alysa Liu
Pairs	(United States); Alexa Knierim; Brandon Frazier	(Canada); Vanessa James; Eric Radford	(Japan); Riku Miura; Ryuichi Kihara
Ice dance	(France); Gabriella Papadakis; Guillaume Cizeron	(United States); Madison Hubbell; Zachary Donohue	(United States); Madison Chock; Evan Bates

=== Medals by country ===
Rank	Nation	Gold	Silver	Bronze	Total
1	Japan	2	2	0	4
2	United States	1	1	3	5
3	France	1	0	0	1
4	Belgium	0	1	0	1
5	Canada	0	0	1	1
Totals (5 entries)		4	4	4	12

== Records ==
The following new record high scores were set during this event.

Record high scores
Date	Skater	Disc.	Segment	Score	Ref.
25 March	(France); Gabriella Papadakis; Guillaume Cizeron	Ice dance	Rhythm dance	92.73	
26 March	(France); Gabriella Papadakis; Guillaume Cizeron	Ice dance	Free dance	137.09	
26 March	(France); Gabriella Papadakis; Guillaume Cizeron	Ice dance	Total score	229.82	

== Results ==
=== Men's singles ===
Donovan Carrillo of Mexico had to withdraw prior to the short program when the luggage with his skates did not arrive in time for the competition. Cha Jun-hwan of South Korea withdrew from the free skate due to problems with his boots.

During the short program, one judge received backlash from fans and the media for noting that Ivan Shmuratko of Ukraine had committed a "costume/prop violation" for wearing the Ukrainian national team's training outfit rather than his traditional skating costume. Shmuratko did not receive a deduction due to a majority of the judges' votes being required, while the crowd gave him a standing ovation for his performance.

Shoma Uno of Japan won the gold medal after a free skate that featured a quadruple loop, quadruple Salchow, quadruple flip, and a quadruple toe loop in combination, and his free skate score of 202.85 was a career-best for him. Yuma Kagiyama of Japan won the silver medal, while Vincent Zhou of the United States rallied back from a sixth-place finish in the short program to win the bronze medal.

Men's results
Rank	Skater	Nation	Total	SP		FS	
1st place, gold medalist(s)	Shoma Uno	Japan	312.48	1	109.63	1	202.85
2nd place, silver medalist(s)	Yuma Kagiyama	Japan	297.60	2	105.69	2	191.91
3rd place, bronze medalist(s)	Vincent Zhou	United States	277.38	6	95.84	4	181.54
4	Morisi Kvitelashvili	Georgia	272.03	7	92.61	5	179.42
5	Camden Pulkinen	United States	271.69	12	89.50	3	182.19
6	Kazuki Tomono	Japan	269.37	3	101.12	8	168.25
7	Daniel Grassl	Italy	266.66	5	97.62	7	169.04
8	Adam Siao Him Fa	France	266.12	10	90.97	6	175.15
9	Ilia Malinin	United States	263.79	4	100.16	11	163.63
10	Matteo Rizzo	Italy	255.75	8	91.67	10	164.08
11	Kévin Aymoz	France	245.46	15	85.26	12	160.20
12	Roman Sadovsky	Canada	245.36	18	80.54	9	164.82
13	Deniss Vasiļjevs	Latvia	243.00	11	90.95	14	152.05
14	Keegan Messing	Canada	235.03	9	91.18	17	143.85
15	Mihhail Selevko	Estonia	234.72	20	78.85	13	155.87
16	Vladimir Litvintsev	Azerbaijan	233.62	14	85.83	15	147.79
17	Maurizio Zandron	Austria	228.27	16	83.10	16	145.17
18	Lee Si-hyeong	South Korea	225.06	13	86.35	18	138.71
19	Nikolaj Majorov	Sweden	216.45	19	79.36	20	137.09
20	Graham Newberry	Great Britain	210.40	21	74.92	21	135.48
21	Tomàs-Llorenç Guarino Sabaté	Spain	208.95	24	71.42	19	137.53
22	Nikita Starostin	Germany	205.72	23	73.79	22	131.93
23	Ivan Shmuratko	Ukraine	196.65	22	73.99	23	122.66
WD	Cha Jun-hwan	South Korea	Withdrew	17	82.43	Withdrew from competition	
25	Mark Gorodnitsky	Israel	69.70	25	69.70	Did not advance to free skate	
26	Adam Hagara	Slovakia	60.92	26	60.92	Did not advance to free skate	
27	Vladimir Samoilov	Poland	60.71	27	60.71	Did not advance to free skate	
28	Burak Demirboğa	Turkey	52.86	28	52.86	Did not advance to free skate	
29	Aleksandr Vlasenko	Hungary	51.10	29	51.10	Did not advance to free skate	
WD	Donovan Carrillo	Mexico	Withdrew from competition				

=== Women's singles ===
Kaori Sakamoto of Japan won the gold medal in the women's event, outscoring silver medalist Loena Hendrickx of Belgium by nearly twenty points. Despite an injury, Hendrickx became the first Belgian to win a World Championship medal in the women's event. "I had a lot of pain," Hendrickx stated after the competition, "but I wanted to show one last time that I can do it to finish my season strong." With six triple jumps, Alysa Liu of the United States finished in third place. "I think I did really good. I’m really proud of myself," Liu stated. "I didn’t think I could do better than the Olympics."

Women's results
Rank	Skater	Nation	Total	SP		FS	
1st place, gold medalist(s)	Kaori Sakamoto	Japan	236.09	1	80.32	1	155.77
2nd place, silver medalist(s)	Loena Hendrickx	Belgium	217.70	2	75.00	2	142.70
3rd place, bronze medalist(s)	Alysa Liu	United States	211.19	5	71.91	3	139.28
4	Mariah Bell	United States	208.66	3	72.55	4	136.11
5	You Young	South Korea	204.91	4	72.08	6	132.83
6	Anastasiia Gubanova	Georgia	196.61	14	62.59	5	134.02
7	Lee Hae-in	South Korea	196.55	11	64.16	7	132.39
8	Karen Chen	United States	192.51	8	66.16	8	126.35
9	Ekaterina Ryabova	Azerbaijan	188.50	9	65.52	11	122.98
10	Nicole Schott	Germany	188.42	6	67.77	14	120.65
11	Wakaba Higuchi	Japan	188.15	7	67.03	12	121.12
12	Madeline Schizas	Canada	188.14	10	64.20	10	123.94
13	Ekaterina Kurakova	Poland	186.43	16	61.92	9	124.51
14	Olga Mikutina	Austria	182.98	15	62.14	13	120.84
15	Mana Kawabe	Japan	182.44	12	63.68	15	118.76
16	Niina Petrõkina	Estonia	176.60	17	60.24	16	116.36
17	Lindsay van Zundert	Netherlands	171.39	18	58.49	17	112.90
18	Julia Sauter	Romania	170.31	19	58.07	18	112.24
19	Alexia Paganini	Switzerland	170.02	13	63.09	19	106.93
20	Lara Naki Gutmann	Italy	164.39	20	57.92	20	106.47
21	Josefin Taljegård	Sweden	163.24	21	57.52	21	105.72
22	Kailani Craine	Australia	161.75	22	56.64	22	105.11
23	Natasha McKay	Great Britain	159.27	24	55.71	23	103.56
24	Daša Grm	Slovenia	147.12	23	55.82	24	91.30
25	Jenni Saarinen	Finland	55.30	25	55.30	Did not advance to free skate	
26	Ting Tzu-Han	Chinese Taipei	55.24	26	55.24	Did not advance to free skate	
27	Eliška Březinová	Czech Republic	55.07	27	55.07	Did not advance to free skate	
28	Alexandra Feigin	Bulgaria	55.01	28	55.01	Did not advance to free skate	
29	Léa Serna	France	54.30	29	54.30	Did not advance to free skate	
30	Marilena Kitromilis	Cyprus	53.32	30	53.32	Did not advance to free skate	
31	Júlia Láng	Hungary	47.93	31	47.93	Did not advance to free skate	
32	Stefanie Pesendorfer	Austria	47.23	32	47.23	Did not advance to free skate	
33	Anete Lāce	Latvia	44.60	33	44.60	Did not advance to free skate	

=== Pairs ===
Sofiia Holichenko and Artem Darenskyi of Ukraine chose to withdraw from the free skate due to a lack of training time following the Winter Olympics as well as the Russian invasion of Ukraine.

Ashley Cain-Gribble and Timothy LeDuc of the United States, who were in second place after the short program, were forced to withdraw after Cain-Gribble fell during the free skate and knocked her head against the ice, requiring her to be removed from the ice on a stretcher and hospitalized.

Alexa Knierim and Brandon Frazier of the United States won gold medals; it was the first time that an American pairs team had won the World Championship title since Tai Babilonia and Randy Gardner in 1979. Knierim and Frazier received a career-best score of 144.21 in the free skate and 221.09 overall to win the gold. "I had so many emotions," Knierim stated afterward. "It was so much gratitude, fulfillment, excitement, and disbelief."

Pairs results
Rank	Team	Nation	Total	SP		FS	
1st place, gold medalist(s)	Alexa Knierim; Brandon Frazier	United States	221.09	1	76.88	1	144.21
2nd place, silver medalist(s)	Riku Miura; Ryuichi Kihara	Japan	199.55	3	71.58	3	127.97
3rd place, bronze medalist(s)	Vanessa James; Eric Radford	Canada	197.32	5	66.54	2	130.78
4	Karina Safina; Luka Berulava	Georgia	191.74	4	67.36	4	124.38
5	Minerva Fabienne Hase; Nolan Seegert	Germany	189.61	6	66.29	5	123.32
6	Evelyn Walsh; Trennt Michaud	Canada	176.02	8	60.28	6	115.74
7	Miriam Ziegler; Severin Kiefer	Austria	166.68	7	60.79	7	105.89
8	Camille Kovalev; Pavel Kovalev	France	153.73	9	50.95	8	102.78
9	Daria Danilova; Michel Tsiba	Netherlands	148.55	11	49.52	9	99.03
10	Zoe Jones; Christopher Boyadji	Great Britain	144.24	10	49.67	10	94.57
11	Dorota Broda; Pedro Betegón Martín	Spain	133.58	12	48.66	11	84.92
12	Hailey Kops; Evgeni Krasnopolski	Israel	126.45	14	44.45	12	82.00
WD	Ashley Cain-Gribble; Timothy LeDuc	United States	Withdrew	2	75.85	Withdrew from competition	
WD	Sofiia Holichenko; Artem Darenskyi	Ukraine	Withdrew	13	44.95	Withdrew from competition	

=== Ice dance ===
One day prior to the rhythm dance, the ISU rejected the proposed program by Ukrainian ice dancers Oleksandra Nazarova and Maksym Nikitin. Their program was set to music by Ukrainian artists – "1944" by Jamala and the Ukrainian folk song "Oi u luzi chervona kalyna" performed by Andriy Khlyvnyuk of BoomBox – and included a fifteen-second snippet of a speech by Ukrainian president Volodymyr Zelenskyy in the Ukrainian language calling for peace; the ISU cited the speech portion of the program as "propaganda". Following intervention by their federation, Nazarova and Nikitin were allowed to compete using a version featuring only the music and, like Ivan Shmuratko, they wore the colors of the Ukrainian national team rather than their traditional costumes and received a standing ovation. Despite limited training time leading up to the event, they said that they wanted to perform their new program to "express what they are living through." After the rhythm dance, Mikhail Makarov, president of the Ukrainian Figure Skating Federation, issued an appeal to Jan Dijkema, president of the ISU, and Sergey Bubka, president of the National Olympic Committee of Ukraine, seeking to understand the rationale behind the ISU's decision. Nazarova and Nikitin later withdrew from the free dance, feeling that performing their upbeat program set to music from Moulin Rouge! was inappropriate in light of the Russian invasion of Ukraine.

Gabriella Papadakis and Guillaume Cizeron of France, who were favored to win the ice dance event, broke their own world record scores in the rhythm dance, the free dance, and the overall total, ultimately winning their fifth World Championship title. Cizeron described the experience as "one of the most beautiful competitions of our career." Madison Hubbell and Zachary Donohue of the United States, in what ended up being the last competition of their career, finish second, while Madison Chock and Evan Bates, also of the United States, finished third. "I feel incredibly emotional,” Chock stated afterward. “It was a dream... to be back on the podium after what feels like a very, very long time."

Ice dance results
Rank	Team	Nation	Total	RD		FD	
1st place, gold medalist(s)	Gabriella Papadakis; Guillaume Cizeron	France	229.82	1	92.73	1	137.09
2nd place, silver medalist(s)	Madison Hubbell; Zachary Donohue	United States	222.39	2	89.72	2	132.67
3rd place, bronze medalist(s)	Madison Chock; Evan Bates	United States	216.83	3	87.51	3	129.32
4	Charlène Guignard; Marco Fabbri	Italy	209.92	4	84.22	4	125.70
5	Piper Gilles; Paul Poirier	Canada	202.70	5	80.79	5	121.91
6	Lilah Fear; Lewis Gibson	Great Britain	198.17	7	78.89	6	119.28
7	Olivia Smart; Adrián Díaz	Spain	194.63	6	79.40	7	115.23
8	Kaitlin Hawayek; Jean-Luc Baker	United States	191.61	9	76.56	8	115.05
9	Laurence Fournier Beaudry; Nikolaj Sørensen	Canada	188.54	8	78.29	9	110.25
10	Allison Reed; Saulius Ambrulevičius	Lithuania	180.21	10	74.06	11	106.15
11	Marjorie Lajoie; Zachary Lagha	Canada	178.84	13	70.39	10	108.45
12	Juulia Turkkila; Matthias Versluis	Finland	175.95	12	71.88	12	104.07
13	Natálie Taschlerová; Filip Taschler	Czech Republic	172.23	11	72.55	14	99.68
14	Tina Garabedian; Simon Proulx-Sénécal	Armenia	170.32	14	68.50	13	101.82
15	Maria Kazakova; Georgy Reviya	Georgia	165.38	17	66.76	15	98.62
16	Kana Muramoto; Daisuke Takahashi	Japan	164.25	15	67.77	16	96.48
17	Sasha Fear; George Waddell	Great Britain	160.05	18	66.69	18	93.36
18	Holly Harris; Jason Chan	Australia	159.92	19	64.91	17	95.01
19	Solène Mazingue; Marko Jevgeni Gaidajenko	Estonia	149.04	20	63.97	19	85.07
WD	Oleksandra Nazarova; Maksym Nikitin	Ukraine	Withdrew	16	67.70	Withdrew from competition	
21	Shira Ichilov; Volodymyr Byelikov	Israel	62.57	21	62.57	Did not advance to free dance	
22	Mariia Ignateva; Danijil Szemko	Hungary	62.12	22	62.12	Did not advance to free dance	
23	Jasmine Tessari; Stéphane Walker	Switzerland	60.75	23	60.75	Did not advance to free dance	
24	Charlotte Lafond-Fournier; Richard Kang-in Kam	New Zealand	59.45	24	59.45	Did not advance to free dance	
25	Mária Sofia Pucherová; Nikita Lysak	Slovakia	58.27	25	58.27	Did not advance to free dance	
26	Carolina Moscheni; Francesco Fioretti	Italy	58.21	26	58.22	Did not advance to free dance	
27	Ekaterina Mitrofanova; Vladislav Kasinskij	Bosnia and Herzegovina	55.01	27	55.01	Did not advance to free dance	
28	Anastasia Polibina; Pavel Golovishnikov	Poland	50.73	28	50.73	Did not advance to free dance	
29	Ekaterina Kuznetsova; Oleksandr Kolosovskyi	Azerbaijan	49.14	29	49.14	Did not advance to free dance	
30	Aurelija Ipolito; Luke Russell	Latvia	46.00	30	46.00	Did not advance to free dance	
31	Gaukhar Nauryzova; Boyisangur Datiev	Kazakhstan	45.87	31	45.87	Did not advance to free dance	

== Qualification for 2023 World Championships ==
The number of entries from each nation for the 2023 World Figure Skating Championships was based on the results of the 2022 World Championships. These nations would be eligible to enter more than one skater or team in the indicated disciplines.

Number of entries per discipline
Spots	Men	Women	Pairs	Ice dance
3	Japan; United States	Belgium; Japan; South Korea; United States	Canada; Japan; United States	France; United States
2	Canada; France; Georgia; Italy	Azerbaijan; Georgia; Germany	Austria; France; Georgia; Germany; Great Britain; Netherlands	Canada; Great Britain; Italy; Lithuania; Spain

== Controversy ==
On 23 March, Simon Reed, who was providing commentary for the 2022 World Championships, was caught on a hot mic referring to Meagan Duhamel, two-time world champion in pair skating, as "that bitch from Canada," while his co-host Nicky Slater could be heard laughing in the background. Duhamel had criticized the pair's commentary the day before on social media. As a result, the International Skating Union (ISU) removed both Reed and Slater as commentators for the remainder of the competition, as well as any future ISU events. "There is no place for harassing and abusive language or remarks and behavior in sport and our society," the ISU said in a statement.

== Works cited ==
- "Special Regulations & Technical Rules – Single & Pair Skating and Ice Dance 2021". International Skating Union. Archived from the original on 4 April 2022.
