= Drumquest =

Biannual drumming contest in Ukraine

DrumQuest is a biannual contest for drummers held in Ukraine.

== History ==
DrumQuest was launched in March 2016 by Tobi "Medic Drums" Fatonade, (born Olutobi David Fatonade), a Nigerian drummer endorsed by Starsticks who is currently living and playing in Ukraine. DrumQuest brings together different, talented but previously unknown drummers for a contest to provide a platform for their exposure to the world. The winner also goes home with a prize.

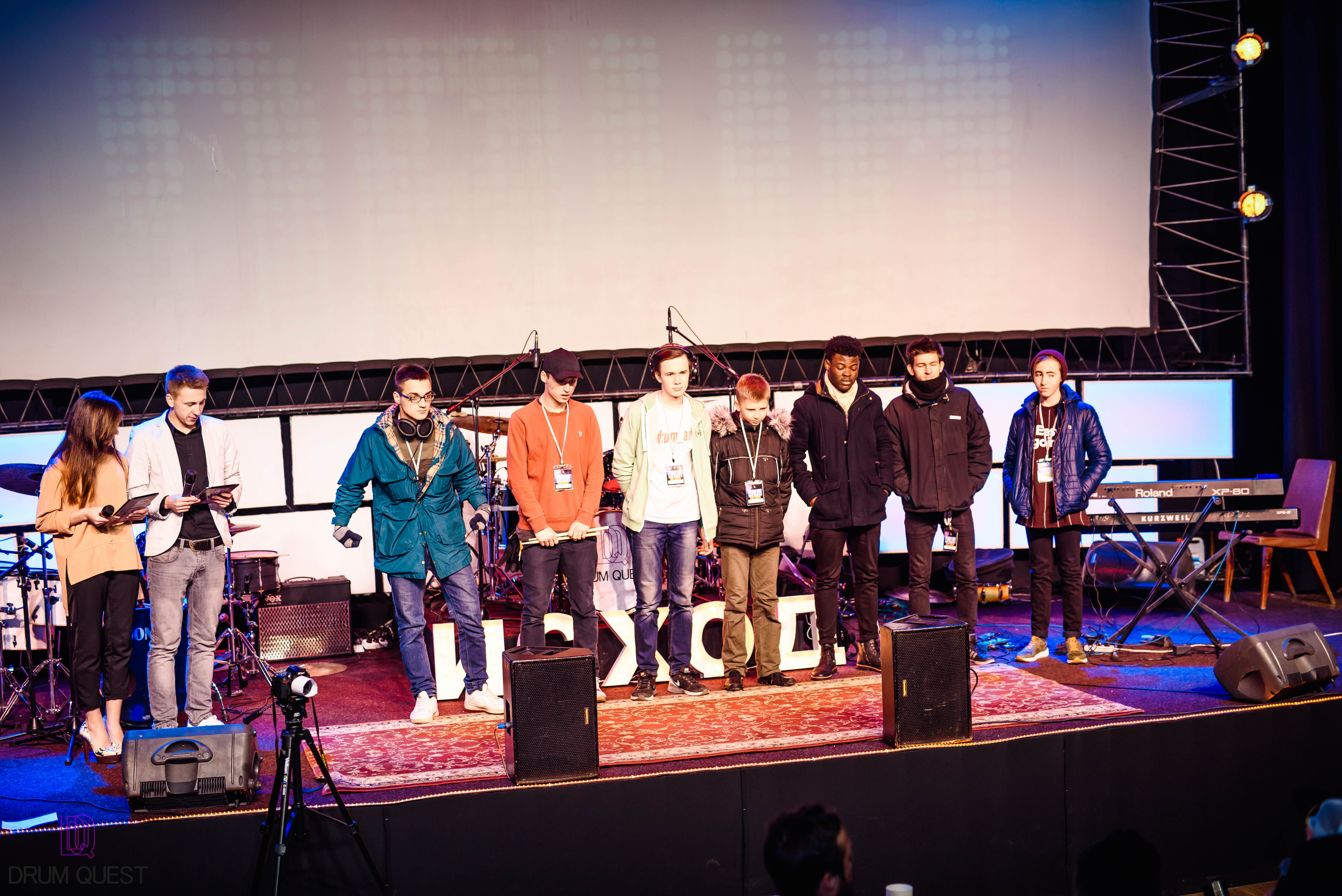
The Contestants at the SECOND edition of DRUMQUEST

DrumQuest, which is currently open to drummers of all ages, also provides an opportunity for young drummers to be mentored by established drummers. DrumQuest has grown to become a bi-annual event and has been touted by some media outlets as "Europe's Biggest Drumming Contest".

=== First edition ===
The first edition of DrumQuest took place between 5 and 12 March 2016 and featured Alexander Lyulyakin, a drummer for Boombox and The Erised as one of the judges.

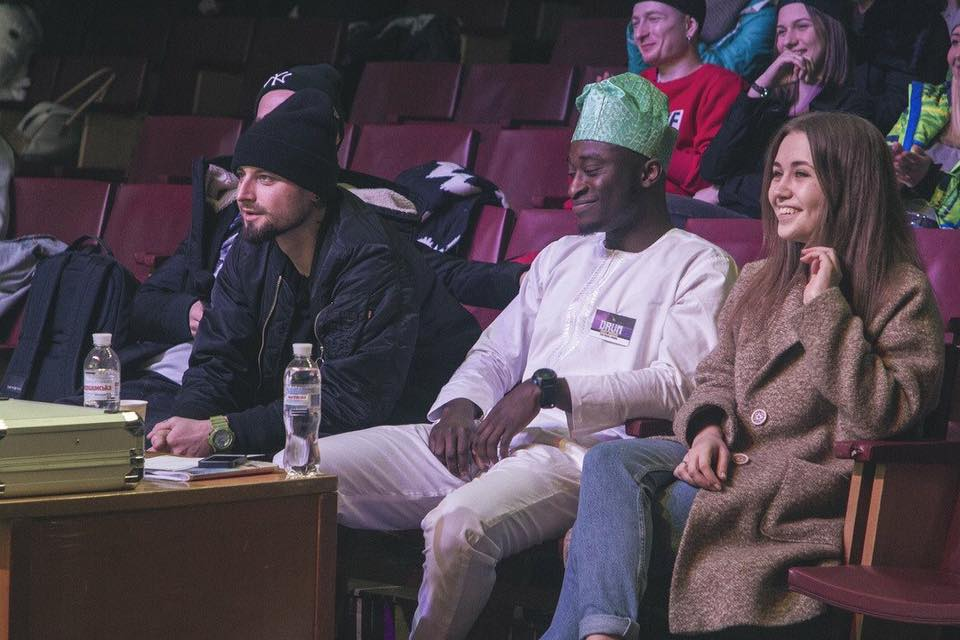
The Judges at the FIRST edition of DrumQuest

Fifteen drummers from all over Ukraine participated in the auditions. Oleg Noga, a twenty-year-old drummer, won the first edition of DrumQuest. In 2017, Noga moved to Poland to play with bands there.

=== Second edition ===
The second edition of DrumQuest took place between 2 and 3 December 2016 at Dom Pechat in Kharkiv. At the grand finale, Daniel Varfomeleyev, a twelve-year-old drummer from Dnipropetrovsk, beat fifteen other drummers to win the contest.

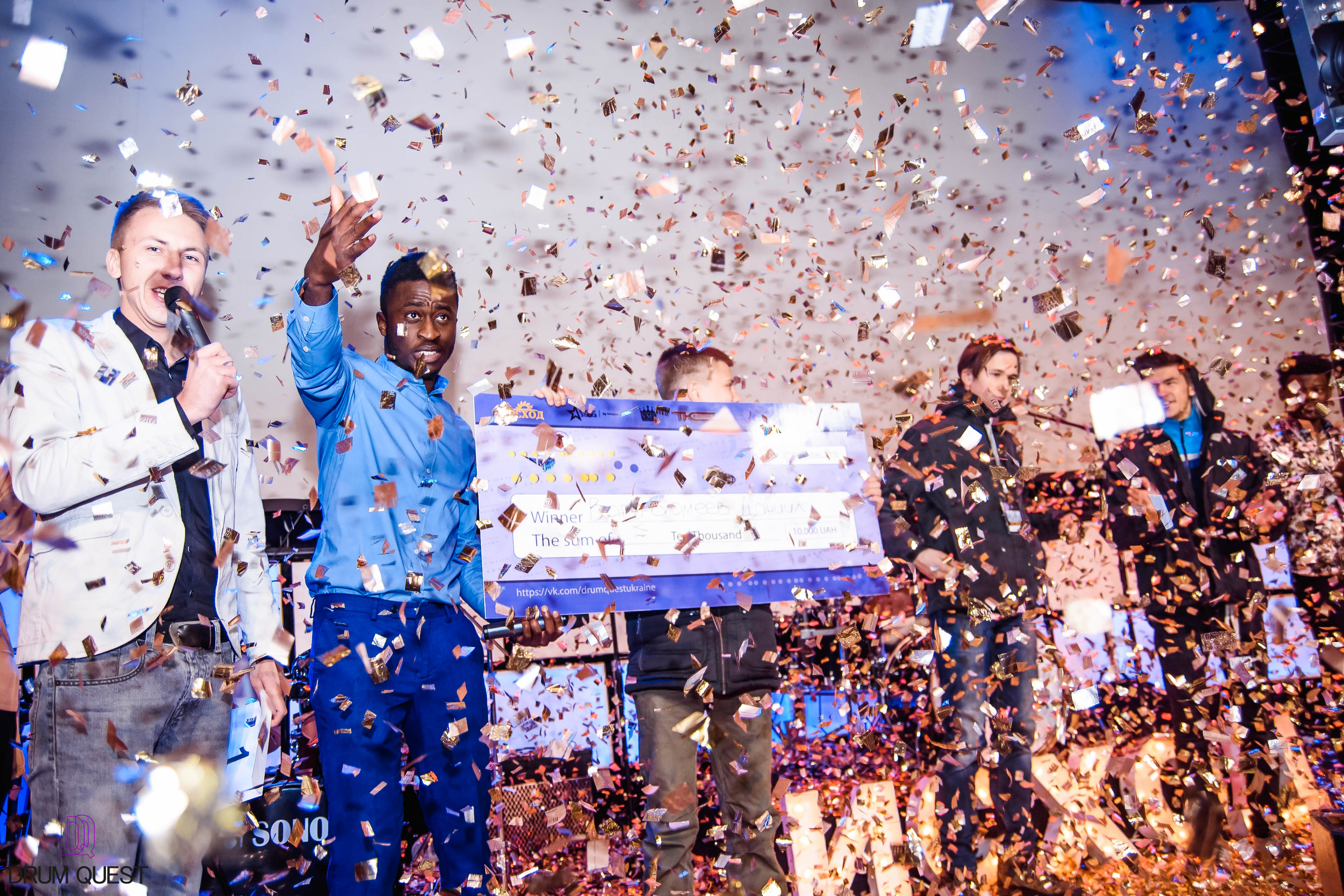
The Moment Daniel Varfomeleyev was announced as the winner of the SECOND edition of DrumQuest

For the second edition, Alexander Lyulyakin, the drummer for Boombox and the Erised, returned as a judge. He was joined by Paul Kholdyansky, the drummer for Prime Orchestra and Vadym Samosyuk of Los Samos. Anyanya Udongwo, musician and internet sensation famous for his rendition of "Hallelujah" at The Voice of Ukraine reality show 2014 (where he finished as a semi finalist), also performed as a guest artiste. The second edition was better than the first as more entertainment journalists covered the event.

=== Upcoming edition ===
Plans are being made to hold another edition of DrumQuest by October 2017. More judges are expected to join the panel and more drummers have been invited.
