= Louder than Words (Pink Floyd song) =

Pink Floyd song

Single by Pink Floyd

from the album The Endless River
- Released: 14 October 2014
- Recorded: 1993/2014 on the Astoria (London, England)
- Genre: Progressive rock
- Length: 6:37 (album); 4:40 (Promo edit)
- Label: Columbia
- Songwriters: David Gilmour; Polly Samson
- Producers: David Gilmour; Martin Glover; Andy Jackson; Phil Manzanera

Pink Floyd singles chronology
"Proper Education" (2007)	"Louder than Words" (2014)	"Hey, Hey, Rise Up!" (2022)

Music video
- "Louder than Words" on YouTube

"Louder than Words" is a song by English rock band Pink Floyd, written by David Gilmour and Polly Samson. The song, featuring lyrics written by Samson to accompany a composition by Gilmour, was recorded by the band as the closing track of their fifteenth studio and final album, The Endless River. The track features a posthumous appearance by former keyboardist and founder member of Pink Floyd, Richard Wright, and an appearance by electronic string quartet Escala. "Louder than Words" is the only song on the album with lyrics, which were sung by Gilmour.

The track was released to US mainstream rock radio on 14 October 2014, serving as the first and only release in promotion of The Endless River.

== Composition ==
The music accompanying the song, composed by David Gilmour, has been described by various music critics and writers, including Exclaim! writer Josiah Hughes as "a slow-burning, melodramatic track complete with plenty of intense guitar and synth work" and by Clash writer Robin Murray as a "sparse, trippy track, one which is heavy on guitar led atmosphere and ominous electronic production". The lyrics, written by Gilmour's wife, Polly Samson, provide "stately depiction of undying love, a tribute to Richard Wright and the importance of overcoming petty differences". Gilmour spoke about the song with The Guardian, stating:

Well, Rick is gone. This is the last thing that'll be out from us. I'm pretty certain there will not be any follow up to this. And Polly, my wife, thought that would be a very good lyrical idea to go out on. A way of describing the symbiosis that we have. Or had… I didn't necessarily always give [Wright] his proper due. People have very different attitudes to the way they work and we can become very judgmental and think someone is not quite pulling his weight enough, without realising that theirs is a different weight to pull.

Gilmour and Mason eventually reversed that decision in 2022, releasing the single "Hey, Hey, Rise Up!", in aid of humanitarian relief during the Russian invasion of Ukraine.

== Lyrics ==
David Gilmour's wife Polly Samson wrote the lyrics for "Louder than Words." She based the lyrics on observations of the band's behaviour during the rehearsals, downtime and performance at Live 8 in July 2005, the band's first reunion as Pink Floyd with Roger Waters in over 24 years.

I remembered that at Live 8 (the 2005 benefit concerts which saw former Floyd bassist Roger Waters return to play with the band) that something had struck me then, I’d made some notes. At Live 8, they’d rehearsed, there were sound checks, lots of downtime sitting in rooms with David, Rick, Nick, and, on that occasion, Roger. And what struck me was, they never spoke. They don’t do small talk, they don’t do big talk. It’s not hostile, they just don’t speak. And then they step onto a stage and musically that communication is extraordinary. So, I’d kind of made some notes at that time. I went off into my room absolutely without a piece of music, and wrote that lyric, and then said, “David, if this would do, and if you have a piece of music, you’re welcome to try it.” And he loved it.

== Music video ==
The majority of the music video for "Louder than Words" was shot in Kazakhstan on what was once the Aral Sea. Director Po Powell said to Rolling Stone that the arid landscape that once held one of the world's four largest inland lakes was now "A surreal image if ever I saw one ... a shocking example of human mismanagement and one of the planet's worst environmental disasters. ... The river has shrunk to 10 percent of its original size, destroying the fishing industry and whole townships." As the disaster is somewhat well-known, Powell tried to focus on what it means to a younger generation that was now growing up without the fishing and maritime influences of their forefathers. In contrast, the opening of the music video features a man paddling through clouds (evoking the album cover) and footage of Gilmour, Wright, and Pink Floyd drummer Nick Mason during the Division Bell sessions, with contemporary footage of Gilmour singing at his Medina studio.

== Reception ==
"Louder than Words" received generally positive reviews from music critics. Tom Breihan of Spin Media music webzine Stereogum wrote positively of the song, stating that "the song is a lovely piece of work, a slow prog-rock elegy with a gospel choir and some classic Floyd guitar". Brad Bershad of Zumic also gave the song a positive review. "Gilmour's guitar parts are stellar, although perhaps softer than the classic jagged tone of the '70s records.", he said. "Time has softened The Floyd a bit, but this is still a beautiful song. The autobiographical lyrics, referring to the power behind Pink Floyd's music and infighting are excellent." The song reached number 1 on Polish Radio 3 Chart on 24 October.

== Personnel ==
Adapted from The Endless River liner notes.

Pink Floyd

- David Gilmour – guitars, vocals, Hammond organ, effects, production
- Nick Mason – drums, percussion
- Richard Wright – Rhodes piano, piano, synthesiser

Escala

- Chantal Leverton – viola
- Victoria Lyon – violin
- Helen Nash – cello
- Honor Watson – violin

Additional musicians

- Bob Ezrin – bass guitar, producer (original 1993 sessions)
- Durga McBroom – backing vocals
- Louise Marshal – backing vocals
- Sarah Brown – backing vocals

Production

- Phil Manzanera – producer
- Martin Glover – producer
- Andy Jackson – engineer, producer
- Damon Iddins – engineer

== Charts ==
Chart (2014)	Peak position
Belgium (Ultratip Bubbling Under Flanders)	89
Belgium (Ultratip Bubbling Under Wallonia)	38
US Adult Alternative Airplay (Billboard)	29

== Release history ==
Region	Date	Radio format	Label
United States	14 October 2014	Mainstream rock radio	Columbia Records
