= Oi u luzi chervona kalyna =

Ukrainian 1875 patriotic march song

"Oi, u luzi chervona kalyna"
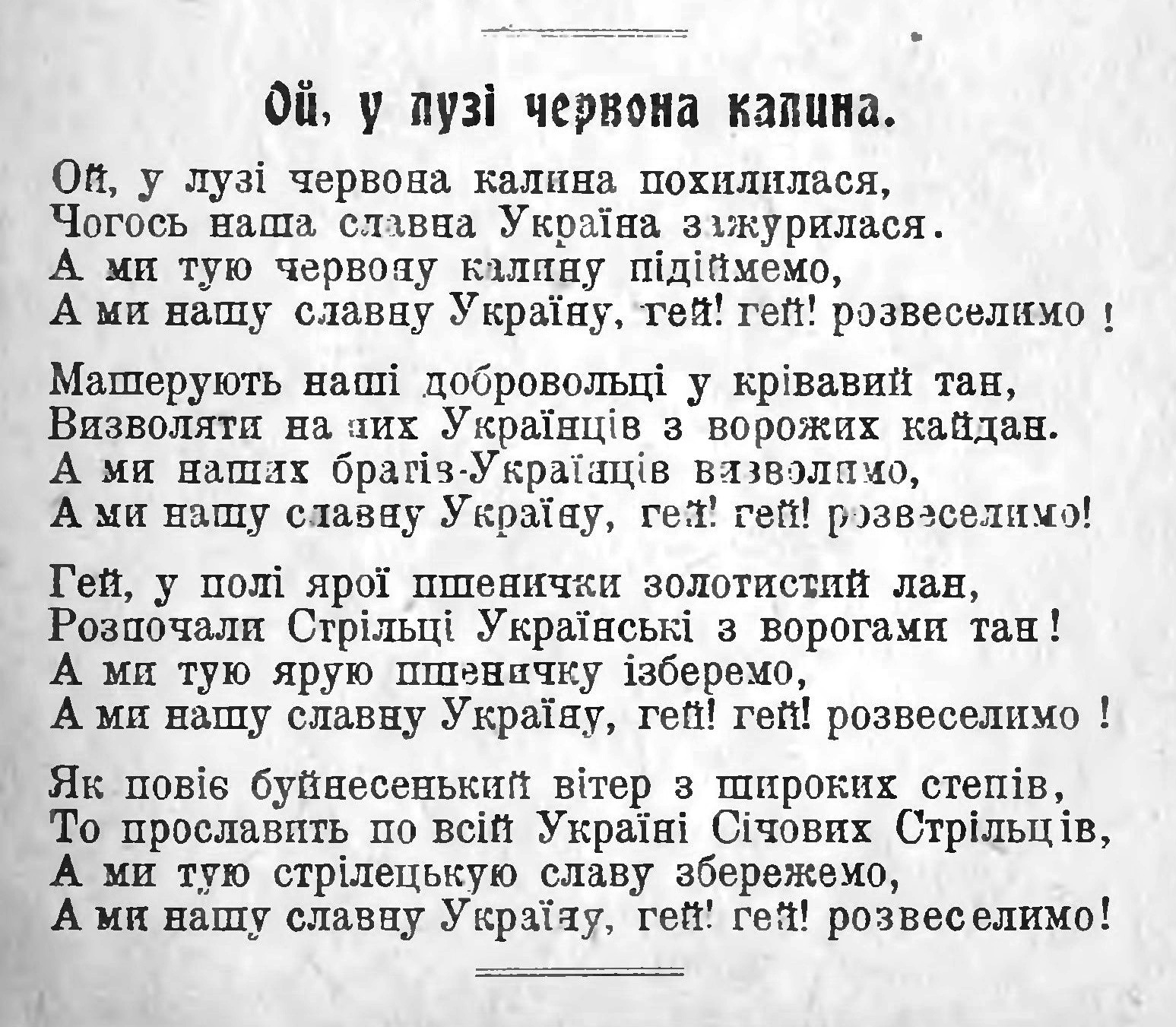
- Image of a 1922 print of the song

Song
- Language: Ukrainian
- English title: Oh, the Red Viburnum in the Meadow
- Released: 1914
- Genre: patriotic
- Songwriter: Stepan Charnetsky

Music video
- Performance by the band of the Air Force of the Armed Forces of Ukraine and three choirs in Vinnytsia

"Oi u luzi chervona kalyna" (Ukrainian: «Ой, у лузі червона калина») is a Ukrainian patriotic march. It is translated into English as "Oh, the Red Viburnum in the Meadow". First published in 1875 by the Ukrainian historians Volodymyr Antonovych and Mykhailo Drahomanov, it was arranged by the composer Stepan Charnetsky in 1914, and was used by the Ukrainian Sich Riflemen, the first ethnic Ukrainian military formation of the 20th century, during the First World War. The song has many variations.

The red viburnum (Viburnum opulus) is a national symbol of Ukraine. It is a deciduous shrub that grows 4 to 5 metres (13 to 16 ft) tall. It is depicted as a silhouette along the edges of the flag of the president of Ukraine.

Following the occupation of Crimea in 2014, and then in 2022 the Russian invasion of Ukraine, singing "nationalist anthems" such as "Chervona Kalyna" in Russian-occupied Crimea became punishable by fines and imprisonment.

== History ==
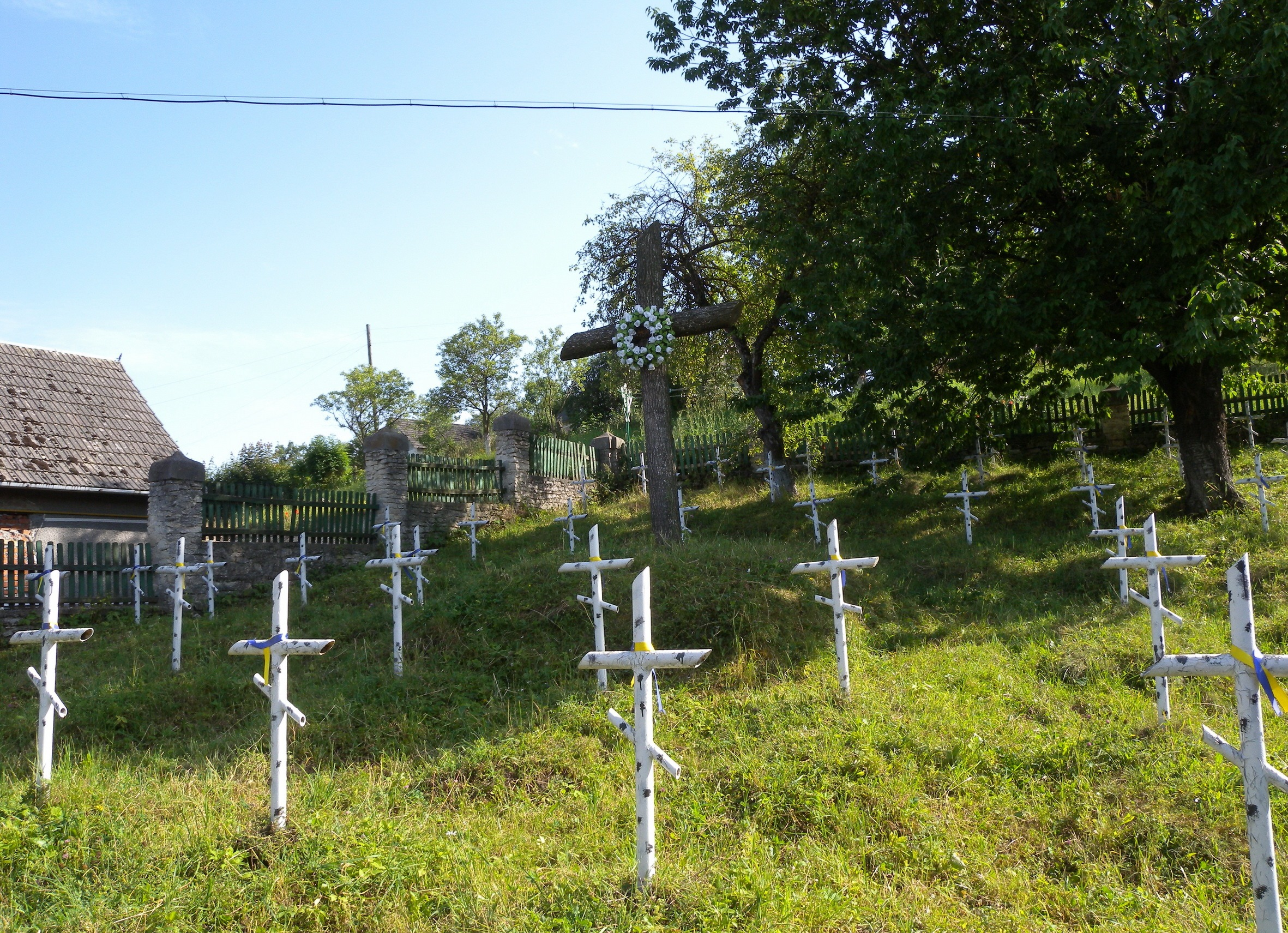
A graveyard of Sich Riflemen soldiers near Ternopil. The song was written in their honor.

The text of the song derives from the folk composition The Steep Banks Overflowed (Розлилися круті бережечки) dating from the mid-17th century Khmelnytskyi Uprising. The most popular variant of the song was recorded by Volodymyr Antonovych and Mykhailo Drahomanov during their ethnographic studies in 1875 in the village of Marianivka, then part of Yelysavethrad county, Kherson Governorate.

The song was popularized after being included into Stepan Charnetskyi's performance Sun of the Ruin (Ukrainian: Сонце Руїни), which was based on a play by Vasyl Pachovsky and premiered in early 1914. The song's melody was arranged by conductor Mykhailo Kossak. The play achieved great success, being performed in Lviv's Ruska Besida theatre and around Eastern Galicia. In September 1914, after the beginning of the First World War, the song from the performance was heard by Hryhoriy Trukh, an officer of the Ukrainian Sich Riflemen, in Stryi. Trukh created three new strophas for the song, and it became the unit's anthem. According to Ivan Bobersky, the song's optimistic verse, proclaiming Sich Riflemen's aim to liberate Ukraine from "Moskals", outweighed the content of other military songs of the time, which were generally sad.

During the Interwar era the song was arranged for choir by Alexander Koshetz and Filaret Kolessa and became popular around Galicia, stopping to be associated exclusively with the military. In 1925 Chervona Kalyna was recorded in the United States by Metropolitan Opera singer of Ukrainian origin Mykhailo Zozuliak, also known for making a recording of the National Anthem of Ukraine nine years earlier. In 1944 the song was issued as a recording for the second time with arrangement of Alexander Koshetz. The song was also present in the repertoire of the Russian opera singer Feodor Chaliapin.

During and after the Second World War, Chervona Kalyna was also used by the Ukrainian Insurgent Army. Due to the song's association with the Ukrainian people's aspiration for independence, singing it was banned during the period in which Ukraine was a Soviet Republic from 1919 to 1991. During that period it was spread mostly in family circles and among dissidents. Nevertheless, in 1961 a version of the song's text was published in a collection of historical songs issued in Kyiv. Open performances of the song became widespread in Ukraine during the late 1980s, when it was frequently used at protest meetings. Around that time a modified version of the text was created by Ukrainian dissident Nadiya Svitlychna.

=== Russian invasion of Ukraine ===
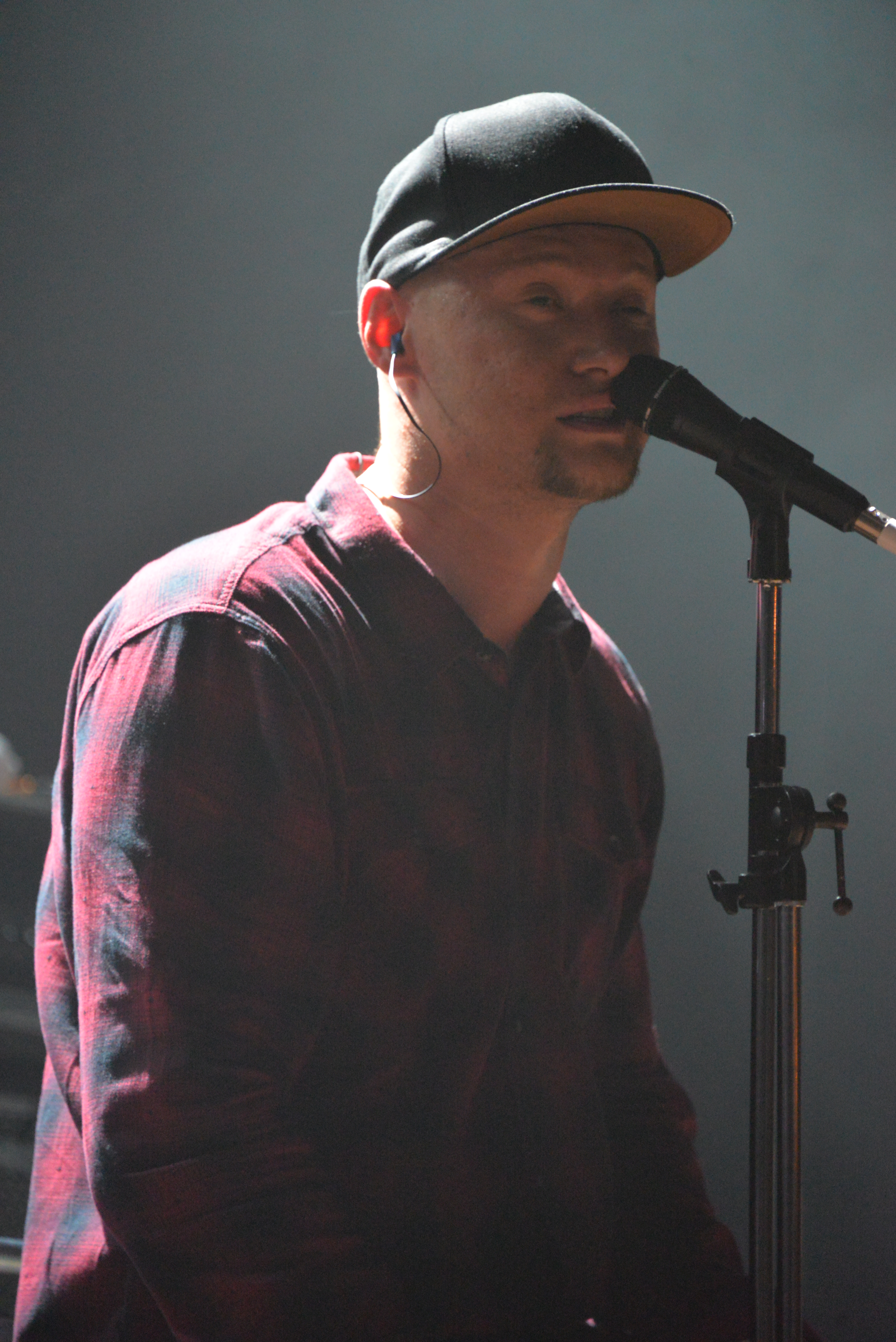
Andriy Khlyvnyuk, of the Ukrainian band BoomBox.

In March 2022, the song gained international attention when an Instagram video of an a cappella rendition by Andriy Khlyvnyuk, of the Ukrainian band BoomBox, singing the first verse of the song was remixed by different artists around the world. The melody was somewhat changed. According to Valentyna Kuzyk, in this variant, "the energy of the primordial breath breaks out of stable forms and enters a new life space".

BoomBox was touring in the United States when the Russian invasion of Ukraine started on 24 February. In response to the invasion, Khlyvnyuk cut the tour short to return to Ukraine to join the armed forces. He recorded the video while wearing army fatigues, standing near Sophia Square in Kyiv, and uploaded it to his Instagram account on 27 February, where it became viral.

The first artist to remix Khlyvnyuk's rendition was South African musician The Kiffness in early March. At the end of the same month, Ukrainian ice dancers Oleksandra Nazarova and Maksym Nikitin performed to the song at the 2022 World Figure Skating Championships in protest of the invasion.

In April 2022, Pink Floyd made use of Khlyvnyuk's recording for the vocal track of "Hey, Hey, Rise Up!", a single and video that the band released in aid of Ukrainian humanitarian relief. In the video, Khlyvnyuk's performance is projected behind the band while they are performing and is sometimes shown full screen. The song opens with a sample from another recording of "Oi u luzi chervona kalyna", by the Veryovka Ukrainian Folk Choir.

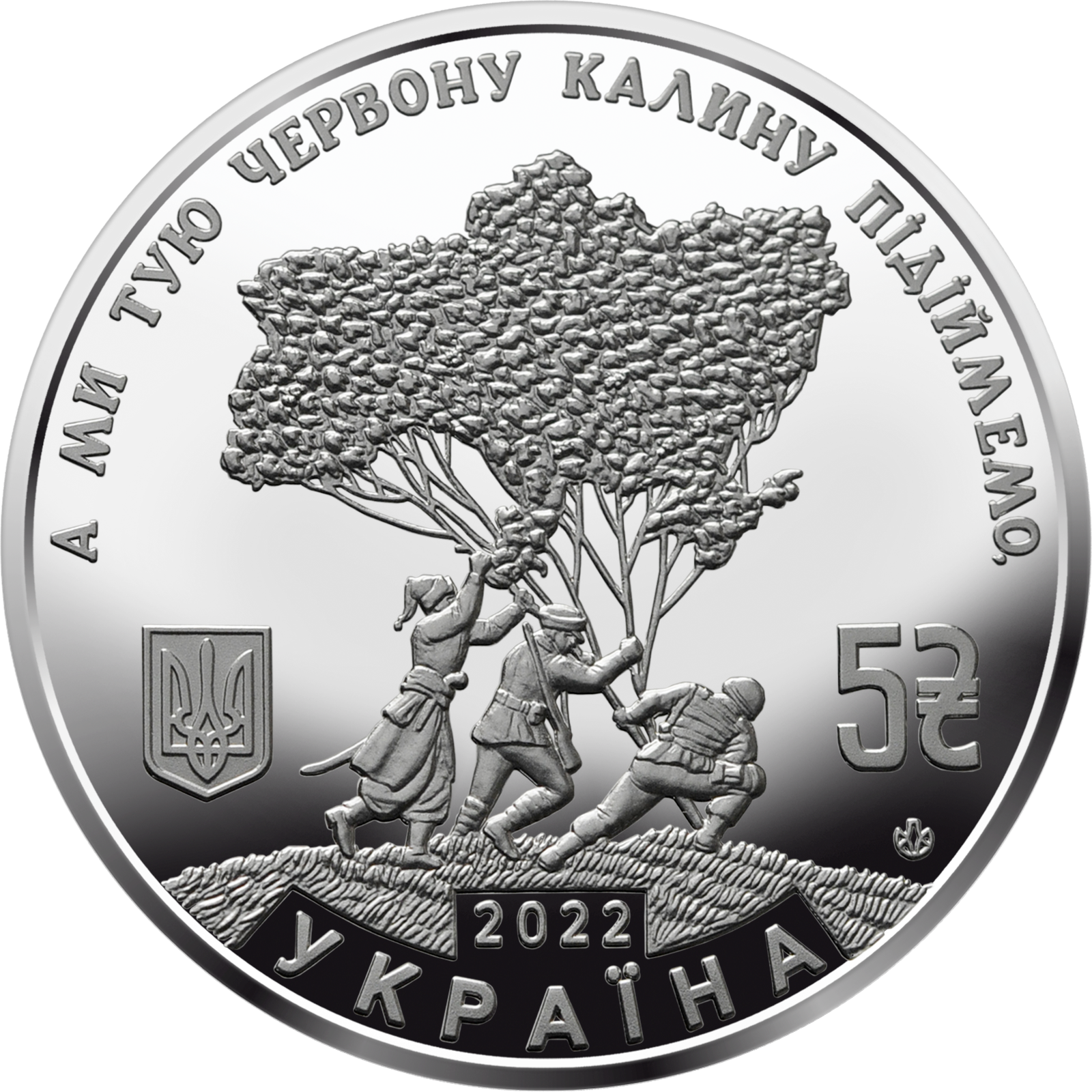
A commemorative coin released by the Government of Ukraine in 2022 with the inscription taken from the third line of the song

Since then, new versions have appeared on YouTube, including remixes of the original remix.

On 28 June 2022 over 1,000 singers from more than 50 countries performed the song in what became the world's largest online performance according to the Guinness World Book of Records.

=== Banned in Crimea ===
Following the 2014 annexation of Crimea, and then the 2022 Russian invasion of Ukraine, singing "nationalist anthems" such as "Chervona Kalyna" in Crimea was deemed to discredit the Russian army, and was punished by fines and imprisonment. In September 2022, the Russian occupation authorities in Crimea jailed and fined members of a wedding party for "discrediting" the Russian Armed Forces by playing the song. The singers of the song in an online video were imprisoned and fined.

Sergey Aksyonov, the Russian leader of the Crimean peninsula, warned that authorities would punish people harshly for singing such songs. He said that "People who do this are acting like traitors", and that there was a special FSB security service group working on the matter.

== Symbolism ==
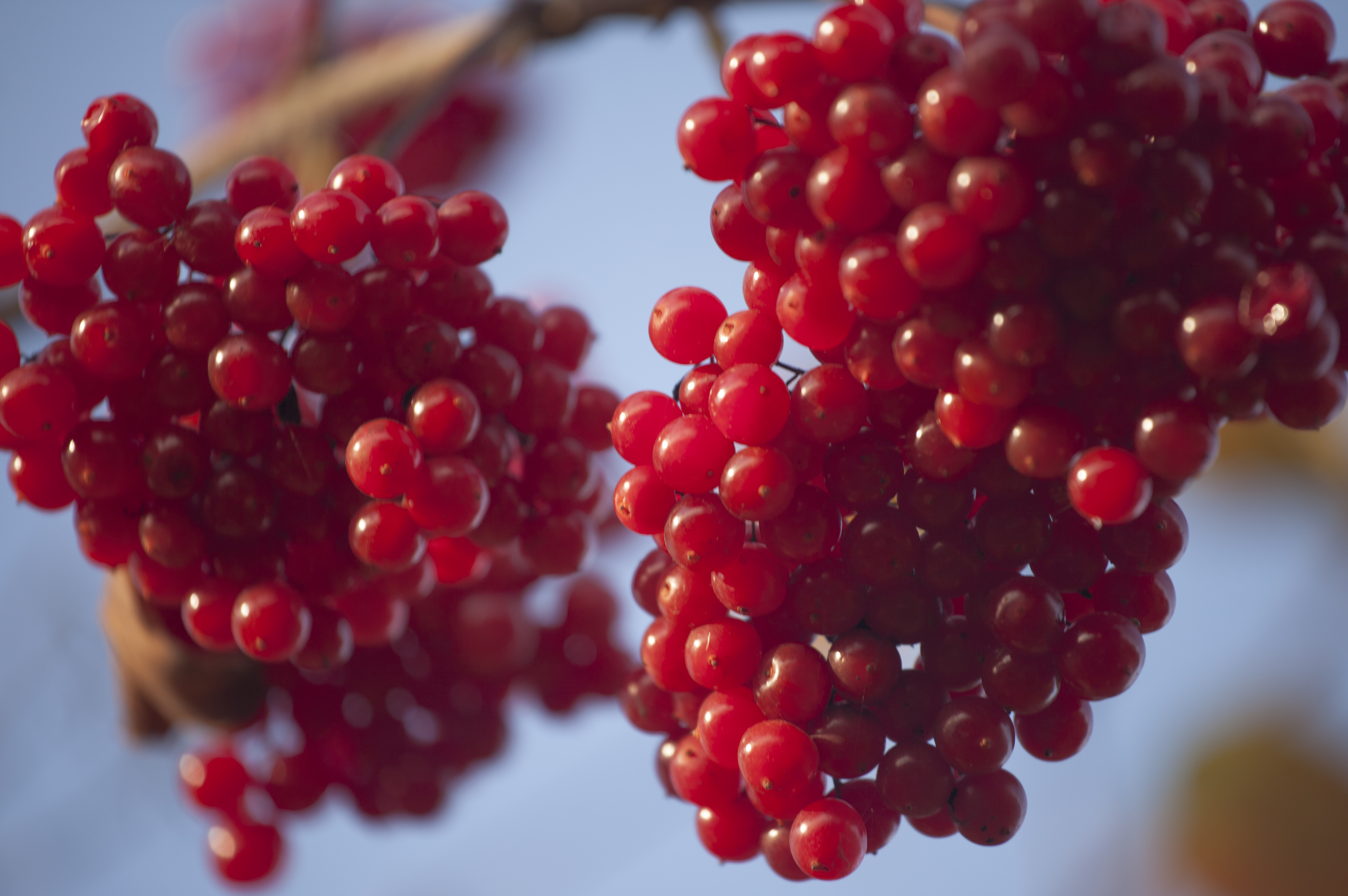
Red Viburnum berries (kalyna), the subject of the song

Red Viburnum berries (kalyna) are a symbol that has been a part of the Ukrainian culture since ancient times. Symbolizing Cossack blood spilled in battle, in many Ukrainian ballads they serve as a metaphor for untimely death and are believed to grow on places where young men were buried.

== Charts ==
=== Weekly charts ===
Weekly chart performance for "Oi u luzi chervona kalyna (Army remix)" by The Kiffness
Chart (2022)	Peak position
Ukraine Airplay (TopHit) Army Remix	1

=== Monthly charts ===
Monthly chart performance for "Oi u luzi chervona kalyna (Army remix)" by The Kiffness
Chart (2022)	Peak position
Ukraine Airplay (TopHit)	1

=== Year-end charts ===
Year-end chart performance for "Oi u luzi chervona kalyna (Army remix)" by The Kiffness
Chart (2022)	Position
Ukraine Airplay (TopHit)	2

== Lyrics ==
Ukrainian original	Ukrainian Latin alphabet	English translation
Ой у лузі червона калина похилилася, Чогось наша славна Україна зажурилася. А ми тую червону калину підіймемо, А ми нашу славну Україну, гей-гей, розвеселимо! А ми тую червону калину підіймемо, А ми нашу славну Україну, гей-гей, розвеселимо!	Oj u luzi červona kalyna pochylylasia, Čohoś naša slavna Ukraina zažurylasia. A my tuju červonu kalynu pidijmemo, A my našu slavnu Ukrainu, hej-hej, rozveselymo! A my tuju červonu kalynu pidijmemo, A my našu slavnu Ukrainu, hej-hej, rozveselymo!	Oh, in the meadow a red kalyna has bent down low, For some reason, our glorious Ukraine is in sorrow. And we will take that red kalyna and we will raise it up, And, hey-hey, we shall cheer up our glorious Ukraine! And we will take that red kalyna and we will raise it up, And, hey-hey, we shall cheer up our glorious Ukraine!
Не хилися, червона калино, маєш білий цвіт, Не журися, славна Україно, маєш вільний рід. А ми тую червону калину підіймемо, А ми нашу славну Україну, гей-гей, розвеселимо! А ми тую червону калину підіймемо, А ми нашу славну Україну, гей-гей, розвеселимо!	Ne chylysia, červona kalyno, maješ bilyj cvit, Ne žurysia, slavna Ukraino, maješ viľnyj rid. A my tuju červonu kalynu pidijmemo, A my našu slavnu Ukrainu, hej-hej, rozveselymo! A my tuju červonu kalynu pidijmemo, A my našu slavnu Ukrainu, hej-hej, rozveselymo!	Do not bend low, oh red kalyna, you have a white flower, Do not worry, glorious Ukraine, you have a free people. And we will take that red kalyna and will raise it up, And, hey-hey, we shall cheer up our glorious Ukraine! And we will take that red kalyna and will raise it up, And, hey-hey, we shall cheer up our glorious Ukraine!
Марширують наші добровольці у кривавий тан, Визволяти братів-українців з московських кайдан. А ми наших братів-українців визволимо, А ми нашу славну Україну, гей-гей, розвеселимо! А ми наших братів-українців визволимо, А ми нашу славну Україну, гей-гей, розвеселимо!	Maršyrujuť naši dobrovoľci u kryvavyj tan, Vyzvoliaty brativ-ukrainciv z Moskovśkych kajdan. A my našych brativ-ukrainciv vyzvolymo, A my našu slavnu Ukrainu, hej-hej, rozveselymo! A my našych brativ-ukrainciv vyzvolymo, A my našu slavnu Ukrainu, hej-hej, rozveselymo!	Marching forward, our fellow volunteers, into a bloody fray, For to free our brotherly Ukrainians from the Moscovian shackles. And we, our brother Ukrainians, we will then liberate, And, hey-hey, we shall cheer up our glorious Ukraine! And we, our brotherly Ukrainians, will then liberate, And, hey-hey, we shall cheer up our glorious Ukraine!
Ой у полі ярої пшенички золотистий лан, Розпочали стрільці українські з ворогами тан. А ми тую ярую пшеничку ізберемо, А ми нашу славну Україну, гей-гей, розвеселимо! А ми тую ярую пшеничку ізберемо, А ми нашу славну Україну, гей-гей, розвеселимо!	Oj u poli jaroi pšenyčky zolotystyj lan, Rozpočaly striľci ukrainśki z vorohamy tan. A my tuju jaruju pšenyčku izberemo, A my našu slavnu Ukrainu, hej-hej, rozveselymo! A my tuju jaruju pšenyčku izberemo, A my našu slavnu Ukrainu, hej-hej, rozveselymo!	Oh in the field of early spring wheat, there is a golden furrow, Then began the Ukrainian riflemen to engage the enemy. And we will take that precious, early wheat and will gather it, And, hey-hey, we shall cheer up our glorious Ukraine! And we will take that precious, early wheat and will gather it, And, hey-hey, we shall cheer up our glorious Ukraine!
Як повіє буйнесенький вітер з широких степів, То прославить по всій Україні січових стрільців. А ми тую стрілецькую славу збережемо, А ми нашу славну Україну, гей-гей, розвеселимо! А ми тую стрілецькую славу збережемо, А ми нашу славну Україну, гей-гей, розвеселимо!	Jak povije bujneseńkyj viter z šyrokych stepiv, To proslavyť po vsij Ukraini sičovych striľciv. A my tuju strilećkuju slavu zberežemo, A my našu slavnu Ukrainu, hej-hej, rozveselymo! A my tuju strilećkuju slavu zberežemo, A my našu slavnu Ukrainu, hej-hej, rozveselymo!	When the stormy winds blow forth from the wide steppes, They will glorify, throughout Ukraine, the Sich Riflemen. And so we will preserve the glories of these riflemen, And, hey-hey, we shall cheer up our glorious Ukraine! And so we will preserve the glories of these riflemen, And, hey-hey, we shall cheer up our glorious Ukraine!
