= Hey, Hey, Rise Up! =

2022 single by Pink Floyd

Single by Pink Floyd featuring Andriy Khlyvnyuk of BoomBox
- B-side: "A Great Day for Freedom 2022"
- Released: 8 April 2022
- Recorded: Late February & 30 March 2022
- Genre: Art rock; progressive rock; folk
- Length: 3:27
- Label: Pink Floyd Records; Rhino (Europe); Columbia/Sony Music (worldwide)
- Songwriters: David Gilmour; Andriy Khlyvnyuk; Stepan Charnetskii
- Producer: David Gilmour

Pink Floyd singles chronology
"Louder than Words" (2014)	"Hey, Hey, Rise Up!" (2022)

Music video
- "Hey Hey Rise Up" on YouTube

"Hey, Hey, Rise Up!" (also written "Hey Hey Rise Up") is a song by the English rock band Pink Floyd, released on digital platforms on 8 April 2022. It is based on a 1914 Ukrainian patriotic march, "Oh, the Red Viburnum in the Meadow", and features vocals in Ukrainian by Andriy Khlyvnyuk of the Ukrainian band BoomBox.

"Hey, Hey, Rise Up!" is the first piece of music recorded by Pink Floyd since "Louder than Words" in 2014. The guitarist, David Gilmour, was inspired to record it in support of Ukraine during the 2022 Russian invasion. Pink Floyd also released a music video, directed by Mat Whitecross, with images of life struggling amidst warfare. The single was released on CD and vinyl on 15 July 2022, alongside a new version of Pink Floyd's 1994 song "A Great Day for Freedom". All proceeds go to the Ukraine Humanitarian Relief Fund.

== Background ==
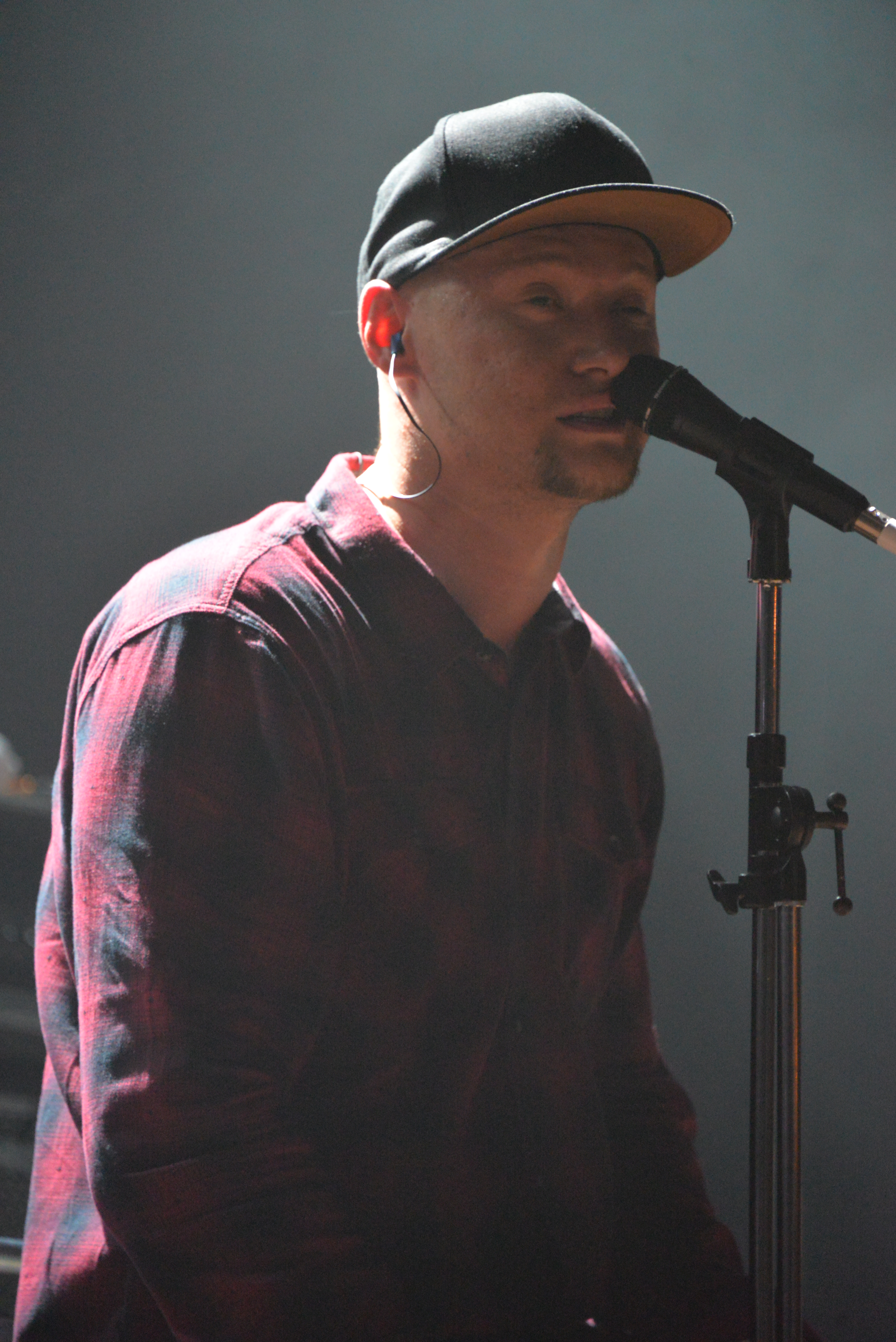
Andriy Khlyvnyuk, seen in 2015

In February 2022, the Ukrainian singer Andriy Khlyvnyuk, who had abandoned a US tour by his band BoomBox to serve in the Ukrainian military in response to the Russian invasion of Ukraine on 24 February, recorded an a capella version of the first verse of the Ukrainian anthem "Oh, the Red Viburnum in the Meadow" (Ukrainian: Ой у лузі червона калина). The anthem was written by Stepan Charnetskii in 1914 to commemorate the Sich Riflemen. Khlyvnyuk, wearing fatigues and carrying an automatic rifle, videoed his performance in Sophia Square in Kyiv, with the Bell Tower of Saint Sophia Cathedral in the background, and posted it on Instagram on 27 February.

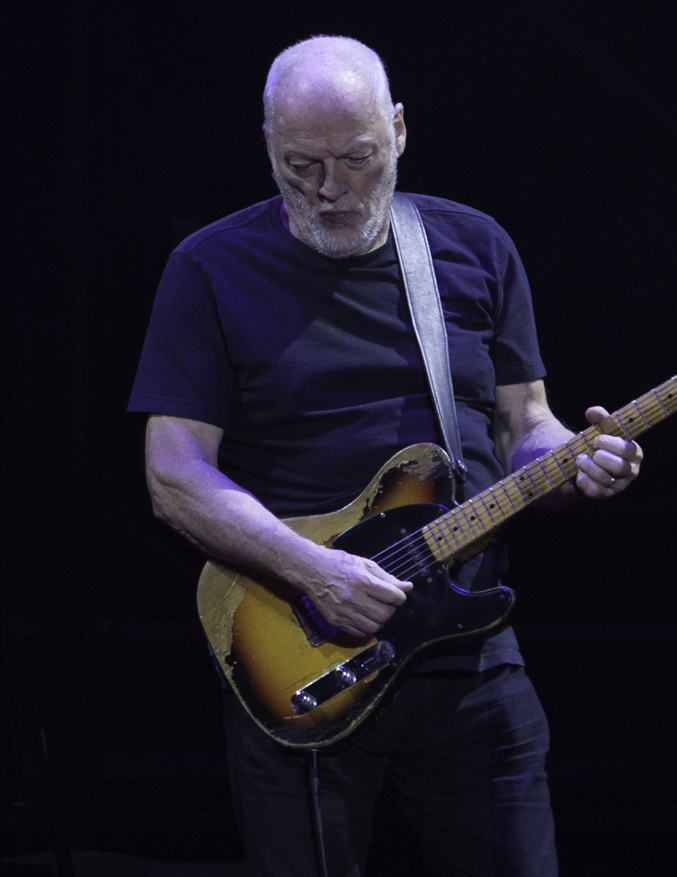
David Gilmour of Pink Floyd, seen in 2015

The Pink Floyd guitarist, David Gilmour, was shown the Instagram post by the Ukrainian artist Janina Pedan, who is married to his son Charlie, and was inspired to record something in support of Ukraine in the ongoing Russo-Ukrainian War. He contacted Pink Floyd drummer Nick Mason and suggested they collaborate. Pink Floyd had been inactive for several years, and Gilmour had said several times that the band would not reunite; however, the war encouraged him to release the track as Pink Floyd as it was a "big platform" and it was "vitally" important to raise awareness about the war. He said: "It's a really difficult and frustrating thing to see this extraordinarily crazy, unjust attack by a major power on an independent, peaceful, democratic nation."

Khlyvnyuk, while recovering in hospital from a shrapnel wound sustained in defence of Ukraine, gave Gilmour his blessing to use his vocals. Gilmour wrote extra music, including a guitar solo. Gilmour had previously been backed by BoomBox—without Khlyvnyuk—in 2015, at Koko, London, in support of the Belarus Free Theatre.

Pink Floyd had already removed music from streaming services in Russia and Belarus. Their work with their former bassist and lyricist, Roger Waters, remained, leading to speculation that Waters had blocked its removal; Gilmour said only that "I was disappointed ... Read into that what you will." Gilmour said the song was a "one-off for charity" and that Pink Floyd had no plans to reform.

== Recording ==
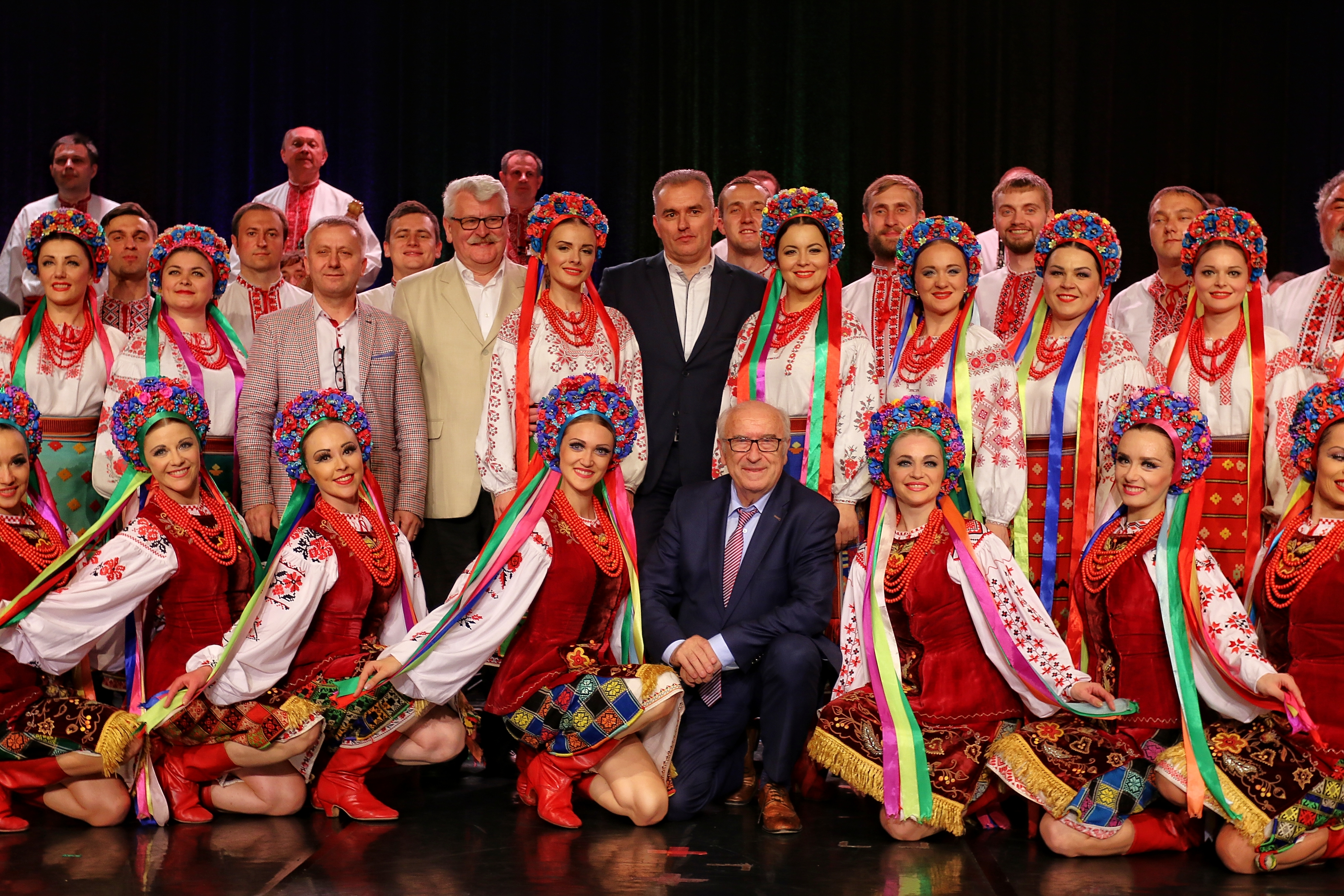
The Veryovka Ukrainian Folk Choir in 2018

"Hey, Hey, Rise Up!" was recorded on 30 March 2022 at Gilmour's home by Gilmour and Mason with Guy Pratt, bassist with Pink Floyd since 1987, and keyboardist Nitin Sawhney. It was Sawhney's first work with Pink Floyd. Gala Wright, the daughter of late Pink Floyd keyboardist and founding member Richard Wright, was also present during the recording.

The song—whose title comes from the last line of "Oh, the Red Viburnum in the Meadow", which some translations give as "Hey, hey, rise up and rejoice"—opens with a sample from another recording of Charnetskii's anthem, by the Veryovka Ukrainian Folk Choir.

== Music video ==
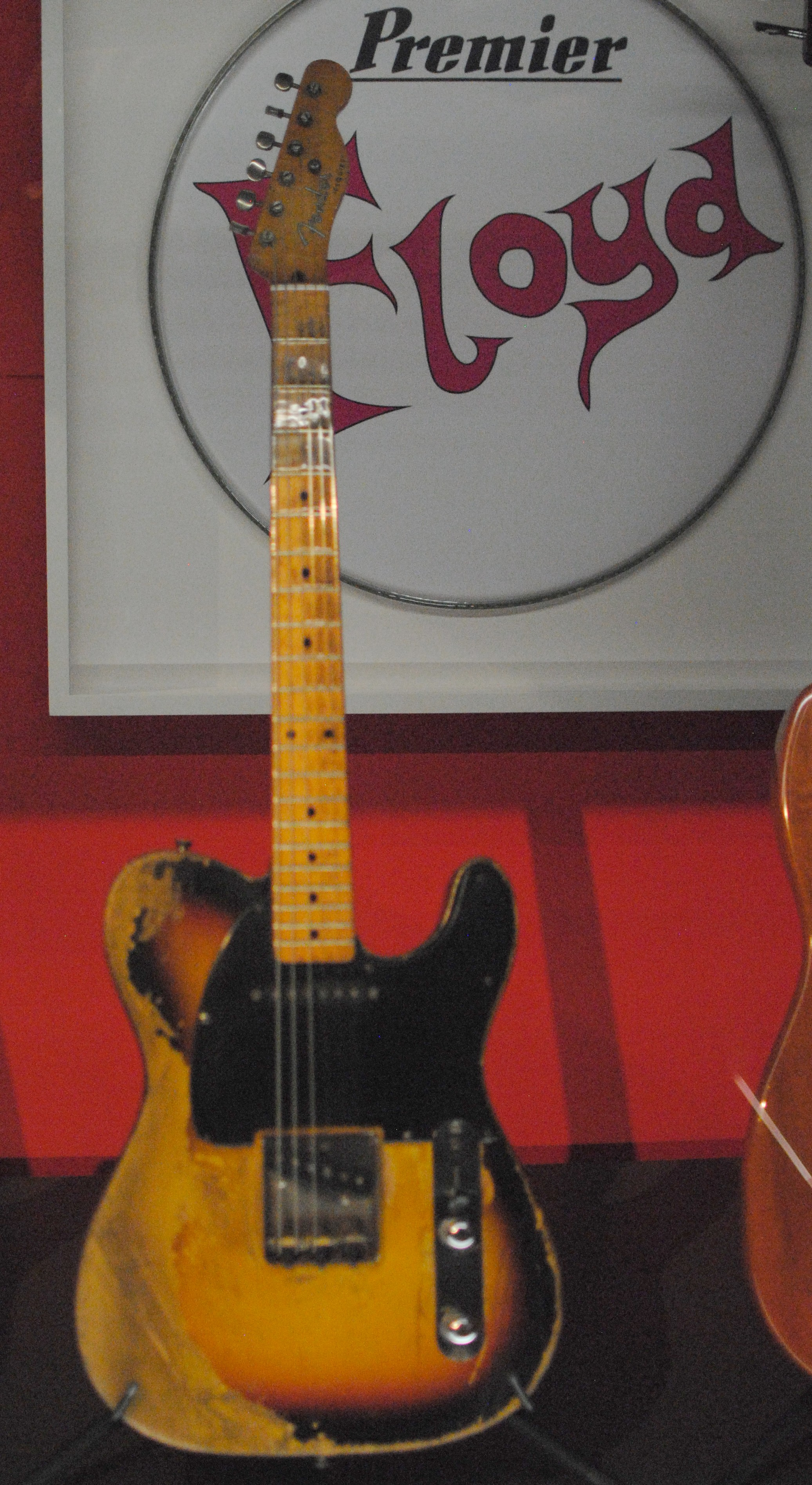
Gilmour's 1952 Fender Esquire, nicknamed "the Workmate", used on the song and in the video

The music video was directed by Mat Whitecross, also on 30 March, on a set designed by Pedan. In the video, the band play while Khlyvnyuk's Sophia Square video is projected behind them. The performance is intercut with scenes of war damage, survivors and refugees in Ukraine. Mason's drums are decorated with reproductions of a painting by Maria Primachenko, a Ukrainian artist, several of whose works were destroyed in a fire caused by Russian shelling during the invasion.

== Cover art ==
The single's artwork depicts a band logotype (in the style of Gerald Scarfe's lettering for Pink Floyd – The Wall) patterned after the Ukrainian flag alongside a sunflower, the national flower of Ukraine, in a 2019 painting by Cuban artist Yosan Leon. The choice of flower also references a remark from a Ukrainian woman who was seen handing sunflower seeds to Russian soldiers in the early days of the invasion, telling them to carry the seeds in their pockets so that sunflowers will grow from their dead bodies.

== Release ==
"Hey, Hey, Rise Up!" was released on digital platforms and streaming services on 8 April 2022. It was Pink Floyd's first newly recorded material since the 2014 song "Louder Than Words". A physical version of the single on both CD and vinyl was released on 15 July 2022, which included a newly reworked version of "A Great Day for Freedom" as a b-side. Proceeds from "Hey, Hey, Rise Up!" go to the Ukraine Humanitarian Relief Fund.

== Reception ==
Based on downloads and sales in its first two days, "Hey, Hey, Rise Up!" appeared on the midweek UK Singles Chart at number 5. It debuted at number 49 on the final chart.

The journalist Mark Savage of BBC News praised the "spine-tingling refrain" by Khlyvnyuk. Khlyvnyuk said the song was "fabulous" and thanked Pink Floyd. Some fans felt it was improper for the group to release music as Pink Floyd without the keyboardist Richard Wright, who died in 2008, or Waters, who left in 1985. The Classic Rock journalist Fraser Lewry disagreed, writing: "When thousands have been killed and millions have fled their homes, moaning about the absence of a band member [Waters] who left 37 years ago is churlish at best. At worst, it's contemptuous of the suffering."

Waters said the song "lacked humanity" and constituted a "content-less waving of the blue and yellow flag" rather than an explicit call for the war to end. He said Russia's invasion of Ukraine was "probably the most provoked invasion ever" and refused to "see Russia from the current Russophobic perspective".

== Personnel ==
- David Gilmour – guitar, additional vocals, producer
- Nick Mason – drums
- Andriy Khlyvnyuk – vocals
- Guy Pratt – bass guitar
- Nitin Sawhney – keyboards
- Romany Gilmour – additional vocals
- Veryovka Folk Song and Dance Ensemble – choral vocal sample

Technical

- Assisted by Damon Iddins

Artwork

- "The Sunflower Look" by Yosan Leon – front cover painting
- Steve Knee / Blade Design Ltd – artwork design

== Charts ==
=== Weekly charts ===
Chart performance for "Hey, Hey, Rise Up!"
Chart (2022)	Peak position
Canada Hot 100 (Billboard)	81
Germany (GfK)	61
Global 200 (Billboard)	165
Hungary (Single Top 40)	3
Japan Hot Overseas (Billboard Japan)	17
New Zealand Hot Singles (RMNZ)	15
Switzerland (Schweizer Hitparade)	2
Ukraine Airplay (TopHit)	33
UK Singles (Official Charts)	49
UK Rock & Metal (Official Charts)	1
US Digital Song Sales (Billboard)	2
US Hot Rock & Alternative Songs (Billboard)	22
US World Digital Song Sales (Billboard)	1

=== Year-end charts ===
2022 year-end chart performance for "Hey, Hey, Rise Up!"
Chart (2022)	Position
Hungary (Single Top 100)	80

== See also ==
- 2022 in music
- Pink Floyd discography
- Music of Ukraine
