= Andriy Khlyvnyuk =

Ukrainian musician (born 1979)

Andriy Khlyvnyuk Андрій Хливнюк
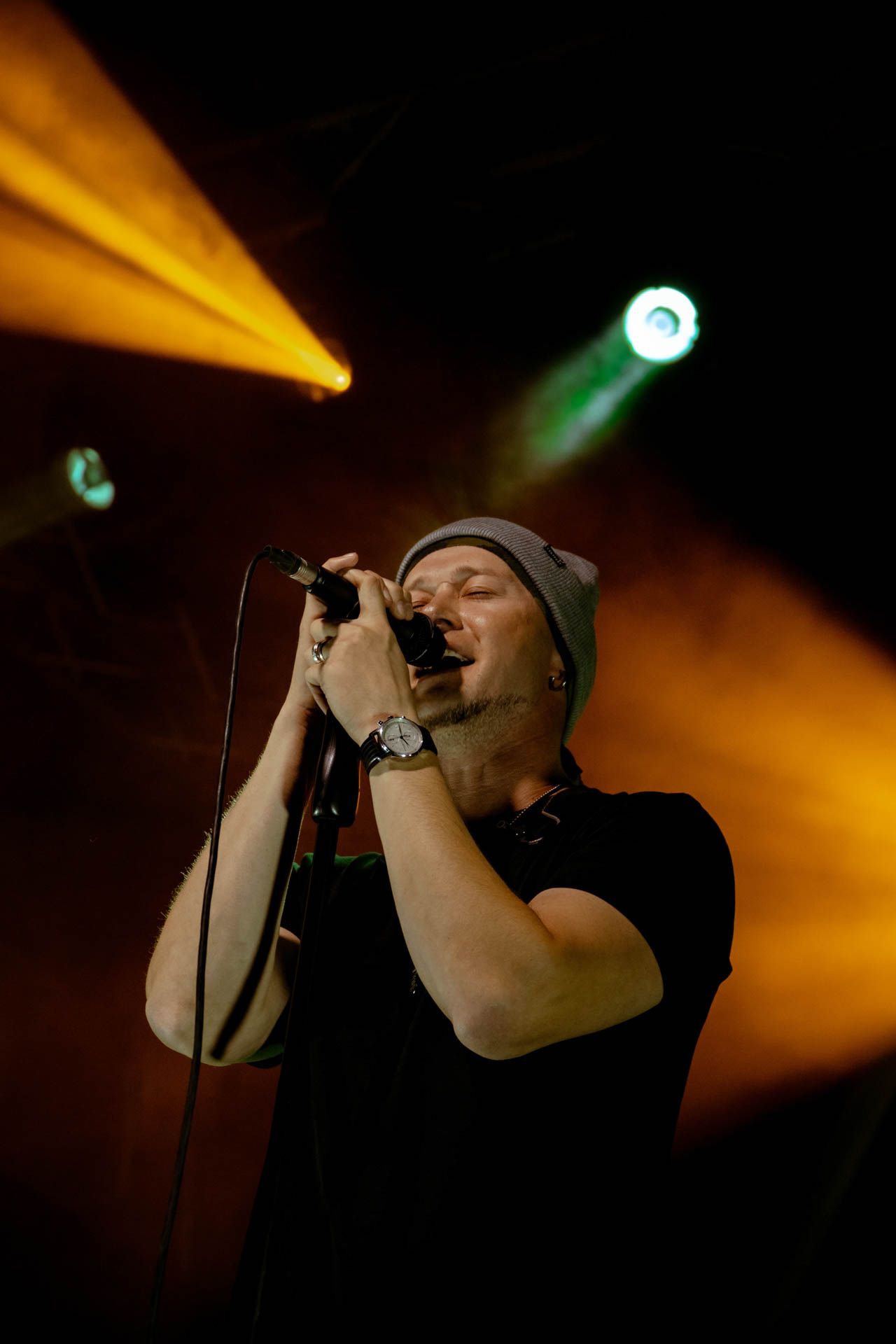
- Khlyvnyuk in 2022

Background information
- Born: December 31, 1979 (age 46); Cherkasy, Ukrainian SSR, Soviet Union
- Origin: Ukraine
- Genres: Funk; hip-hop; pop-rock; jazz
- Occupation: Singer
- Awards: 3rd class Order for Courage

Andriy Volodymyrovych Khlyvnyuk (Note: Also transliterated as Andrii Khlyvniuk) (Ukrainian: Андрій Володимирович Хливнюк; born 31 December 1979) is a Ukrainian musician, the vocalist and lyricist of the group BoomBox.

== Biography ==
Andriy Khlyvnyuk was born on December 31, 1979, in Cherkasy, Ukraine, then in the Ukrainian SSR, Soviet Union. He studied at the music school in the accordion class, the First City Gymnasium. In 2001, the group won the "Pearl of the Season" festival and the band's musicians moved to Kyiv. In the capital, Andriy became interested in jazz and swing, sang with the Acoustic Swing Band. Later, from the members of three groups – Acoustic Swing Band, Dust Mix and Tartak – the group "Graphite" was formed, in which Andriy was a vocalist.

In 2004, Khlyvnyuk, together with the guitarist of the Tartak band, Andriy "Mukha" Samoilo, organized the BoomBox funky groove group. For several years, the group has gained great popularity in Ukraine and Russia. In April 2005, the first album "Melomaniya" was recorded. In 2006, the second disc "Family Business" was released, which received gold status in Ukraine (at the moment, more than 100 thousand copies of the disc have been sold)

Khlyvnyuk was the sound producer of the album of the Ukrainian singer Nadine, with whom he performed his own song "I Don’t Know" in a duet in 2007, and then shot a video. The duet received the award "The most unexpected project of the year" according to the portal E-motion.

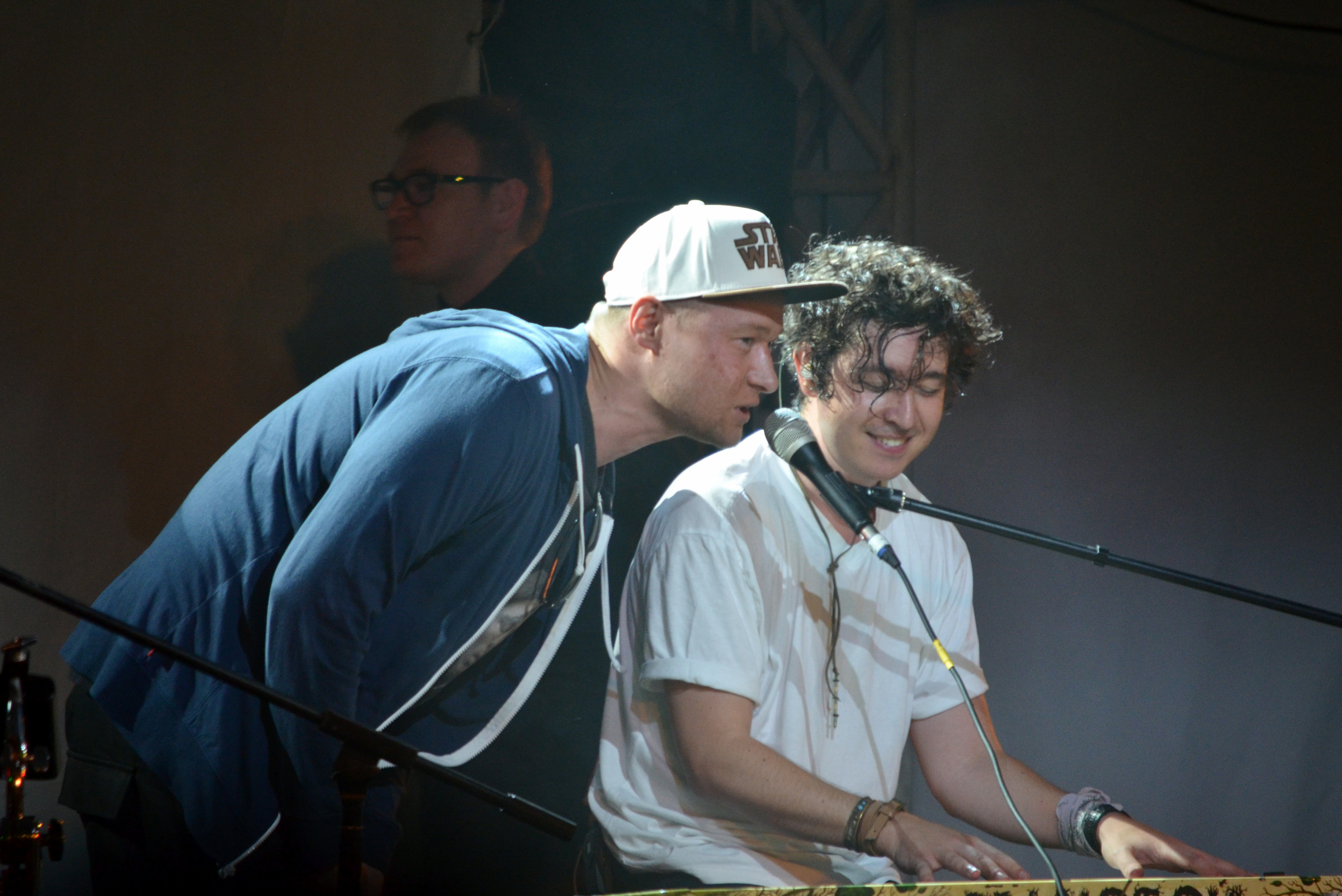
Andriy Khlyvnyuk with Dmytro Shurov at the Pianoboy concert at the Green Theater, Kyiv, 2014

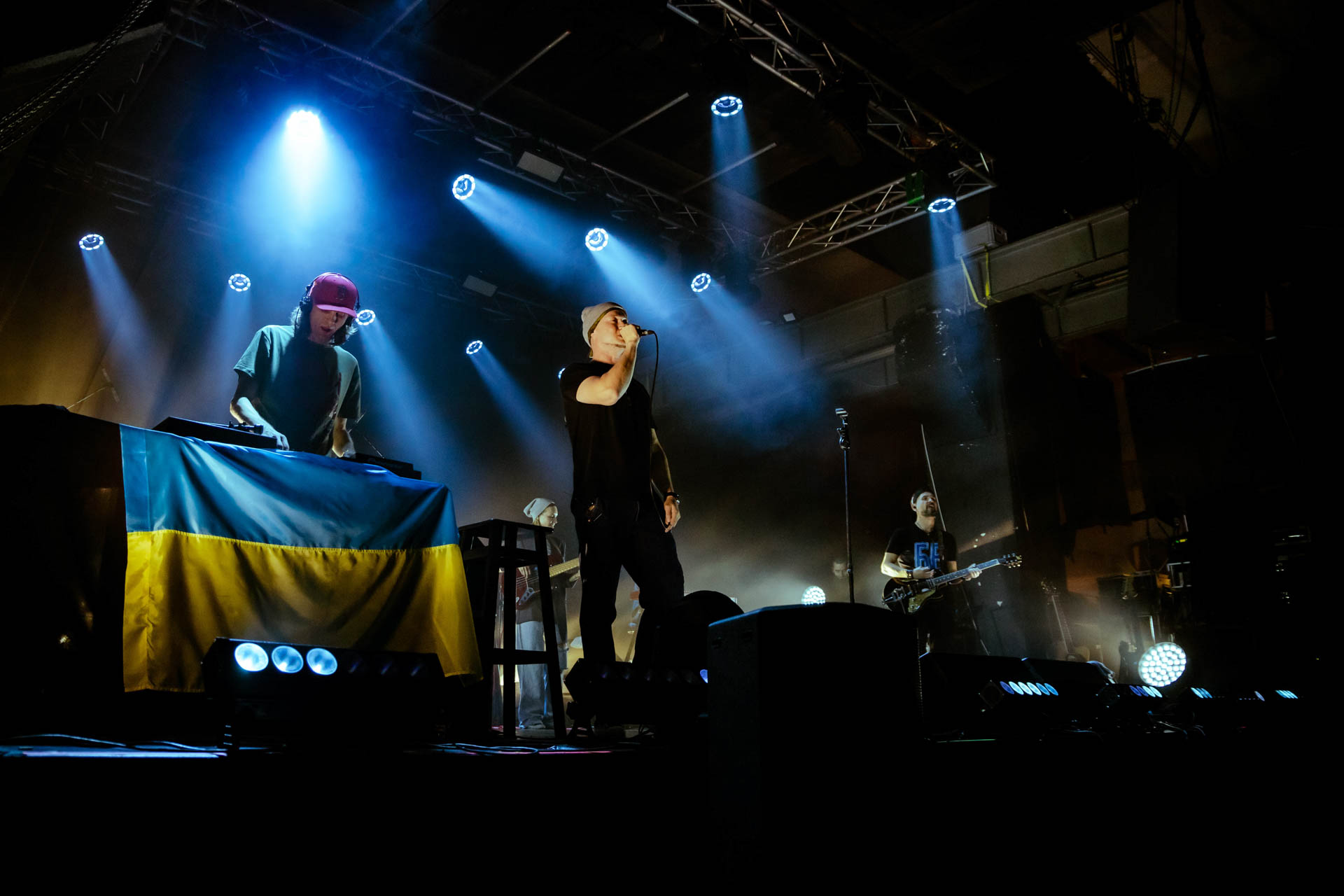
BoomBox in Gdansk, 2022

In the summer of 2007, the composition "Watchmen" hit the radio air of Russian radio stations, and in the fall, the composition "ta4to" got into the rotation of Moscow radio stations. Over time, Russian recording companies became interested in BoomBox, and a contract was signed with Monolith to publish the albums Melomania and Family Business in Russia, which were released on June 10, 2008. In August 2009, Khlyvnyuk, together with Evgeny Koshev and Potap, voiced the French parkour thriller "13th District: Ultimatum". Andriy voiced the French policeman Damien.

In December 2009, the group released a joint album with the Kyiv DJ Tonique. On June 24, 2010, the presentation of the album "All Inclusive" took place in Kyiv. At the end of 2011, the album "Sredniy Vik" was released.

=== 2022 Russian invasion of Ukraine ===
In February 2022, after the Russian invasion of Ukraine, he joined the Ukrainian Territorial Defense Forces. Shortly afterwards, he made an a cappella recording of the first verse of the Ukrainian folk song "Oh, the Red Viburnum in the Meadow" (Ukrainian: Ой у лузі червона калина), which became viral on social media. Khlyvnyuk, wearing fatigues and carrying an automatic rifle, videoed his performance in Sophia Square in Kyiv, with the Bell Tower of Saint Sophia Cathedral in the background, and posted it on Instagram on February 27.

Subsequently, the South African musician The Kiffness also supported the Ukrainian people in the war against the Russian army and made a remix of the recording.

On March 26 Khlyvnyuk's unit came under mortar fire, losing two pickup trucks and Khlyvnyuk receiving a shrapnel wound to the face.

He moved from the Territorial Defense Forces to serving in the National Police of Ukraine.

=== Pink Floyd collaboration ===
David Gilmour of Pink Floyd used Khlyvnyuk's recording of "Oh, the Red Viburnum..." as the vocal track on Pink Floyd's April 2022 single "Hey, Hey, Rise Up!" in support of Ukraine.

== Awards ==
Andriy became the winner of the Yuna Music Award in 2012 and 2013 in the nomination "Best Lyricist".

He received the YUNA Award in 2016 in the nominations for Best Song ("Злива") and Best Duet (Jamala, Andriy Khlyvnyuk, Dmytro Shurov "Злива").

In 2022, Andiry was presented with the Order for Courage 3d class.

== Personal life ==
In July 2010, information appeared that Khlyvnyuk married Hanna Kopylova, a graduate of the Faculty of Journalism of Kyiv University Shevchenko, the daughter of Vadym Kopylov, who at that time was the Deputy Minister of Finance of Ukraine. Andriy and Hanna have a son Ivan (born in 2010) and a daughter Oleksandra (born in 2013). In 2020, he divorced his wife.

== TV ==
In the summer of 2015, Khlyvnyuk became one of the jury members of the sixth season of the X-factor vocal competition on the Ukrainian STB TV channel, replacing Ivan Dorn.
