= The Kiffness =

South African musician and producer (born 1988)

David Scott
- Also known as: The Kiffness
- Born: David Scott; 11 February 1988 (age 38); Cape Town, South Africa
- Education: University of the Witwatersrand, Rhodes University
- Genres: Electronic; parody
- Occupation: Musician
- Years active: 2013–present
- Website: thekiffness.com

YouTube information
- Subscribers: 3.28 million
- Last updated: 20 October 2026

David Scott (born 11 February 1988), also known by his stage name the Kiffness, is a South African musician, producer, and parody artist who is the founder and lead singer of the band the Kiffness. Despite the band's name, Scott is referred to as the Kiffness alone.

== Early life ==
In 2004, Scott was a member of the KwaZulu-Natal Youth Choir. He was educated at Michaelhouse school and went to the University of the Witwatersrand to study medicine. However, he dropped out and switched to studying music and philosophy at Rhodes University while working as a DJ and playing in a jazz band. In 2013, he released his first single, "Where are You Going?", with Matthew Gold, which made the 5FM Top 40. Their album Kiff was nominated at the 21st South African Music Awards in 2015 and again in 2017.

Scott usually performs wearing a floral custom suit that he had made in Vietnam, with material selected by his wife and himself, as it resembled his grandmother's curtains.

== Music career ==
Scott creates satirical songs that are mostly aimed at South African political issues. In 2017, he released a track called "White Privilege" as an attempt to make white South Africans more socially aware. In 2018, he filmed a video for his Afrikaans song "Pragtig Meisie", with a picture of the Afrikaner nationalist singer Steve Hofmeyr's face on a blow-up doll.

In 2019, Scott banned the South African Broadcasting Corporation from playing his music when it emerged they had not been paying musicians for playing their songs, and he alleged he was owed R60,000. The same year, he launched a solo career. In 2020, the Kiffness parodied the national anthem of South Africa for a song called "Nkosazan' Dlamini Trafficker", as part of criticism of Nkosazana Dlamini-Zuma's ban on the sale of cigarettes during the COVID-19 lockdown. Then-mayor of Ekurhuleni, Mzwandile Masina, criticised Scott for this, claiming it was racist. Scott and Masina later discussed it over the phone, with the musician defending his work as satire. He also wrote other lockdown parody songs and created a spoof of "Jerusalema" aimed at the Economic Freedom Fighters (EFF) leader Julius Malema, following EFF activists attacking Clicks shops over a shampoo advertisement that they considered racist.

In late 2020, Scott collaborated with Turkish musician Bilal Göregen in a remix of Göregen's rendition of "Ievan polkka" that went viral on YouTube. In 2021, he created a song parodying Miriam Makeba's "The Click Song" to assist people with pronouncing the new names of Port Elizabeth, King William's Town, and Maclear after the South African government changed them.

In September 2024, Scott produced a video satirising a claim made by Republican presidential candidate Donald Trump in that month's presidential debate. Trump repeated unverified reports that Haitian immigrants in Springfield, Ohio, were eating cats and dogs kept as pets by members of the local community. The claim was subsequently denied by the mayor of Springfield, Rob Rue, and widely ridiculed in the media. Scott's video, "Eating the Cats", went viral on social media and was viewed over one million times on X within 24 hours of its posting. Scott pledged to donate all proceeds to the Clark County SPCA in Springfield, raising over $20,000 for the organization. On 18 September, the Kiffness performed "Eating the Cats" live in Munich, Germany, and he has continued to play it at subsequent concerts.

In 2025, Scott was selected to perform in the Summer Sunset Concerts lineup at the Kirstenbosch National Botanical Garden in Cape Town. After reports emerged that activists affiliated with the Palestine Solidarity Campaign (PSC) had organised protests in an attempt to have him removed from the lineup, concert organisers, including SANBI, announced that the series would proceed as planned, with increased security at the venue. PSC has alleged that has Scott made racist and Islamophobic tweets on his X account. His inclusion in the event was supported by South African community groups and fans, including singer Heinz Winckler.

In February 2026, Scott collaborated with the American musician Matisyahu on a remix of Matisyahu's song "One Day", built around a viral video of two Filipino children singing the song. Matisyahu also recorded new vocals for the track. Scott described the song as "a musical prayer for peace" and said it was the first time an original artist had collaborated with him on one of his remixes.

== Activism ==
In 2016, Scott paid tribute to the victims of the Orlando, Florida Pulse nightclub shooting by releasing a song called "You Say You Love Me".

In 2021, Scott raised over R 100,000 for the SPCA in Sandton with the release of his Cat Jams EP.

During the 2022 Russian invasion of Ukraine, Scott supported Ukraine by remixing the Ukrainian folk song "Oi u luzi chervona kalyna", performed by Boombox frontman Andriy Khlyvnyuk. The latter cancelled his American tour to defend his country against the invasion by the Russian Armed Forces. Royalties from the remix were intended to go toward humanitarian aid for the Armed Forces of Ukraine.
