= BoomBox (Ukrainian band) =

Ukrainian band

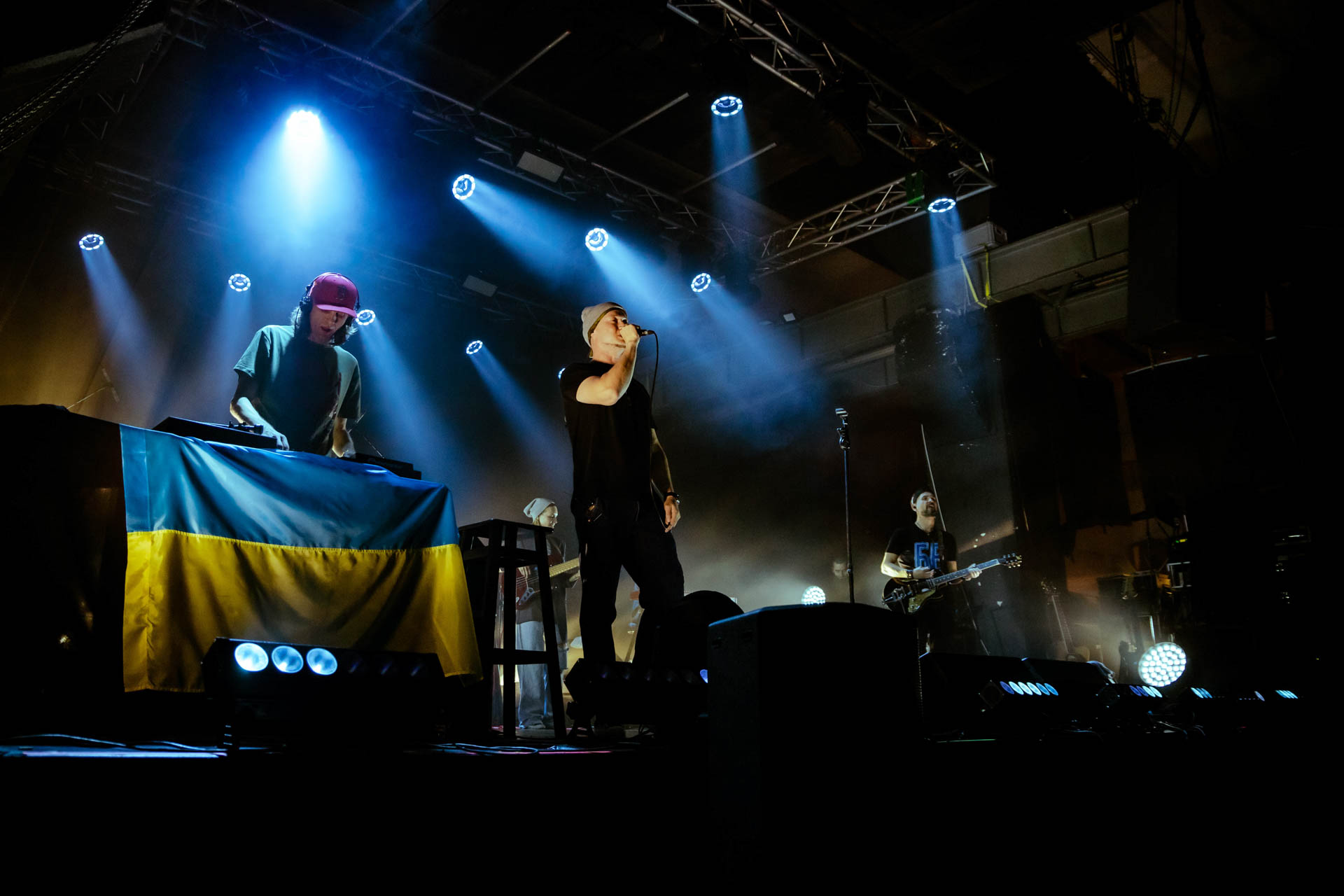
- BoomBox in 2022

Background information
- Origin: Kyiv, Ukraine
- Genres: Funk rock; funk; rock and roll; reggae; hip-hop
- Years active: 2004–present
- Labels: Moon; Vdokh

BoomBox (also in Ukrainian: Бумбокс, romanized: Bumboks) is a Ukrainian rock and pop band formed in 2004 by singer Andriy Khlyvnyuk and guitarist Andriy Samoilo. Their songs are written predominantly in Ukrainian, with albums and singles including some songs in Russian and English.

The band is a member of the association of independent musicians "Vdoh".

They recorded their first album Меломанія (Melomania) in just 19 hours and released it in April 2005.

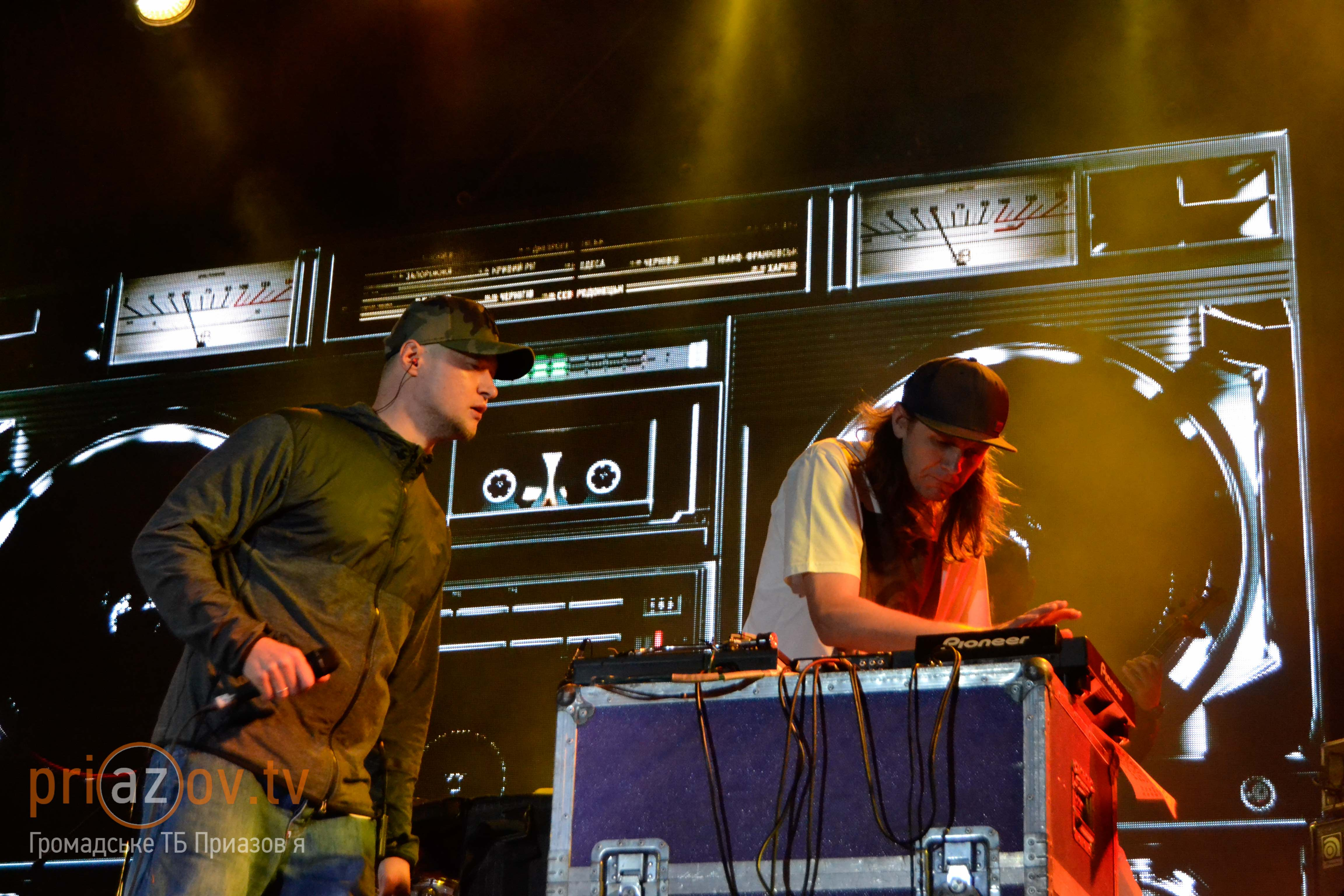
BoomBox 2017 in Mariupol

The band has performed in cities throughout Ukraine, including Lviv, Odesa, Kovel, Uzhhorod and, as recently as the beginning of 2022, in Kyiv. They have performed in other European countries, the United States, and Canada. In 2015 they conducted a ten-year-anniversary tour in North America.

BoomBox was scheduled to perform in London at a show in support of the Belarus Free Theatre in 2015. Khlyvnyuk was unable to get there due to visa problems, so instead of performing their own set, the rest of the band backed Pink Floyd's David Gilmour, playing a selection of Pink Floyd and Gilmour solo pieces.

After the 2014 Russian annexation of Crimea the band stopped performing in Russia. When Russia invaded Ukraine in 2022, the band postponed a tour of North America and all the members joined the Ukrainian Territorial Defense Forces. Khlyvnyuk recorded an a cappella version of the Ukrainian folk song "Oh, the Red Viburnum in the Meadow" in Kyiv while dressed in a military uniform, and posted it on social media. South African musician The Kiffness made a remix of Khlyvnyuk's recording, to support Ukraine. Pink Floyd, led by David Gilmour, wrote and recorded the single "Hey, Hey, Rise Up!", incorporating Khlyvnyuk's recorded vocals, and released it in April 2022 in support of Ukraine.

== Discography ==
- Меломанія (Melomania) (2005)
- Family бізнес (Family Business) (2006)
- III (2008)
- Все включено (All included) (2010)
- Середній Вiк (Middle Age) (2011)
- Термінал Б (Terminal B) (2013)
- Люди (People) (2016)
- Голий король (Naked King) (2017)
- Таємний код: Рубікон. Частина 1 (2019)
- Таємний код: Рубікон. Частина 2 (2019)
