= Mountain Tracks: Volume 4 =

Live album by the Yonder Mountain String Band
- Released: February 7, 2006
- Recorded: 2005
- Genre: Progressive bluegrass Jam band
- Length: 49:58
- Label: Frog Pad Records

Yonder Mountain String Band chronology
Mountain Tracks: Volume 3 (2006)	Mountain Tracks: Volume 4 (2006)	Yonder Mountain String Band (2006)

Professional ratings
Review scores
Source	Rating
Allmusic	3.5/5 stars

Mountain Tracks: Volume 4 is a progressive bluegrass live album by the Yonder Mountain String Band. It was released February 7, 2006 by Frog Pad Records. The album contains a DVD named The Europe Bootlegs which was recorded during the band's first tour of Europe in July 2003.

== Track listing ==
No.	Title	Writer(s)	Location	Length
1.	"Girlfriend Is Better" (Talking Heads cover)	David Byrne, Chris Frantz, Jerry Harrison, Tina Weymouth	The BIG Summer Classic, Red Rocks Amphitheatre, Morrison, CO, July 3, 2005.	13:28
2.	"Another Day"	Adam Aijala	The BIG Summer Classic, Red Rocks Amphitheatre, Morrison, CO, July 3, 2005.	3:01
3.	"Looking Back Over My Shoulders"	Ben Kaufmann	The Music Mill, Indianapolis, IN, April 24, 2005	8:54
4.	"Corona" (Minutemen cover)	D. Boon	Sheridan Opera House, Telluride, CO, January 27, 2005	2:19
5.	"River"	Ben Kaufmann	The Orange Peel, Asheville, NC, February 20, 2005	3:35
6.	"Ruby > Robots! > Ruby"	Traditional (Ruby), Adam Aijala, Jeff Austin, Dave Johnston, Ben Kaufmann	The Belly Up Tavern, Solana Beach, CA, April 15, 2005	18:41
Total length:				49:58

== Chart performance ==
=== Album ===
Chart (2006)	Peak position
U.S. Billboard Top Bluegrass Albums	3
U.S. Billboard Top Country Albums	63

== Personnel ==
=== Yonder Mountain String Band ===
- Dave Johnston – banjo, vocals
- Jeff Austin – mandolin, vocals
- Ben Kaufmann – bass, vocals
- Adam Aijala – guitar, vocals

=== Technical ===
- Kari Amundson – engineer, camera operator
- Matthew Gardner – technical advisor
- Simon Gardner – contributor
- Bobby Ray – engineer, camera operator
- Leland Russell – engineer, editing, mixing, camera operator, cinematography
