= Yonder Mountain String Band (album) =

Studio album by the Yonder Mountain String Band
- Released: May 9, 2006
- Genre: Progressive bluegrass
- Length: 41:49
- Label: Vanguard
- Producer: Tom Rothrock

Yonder Mountain String Band chronology
Mountain Tracks: Volume 4 (2006)	Yonder Mountain String Band (2006)

Professional ratings
Review scores
Source	Rating

Yonder Mountain String Band is an eponymous progressive bluegrass album by the Yonder Mountain String Band. It was released May 9, 2006 by Vanguard Records.

== Track listing ==
1. "Sidewalk Stars" (Adam Aijala, Jeff Austin, Dave Johnston, Ben Kaufmann, Tom Rothrock) – 4:13
2. "I Ain't Been Myself in Years" (Benny Galloway) – 3:08
3. "How 'Bout You?" (Aijala, Austin, Johnston, Kaufmann, Rothrock) – 3:46
4. "Angel" (Aijala, Austin, Johnston, Kaufmann, Rothrock) – 4:48
5. "Fastball" (Aijala, Austin, Johnston, Kaufmann, Rothrock) – 1:06
6. "East Nashville Easter" (Austin, T. Snider) – 4:49
7. "Just the Same" (Johnston) – 4:02
8. "Classic Situation" (Aijala, Austin, Johnston, Kaufmann, Rothrock) – 3:22
9. "Night Out" (Aijala, Johnston) – 3:38
10. "Midwest Gospel Radio" (Aijala, Austin, Johnston, Kaufmann, Rothrock) – 2:50
11. "Troubled Mind" (Kaufmann) – 3:35
12. "Wind's on Fire" (Johnston) – 2:32

== Chart performance ==
=== Album ===
Chart (2006)	Peak position
U.S. Billboard Top Bluegrass Albums	1
U.S. Billboard Top Country Albums	57
U.S. Billboard Top Heatseekers	39
U.S. Billboard Independent Albums	43

== Personnel ==
=== Yonder Mountain String Band ===
- Dave Johnston – banjo, vocals, acoustic guitar on tracks 1 & 12
- Jeff Austin – mandolin, vocals, guitar on track 8
- Ben Kaufmann – bass, vocals, acoustic guitar on track 3, electric piano on track 3, piano on track 12
- Adam Aijala – acoustic guitar, vocals, electric guitar on track 3, slide guitar on track 12

=== Other musicians ===
- Darol Anger – fiddle on track 4
- Tom Rothrock – thumb, 1/4 cable & amplifier on track 5, beats on track 10
- Pete Thomas – drums on tracks 3 & 8

=== Technical ===
- David Raccuglia – photography
- Tom Rothrock – producer, amplifiers, beats
- Mike Tarantino – engineer
- Don C. Tyler – mastering
