= Town by Town =

Studio album by the Yonder Mountain String Band
- Released: 2001
- Recorded: January 7–March 19, 2001
- Genre: Progressive bluegrass Jam band
- Length: 59:46
- Label: Frog Pad Records
- Producer: Tim O'Brien

Yonder Mountain String Band chronology
Mountain Tracks: Volume 1 (2001)	Town by Town (2001)	Mountain Tracks: Volume 2 (2002)

Professional ratings
Review scores
Source	Rating
Allmusic	3/5 stars

Town by Town is the third studio album by the progressive bluegrass collective Yonder Mountain String Band. It was released in 2001 by Frog Pad Records. A song is hidden after three minutes of silence on the track "Peace of Mind".

The song "To See You Coming 'Round the Bend" was sampled by Bubba Sparxxx for the song "Comin' Round" for the album Deliverance.

== Track listing ==
1. "Rambler's Anthem" (Ben Kaufmann) – 2:53
2. "Easy as Pie" (Dave Johnston) – 3:37
3. "Idaho" (Adam Aijala, Carter) – 2:27
4. "Loved You Enough" (Johnston) – 2:46
5. "Sorrow Is a Highway" (Jeff Austin) – 3:54
6. "Must've Had Your Reasons" (Kaufmann) – 3:04
7. "Wildewood Drive" (Aijala) – 4:42
8. "New Horizons" (Austin) – 7:11
9. "Check Out Time" (Benny Galloway, Johnston) – 3:16
10. "To See You Coming 'Round the Bend" (Kaufmann) – 3:23
11. "Red Tail Lights" (Johnston) – 2:58
12. "A Father's Arms" (Aijala) – 3:24
13. "Hog Potato" (Johnston) – 3:50
14. "Peace of Mind" (Austin) – 12:21
15. "Boatman's Dance" [Untitled Hidden Track] – 6:14

== Personnel ==
=== Yonder Mountain String Band ===
- Dave Johnston – banjo, vocals
- Jeff Austin – mandolin, vocals
- Ben Kaufmann – bass, vocals
- Adam Aijala – guitar, vocals

=== Other musicians ===
- Tim O'Brien – bouzouki, fiddle

=== Technical ===
- Lorne Bregitzer – engineer
- David Glasser – mastering
- Tim O'Brien – producer
- Bob Stovern – artwork
- James Tuttle – engineer, mixing
- Michael Weinstein – photography
