= Old Hands =

Studio album by the Yonder Mountain String Band
- Released: June 17, 2003
- Genre: Progressive bluegrass Folk; Country
- Length: mm:ss
- Label: Frog Pad Records FP0103
- Producer: Sally Van Meter

Yonder Mountain String Band chronology
Mountain Tracks: Volume 2 (2002)	Old Hands (2003)	Mountain Tracks: Volume 3 (2004)

Professional ratings
Review scores
Source	Rating
Allmusic	3/5 stars

Old Hands is a progressive bluegrass studio album by the Yonder Mountain String Band. It was released June 17, 2003 by Frog Pad Records.

The album contains thirteen tracks written by Benny Galloway, who also performs some of them with the band, contributing lead guitar, rhythm guitar, or vocals. He also designed the guitar emblem on the album cover.

== Track listing ==
1. "Pride of Alabama" (Benny Galloway)
2. "Hill Country Girl" (Bruce Allsopp, Galloway)
3. "Big Lights" (Galloway)
4. "Deep Pockets" (Galloway, Dave Johnston)
5. "Sleepy Cowboy" (Galloway)
6. "Train Bound for Glory Land" (Galloway)
7. "Wind Through the Willows" (Galloway)
8. "Not Far Away" (Galloway)
9. "And Going Away" (Galloway)
10. "Alone and Blue" (Galloway, Ken Spoor)
11. "Everytime" (Galloway)
12. "Winds o' Wyoming" (Galloway)
13. "Behold, the Rock of Ages" (Galloway)

== Chart performance ==
=== Album ===
Chart (2003)	Peak position
U.S. Billboard Top Bluegrass Albums	5
U.S. Billboard Top Country Albums	54

== Personnel ==
=== Yonder Mountain String Band ===
- Dave Johnston – banjo, vocals
- Jeff Austin – mandolin, vocals
- Ben Kaufmann – bass, vocals
- Adam Aijala – guitar, vocals

=== Other musicians ===
- Jerry Douglas – dobro
- Darol Anger – fiddle
- Sally Van Meter – vocals, slide guitar, resonator guitar
- Tim O'Brien – fiddle, harmony vocals
- Dirk Powell – accordion
- Casey Driessen – fiddle
- Benny Galloway – guitar, rhythm guitar, vocals

=== Technical ===
- David Glasser – mastering
- Sally Van Meter – arranger, producer
- James Tuttle – engineer
- Yonder Mountain String Band – arranger
- Benny Galloway – logo design
- Bryce Wisdom – artwork
