= Goodbye Blue Sky =

Song by Pink Floyd

from the album The Wall
- Released: 30 November 1979
- Recorded: April – November 1979
- Genre: Progressive rock
- Length: 2:45
- Label: Harvest (UK); Columbia (US)
- Songwriter: Roger Waters
- Producers: Bob Ezrin; David Gilmour; James Guthrie; Roger Waters

Goodbye Blue Sky is a song by the English rock band Pink Floyd, written by Roger Waters. It appears on their 1979 double album, The Wall. The recording prominently features David Gilmour on acoustic guitar, lead and harmony vocals, bass guitar and synthesizer, with Roger Waters and Richard Wright also contributing synthesizers.

== Lyrics ==
In a brief prologue, a skylark is heard chirping. The sound of approaching bombers catches the attention of a child (voiced by a young Harry Waters), who states, "Look Mummy, there's an aeroplane up in the sky".

The lyrics go on to describe the memory of the Blitz: "Did you see the frightened ones? Did you hear the falling bombs? Did you ever wonder why we had to run for shelter when the promise of a brave new world unfurled beneath the clear blue sky? ... The flames are all long gone, but the pain lingers on."

== Film version ==
In the film version, this segment is animated by Gerald Scarfe. It begins in live-action with a cat trying to catch the white dove but then flies away. It transitions to animation with the dove flying peacefully up only to suddenly be gorily torn apart by a black Nazi eagle (Reichsadler). It glides over the countryside and swoops down to grasp the earth with its talons, ripping up a huge section leaving a sulfurous trail in its wake, giving way to a warlord that morphs into a metallic factory that releases warplanes. Next, naked, gas-masked people (the frightened ones) are seen running about on all fours and hiding from The Blitz. The warplanes turned into crosses just as the Union Jack fragments into a bleeding cross. The Nazi eagle crashes and shatters and the dove emerges from it while the dead soldiers are able to finally rest in peace. Finally, the blood from the cross runs down the hill and into a storm drain.

Unlike the album, this comes in after the reprise of "When the Tigers Broke Free" and before "The Happiest Days of Our Lives".

== Live versions ==
For the 1990 large-scale concert The Wall – Live in Berlin, vocals for this song were provided by Joni Mitchell, with visuals largely reprised from the film version.

Roger Waters' 2010–13 tour The Wall Live uses the song to depict a metaphorical "cultural bombing". As bomber planes fly in from the distance, they drop not bombs, but dollar signs, euro signs, religious symbols, and corporate logos. This imagery ended up attracting controversy due to the juxtaposition of dollar signs and the Star of David, which was deemed antisemitic by the Anti-Defamation League; Waters later removed the offending iconography and wrote an open letter to The Independent clarifying that the Star was meant to critique the Israeli government.

== Personnel ==
- David Gilmour – lead and harmony vocals, acoustic guitars, bass guitar, Prophet-5 synthesiser
- Roger Waters – EMS VCS 3 synthesiser
- Richard Wright – Prophet-5 synthesiser
- Harry Waters – child's voice

== Cover versions ==
- On Ann Wilson's 2007 solo album, Hope & Glory, there is a version with her sister Nancy. The Wilson sisters' band, Heart, also released a live version of the song on Dreamboat Annie Live.
- The song appears on Yonder Mountain String Band's 2002 live album Mountain Tracks: Volume 2 as a hidden track after "Follow Me Down to the Riverside".
- The song has been covered by Yes and System of a Down.

== Legacy ==
- The song was used in the Rick and Morty episode "A Rick in King Mortur's Mort".

== See also ==
- List of anti-war songs
