= Mountain Tracks: Volume 2 =

Live album by the Yonder Mountain String Band
- Released: August 20, 2002
- Recorded: In Boulder, Colorado; Portland, Oregon; and Eugene, Oregon, between September 28 and November 3, 2001
- Genre: Progressive bluegrass Jam band
- Length: 69:58
- Label: SCI Fidelity 5176

Yonder Mountain String Band chronology
Town by Town (2001)	Mountain Tracks: Volume 2 (2002)	Old Hands (2003)

Professional ratings
Review scores
Source	Rating
Allmusic	3/5 stars

Mountain Tracks: Volume 2 is a progressive bluegrass live album by the Yonder Mountain String Band. It was released August 20, 2002 by SCI Fidelity, a Boulder-based independent record label.

The album was recorded and compiled from three different live performances in Boulder, Colorado, Portland, Oregon, and Eugene, Oregon. It is the second volume of the Mountain Tracks live series.

The song "Goodbye Blue Sky" by Pink Floyd is performed as a hidden song after "Follow Me Down to the Riverside".

== Track listing ==
1. "At the End of the Day" (Jeff Austin) – 4:38
2. "Dawn's Early Light" (Austin) – 11:05
3. "Two Hits and the Joint Turned Brown" (John Hartford) – 3:37
4. "Raleigh and Spencer" (Traditional) – 5:26
5. "Good Hearted Woman" (Waylon Jennings, Willie Nelson) – 4:03
6. "No Expectations" (Mick Jagger, Keith Richards) – 10:02
7. "Peace of Mind/ Follow Me Down to the Riverside/ Peace of Mind" (Austin) – 27:18
8. "Untitled" (Goodbye Blue Sky); 3:49

== Personnel ==
=== Yonder Mountain String Band ===
- Dave Johnston – banjo, vocals
- Jeff Austin – mandolin, vocals
- Ben Kaufmann – bass, vocals
- Adam Aijala – guitar, vocals

=== Technical ===
- David Glasser – mastering
- Bob Stovern – CD layout
- James Tuttle – mixing
