= Elevation (Yonder Mountain String Band album) =

Studio album by the Yonder Mountain String Band
- Released: 1999
- Recorded: September 14–17, 1999
- Genre: Progressive bluegrass
- Length: 56:30
- Label: Frog Pad Records
- Producer: Sally Van Meter

Yonder Mountain String Band chronology
Elevation (1999)	Mountain Tracks: Volume 1 (2001)

Professional ratings
Review scores
Source	Rating
Allmusic	3/5 stars

Elevation is the progressive bluegrass debut album of the Yonder Mountain String Band. It was released in 1999 by Frog Pad Records, an independent record label run by the band. The album features appearances by bluegrass musicians Mike Marshall and Darol Anger.

== Track listing ==
1. "Half Moon Rising" – 4:31
2. "Mental Breakdown" – 2:57
3. "The Bolton Stretch" – 2:45
4. "Left Me in a Hole" – 5:25
5. "Darkness and Light" – 5:23
6. "On the Run" – 3:49
7. "Eight Cylinders" – 3:53
8. "40 Miles from Denver" – 3:46
9. "This Lonesome Heart" – 2:06
10. "At the End of the Day" – 3:38
11. "Mossy Cow" – 2:46
12. "High on a Hilltop" – 2:42
13. "To Say Goodbye, to Be Forgiven" – 3:41
14. "If There's Still Ramblin' in the Rambler (Let Him Go)" – 2:46
15. "Waijal Breakdown" – 6:22

== Personnel ==
=== Yonder Mountain String Band ===
- Dave Johnston – banjo, vocals
- Jeff Austin – mandolin, vocals
- Ben Kaufmann – bass, vocals
- Adam Aijala – guitar, vocals, banjo on track 15

=== Other musicians ===
- Darol Anger – fiddle on tracks 11 & 15
- Celeste Krenz – additional vocals on track 7
- Mike Marshall – mandolin on track 15
- Sally Van Meter – electric lap slide on track 7, additional vocals on track 7, resophonic guitar on track 8

=== Technical ===
- David Glasser – mastering
- Dave Hardy – photography
- James Tuttle – engineer, mixing
