= Mountain Tracks: Volume 3 =

Live album by the Yonder Mountain String Band
- Released: September 14, 2004
- Recorded: In Lyons, Colorado, on September 12–13, 2003
- Genre: Progressive bluegrass Jam band
- Length: 121:12
- Label: SCI Fidelity; Frog Pad Records

Yonder Mountain String Band chronology
Old Hands (2003)	Mountain Tracks: Volume 3 (2004)	Mountain Tracks: Volume 4 (2006)

Professional ratings
Review scores
Source	Rating
Allmusic	3.5/5 stars

Mountain Tracks: Volume 3 is a progressive bluegrass live album by the Yonder Mountain String Band; it is part of the live series Mountain Tracks. It was released on September 14, 2004 by SCI Fidelity.

The album occupies two discs. The first disc carries the band's performance on September 12; the second carries the concert performed on September 13. The concert features a guest appearance by fiddler Darol Anger. The song "Ring of Fire" by Johnny Cash is a hidden song at the end of the first disc and was performed when news was received of the deaths of Johnny Cash and actor John Ritter earlier in the day.

== Track listing ==
=== Disc one ===
1. "Bloody Mary Morning" (Willie Nelson) – 3:14
2. "Coo Coo's Nest" (w/ Jeff Austin & Adam Aijala) (John Hartford) – 3:23
3. "Town" (Ben Kaufmann) – 2:27
4. "If There's Still Ramblin' in the Rambler (Let Him Go)" (Jeff Austin) – 3:42
5. "Steep Grade, Sharp Curves / Ramblin' Reprise" (Austin) – 7:05
6. "Traffic Jam" (Kaufmann) – 10:28
7. "Years With Rose" (Benny Galloway) – 7:16
8. "Winds O' Wyoming" (Galloway) – 4:17
9. "Traffic Jam" (Kaufmann) – 4:36
10. "Holding" (Hartford) – 8:57

=== Disc two ===
1. "Queen of the Earth" (Traditional) – 3:21
2. "Train Bound for Glory Land" (Galloway) – 3:55
3. "Little Rabbit" (Traditional) – 7:46
4. "Left Me in a Hole" (Adam Aijala) – 5:40
5. "Old Plank Road" (w/ Sally Truitt) (Traditional) – 3:01
6. "Deep Pockets" (Galloway, Dave Johnston) – 3:54
7. "Maid of the Canyon" (Johnston) – 3:59
8. "Too Late Now" (Austin) – 6:19
9. "Yee Haw Factor" (w/Pastor Tim) (Yonder Mountain String Band) – 0:45
10. "Kentucky Mandolin" (Bill Monroe) – 8:53
11. "Peace of Mind" (Austin) – 5:30
12. "Snow on the Pines" (Austin) – 8:37
13. "Peace of Mind" (w/ Rushad Eggleston & Brittany Haas) (Austin) – 4:07

== Chart performance ==
=== Album ===
Chart (2004)	Peak position
U.S. Billboard Top Bluegrass Albums	2
U.S. Billboard Top Country Albums	67

== Personnel ==
=== Yonder Mountain String Band ===
- Dave Johnston – banjo, vocals
- Jeff Austin – mandolin, vocals
- Ben Kaufmann – bass, vocals
- Adam Aijala – guitar, vocals

=== Other musicians ===
- Darol Anger – fiddle

=== Technical ===
- Brad Burleson – engineer
- Brian Langeliers – layout design
- Whitney Maxwell – photography
- Paul Rennix – photography
- Gordon Wilson – photography
- Robert "Dandy" Thompson – cover photograph
- Sandy Walczak – cover photograph
- James Tuttle – mixing
- Bryce Wisdom – artwork
