= Mountain Tracks: Volume 1 =

Live album by the Yonder Mountain String Band
- Released: 2001
- Recorded: September 29–30, 2000 at the Fox Theatre in Boulder, Colorado
- Genre: Progressive bluegrass Jam band
- Length: 56:47
- Label: Frog Pad Records
- Producer: Yonder Mountain String Band

Yonder Mountain String Band chronology
Elevation (1999)	Mountain Tracks: Volume 1 (2001)	Town by Town (2001)

Professional ratings
Review scores
Source	Rating
Allmusic	3/5 stars

Mountain Tracks: Volume 1 is a progressive bluegrass live album by the Yonder Mountain String Band. It was released in 2001 by Frog Pad Records.

The first in a growing series of live releases, it was recorded over the course of two days at the Fox Theatre in Boulder, Colorado.

== Track listing ==
1. "Sharecropper's Son" (Carter Stanley) – 3:06
2. "Keep on Going" (Jeff Austin) – 12:05
3. "My Gal" (Traditional) – 5:52
4. "Snow on the Pines" (Austin) – 14:36
5. "Whiskey Before Breakfast" (Traditional) – 3:02
6. "If You're Ever in Oklahoma > Elzic's Farewell > If You're Ever in Oklahoma" (J. J. Cale, Traditional) – 18:06

== Personnel ==
=== Yonder Mountain String Band ===
- Dave Johnston – banjo, vocals
- Jeff Austin – mandolin, vocals
- Ben Kaufmann – bass, vocals
- Adam Aijala – guitar, vocals

=== Technical ===
- Michael R. Everett – artwork
- David Glasser – mastering
- Chris Mickle – engineer, editing, assistant producer
- James Tuttle – mixing
- Yonder Mountain String Band – arranger
