= The Wall Live (2010–2013) =

2010–13 concert tour by Roger Waters

- Tour by Roger Waters
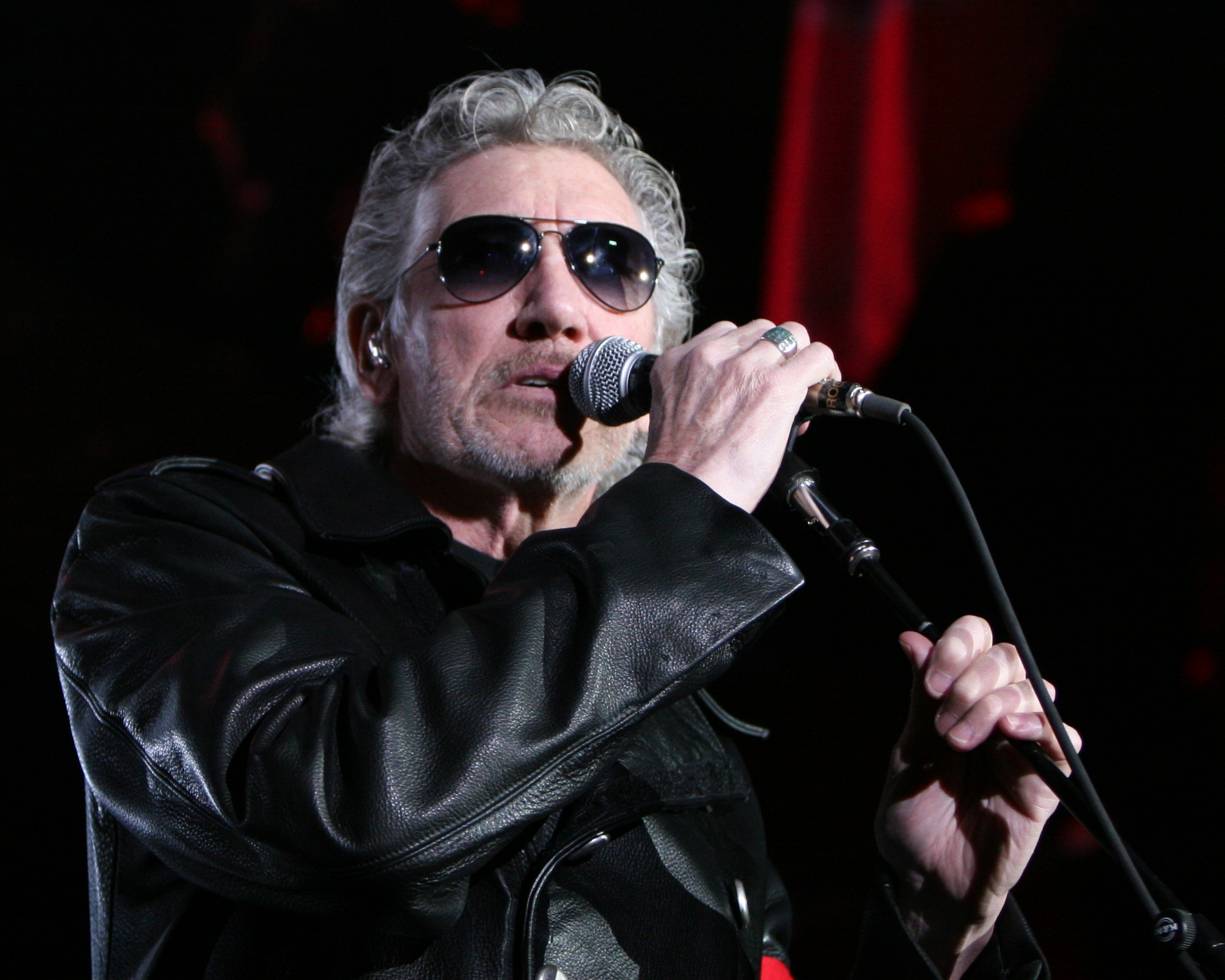
- Location: Europe; North America; Oceania; South America
- Associated album: The Wall
- Start date: 15 September 2010
- End date: 21 September 2013
- Legs: 6
- No. of shows: 219
- Box office: US$ 458.6 million (US$ 834.2 million in 2023 dollars)

Roger Waters concert chronology
- The Dark Side of the Moon Live (2006–08); The Wall Live (2010–13); Us + Them Tour (2017–18)

The Wall Live was a worldwide concert tour by Roger Waters, formerly of Pink Floyd. The tour is the first time the Pink Floyd album The Wall has been performed in its entirety by the band or any of its former members since Waters performed the album live in Berlin 21 July 1990. The first leg of the tour grossed in North America over $89.5 million from 56 concerts. It was the second-highest-grossing concert tour in North America in 2010 and the third-highest-grossing concert tour worldwide as of 2013. In 2013, the tour held the record for being the highest-grossing tour for a solo musician, surpassing the previous record holder, Madonna (the record was later eclipsed by Ed Sheeran). It is currently the 17th highest-grossing tour of all-time.

The tour opened on 15 September 2010 in Toronto, and moved through North America before ending the first leg of the tour in Mexico City, 21 December 2010. The European tour began 21 March 2011 in Lisbon, Portugal, and ended 12 July 2011 in Athens, Greece. In 2012, the tour included Australia, New Zealand, and South America, resuming 27 January in Perth, and ending 1 April 2012 in São Paulo. It was confirmed by Waters during an interview with Jimmy Fallon that he would be returning to North America for yet another leg of The Wall tour, beginning 27 April 2012 in Mexico City and ending 21 July 2012 in Quebec City on the Plains of Abraham, a former battlefield. This last show in Quebec City was the second largest outdoor production of "The Wall" ever – the largest being the Live in Berlin show in 1990. The tour returned to European stadiums again in summer 2013. After the 21 September 2013 Paris show he claimed on stage this to be possibly the last The Wall show, confirming rumours that there will be no further tour dates planned for 2014. Waters, a pacifist, incorporated an increased emphasis on the show's anti-war message, and he requested fans to send him pictures of loved ones who have died as a result of wars.

Snowy White (who was a session and tour musician with Pink Floyd in the 1970s, and was in the tour band for the original 1980–81 tour for The Wall) and Dave Kilminster were the first musicians confirmed to be in Waters's touring band. Kipp Lennon, Mark Lennon and Michael Lennon of the band Venice were confirmed for backing vocal duties, but Michael Lennon withdrew from the band due to rehearsal difficulties. He was replaced by cousin Pat Lennon, also of Venice. On 23 April, the full band line-up was announced on Roger Waters's Facebook page. Following a charity gig Waters performed with his former Pink Floyd bandmates on 10 July 2010, he confirmed that David Gilmour would guest on "Comfortably Numb" at one show during the tour. Gilmour appeared at the 12 May 2011 show at The O2, London playing lead guitar on "Comfortably Numb" and mandolin on "Outside the Wall", on which they were also joined by Nick Mason on tambourine.

On 24 August 2010, The Times Leader newspaper of Wilkes-Barre, Pennsylvania, reported that Waters and company were in town rehearsing for the tour at the Mohegan Sun Arena. This venue previously hosted pre-tour rehearsals and pre-tour concerts for such performers as Elton John, the Simon & Garfunkel "Old Friends" Reunion Tour in 2003 and AC/DC rehearsals in 2008 before the band's world tour. There were no rehearsals or performances; the crew used the occasion to work out technical details. On 12 September 2010, there was a rehearsal performance at the Izod Center in East Rutherford, New Jersey, for invited guests.

In 2014 Waters directed a documentary about the tour titled Roger Waters: The Wall. The film incorporated footage from the concerts in Quebec City and Athens. It premiered in the Special Presentations section of the 2014 Toronto International Film Festival.

== Personnel ==
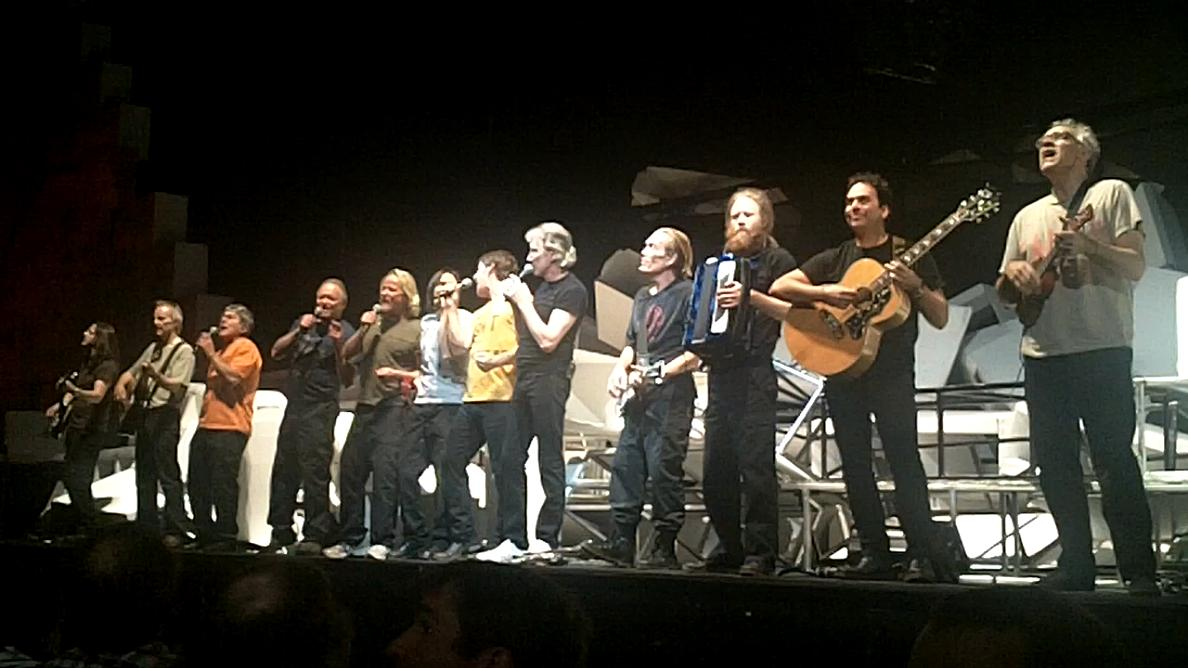
The Roger Waters Band, Kansas City, 30 October 2010 (from left to right, Kilminster, White, Joyce, Pat Lennon, Mark Lennon, Kipp Lennon, Wyckoff, Roger Waters, Smith, Harry Waters, Carin, Broad). Behind the band is the "rubble" from the destroyed wall

The following musicians have played on the tour:

- Roger Waters – bass, lead vocals, acoustic guitar, trumpet on "Outside the Wall"
- G. E. Smith – guitars, bass, mandolin on "Outside the Wall"
- Dave Kilminster – guitars, banjo on "Outside the Wall", bass on "Mother"
- Snowy White – guitars, bass on "Goodbye Blue Sky"
- Graham Broad – drums, percussion, ukulele on "Outside the Wall"
- Jon Carin – keyboards, lap steel guitar, programming, high-strung guitar on "Comfortably Numb", acoustic guitar on "Outside The Wall", electric guitar on "Run Like Hell", "Bring The Boys Back Home", "Comfortably Numb" and "Brick 3"
- Harry Waters – Hammond organ, keyboards, accordion on "Outside the Wall"
- Robbie Wyckoff – lead vocals (songs or parts of songs originally sung by David Gilmour), backing vocals, percussion
- Jon Joyce – backing vocals, percussion
- Kipp Lennon – backing vocals, percussion
- Mark Lennon – backing vocals, percussion
- Pat Lennon – backing vocals, percussion

with:

- David Gilmour – guest vocals, guitar and mandolin at Waters' London O2 show, 12 May 2011.
- Nick Mason – guest tambourine at Waters' London O2 show, 12 May 2011.

== Concert overview ==
=== Pre-show ===
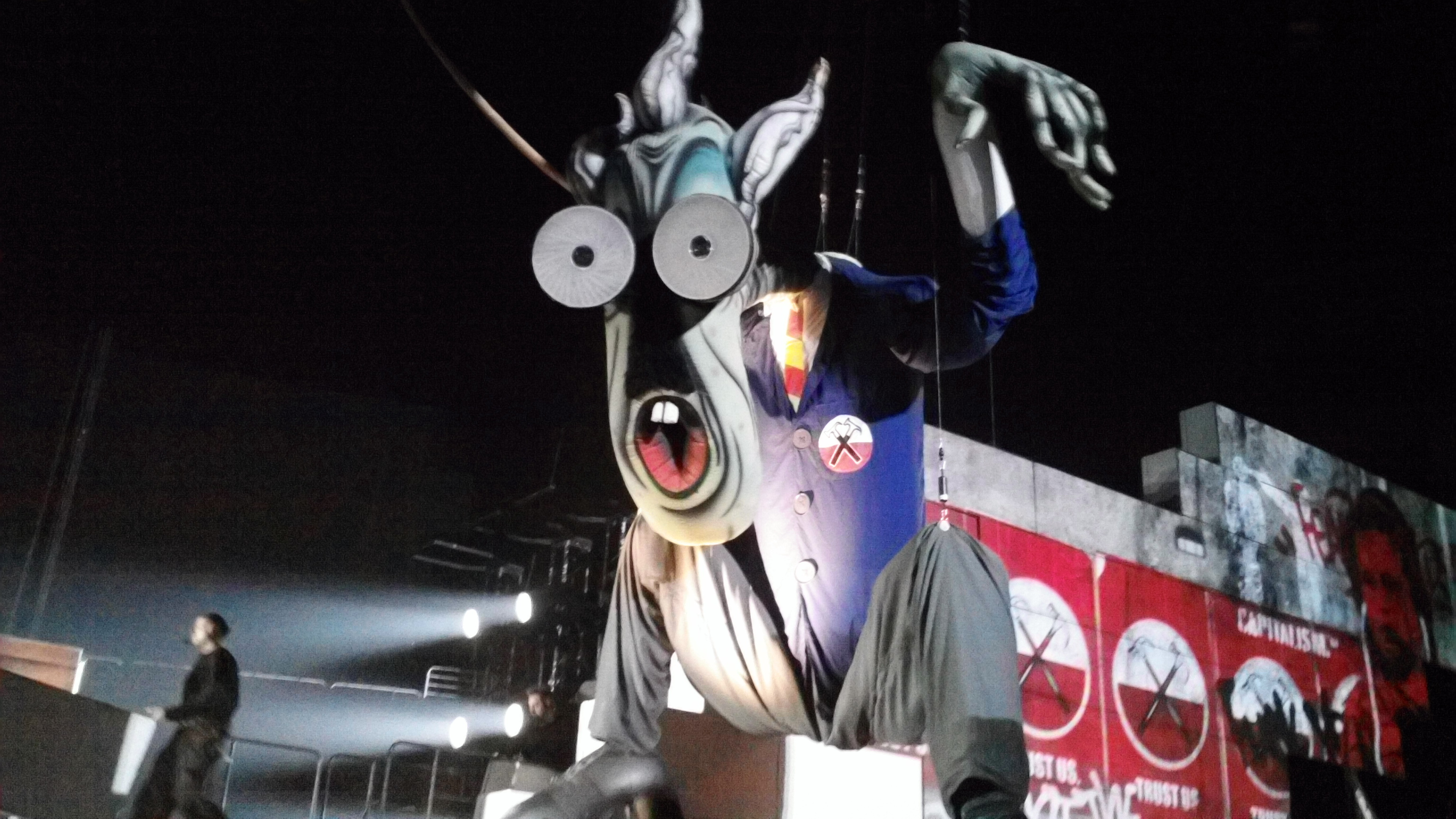
The schoolmaster puppet in Kansas City, 30 October 2010

During the pre-show, in the American part of the tour, a man who appears to be homeless pushes a shopping cart around the aisles around the floor seats. He wears a flannel jacket and a cowboy hat, and makes small talk with the fans as he makes his way around the floor. His cart is full of empty soda cans and rubbish and a sign that reads different sayings that vary from show to show, including, "No thought control" on one side and, "Homeless people need money for booze and hookers" on the other. His cart also contains the original stuffed "Pink" doll from 1979.

The pre-show audio was 20 minutes of several clips from television sitcoms and cartoons like Family Guy as well as comedy routines from George Carlin. After the first leg of the North American tour, the sound collage was dropped and replaced with 20 minutes of music in the following order for every subsequent show, "Mother" by John Lennon, "Masters of War" by Bob Dylan, "A Change Is Gonna Come" by Sam Cooke, "Imagine" by John Lennon, "Strange Fruit" by Billie Holiday, and "People Get Ready" by The Impressions.

=== The show ===
During the homeless man's tour through the crowd, the pre-show music stops and the sounds of channel surfing can be heard. When the homeless man reaches the stage, the climax of the movie Spartacus is played. A spotlight shines on him and his cart as the sounds of the slaves each claiming to be Spartacus are heard. After which, the man throws "Pink" onto the stage.

For the European shows and all shows thereafter, the homeless man was replaced with two "soldiers", bearing the crossed hammer uniform, who bring the "Pink" puppet onto the stage and hold him throughout the Spartacus clip, before dumping him on the ground and marching off the stage.

As he does this, the audio transitions to a trumpet (later revealed to be Roger Waters) playing the melody of "Outside the Wall". The trumpet playing continues unaccompanied for about a minute, until the band (unseen) unexpectedly bursts into action with "In the Flesh?". Fireworks explode across the stage during the opening chords and stage hands with 'marching hammers' arm bands and flags rise up above the band on lifts. Around mid-song, Waters emerges from the back of the stage, dressed in black. During the climax of the song, a scaled down Stuka Dive Bomber, suspended by a guide wire, flies into the wall and explodes. During "The Happiest Days of Our Lives" and "Another Brick in the Wall (Part 2)" there is a giant inflated puppet schoolmaster, an icon from the original show. Local school children are brought out onto the stage to lip-sync and dance. From the Berlin 16 June show onwards, Waters sings an acoustic reprise of "Another Brick in the Wall (Part 2)" with lyrics referring to the killing of Jean Charles de Menezes before finally greeting the audience and telling them about the filming of the original Wall Tour shows. He then sings "Mother" to a video of him playing the song from the original 1980 tour. He refers to the video as "miserable little Roger." A giant mother blow-up designed on the look of the animated version is featured as well. The song has more of a political message than before, the words "Big Brother Is Watching You" are written on the wall, with the "Br" crossed off and replaced with an "M". After the line "Mother, should I trust the government?" the words "No fucking way" are projected on the wall, as well as a local translation in non-English speaking countries.

The initial projections shown during "Goodbye Blue Sky" caused some controversy. During the song, aeroplanes are shown dropping bombs shaped like Latin crosses, hammer and sickles, dollar signs, star and crescents, Stars of David, the Shell logo, and the Mercedes-Benz logo, with the addition of the McDonald's logo in later shows. The plane dropping dollar signs appeared directly after the plane dropping the Star of David. Although Waters said in Rolling Stone that there was no relevance to the order of the bombs, he changed the order after Abraham Foxman, president of the Anti-Defamation League, complained. Waters stated, "Contrary to Mr Foxman's assertion, there are no hidden meanings in the order or juxtaposition of these symbols." These visuals were changed at Waters' request for all future shows, to avoid any sensitive juxtapositions of the symbols used in the video. At the first show of the tour, while these symbols dropped from the plane they also dropped from the ceiling of the Air Canada Centre in little cut-out shapes of confetti. During the song "Don't Leave Me Now" the production features a giant wife puppet similar in design and execution as the Schoolmaster. During the first half on the show, the wall is slowly built up brick by brick and as with the eighties tour, an instrumental called "The Last Few Bricks" that doesn't appear on the original album is played to give the stage hands extra time to build the wall. At the end of "Goodbye Cruel World", the last brick is put in place and the wall across the stage is completed. An intermission follows with photos and short bios of people lost in conflicts projected onto the wall.

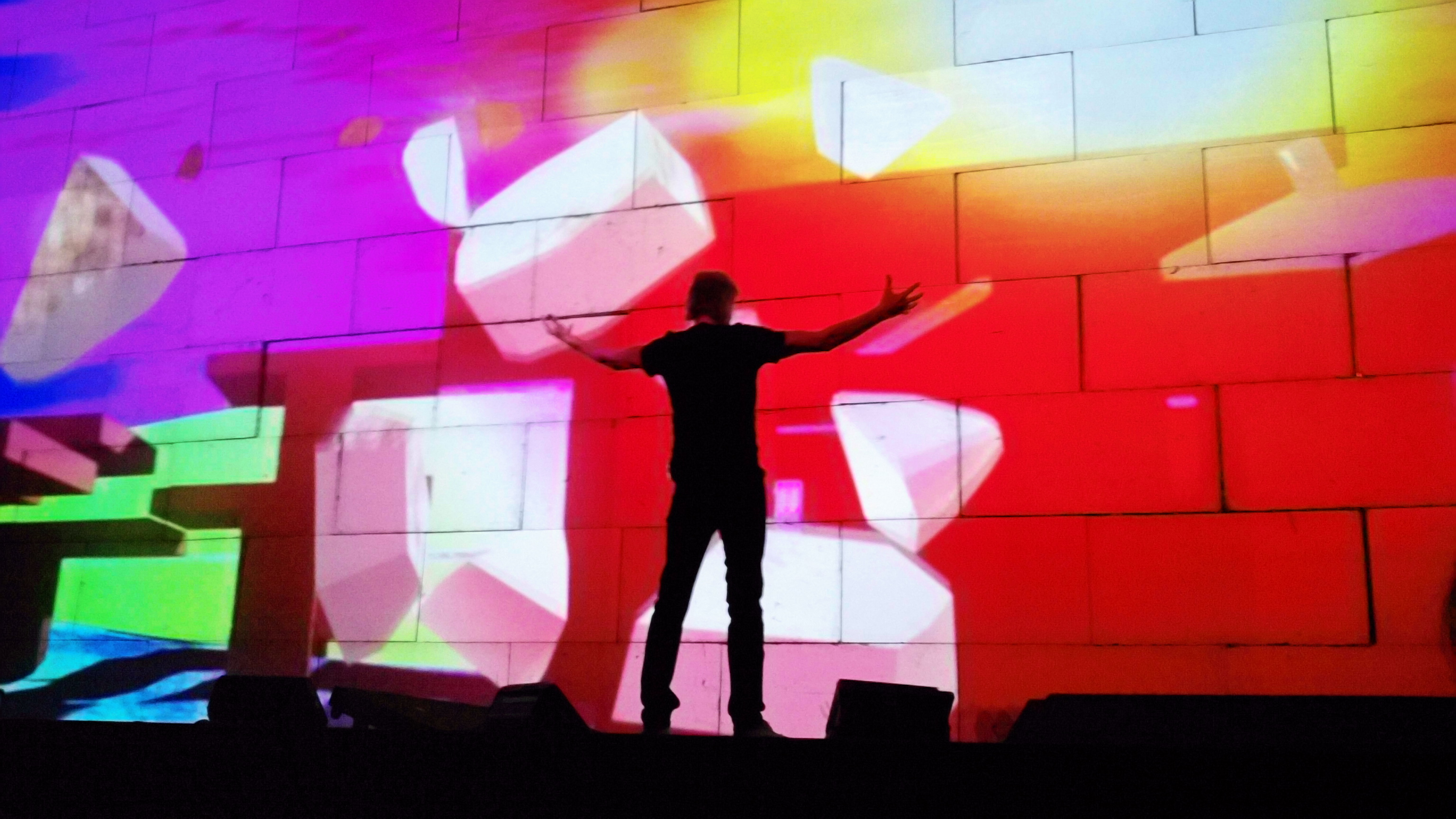
Waters performing in front of The Wall during the guitar solo to "Comfortably Numb"

The second act begins with "Hey You", which is played with minimal visuals on the wall. The band performs from behind the wall, now hidden from the audience's view. For the acoustic guitar solo piece "Is There Anybody Out There?" a brick is removed so that guitarists Dave Kilminster and G.E. Smith are visible. As "Nobody Home" begins, a section folds out of the wall revealing a small mock hotel room complete with a television, chair, lamp and unmade bed. Waters, in character as "Pink", sings the song while seated on a comfy chair that is on a platform extending from the wall. During "Vera", images of Vera Lynn are displayed on the wall, along with videos of young children being reunited with their veteran fathers. "Bring the Boys Back Home" features Dwight D. Eisenhower's American Society of Newspaper Editors speech. During "Comfortably Numb", Robbie Wyckoff and Dave Kilminster stand on top of the wall as David Gilmour did in the original tour – a performance reprised by Gilmour himself during a one-off appearance at the London O2 show on 12 May 2011. At the end of the song, the projection of the wall explodes and cinematic pillars rise.

The band plays "The Show Must Go On" dressed in black fascist attire complete with the Marching Hammers armbands. Waters' trademarked inflatable pig is released, untethered, during "In the Flesh", and guided by remote control, floats around the venue. Spotlights shine on the audience as Waters interrogates them, pointing out the "riff raff" in the room. Waters is projected onto the wall with a machine gun shooting the audience. During "Run Like Hell", images are displayed on the wall parodying the iPod lowercase "i" fad. Pictures of pigs are shown next to the words "iLead", dogs next to "iProtect", sheep next to "iFollow" (pigs, dogs, and sheep indicating their roles on the Pink Floyd album Animals), George W. Bush and other leaders next to "iBelieve", Hitler next to "iPaint", children next to "iLearn", and gravestones next to "iPay" among others. In all of the pictures, the subjects are wearing iPods. After this montage, the leaked footage from the 12 July 2007 Baghdad airstrike is played, displaying captions of the American pilots speaking and pointing out Reuters employees Saeed Chmagh and Namir Noor-Eldeen, whose cameras were mistaken for weapons; after the attack, a banner is projected onto the wall: "Namir Noor-Eldeen and Saeed Chmagh, We Will Remember You." A burst of gunfire sends it to the ground.

"Waiting for the Worms" features more of Gerald Scarfe's original animation from the film adaptation and tour, except that the infamous sequence of marching hammers has now been replaced with a new computer-generated, cel-shaded version. "Stop" abruptly blacks out the entire wall, with a lone spotlight shining upon the Pink doll from the beginning of the program, which is sitting atop the wall; it is then thrown off its high perch to the ground.

Gerald Scarfe's animated sequence is displayed during "The Trial". As the song reaches its steady climax and with the crowd shouting "Tear down the Wall", the wall crumbles violently from the top down amid smoke while a flurry of red paper confetti (in the shape of the bomb symbols from earlier in the show) drops onto the audience. The band emerges from behind the rubble and plays "Outside the Wall" with a variety of acoustic instruments. (At certain shows on the Australian leg, the band plays a complete acoustic version of "Waltzing Matilda" immediately after "Outside the Wall" as a rare encore. Similarly, at the shows in Mexico, the band performed "Las Mañanitas" to the tune of "Another Brick in the Wall") Waters introduces the band to the crowd, they bow and then exit the stage.

== Critical reception ==
Kevin Coffey of the Omaha World-Herald wrote:

Roger Waters and a cast of supporting musicians ... perform[ed] from start to finish one of the most commercially successful, beloved and ambitious art-rock albums in history ... as the show begins, the famous and enormous white wall is erected on stage, brick by brick, until it obscures the band and becomes a screen upon which a dazzling array of videos and visuals are projected. Technically, this was a nearly flawless show. The sound was clean and true. The original album and tour was about isolation. This time around, it was more anti-war, anti-capitalism and anti-poverty than about any kind of psychological issue. In addition to wild and slightly creepy animations from Gerald Scarfe, projections on the wall and video screens showed images of poverty, soldiers and others who died in conflicts as well as video of planes bombing areas with crosses, dollar signs, Shell Oil logos and others.

J.C. Maçek III of PopMatters wrote:

As an immersive concert experience, however, The Wall is an entirely different beast. Its harsh, theatrical nature pulls the audience deep into its storyline and its visuals create the illusion of actually being inside a dynamic, frightening and engrossing movie. Yes, The Wall live is every bit as cinematic as its actual cinema-released counterpart film Pink Floyd – The Wall and will remain a milestone in Pink Floyd and Roger Waters history. The Wall Live has truly been more than a concert tour, but an anti-war, pro-music, theatrical, cinematic, brilliant, inspiring truly immersive, multi-media experience that complements the history of The Wall and, perhaps, brings it one step farther in its story.

Steve Pick of Stltoday.com said:

"Roger Waters did not put on just an ordinary concert Friday night at the Scottrade Center — he created a huge, technologically complex and metaphorically dense theatrical spectacle."

Timothy Fin of the Kansas City Star has this to say about the show:

" ... Waters accordingly turned the performance into a[n] epic, gaudy and extravagant piece of theatre – an onslaught of sights, sounds and socio-political themes. Some of it was poignant, some of it was bombastic, some of it was viscerally thrilling, like a great rock show ought to be. But all of it was entertaining."

Kevin Stevens of The Setonian stated:

A hail of firework explosions, hundreds of large rectangular bricks, crashing planes, enormous puppets, 3D effects. Surely, this is not your average concert. Roger Waters' tour of his seminal album, "The Wall", lavishes in this Broadway-esque pomp, but never compromises its music for theatrics. This is a rock concert, one that succeeds in transforming Pink Floyd's brilliant 1979 opus into a compelling aesthetic and auditory experience.

A.D. Amorosi of the Philadelphia City Paper wrote:

"If epic paranoia over monster themes such as megalomania, mother fixation, loneliness, television, the warring industrial complex and the uselessness of fans and celebrity, accompanied by the sounds of unsettling bombast, is what you seek as entertainment, there's a bridge I can sell you. Or rather, a wall — The Wall, Roger Waters’ semi-autobiographical 1979 magnum opus ...

According to Matt DeMarco of The Hofstra Chronicle online:

Pyrotechnics were used throughout the show, as were massive marionette puppets, representative of several of the opera's supporting characters. The technological aspect of this show was astounding. Musically, the show was just as phenomenal. Waters brought an impressive touring band with him, including lead guitarist Dave Kilminster, who was just spectacular. The solo he delivered during "Comfortably Numb" was absolutely mind-blowing. Waters, himself, proved that rock ‘n roll has no age limit. At 67 years old, the rock icon played a flawless show, hitting notes that he was hitting 30 years ago. His energy was visibly present; he was truly excited to be performing this album for a live crowd again.

== Set list ==
The Wall album is played in its entirety and two songs not in the original release are included—"What Shall We Do Now?" and "The Last Few Bricks"—both of which were also played at every concert during The Wall Tour in 1980–1981, and documented on the album Is There Anybody Out There? The Wall Live 1980–81, released in 2000. "One of My Turns", "Don't Leave Me Now" and "Run Like Hell" are all transposed one key down to accommodate Waters' vocal range.

A change was made in the setlist from the Berlin 16 June 2011 show onwards, when Waters added an acoustic coda to "Another Brick in the Wall (Part 2)" with brand new lyrics referring to the murder of Jean Charles de Menezes. On later legs of the tour, the official tour program would list this as a separate song called "The Ballad of Jean Charles de Menezes". This is the first time ever a new song has been added to The Wall—all previous additions to the setlist of the original album either restored unused material (in The Wall film) or added existing songs from Waters' work (in The Wall – Live in Berlin).

Set one

1. "In the Flesh?"
2. "The Thin Ice"
3. "Another Brick in the Wall (Part 1)"
4. "The Happiest Days of Our Lives"
5. "Another Brick in the Wall (Part 2)"
6. "The Ballad of Jean Charles de Menezes" (June 2011 onwards)
7. "Mother"
8. "Goodbye Blue Sky"
9. "Empty Spaces"
10. "What Shall We Do Now?"
11. "Young Lust"
12. "One of My Turns"
13. "Don't Leave Me Now"
14. "Another Brick in the Wall (Part 3)"
15. "The Last Few Bricks"
16. "Goodbye Cruel World"

Set two

17. "Hey You"
18. "Is There Anybody Out There?"
19. "Nobody Home"
20. "Vera"
21. "Bring the Boys Back Home"
22. "Comfortably Numb"
23. "The Show Must Go On"
24. "In the Flesh"
25. "Run Like Hell"
26. "Waiting for the Worms"
27. "Stop"
28. "The Trial"
29. "Outside the Wall"

== Tour dates ==
Date	City	Country	Venue	Attendance	Revenue
North America (first leg)
15 September 2010	Toronto	Canada	Air Canada Centre	40,922 / 40,922	$5,623,300
16 September 2010	Toronto	Canada	Air Canada Centre	40,922 / 40,922	$5,623,300
18 September 2010	Toronto	Canada	Air Canada Centre	40,922 / 40,922	$5,623,300
20 September 2010	Chicago	United States	United Center	45,653 / 47,487	$5,400,900
21 September 2010	Chicago	United States	United Center	45,653 / 47,487	$5,400,900
23 September 2010	Chicago	United States	United Center	45,653 / 47,487	$5,400,900
24 September 2010	Chicago	United States	United Center	45,653 / 47,487	$5,400,900
26 September 2010	Pittsburgh	United States	Consol Energy Center	12,561 / 12,561	$1,316,224
28 September 2010	Cleveland	United States	Quicken Loans Arena	12,369 / 13,320	$1,229,950
30 September 2010	Boston	United States	TD Garden	34,120 / 34,626	$3,836,070
1 October 2010	Boston	United States	TD Garden	34,120 / 34,626	$3,836,070
3 October 2010	Boston	United States	TD Garden	34,120 / 34,626	$3,836,070
5 October 2010	New York City	United States	Madison Square Garden	36,704 / 36,704	$5,449,885
6 October 2010	New York City	United States	Madison Square Garden	36,704 / 36,704	$5,449,885
8 October 2010	Buffalo	United States	First Niagara Center	13,718 / 13,718	$1,493,334
10 October 2010	Washington, D.C.	United States	Verizon Center	12,865 / 12,865	$2,017,970
12 October 2010	Uniondale	United States	Nassau Veterans Memorial Coliseum	21,147 / 21,147	$2,365,175
13 October 2010	Uniondale	United States	Nassau Veterans Memorial Coliseum	21,147 / 21,147	$2,365,175
15 October 2010	Hartford	United States	XL Center	11,647 / 11,647	$1,534,942
17 October 2010	Ottawa	Canada	Scotiabank Place	12,699 / 12,699	$1,346,000
19 October 2010	Montreal	Canada	Bell Centre	27,210 / 27,210	$3,482,540
20 October 2010	Montreal	Canada	Bell Centre	27,210 / 27,210	$3,482,540
22 October 2010	Columbus	United States	Value City Arena	12,010 / 12,010	$1,325,804
24 October 2010	Auburn Hills	United States	The Palace of Auburn Hills	13,481 / 13,481	$1,536,384
26 October 2010	Omaha	United States	Qwest Center Omaha	9,471 / 9,897	$898,513
27 October 2010	Saint Paul	United States	Xcel Energy Center	14,130 / 14,130	$1,704,884
29 October 2010	St. Louis	United States	Scottrade Center	12,574 / 12,574	$1,341,058
30 October 2010	Kansas City	United States	Sprint Center	11,458 / 11,458	$1,253,051
3 November 2010	East Rutherford	United States	Izod Center	25,690 / 25,690	$3,385,970
4 November 2010	East Rutherford	United States	Izod Center	25,690 / 25,690	$3,385,970
6 November 2010	New York City	United States	Madison Square Garden	12,498 / 12,498	$1,902,115
8 November 2010	Philadelphia	United States	Wells Fargo Center	39,280 / 39,280	$5,474,340
9 November 2010	Philadelphia	United States	Wells Fargo Center	39,280 / 39,280	$5,474,340
11 November 2010	Philadelphia	United States	Wells Fargo Center	39,280 / 39,280	$5,474,340
13 November 2010	Sunrise	United States	BankAtlantic Center	24,939 / 24,939	$2,956,233
14 November 2010	Sunrise	United States	BankAtlantic Center	24,939 / 24,939	$2,956,233
16 November 2010	Tampa	United States	St. Pete Times Forum	14,630 / 15,650	$1,784,297
18 November 2010	Atlanta	United States	Philips Arena	12,665 / 12,665	$1,772,797
20 November 2010	Houston	United States	Toyota Center	11,443 / 11,443	$1,541,128
21 November 2010	Dallas	United States	American Airlines Center	12,804 / 12,804	$1,673,754
23 November 2010	Denver	United States	Pepsi Center	11,801 / 11,801	$1,491,145
26 November 2010	Paradise	United States	MGM Grand Garden Arena	12,661 / 12,661	$1,992,350
27 November 2010	Phoenix	United States	US Airways Center	12,234 / 12,234	$1,428,183
29 November 2010	Los Angeles	United States	Staples Center	36,621 / 36,621	$5,408,750
30 November 2010	Los Angeles	United States	Staples Center	36,621 / 36,621	$5,408,750
3 December 2010	Oakland	United States	Oracle Arena	12,579 / 12,579	$1,536,895
5 December 2010	Los Angeles	United States	Staples Center	—N/a	—N/a
7 December 2010	San Jose	United States	HP Pavilion at San Jose	23,209 / 23,209	$3,106,707
8 December 2010	San Jose	United States	HP Pavilion at San Jose	23,209 / 23,209	$3,106,707
10 December 2010	Vancouver	Canada	Rogers Arena	13,159 / 13,159	$1,940,070
11 December 2010	Tacoma	United States	Tacoma Dome	19,785 / 19,785	$2,194,338
13 December 2010	Anaheim	United States	Honda Center	23,854 / 23,854	$3,321,700
14 December 2010	Anaheim	United States	Honda Center	23,854 / 23,854	$3,321,700
18 December 2010	Mexico City	Mexico	Palacio de los Deportes	42,864 / 42,864	$4,788,270
19 December 2010	Mexico City	Mexico	Palacio de los Deportes	42,864 / 42,864	$4,788,270
21 December 2010	Mexico City	Mexico	Palacio de los Deportes	42,864 / 42,864	$4,788,270
Europe (first leg)
21 March 2011	Lisbon	Portugal	Pavilhão Atlântico	31,170 / 31,170	$2,593,376
22 March 2011	Lisbon	Portugal	Pavilhão Atlântico	31,170 / 31,170	$2,593,376
25 March 2011	Madrid	Spain	Palacio de Deportes de la Comunidad de Madrid	29,338 / 29,338	$2,135,012
26 March 2011	Madrid	Spain	Palacio de Deportes de la Comunidad de Madrid	29,338 / 29,338	$2,135,012
29 March 2011	Barcelona	Spain	Palau Sant Jordi	28,738 / 28,738	$2,079,519
30 March 2011	Barcelona	Spain	Palau Sant Jordi	28,738 / 28,738	$2,079,519
1 April 2011	Milan	Italy	Mediolanum Forum	38,513 / 38,513	$3,888,218
2 April 2011	Milan	Italy	Mediolanum Forum	38,513 / 38,513	$3,888,218
4 April 2011	Milan	Italy	Mediolanum Forum	38,513 / 38,513	$3,888,218
5 April 2011	Milan	Italy	Mediolanum Forum	38,513 / 38,513	$3,888,218
8 April 2011	Arnhem	Netherlands	GelreDome	88,693 / 88,693	$8,632,039
9 April 2011	Arnhem	Netherlands	GelreDome	88,693 / 88,693	$8,632,039
11 April 2011	Arnhem	Netherlands	GelreDome	88,693 / 88,693	$8,632,039
13 April 2011	Zagreb	Croatia	Arena Zagreb	17,004 / 17,004	$1,122,965
15 April 2011	Prague	Czech Republic	O_{2} Arena	29,095 / 29,095	$3,495,960
16 April 2011	Prague	Czech Republic	O_{2} Arena	29,095 / 29,095	$3,495,960
18 April 2011	Łódź	Poland	Atlas Arena	26,231 / 26,231	$2,248,310
19 April 2011	Łódź	Poland	Atlas Arena	26,231 / 26,231	$2,248,310
23 April 2011	Moscow	Russia	SK Olimpiyskiy	21,894 / 21,894	$1,904,778
25 April 2011	Saint Petersburg	Russia	SKK Peterburgskiy	15,998 / 15,998	$1,542,045
27 April 2011	Helsinki	Finland	Hartwall Areena	20,583 / 20,583	$2,291,537
28 April 2011	Helsinki	Finland	Hartwall Areena	20,583 / 20,583	$2,291,537
30 April 2011	Bærum	Norway	Telenor Arena	36,034 / 36,034	$5,597,370
1 May 2011	Bærum	Norway	Telenor Arena	36,034 / 36,034	$5,597,370
4 May 2011	Stockholm	Sweden	Ericsson Globe	23,212 / 23,212	$3,127,365
5 May 2011	Stockholm	Sweden	Ericsson Globe	23,212 / 23,212	$3,127,365
7 May 2011	Copenhagen	Denmark	Parken Stadion	46,825 / 46,825	$5,151,114
11 May 2011	London	England	The O_{2} Arena	89,182 / 90,006	$10,232,800
12 May 2011	London	England	The O_{2} Arena	89,182 / 90,006	$10,232,800
14 May 2011	London	England	The O_{2} Arena	89,182 / 90,006	$10,232,800
15 May 2011	London	England	The O_{2} Arena	89,182 / 90,006	$10,232,800
17 May 2011	London	England	The O_{2} Arena	89,182 / 90,006	$10,232,800
18 May 2011	London	England	The O_{2} Arena	89,182 / 90,006	$10,232,800
20 May 2011	Manchester	England	Manchester Evening News Arena	36,817 / 37,050	$4,428,190
21 May 2011	Manchester	England	Manchester Evening News Arena	36,817 / 37,050	$4,428,190
23 May 2011	Dublin	Ireland	The O_{2}	24,540 / 24,540	$2,370,038
24 May 2011	Dublin	Ireland	The O_{2}	24,540 / 24,540	$2,370,038
27 May 2011	Antwerp	Belgium	Sportpaleis	24,977 / 24,977	$2,703,230
28 May 2011	Antwerp	Belgium	Sportpaleis	24,977 / 24,977	$2,703,230
30 May 2011	Paris	France	Palais Omnisports de Paris-Bercy	56,764 / 56,764	$6,015,980
31 May 2011	Paris	France	Palais Omnisports de Paris-Bercy	56,764 / 56,764	$6,015,980
3 June 2011	Mannheim	Germany	SAP Arena	16,444 / 16,444	$2,226,201
4 June 2011	Mannheim	Germany	SAP Arena	16,444 / 16,444	$2,226,201
6 June 2011	Zürich	Switzerland	Hallenstadion	39,811 / 39,811	$9,633,656
7 June 2011	Zürich	Switzerland	Hallenstadion	39,811 / 39,811	$9,633,656
10 June 2011	Hamburg	Germany	O_{2} World Hamburg	19,839 / 19,839	$2,605,683
11 June 2011	Hamburg	Germany	O_{2} World Hamburg	19,839 / 19,839	$2,605,683
13 June 2011	Herning	Denmark	Jyske Bank Boxen	13,564 / 13,564	$1,595,402
15 June 2011	Berlin	Germany	O_{2} World Berlin	21,961 / 21,961	$2,734,176
16 June 2011	Berlin	Germany	O_{2} World Berlin	21,961 / 21,961	$2,734,176
18 June 2011	Düsseldorf	Germany	Esprit Arena	35,000 / 35,000	$3,784,690
20 June 2011	Munich	Germany	Olympiahalle	9,888 / 9,888	$1,343,821
22 June 2011	Budapest	Hungary	Papp László Budapest Sportaréna	13,445 / 13,445	$1,333,913
24 June 2011	Zürich	Switzerland	Hallenstadion	—N/a	—N/a
25 June 2011	Zürich	Switzerland	Hallenstadion	—N/a	—N/a
27 June 2011	Birmingham	England	National Indoor Arena	9,326 / 9,326	$1,142,757
28 June 2011	Manchester	England	Manchester Evening News Arena	—N/a	—N/a
30 June 2011	Paris	France	Palais Omnisports de Paris-Bercy	—N/a	—N/a
1 July 2011	Paris	France	Palais Omnisports de Paris-Bercy	—N/a	—N/a
3 July 2011	Milan	Italy	Mediolanum Forum	21,005 / 21,005	$1,335,100
4 July 2011	Milan	Italy	Mediolanum Forum	21,005 / 21,005	$1,335,100
8 July 2011	Athens	Greece	OAKA Olympiakó Kleistó Gymnastírio	35,005 / 35,005	$2,559,048
9 July 2011	Athens	Greece	OAKA Olympiakó Kleistó Gymnastírio	35,005 / 35,005	$2,559,048
12 July 2011	Athens	Greece	OAKA Olympiakó Kleistó Gymnastírio	35,005 / 35,005	$2,559,048
Oceania
27 January 2012	Perth	Australia	Burswood Dome	19,523 / 19,523	$3,637,000
28 January 2012	Perth	Australia	Burswood Dome	19,523 / 19,523	$3,637,000
1 February 2012	Brisbane	Australia	Brisbane Entertainment Centre	25,359 / 25,359	$4,268,040
2 February 2012	Brisbane	Australia	Brisbane Entertainment Centre	25,359 / 25,359	$4,268,040
4 February 2012	Brisbane	Australia	Brisbane Entertainment Centre	25,359 / 25,359	$4,268,040
7 February 2012	Melbourne	Australia	Rod Laver Arena	38,586 / 38,586	$6,900,750
8 February 2012	Melbourne	Australia	Rod Laver Arena	38,586 / 38,586	$6,900,750
10 February 2012	Melbourne	Australia	Rod Laver Arena	38,586 / 38,586	$6,900,750
11 February 2012	Melbourne	Australia	Rod Laver Arena	38,586 / 38,586	$6,900,750
14 February 2012	Sydney	Australia	Allphones Arena	22,994 / 22,994	$4,314,050
15 February 2012	Sydney	Australia	Allphones Arena	22,994 / 22,994	$4,314,050
18 February 2012	Auckland	New Zealand	Vector Arena	39,096 / 39,096	$6,149,610
20 February 2012	Auckland	New Zealand	Vector Arena	39,096 / 39,096	$6,149,610
22 February 2012	Auckland	New Zealand	Vector Arena	39,096 / 39,096	$6,149,610
23 February 2012	Auckland	New Zealand	Vector Arena	39,096 / 39,096	$6,149,610
South America
2 March 2012	Santiago	Chile	Estadio Nacional Julio Martínez Prádanos	93,926 / 94,875	$9,297,778
3 March 2012	Santiago	Chile	Estadio Nacional Julio Martínez Prádanos	93,926 / 94,875	$9,297,778
7 March 2012	Buenos Aires	Argentina	Estadio Monumental Antonio Vespucio Liberti	430,678 / 444,906	$37,970,877
9 March 2012	Buenos Aires	Argentina	Estadio Monumental Antonio Vespucio Liberti	430,678 / 444,906	$37,970,877
10 March 2012	Buenos Aires	Argentina	Estadio Monumental Antonio Vespucio Liberti	430,678 / 444,906	$37,970,877
12 March 2012	Buenos Aires	Argentina	Estadio Monumental Antonio Vespucio Liberti	430,678 / 444,906	$37,970,877
14 March 2012	Buenos Aires	Argentina	Estadio Monumental Antonio Vespucio Liberti	430,678 / 444,906	$37,970,877
15 March 2012	Buenos Aires	Argentina	Estadio Monumental Antonio Vespucio Liberti	430,678 / 444,906	$37,970,877
17 March 2012	Buenos Aires	Argentina	Estadio Monumental Antonio Vespucio Liberti	430,678 / 444,906	$37,970,877
18 March 2012	Buenos Aires	Argentina	Estadio Monumental Antonio Vespucio Liberti	430,678 / 444,906	$37,970,877
20 March 2012	Buenos Aires	Argentina	Estadio Monumental Antonio Vespucio Liberti	430,678 / 444,906	$37,970,877
25 March 2012	Porto Alegre	Brazil	Estádio Beira-Rio	42,436 / 46,671	$5,950,540
29 March 2012	Rio de Janeiro	Brazil	Estádio Olímpico João Havelange	43,046 / 53,219	$4,839,180
1 April 2012	São Paulo	Brazil	Estádio do Morumbi	99,869 / 107,621	$12,512,600
3 April 2012	São Paulo	Brazil	Estádio do Morumbi	99,869 / 107,621	$12,512,600
North America (second leg)
27 April 2012	Mexico City	Mexico	Foro Sol	82,811 / 82,811	$7,596,861
28 April 2012	Mexico City	Mexico	Foro Sol	82,811 / 82,811	$7,596,861
1 May 2012	Houston	United States	Toyota Center	11,264 / 11,264	$1,365,855
3 May 2012	Austin	United States	Frank Erwin Center	10,230 / 10,230	$1,188,971
5 May 2012	Tulsa	United States	BOK Center	10,651 / 10,651	$1,198,062
7 May 2012	Denver	United States	Pepsi Center	11,800 / 11,800	$1,443,249
11 May 2012	San Francisco	United States	AT&T Park	33,193 / 33,193	$4,151,511
13 May 2012	San Diego	United States	Valley View Casino Center	10,219 / 10,219	$1,323,031
15 May 2012	Phoenix	United States	US Airways Center	11,585 / 11,585	$1,255,271
19 May 2012	Los Angeles	United States	Los Angeles Memorial Coliseum	45,751 / 45,751	$3,544,731
22 May 2012	Portland	United States	Rose Garden	12,275 / 12,275	$1,316,751
24 May 2012	Seattle	United States	KeyArena	12,006 / 12,006	$1,481,010
26 May 2012	Vancouver	Canada	BC Place	36,013 / 36,013	$3,820,182
28 May 2012	Edmonton	Canada	Rexall Place	24,419 / 24,419	$3,085,732
29 May 2012	Edmonton	Canada	Rexall Place	24,419 / 24,419	$3,085,732
31 May 2012	Winnipeg	Canada	MTS Centre	20,754 / 20,754	$2,384,855
1 June 2012	Winnipeg	Canada	MTS Centre	20,754 / 20,754	$2,384,855
3 June 2012	Saint Paul	United States	Xcel Energy Center	12,889 / 12,889	$1,420,771
5 June 2012	Detroit	United States	Joe Louis Arena	11,406 / 11,406	$1,222,904
6 June 2012	Grand Rapids	United States	Van Andel Arena	9,388 / 9,388	$1,042,274
8 June 2012	Chicago	United States	Wrigley Field	36,881 / 36,881	$4,388,860
10 June 2012	Louisville	United States	KFC Yum! Center	12,547 / 14,666	$1,295,669
11 June 2012	Indianapolis	United States	Bankers Life Fieldhouse	11,248 / 11,248	$1,288,131
13 June 2012	Atlanta	United States	Philips Arena	10,707 / 10,707	$1,256,465
15 June 2012	Sunrise	United States	BankAtlantic Center	12,299 / 12,299	$1,522,098
16 June 2012	Orlando	United States	Amway Center	11,878 / 11,878	$1,383,781
19 June 2012	Nashville	United States	Bridgestone Arena	12,748 / 12,748	$1,356,251
21 June 2012	Buffalo	United States	First Niagara Center	12,996 / 12,996	$1,327,184
23 June 2012	Toronto	Canada	Rogers Centre	40,328 / 40,328	$3,876,736
25 June 2012	Ottawa	Canada	Scotiabank Place	11,604 / 11,604	$1,239,283
26 June 2012	Montreal	Canada	Bell Centre	14,305 / 14,305	$1,740,898
28 June 2012	Albany	United States	Times Union Center	10,963 / 10,963	$1,155,427
29 June 2012	Hartford	United States	XL Center	11,225 / 11,225	$1,421,495
1 July 2012	Boston	United States	Fenway Park	27,847 / 27,847	$3,620,675
3 July 2012	Pittsburgh	United States	Consol Energy Center	12,488 / 12,488	$1,269,078
6 July 2012	New York City	United States	Yankee Stadium	62,188 / 62,188	$7,375,030
7 July 2012	New York City	United States	Yankee Stadium	62,188 / 62,188	$7,375,030
9 July 2012	Raleigh	United States	PNC Arena	11,913 / 11,913	$1,259,326
10 July 2012	Charlotte	United States	Time Warner Cable Arena	12,540 / 12,540	$1,256,734
12 July 2012	Washington, D.C.	United States	Verizon Center	12,901 / 12,901	$1,683,729
14 July 2012	Philadelphia	United States	Citizens Bank Park	36,773 / 36,773	$4,270,942
21 July 2012	Quebec City	Canada	Plains of Abraham	71,021 / 75,000	$7,391,936
Europe (second leg)
18 July 2013	Arnhem	Netherlands	GelreDome	6,343 / 10,000	$610,369
20 July 2013	Werchter	Belgium	Werchter festival ground	35,881 / 40,000	$3,344,159
23 July 2013	Split	Croatia	Stadion Poljud	19,338 / 25,000	$770,476
26 July 2013	Padua	Italy	Stadio Euganeo	41,358 / 42,000	$3,624,011
28 July 2013	Rome	Italy	Stadio Olimpico	50,848 / 52,000	$4,257,575
31 July 2013	Athens	Greece	Olympic Stadium	25,807 / 77,000	$1,453,804
4 August 2013	Istanbul	Turkey	İTÜ Stadyumu	25,438 / 30,000	$2,767,959
7 August 2013	Prague	Czech Republic	O2 Arena	13,621 / 14,200	$1,666,798
9 August 2013	Frankfurt	Germany	Commerzbank-Arena	26,422 / 29,000	$3,292,846
11 August 2013	Copenhagen	Denmark	Parken Stadion	35,575 / 40,200	$4,057,727
14 August 2013	Bærum	Norway	Telenor Arena	33,324 / 35,000	$4,630,713
15 August 2013	Bærum	Norway	Telenor Arena	33,324 / 35,000	$4,630,713
17 August 2013	Gothenburg	Sweden	Ullevi Stadion	30,766 / 35,000	$3,177,530
20 August 2013	Warsaw	Poland	Stadion Narodowy im. Kazimierza Górskiego	32,549 / 36,331	$3,008,068
23 August 2013	Vienna	Austria	Ernst-Happel-Stadion	36,385 / 40,000	$4,409,931
25 August 2013	Budapest	Hungary	Puskás Ferenc Stadion	18,720 / 30,000	$1,137,675
28 August 2013	Bucharest	Romania	Piaţa Constituţiei	44,813 / 44,850	$3,216,105
30 August 2013	Sofia	Bulgaria	Vassil Levski National Stadium	31,371 / 35,000	$2,053,674
1 September 2013	Belgrade	Serbia	Kombank Arena	12,400 / 14,000	$669,712
4 September 2013	Berlin	Germany	Olympiastadion Berlin	29,857 / 40,000	$3,299,137
6 September 2013	Düsseldorf	Germany	Esprit Arena	33,727 / 35,000	$3,823,373
8 September 2013	Amsterdam	Netherlands	Amsterdam ArenA	47,414 / 47,500	$4,257,133
11 September 2013	Zurich	Switzerland	Letzigrund	37,367 / 40,000	$4,974,579
14 September 2013	London	England	Wembley Stadium	57,803 / 58,000	$6,385,728
16 September 2013	Manchester	England	Manchester Arena	9,667 / 12,000	$1,119,528
18 September 2013	Dublin	Ireland	Aviva Stadium	24,210 / 30,000	$2,443,706
21 September 2013	Paris (Saint-Denis)	France	Stade de France	69,119 / 70,000	$6,853,334
TOTAL				4,129,863 / 4,268,028 (97%)	$458,673,798

== Image gallery ==
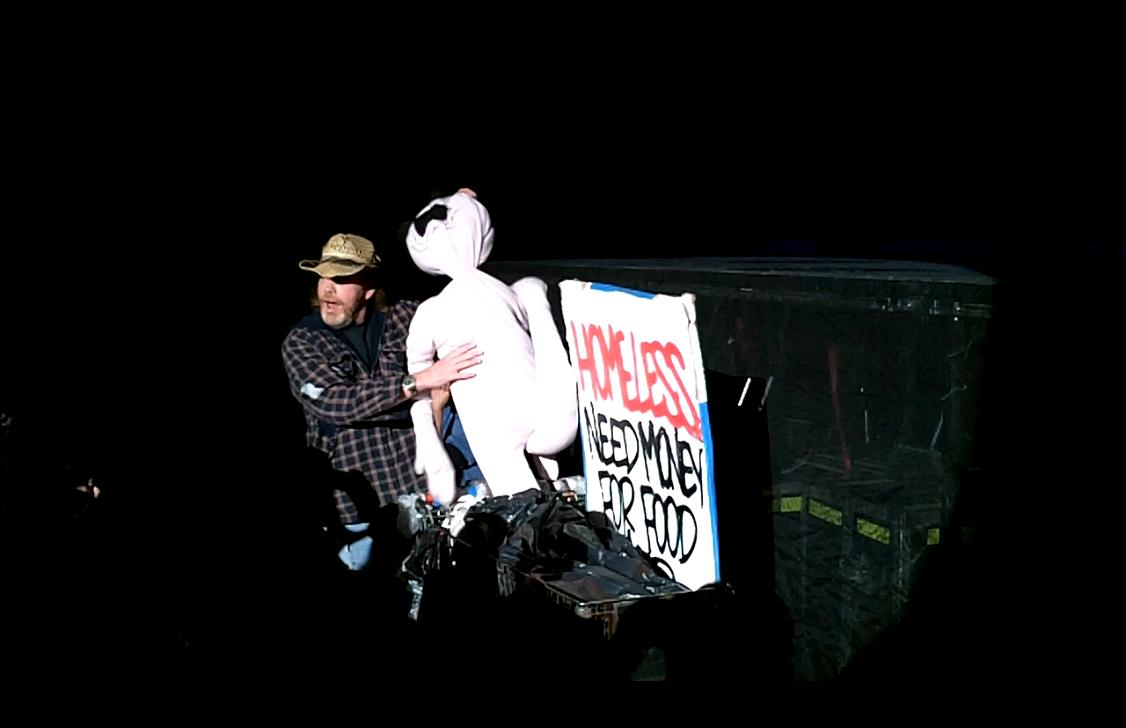
The "homeless guy" before the show in Denver, 23 November 2010.

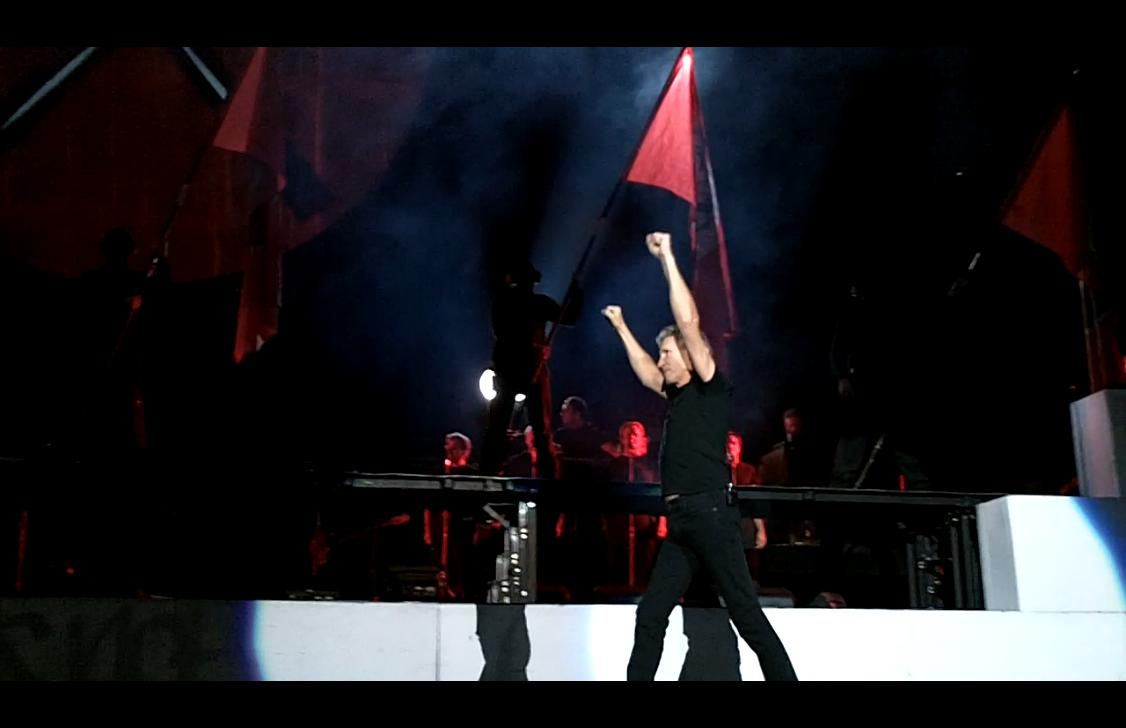
Waters during in the Flesh?

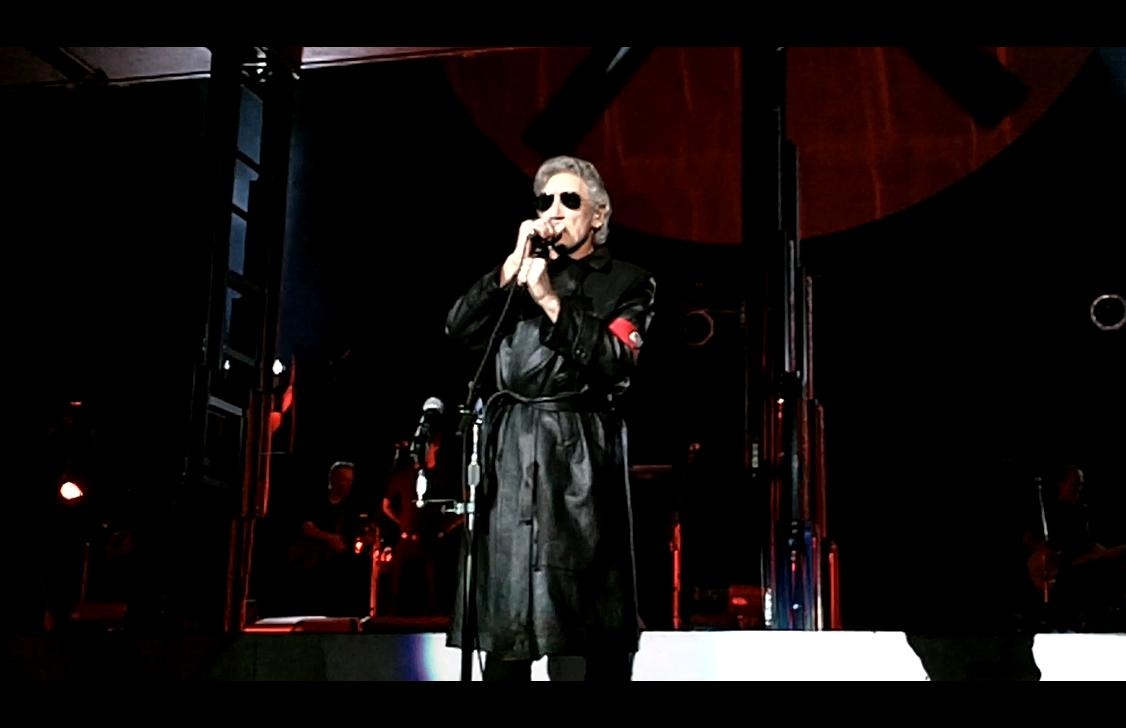
In the Flesh?

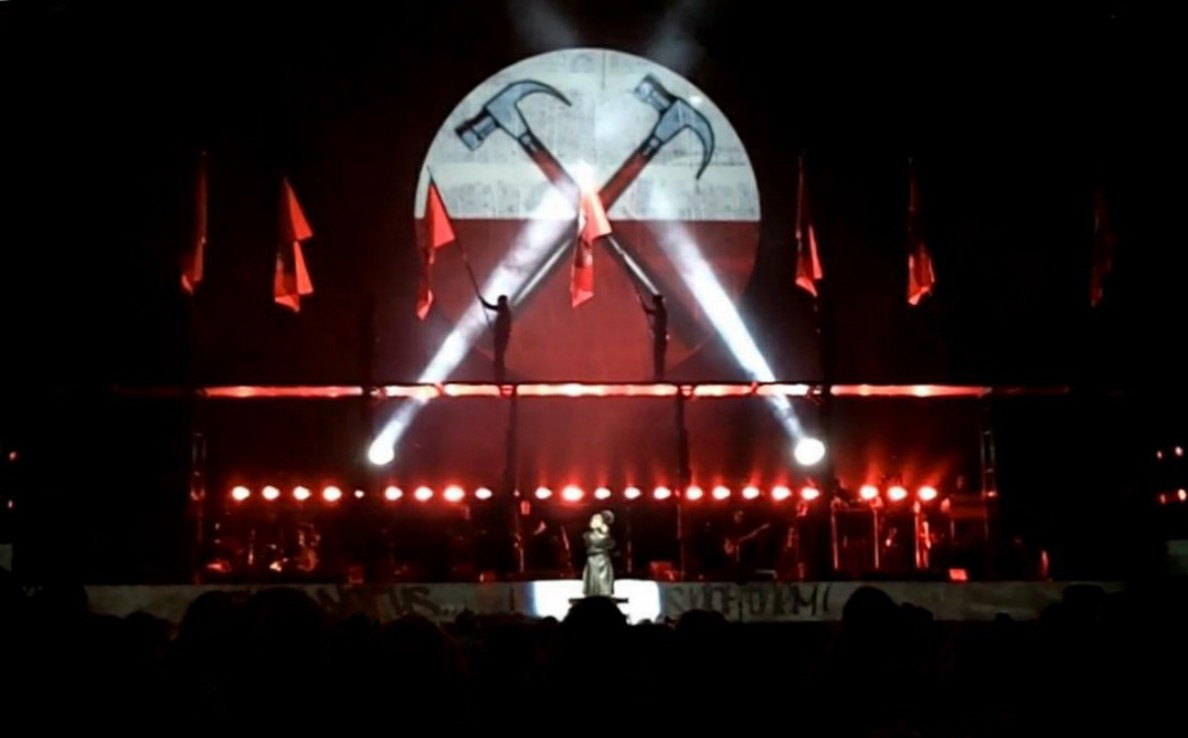
Waters performing "In the Flesh?".

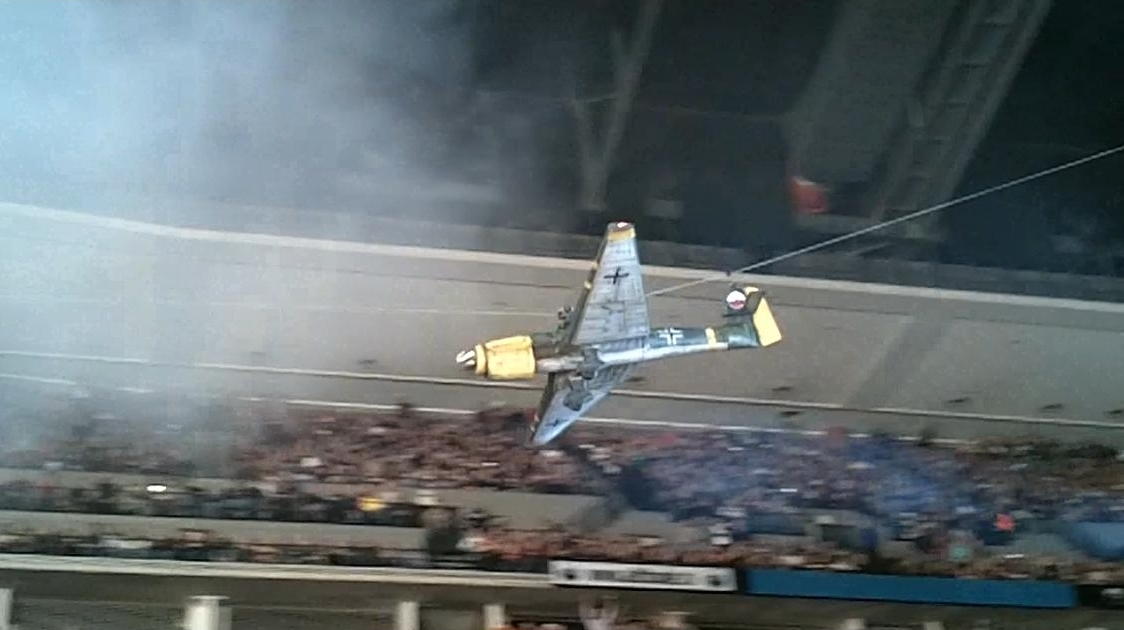
The Stuka diving at the conclusion of "In The Flesh?"

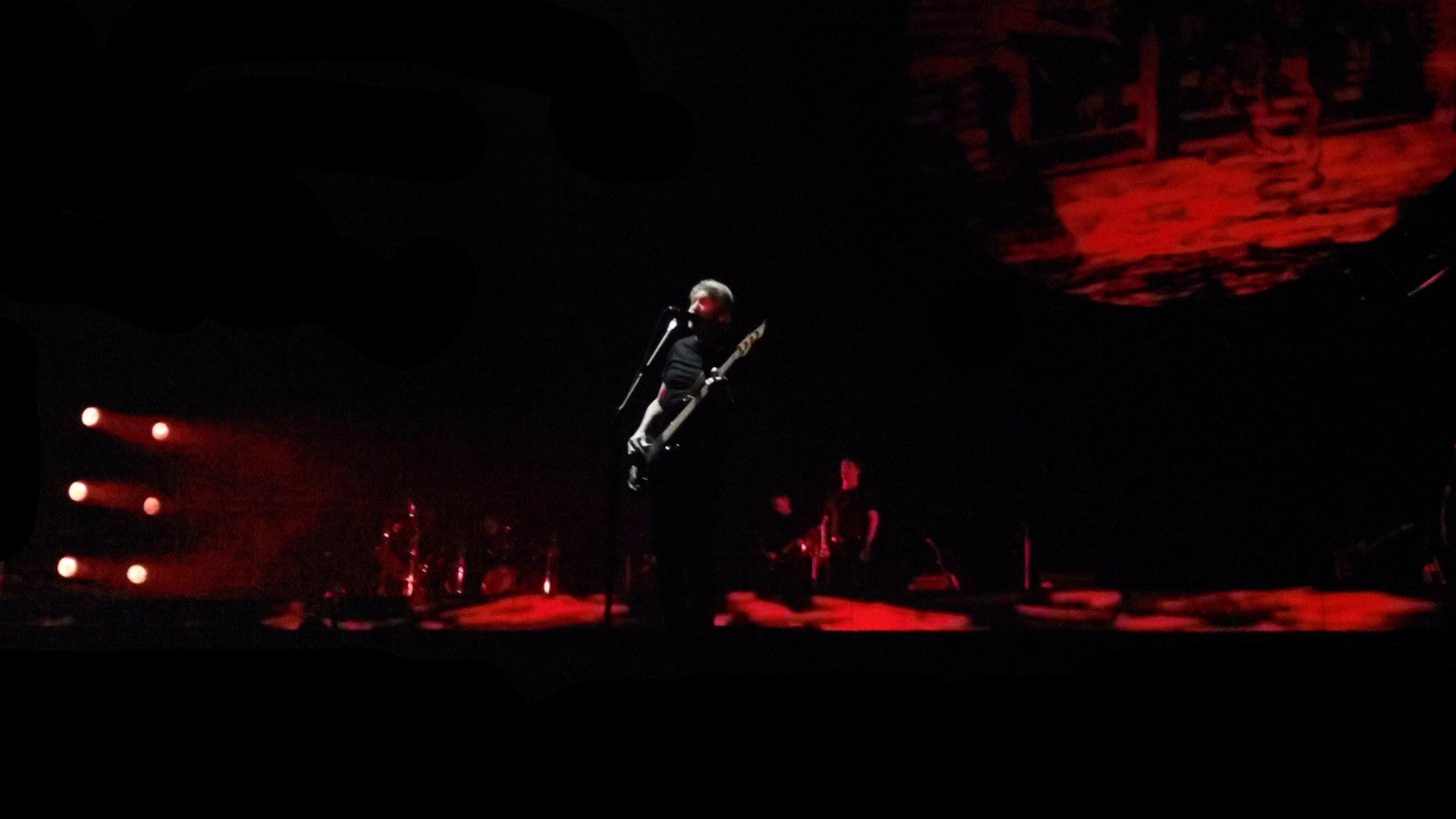
Performing "Another Brick in the Wall I"

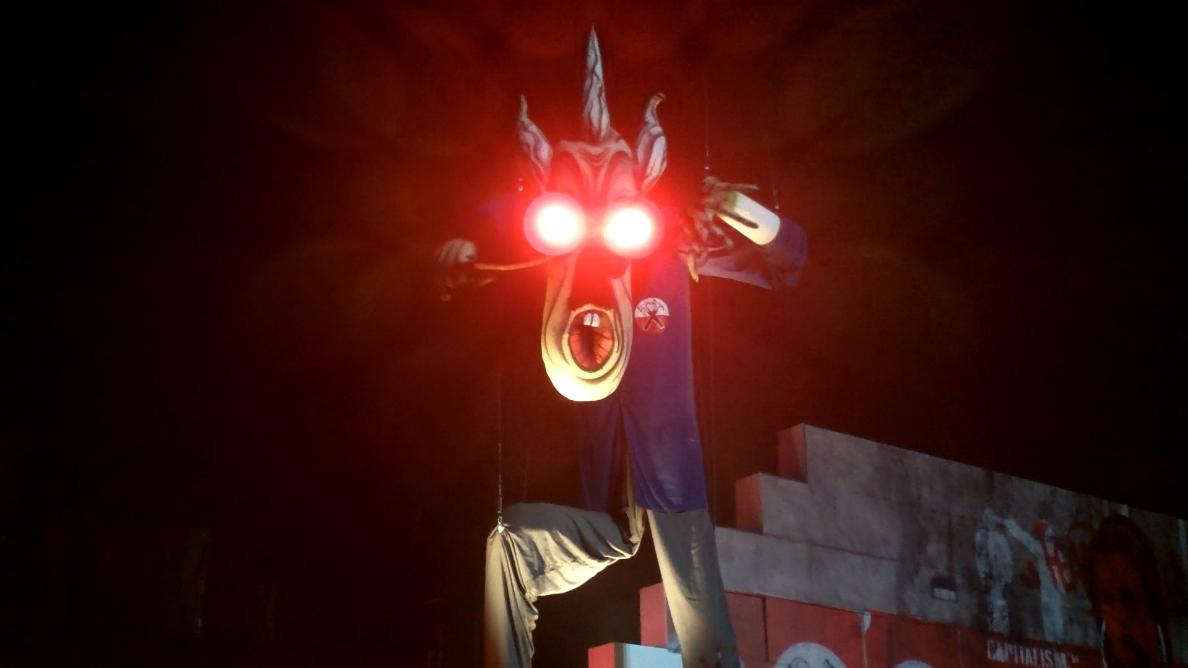
The "Schoolmaster" puppet during "Another Brick in The Wall II".

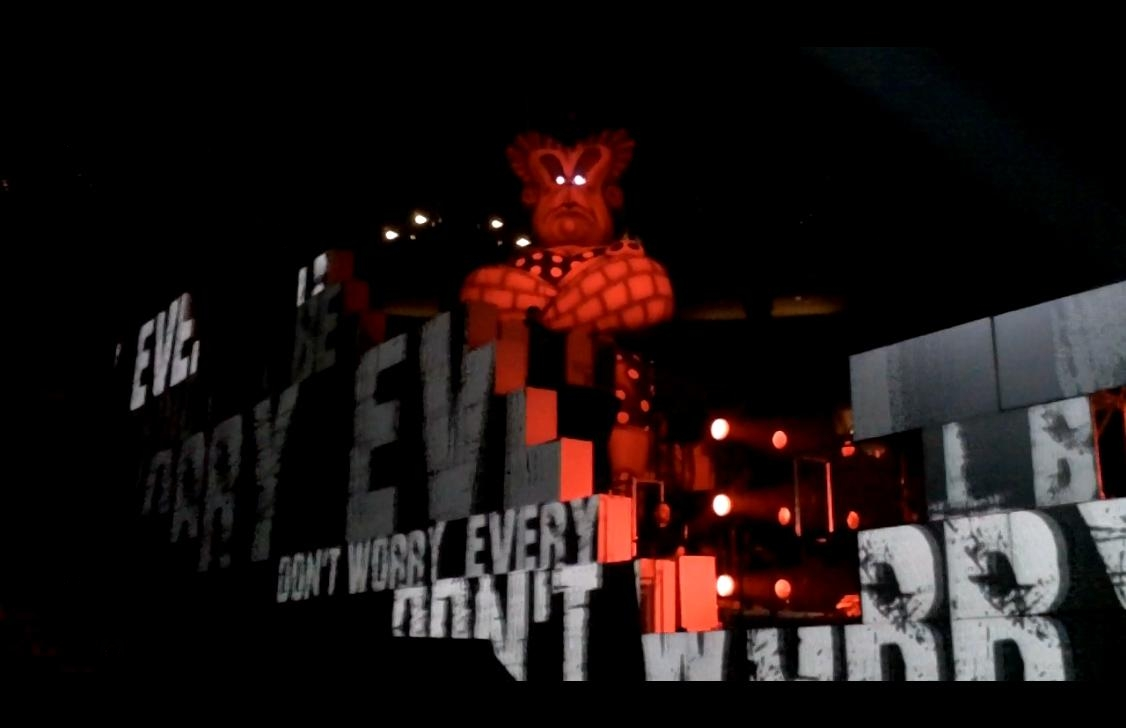
"Mother" looms large over a 12-meter wall.

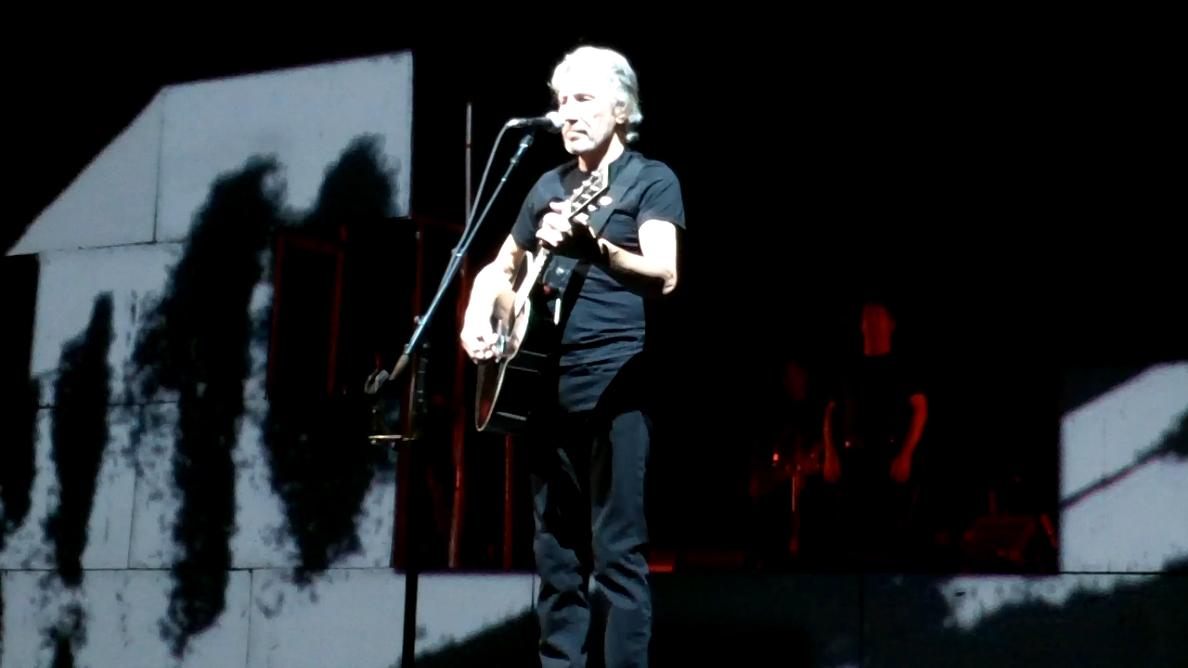
Playing an acoustic guitar during "Mother"

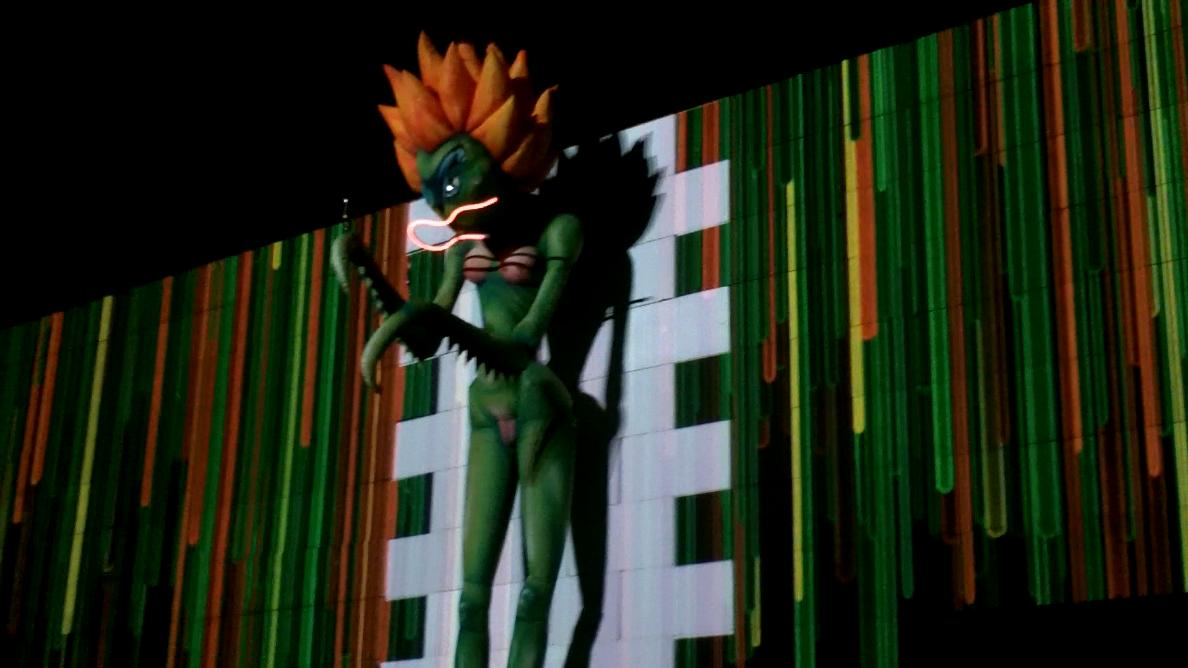
The "ex-wife" puppet during "Don't Leave Me Now"

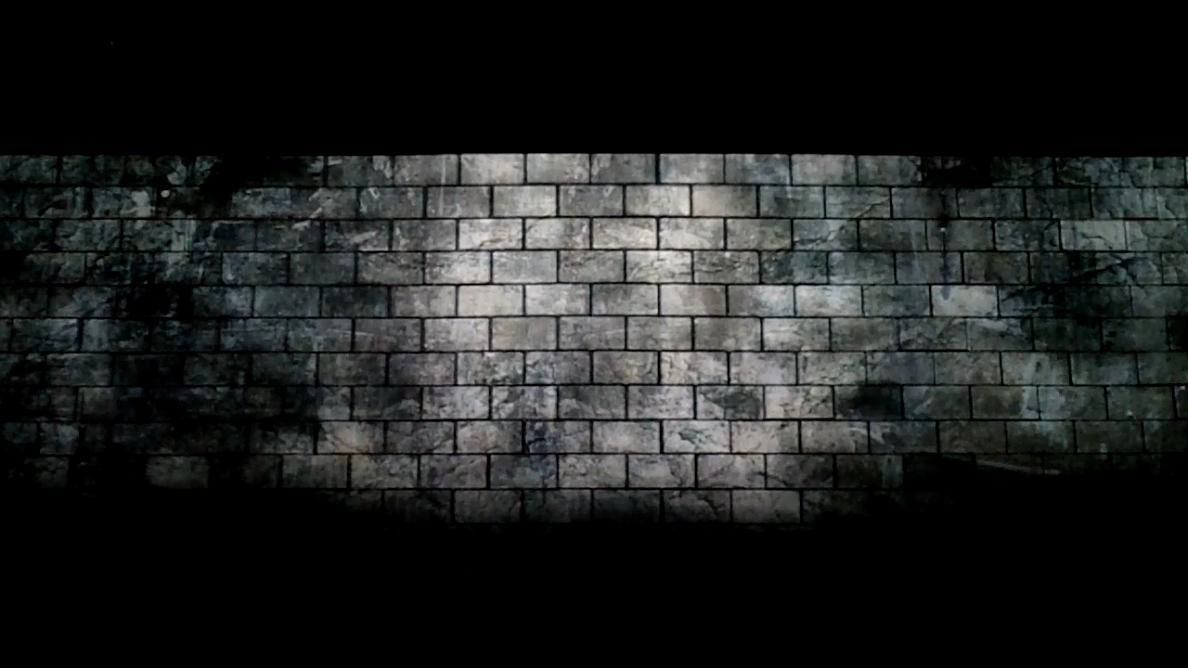
The Wall is complete, during "Hey You"

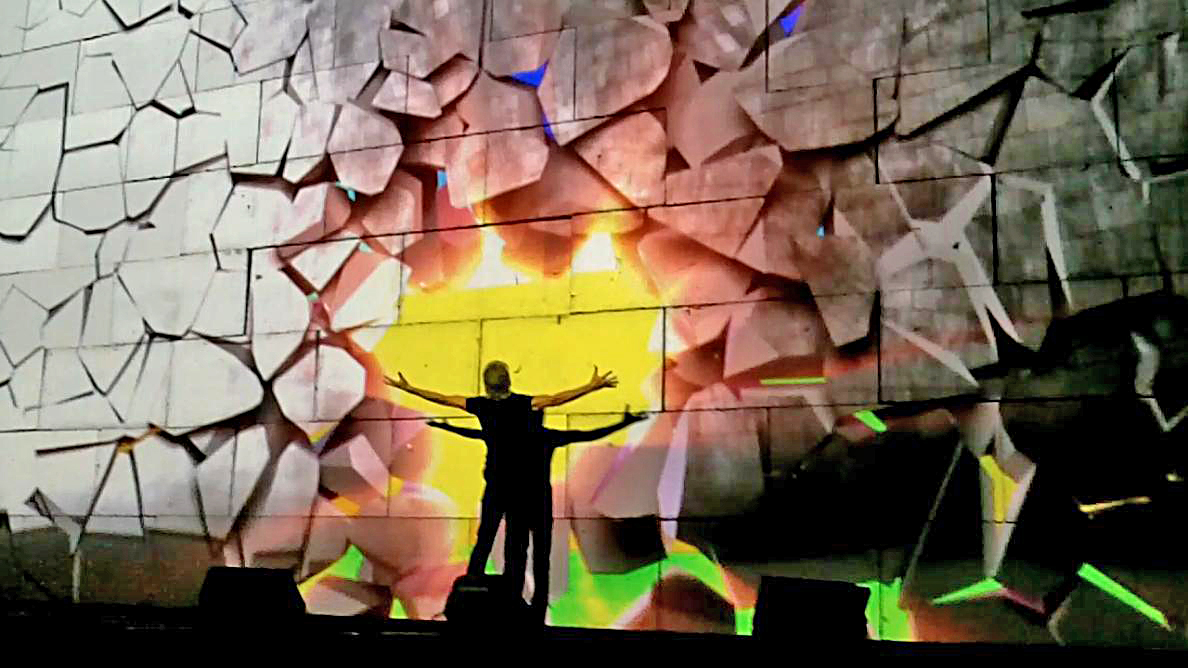
During the climax of the guitar solo in "Comfortably Numb"

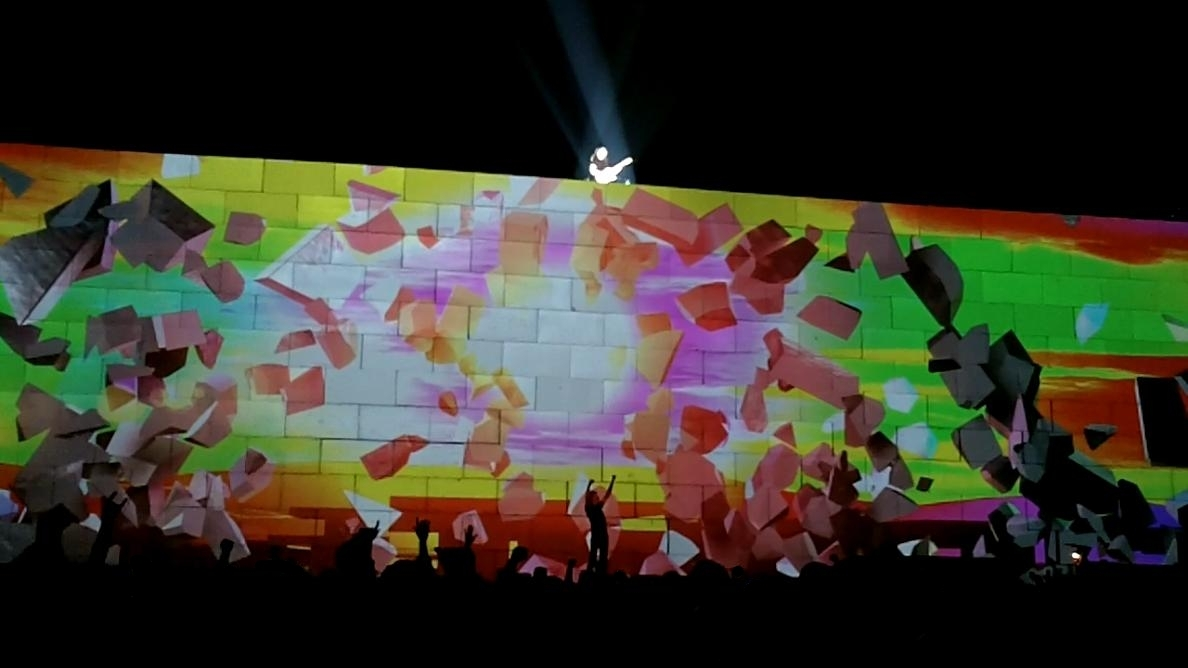
During the guitar solo to "Comfortably Numb"

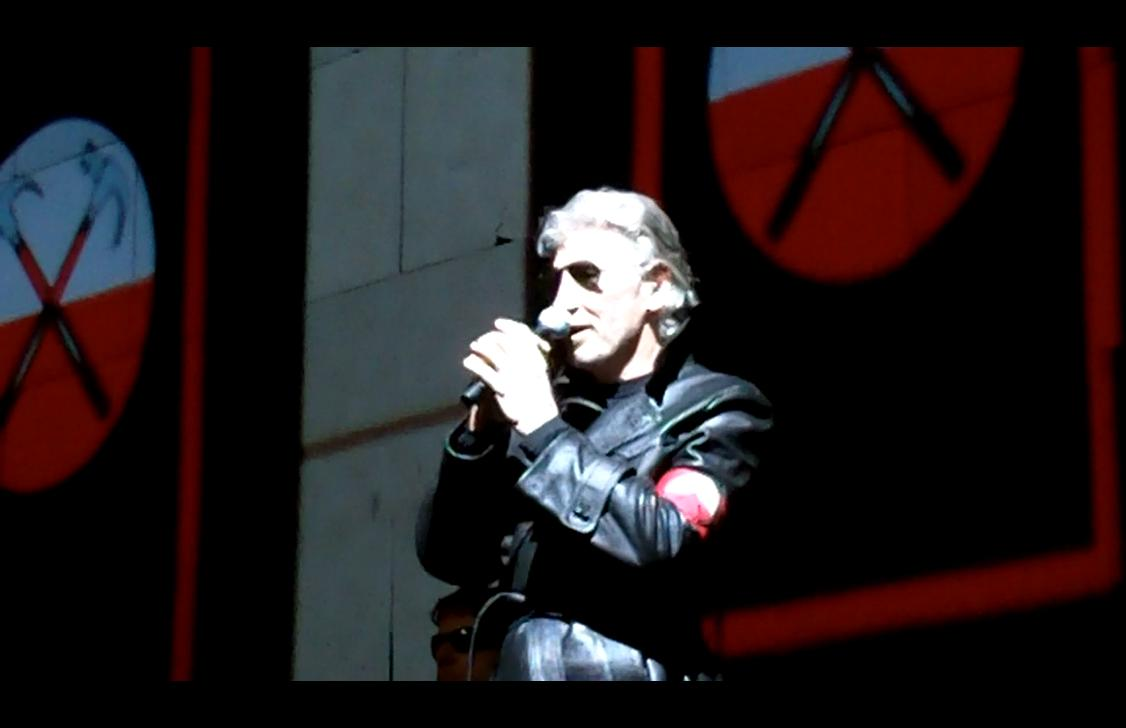
In the Flesh

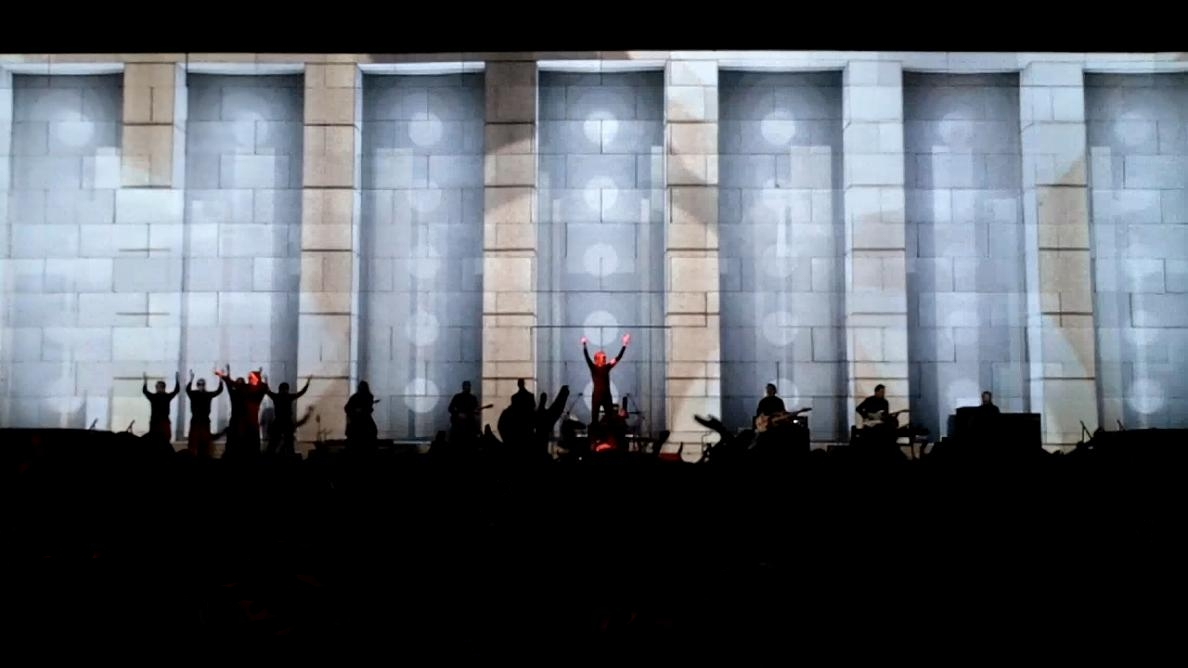
Performing "Run Like Hell"

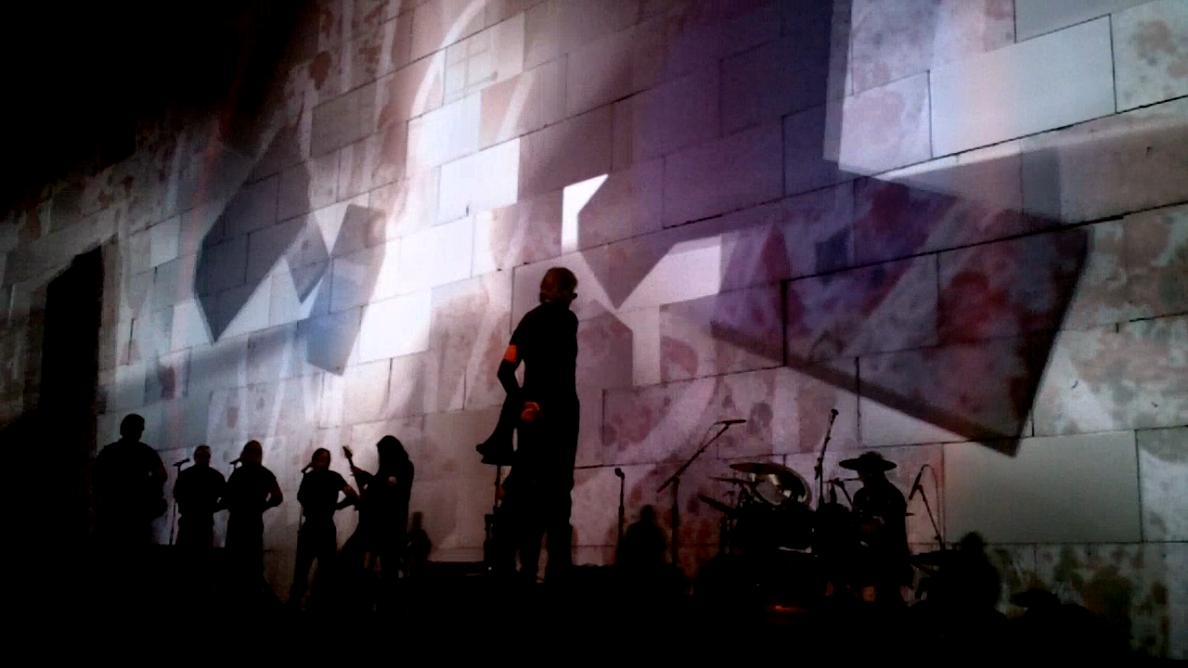
During the extended "Run Like Hell"

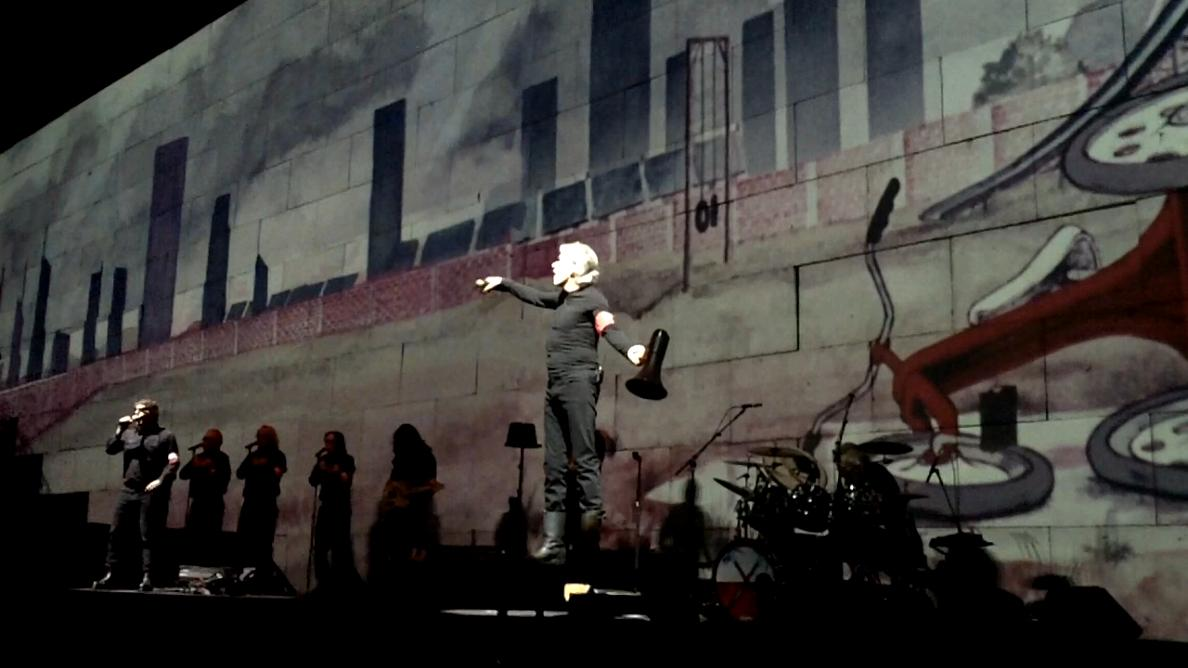
"Waiting for the Worms"

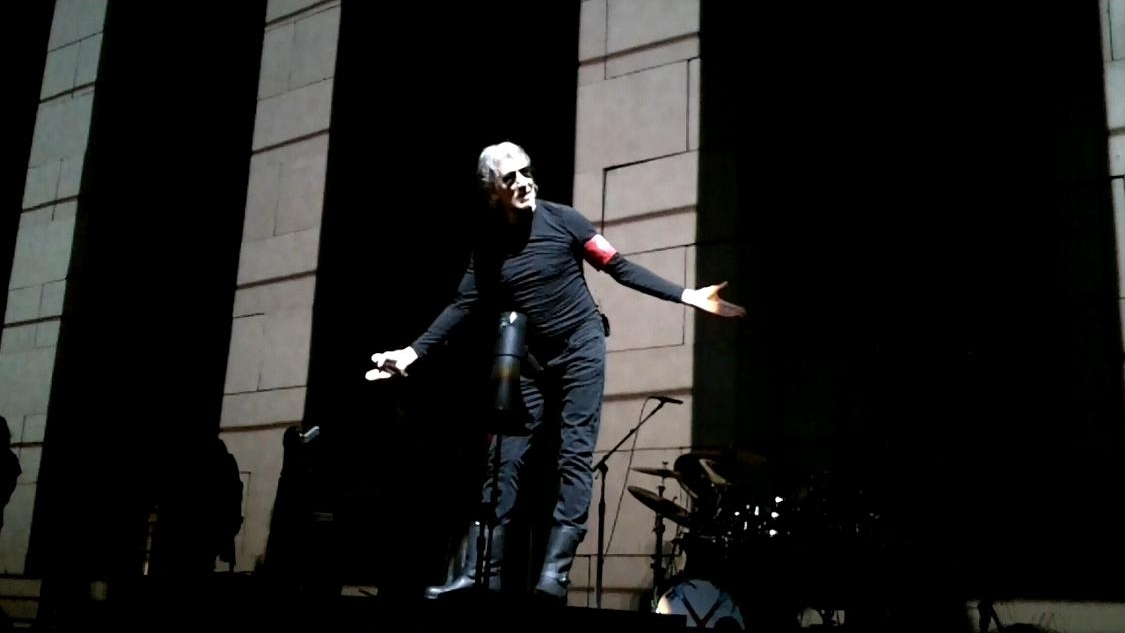
Playing a fascist dictator

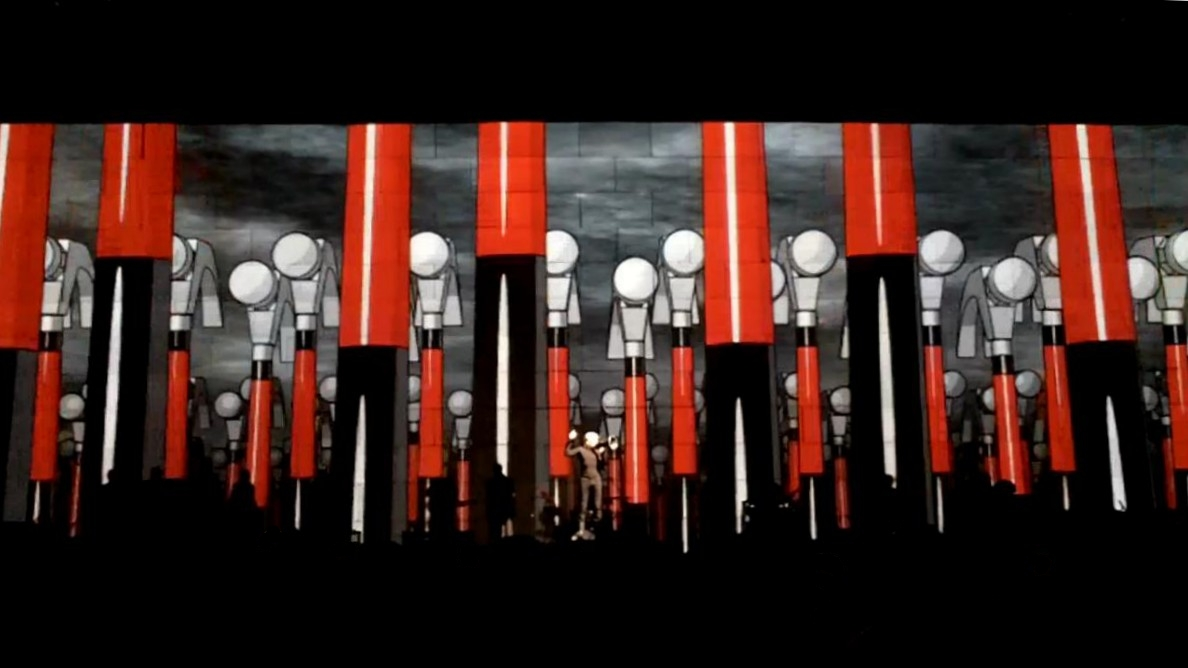
"Hammer!, Hammer!, Hammer!, Hammer!"

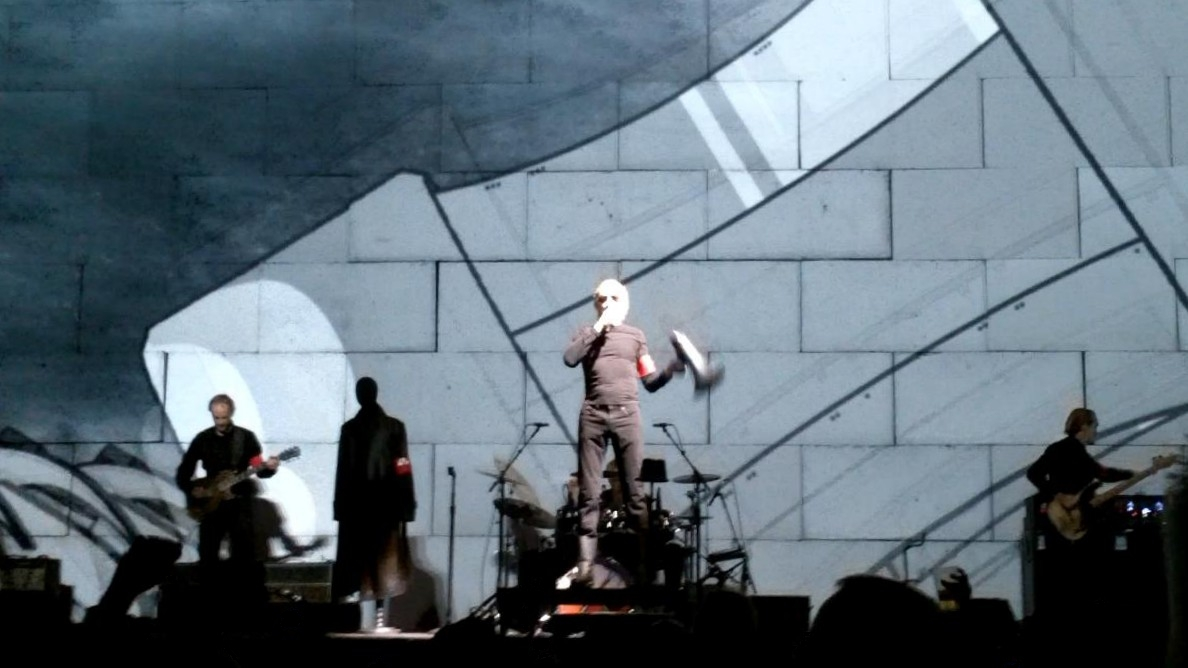
Performing "Stop"

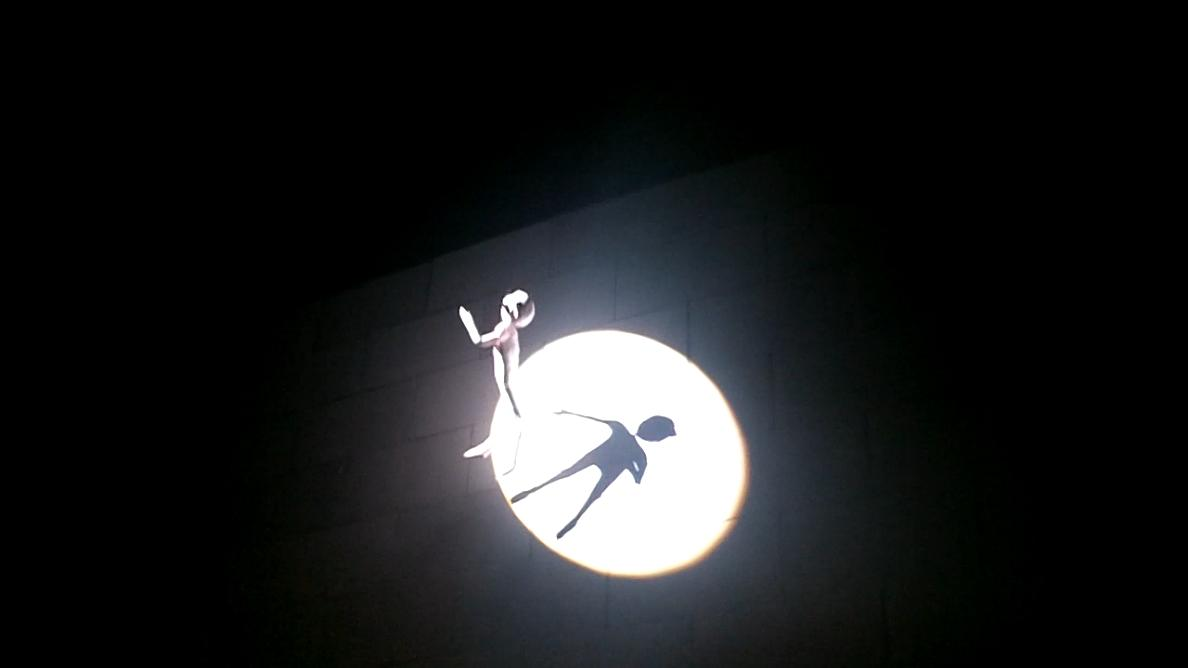
The "Pink" doll falling from the top of the wall as "The Trial" begins

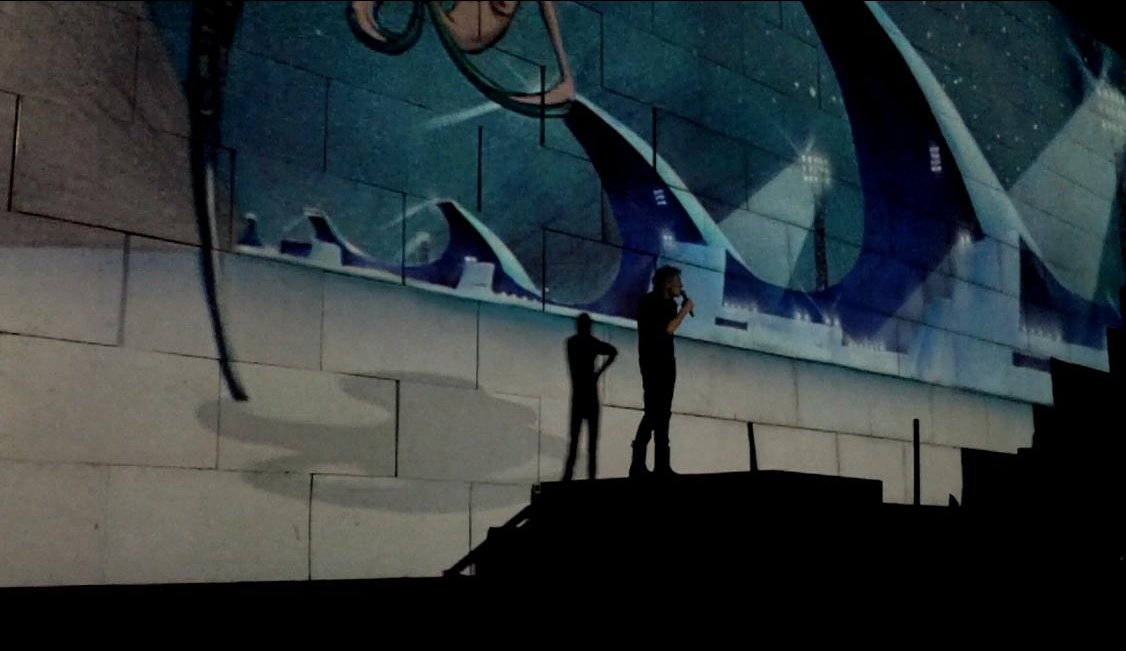
During "The Trial"

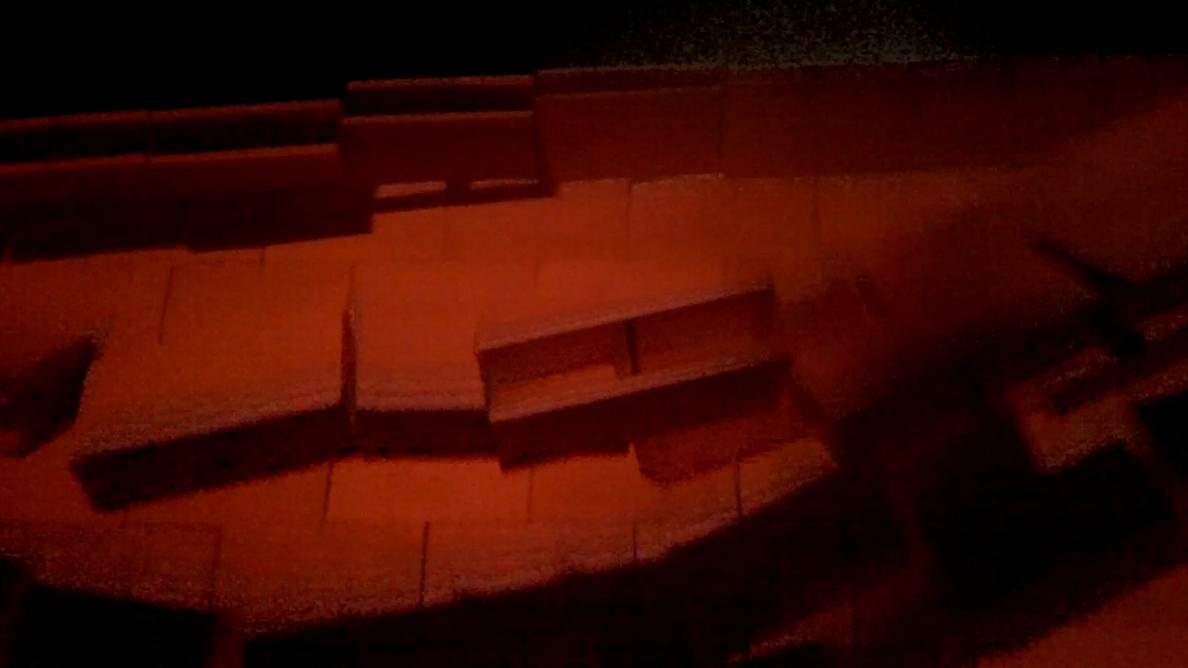
As the wall comes tumbling down at the end of "The Trial"

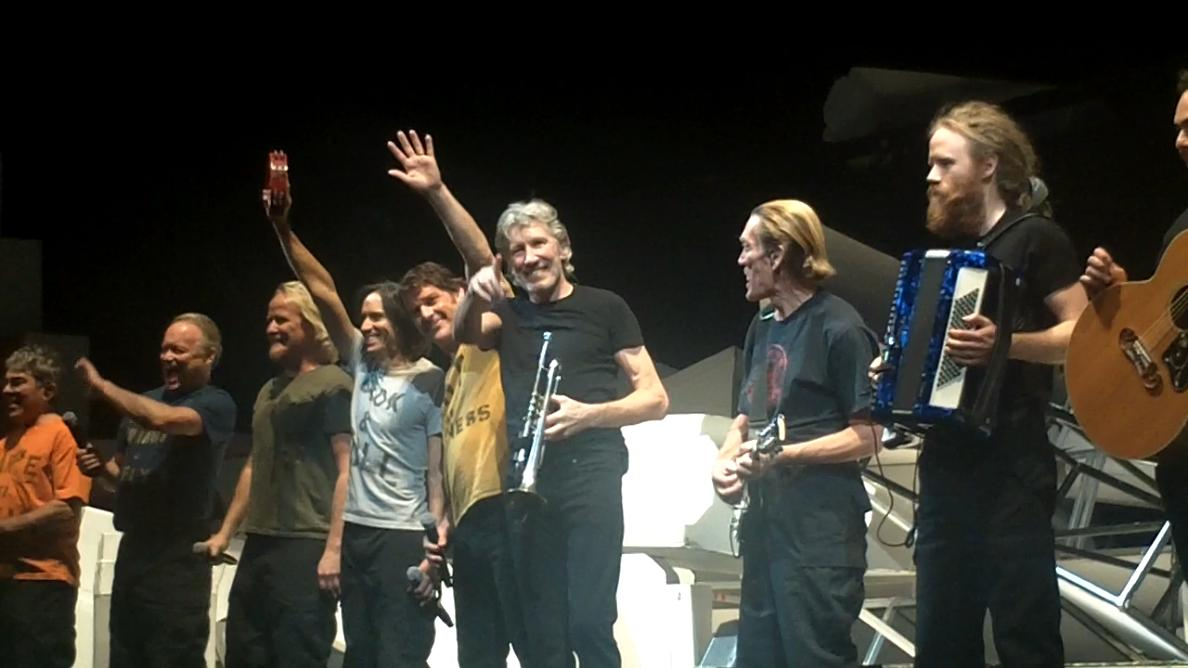
The epilogue, "Outside the Wall"

== See also ==
- List of highest-grossing concert series at a single venue
- List of highest-grossing concert tours
- List of most-attended concert series at a single venue
- List of most-attended concert tours
