= Yonder Mountain String Band =

American progressive bluegrass band

- Origin: Nederland, Colorado, United States
- Genres: Jamgrass
- Years active: 1998-present
- Labels: Frog Pad, Vanguard
- Members: Dave Johnston; Ben Kaufmann; Adam Aijala; Nick Piccininni; Coleman Smith
- Past members: Jeff Austin; Jacob Joliff; Allie Kral
- Website: www.yondermountain.com

Yonder Mountain String Band is an American progressive bluegrass group from Nederland, Colorado. Composed of Dave Johnston, Ben Kaufmann, Adam Aijala, Nick Piccininni, and Coleman Smith, the band has released eleven studio albums and six live records to date.

== History ==
Having met in Urbana, Illinois, banjo player Dave Johnston requested Jeff Austin to join and sing in his band The Bluegrassholes. Austin, who played no instrument, revealed to Johnston that he owned a mandolin, who then told him to come to the performance and "play anything, just play fast and loud."

After the collapse of The Bluegrassholes, Johnston moved to Boulder, Colorado, in order to further his bluegrass musical skills. Similarly, Austin moved to Colorado, but instead took up residence in the mountain town of Nederland, Colorado. Johnston soon joined him there. It was during this time in Nederland that Johnston and Austin met bassist Ben Kaufmann and guitarist Adam Aijala at a local club named the Verve. In December 1998, the four musicians formed Yonder Mountain String Band which was to open for a band at the Fox Theatre in Boulder. The band developed both a bluegrass and jam band fan base, and can often be found on tour. Their debut album Elevation was released on Frog Pad Records, an independent record label run by the band, in the fall of 1999.

From 1999 to 2001 they performed as one of the many attractions at NedFest, a music festival held in the band's hometown. By 2000, the group was also playing larger venues, such as The Fillmore in San Francisco, California. In 2005, their recording of "Think for Yourself" was included on the album This Bird Has Flown – A 40th Anniversary Tribute to the Beatles' Rubber Soul.

In 2008, the band performed at the 2008 Democratic National Convention in Denver.

In 2010, Yonder Mountain decided to host a music festival at Mulberry Mountain in Ozark, Arkansas called Yonder Mountain's Harvest Festival. This is the same site where the larger Wakarusa festival is held and where the previous Mulberry Mountain Harvest Fest was held. In 2011, the festival's headliners included Bela Fleck and the Flecktones, the Simcha Aknin Band, Railroad Earth and the Emmitt-Nershi Band.

In April 2014, Austin left the band due to "creative differences and conflicting career goals". After touring with the band since Austin's departure, fiddle player Allie Kral and mandolin player Jake Jolliff became official members of Yonder Mountain String Band in May 2015. In 2020, multi-instrumentalist/mandolinist Nick Piccininni joined after playing with the madgrass group Floodwood.

Their 2022 album Get Yourself Outside was a nominee for the 2023 Grammy for Best Bluegrass Album.

== Members ==
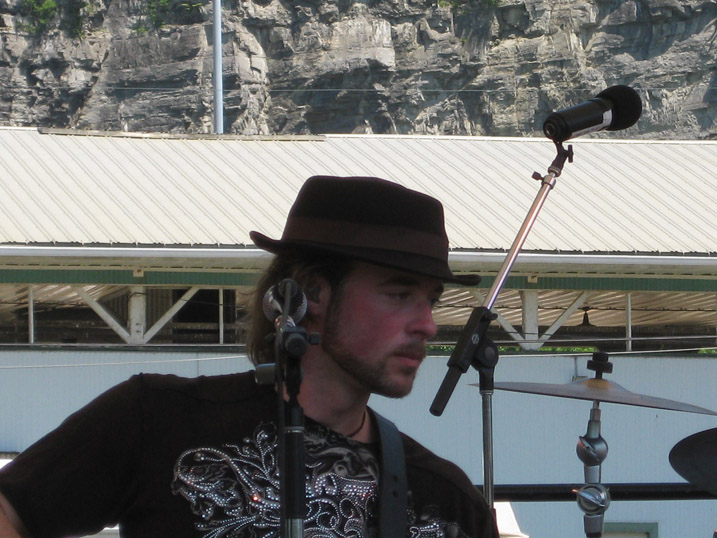
Ben Kaufmann at DelFest, 2010

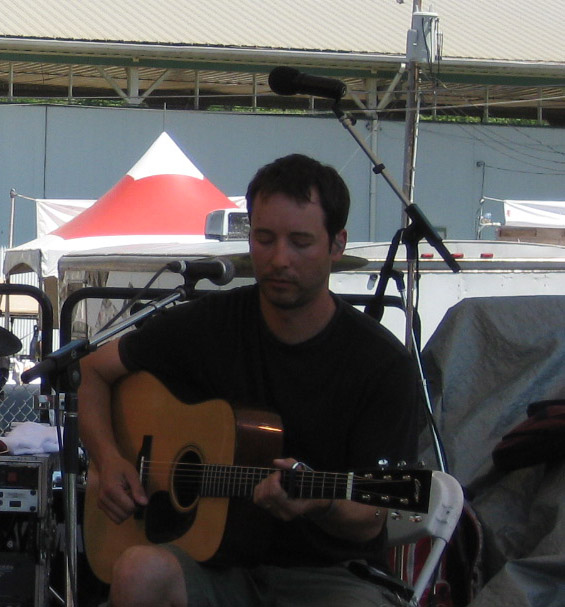
Adam Aijala at DelFest, 2010

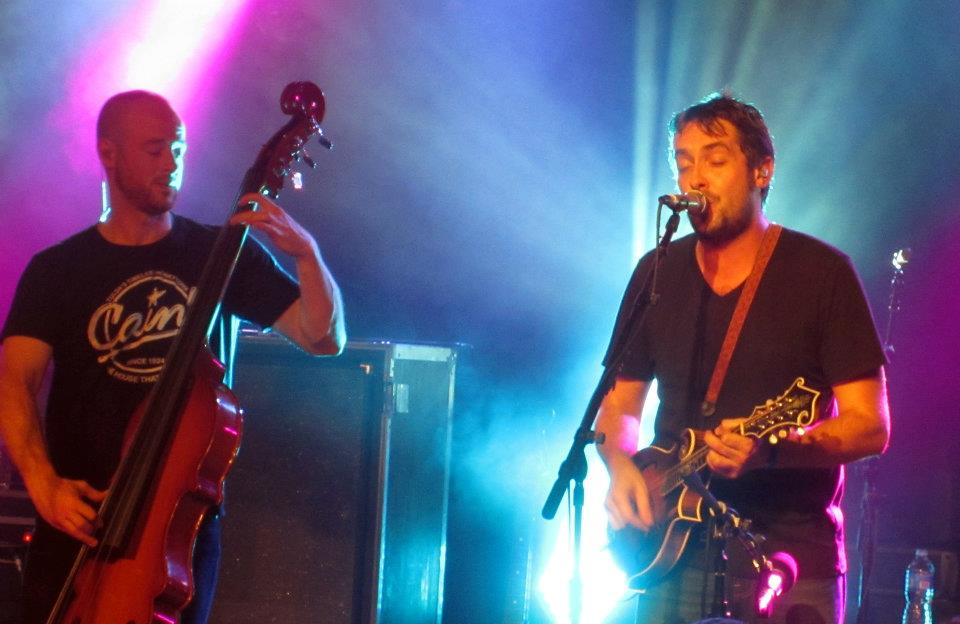
Ben Kaufmann, left, and Jeff Austin at Soundstage in Baltimore, 2012.

- Ben Kaufmann - bass, vocals
- Dave Johnston - banjo, vocals
- Adam Aijala - guitar, vocals
- Nick Piccininni - mandolin, fiddle, banjo, vocals
- Coleman Smith - fiddle

== Former members ==
- Jeff Austin - mandolin, vocals (1998–2014) – He would often break into a freeform scat during a song
- Jacob Jolliff - mandolin (2015–2020)
- Allie Kral - fiddle, vocals (2015–2022)

== Discography ==
Title	Album details	Peak chart positions			
Title	Album details	US Grass	US Country	US Heat	US Indie
Elevation	Release date: September 15, 1999; Label: Frog Pad Records	—	—	—	—
Mountain Tracks: Volume 1	Release date: November 30, 2000; Label: Frog Pad Records	—	—	—	—
Town by Town	Release date: September 7, 2001; Label: Frog Pad Records	—	—	—	—
Mountain Tracks: Volume 2	Release date: August 20, 2002; Label: Frog Pad Records	11	—	—	—
Old Hands	Release date: June 17, 2003; Label: Frog Pad Records	5	54	—	—
Mountain Tracks: Volume 3	Release date: September 14, 2004; Label: Frog Pad Records	2	67	—	—
Mountain Tracks: Volume 4	Release date: February 7, 2006; Label: Frog Pad Records	3	63	—	—
Yonder Mountain String Band	Release date: May 9, 2006; Label: Vanguard Records	1	57	39	43
Mountain Tracks: Volume 5	Release date: April 15, 2008; Label: Frog Pad Records	1	60	—	—
The Show	Release date: August 31, 2009; Label: Frog Pad Records	1	—	19	—
Black Sheep	Release date: June 16, 2015; Label: Frog Pad Records	3	—	—	—
Mountain Tracks: Volume 6	Release date: April 7, 2017; Label: Frog Pad Records	?	—	—	—
Love. Ain't Love	Release date: June 23, 2017; Label: Frog Pad Records	3	—	—	—
Get Yourself Outside	Release date: February 25, 2022; Label: Frog Pad Records	4	—	—	—
Nowhere Next	Release date: November 8, 2024; Label: Frog Pad Records	?	—	—	—
Good As True	Release date: March 27, 2026; Label: Frog Pad Records	?	—	—	—
"—" denotes releases that did not chart

== Music videos ==
- "Classic Situation"
- "Insult and an Elbow"
- "Bad Taste"
- "Alison"

== Frog Pad Records ==
Frog Pad Records is an independent record label run by the Yonder Mountain String Band. Used as a platform to launch their CDs, the label has since released numerous albums, as well as an anthology and some duet work by Jeff Austin and Chris Castino.
