= Jeff Austin (musician) =

American mandolinist and singer (1974–2019)

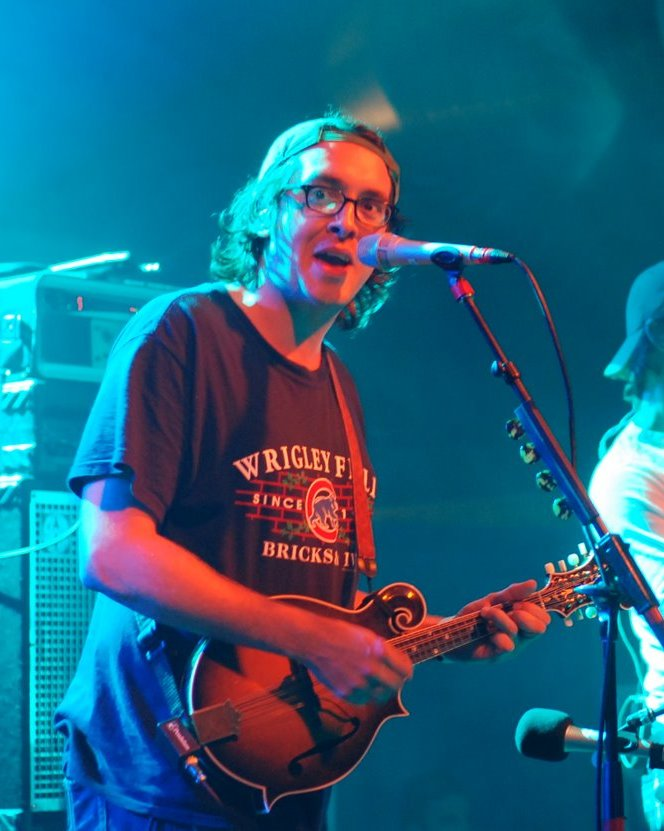
- Austin performing at the 2007 High Sierra Music Festival

Background information
- Born: April 25, 1974; Arlington Heights, Illinois, United States
- Died: June 24, 2019 (aged 45) Seattle, Washington, United States
- Genres: Progressive bluegrass Jam band
- Instrument: Mandolin
- Years active: 1998–2019
- Labels: Frog Pad Records; SCI Fidelity Records; Vanguard Records; Yep Roc Records
- Member of: Yonder Mountain String Band
- Website: www.jeffaustin.com

Jeff Austin (April 25, 1974 – June 24, 2019) was an American mandolinist and singer best known for being a founding member of the Yonder Mountain String Band.

== Biography ==
Austin was born in Arlington Heights, Illinois, United States, and grew up in Elk Grove Village, Illinois, where he attended Rolling Meadows High School. Austin attended the University of Cincinnati, but soon made his way to Urbana, Illinois, where he met future banjoist Dave Johnston. Receiving a request from Johnston to perform in his band The Bluegrassholes, Austin picked up the mandolin for the first time. After some time, Austin moved to Nederland, Colorado; Johnston, after seeking improvement in his playing ability, also moved to Nederland. While attending a club called the Verve, Austin met Adam Aijala and Ben Kaufmann, with whom he and Johnston would form the Yonder Mountain String Band (YMSB) in 1998.

In late 2013, Austin announced that he would be taking a leave of absence from YMSB due to the pending birth of his daughter. On April 23, 2014, the band announced an amicable parting of ways with Austin, citing creative differences and conflicting career goals.

In 2014, Austin formed the Jeff Austin Band. While the band saw many different lineups, it remained active until the time of his death.

On February 10, 2015, Austin released his solo debut album The Simple Truth on Yep Roc Records. The project features the likes of Cody Dickinson, the Royal Horns, Todd Snider, Jennifer Hartswick, Brendan Bayliss and Sarah Siskind, as well as Jeff Austin Band members at the time Danny Barnes, Ross Martin and Eric Thorin.

Jeff Austin died on June 24, 2019.

== Side projects ==
In March 2004, Austin released a full-length studio album with Chris Castino (The Big Wu) called Songs from the Tin Shed. This album of wistful cowboy music features Nick Forster and included guest appearances by Darol Anger, Sally Van Meter and Noam Pikelny.

In February 2006, Austin recorded Rex (Live at the Fillmore), a live album under the band name Grateful Grass featuring fellow musicians Keller Williams and Keith Moseley (The String Cheese Incident). Available only for digital download, the album features non-traditional bluegrass versions of songs by the Grateful Dead with 100% of the proceeds going to the Rex Foundation.

In 2010, he partnered with Brendan Bayliss of Umphrey's McGee to form a group called 30db. They put out an album called One Man Show on May 11, 2010 and played a small seven-show tour in May 2010 to promote the new album. Joining them on tour was Cody Dickinson from the North Mississippi Allstars, Nick Forster from the bluegrass band Hot Rize and Boulder-based Eric Thorin.

In 2013, Austin contributed the theme music and closing credits to the documentary I Know That Voice.
