= Roger Waters: The Wall (album) =

Live album by Roger Waters
- Released: 20 November 2015
- Recorded: July 2011–21 July 2012
- Venue: O.A.C.A. Olympic Indoor Hall Athens, Estadio Monumental Antonio Vespucio Liberti Buenos Aires, Plains of Abraham Quebec City
- Genre: Progressive rock
- Length: 102:21
- Label: Columbia Records
- Producer: Nigel Godrich

Roger Waters chronology
| Ça Ira (2005) | Roger Waters: The Wall (2015) | Is This the Life We Really Want? (2017) |

Roger Waters: The Wall is a live album by Roger Waters, a former member of Pink Floyd. It is a live recording of Pink Floyd's 1979 rock opera The Wall, captured during his solo tour of 2010–2013, The Wall Live.

== Track listing ==
The album was released in a 2-CD format, as well as a 3-LP format. All tracks are written by Roger Waters, expect where noted.

=== 2-CD Version ===
Disc one
| No. | Title | Music | Length |
|---|---|---|---|
| 1. | "In the Flesh?" | | 4:16 |
| 2. | "The Thin Ice" | | 2:48 |
| 3. | "Another Brick in the Wall (Part 1)" | | 4:09 |
| 4. | "The Happiest Days of Our Lives" | | 1:26 |
| 5. | "Another Brick in the Wall (Part 2)" | | 3:46 |
| 6. | "The Ballad of Jean Charles de Menezes" | | 2:55 |
| 7. | "Mother" | | 6:45 |
| 8. | "Goodbye Blue Sky" | | 3:40 |
| 9. | "Empty Spaces" | | 2:47 |
| 10. | "What Shall We Do Now?" | | 1:31 |
| 11. | "Young Lust" | Waters; David Gilmour | 4:03 |
| 12. | "One of My Turns" | | 3:26 |
| 13. | "Don't Leave Me Now" | | 4:13 |
| 14. | "Another Brick in the Wall (Part 3)" | | 1:23 |
| 15. | "The Last Few Bricks" | Waters; Gilmour | 3:15 |
| 16. | "Goodbye Cruel World" | | 1:35 |
| Total length: | | | 51:58 |

Disc two
| No. | Title | Music | Length |
|---|---|---|---|
| 1. | "Hey You" | | 4:43 |
| 2. | "Is There Anybody Out There?" | | 2:42 |
| 3. | "Nobody Home" | | 3:44 |
| 4. | "Vera" | | 1:09 |
| 5. | "Bring the Boys Back Home" | | 1:55 |
| 6. | "Comfortably Numb" | Gilmour; Waters | 7:35 |
| 7. | "The Show Must Go On" | | 2:32 |
| 8. | "In the Flesh" | | 4:43 |
| 9. | "Run Like Hell" | Gilmour; Waters | 6:28 |
| 10. | "Waiting for the Worms" | | 4:01 |
| 11. | "Stop" | | 0:31 |
| 12. | "The Trial" | Waters; Bob Ezrin | 6:31 |
| 13. | "Outside the Wall" | | 4:32 |
| Total length: | | | 51:06 |

=== 3-LP Version ===
Disc one

Side one
| No. | Title | Length |
|---|---|---|
| 1. | "In the Flesh?" | 4:16 |
| 2. | "The Thin Ice" | 2:48 |
| 3. | "Another Brick in the Wall (Part 1)" | 4:09 |
| 4. | "The Happiest Days of Our Lives" | 1:26 |
| 5. | "Another Brick in the Wall (Part 2)" | 3:46 |
| 6. | "The Ballad of Jean Charles de Menezes" | 2:55 |
| Total length: | | 19:22 |

Side two
| No. | Title | Length |
|---|---|---|
| 7. | "Mother" | 6:45 |
| 8. | "Goodbye Blue Sky" | 3:40 |
| 9. | "Empty Spaces" | 2:47 |
| 10. | "What Shall We Do Now?" | 1:31 |
| Total length: | | 14:13 |

Disc two

Side three
| No. | Title | Music | Length |
|---|---|---|---|
| 1. | "Young Lust" | Waters; Gilmour | 4:03 |
| 2. | "One of My Turns" | | 3:26 |
| 3. | "Don't Leave Me Now" | | 4:13 |
| 4. | "Another Brick in the Wall (Part 3)" | | 1:23 |
| 5. | "The Last Few Bricks" | Waters; Gilmour | 3:15 |
| 6. | "Goodbye Cruel World" | | 1:35 |
| Total length: | | | 17:55 |

Side four
| No. | Title | Length |
|---|---|---|
| 7. | "Hey You" | 4:43 |
| 8. | "Is There Anybody Out There?" | 2:42 |
| 9. | "Nobody Home" | 3:44 |
| 10. | "Vera" | 1:09 |
| 11. | "Bring the Boys Back Home" | 1:55 |
| Total length: | | 14:13 |

Disc three

Side five
| No. | Title | Music | Length |
|---|---|---|---|
| 1. | "Comfortably Numb" | Gilmour; Waters | 7:35 |
| 2. | "The Show Must Go On" | | 2:32 |
| 3. | "In the Flesh" | | 4:43 |
| 4. | "Run Like Hell" | Gilmour; Waters | 6:28 |
| Total length: | | | 21:18 |

Side six
| No. | Title | Music | Length |
|---|---|---|---|
| 5. | "Waiting for the Worms" | | 4:01 |
| 6. | "Stop" | | 0:31 |
| 7. | "The Trial" | Waters; Ezrin | 6:31 |
| 8. | "Outside the Wall" | | 4:32 |
| Total length: | | | 15:20 |

== Personnel ==
- Roger Waters : Vocals, guitar, bass, trumpet on "Outside the Wall"
- G. E. Smith : Guitar, bass
- Snowy White : Guitar
- David Kilminster : Guitar, bass on "Mother"
- Robbie Wyckoff : Vocals
- Jon Carin : Keyboards, guitar
- Harry Waters : Piano, harmonium
- Graham Broad : Drums
- Jon Joyce, Kipp Lennon, Mark Lennon, Pat Lennon : Backing vocals

== Charts ==
Chart performance for Roger Waters: The Wall
| Chart (2025) | Peak position |
|---|---|
| Norwegian Rock Albums (IFPI Norge) | 12 |

== Sources ==
- The Spotify page for the album
- Roger Waters: The Wall (album) at Discogs
