= Roger Waters: The Wall =

2014 concert film

- Film poster
- Directed by: Roger Waters; Sean Evans
- Written by: Roger Waters
- Produced by: Clare Spencer; Roger Waters
- Starring: Roger Waters; G. E. Smith; Dave Kilminster; Snowy White; Graham Broad; Jon Carin; Robbie Wyckoff
- Cinematography: Brett Turnbull
- Edited by: Katharine McQuerrey
- Production company: Picturehouse Entertainment
- Distributed by: Universal Pictures
- Release dates: 6 September 2014 (TIFF); 29 September 2015 (UK)
- Running time: 133 minutes
- Country: United Kingdom
- Language: English

Roger Waters: The Wall is a British concert film by Roger Waters. Directed by Waters and Sean Evans, it captures performances of Waters' live tour. It premiered in the Special Presentations section of the 2014 Toronto International Film Festival, with Waters and Evans in attendance. The concert design and execution draws heavily from the original concert of the same name that followed the release of the Pink Floyd album The Wall (1979).

In addition to the 90 minutes of music, the film also contains interspersed documentary and interview footage taken from a road trip in Europe, with Waters driving an old Bentley. Waters is also seen reading from John Berger's introduction to Fear, the English translation of Gabriel Chevallier's novel, La Peur.

The audio is presented in 7.1.4-channel Dolby Atmos.

== Track listing ==
Roger Waters: The Wall

Live album by Roger Waters
- Released: 2015 November 20
- Genre: Progressive rock
- Length: 120:43
- Label: Legacy Records

Roger Waters chronology
In the Flesh – Live (2000)	Roger Waters: The Wall (2015)	Roger Waters: Us + Them (2020)

1. "In the Flesh?"
2. "The Thin Ice"
3. "Another Brick in the Wall (Part 1)"
4. "The Happiest Days of Our Lives"
5. "Another Brick in the Wall (Part 2)"
6. "The Ballad of Jean Charles de Menezes"
7. "Mother"
8. "Goodbye Blue Sky"
9. "Empty Spaces" (actually the first half of "What Shall We Do Now?")
10. "What Shall We Do Now?"
11. "Young Lust"
12. "One of My Turns"
13. "Don't Leave Me Now"
14. "Another Brick in the Wall (Part 3)"
15. "The Last Few Bricks"
16. "Goodbye Cruel World"
17. "Hey You"
18. "Is There Anybody Out There?"
19. "Nobody Home"
20. "Vera"
21. "Bring the Boys Back Home"
22. "Comfortably Numb"
23. "The Show Must Go On"
24. "In the Flesh"
25. "Run Like Hell"
26. "Waiting for the Worms"
27. "Stop"
28. "The Trial"
29. "Outside the Wall"
