= Is There Anybody Out There? The Wall Live 1980–81 =

Live album by Pink Floyd
- Released: 27 March 2000
- Recorded: 7–9 August 1980; 14–17 June 1981
- Venues: Earls Court Exhibition Centre, London, England
- Genres: Progressive rock; hard rock
- Length: 105:21
- Label: EMI
- Producer: James Guthrie

Pink Floyd chronology
1967: The First Three Singles (1997)	Is There Anybody Out There? The Wall Live 1980–81 (2000)	Echoes: The Best of Pink Floyd (2001)

Professional ratings
Review scores
Source	Rating
Allmusic	3/5 stars
The Encyclopedia of Popular Music	3/5 stars
NME	(5/10)
Rolling Stone	2/5 stars

Is There Anybody Out There? The Wall Live 1980–81 is a live album released by Pink Floyd in 2000. It is a live rendition of The Wall, produced and engineered by James Guthrie, with tracks selected from the August 1980 and June 1981 performances at Earls Court in London. The album was first released in the United Kingdom on 27 March 2000, and a US/Canadian release by Columbia Records on 18 April.

The shows involved the construction of a wall on stage throughout the first half of the show. Once complete, members of the band performed in small openings in, atop, in front of, or even behind the wall. The album artwork featured the life-masks of the four band members in front of a black wall; the masks were worn by the "surrogate band" during the song "In the Flesh". "Goodbye Blue Sky" and parts of "Run Like Hell" were taken from the 17 June 1981 show, the very last performance by the four-man Pink Floyd until the 2005 Live 8 concert.

== Content ==
Is There Anybody Out There? contains live versions of all the original songs along with two additional songs: "What Shall We Do Now?" and "The Last Few Bricks". "What Shall We Do Now?" was planned for the original album but cut just before release. (It remained present on the lyric sheet for the original LP, but was removed from future CD re-releases.) "The Last Few Bricks" was an instrumental bridge between "Another Brick in the Wall (Part III)" and "Goodbye Cruel World", and contained themes from "The Happiest Days of Our Lives", "Don't Leave Me Now", "Young Lust", and "Empty Spaces", all transposed to D minor. It was played to allow the bricklayers to almost completely seal off the stage before Roger Waters appeared in the last brick-wide space in the wall to sing "Goodbye Cruel World", ending the first set of the show. This music never had an official title before the release of the live album. Fans named the track "Almost Gone" on some bootleg albums of the shows, but the official name was suggested by producer James Guthrie during the mixing of the live album. The album also contained two spoken tracks titled "MC: Atmos" ("Master of Ceremonies" for the first North American release), which served as introductions to the songs "In the Flesh?" and "In the Flesh", respectively. These were performed by Gary Yudman, MC for the Earls Court and Nassau Coliseum shows. Yudman's performance for "In the Flesh" (nearing just past the middle of the second act) had him dressed in white "zombie" make-up and he pretended to speak like a tape recording being played back at a slower speed. It's a common misconception that these are actual recordings of the first intro at the beginning of the concert. In fact the words from both of his performances at the beginning of the show and then towards the end never actually match at all. Every performance was different and was used by many bootleg collectors to identify which concert they were listening to ("The band is about ready to begin, I think ... No, not quite yet") of waiting for the band to start. Other performances featured Jim Ladd and his then fellow KMET disc jockey Cynthia Fox.

The tracks differed slightly from the studio album, primarily in terms of longer intros and extended solos. Due to the constraints of vinyl records, the band had been forced to severely edit many songs for the album, removing whole sections, many of which were restored in concert. For example, "The Show Must Go On" had an extra verse that was deleted from the original studio recording (but included in the lyric sheet, even on later CD releases.) "Outside the Wall" was longer and re-arranged with mandolin, accordion, clarinet, acoustic guitars, tambourines and more natural-sounding vocal harmonies from the quartet of Joe Chemay, Jim Farber, Jim Haas, and Jon Joyce. (This would be the third official version of "Outside the Wall" available to the listener, following the extended orchestral version from the 1982 film.)

== Release ==
The album was released to commemorate the 20th anniversary of The Wall and The Wall Tour.

Is There Anybody Out There? was re-issued in the US and Canada in July 2005, remastered by James Guthrie, Joel Plante and Kim Richards. The booklet features some songwriting updates and mentions that the MC: Atmos on disc one used a sample of "We'll Meet Again" by Vera Lynn.

The album was remastered and re-released in February 2012 as part of The Wall's ‘Immersion’ boxset. Despite this, it remained absent from most music streaming platforms—except for YouTube Music—until December 2024, when it was finally added to the Apple Music catalog. However, it continues to be unavailable on other major streaming services, including Spotify. The addition to Apple Music was likely due to Sony Music Entertainment’s acquisition of Pink Floyd’s music rights in October 2024, which may have facilitated the album’s availability on the platform. However, by September 2025, the album had been pulled from both Apple Music and YouTube Music for unknown reasons.

== Track listing ==
All tracks are written and sung by Roger Waters, except where noted.

Disc one
No.	Title	Music	Vocals	Length
1.	"Master of Ceremonies" (9 August 1980; includes excerpt from "We'll Meet Again")	N/A	Yudman	1:13
2.	"In the Flesh?" (7 August 1980/8 August 1980/9 August 1980)			3:00
3.	"The Thin Ice" (9 August 1980)		David Gilmour, Waters	2:49
4.	"Another Brick in the Wall - Pt 1" (7 August 1980/8 August 1980/9 August 1980)		Waters, Gilmour	4:13
5.	"The Happiest Days of Our Lives" (7 August 1980/8 August 1980/9 August 1980)		Waters, Gilmour	1:40
6.	"Another Brick in the Wall - Pt 2" (7 August 1980/8 August 1980/9 August 1980/14 June 1981)		Gilmour, Waters	6:19
7.	"Mother" (16 June 1981/17 June 1981)		Waters, Gilmour	7:54
8.	"Goodbye Blue Sky" (17 June 1981)		Gilmour	3:15
9.	"Empty Spaces" (14 June 1981)			2:14
10.	" What Shall We Do Now?" (14 June 1981/17 June 1981)			1:40
11.	"Young Lust" (7 August 1980/8 August 1980/9 August 1980)	Waters, Gilmour	Gilmour, Waters	5:17
12.	"One of My Turns" (7 August 1980/8 August 1980/9 August 1980)			3:41
13.	"Don't Leave Me Now" (7 August 1980/8 August 1980/9 August 1980/17 June 1981)			4:08
14.	"Another Brick in the Wall - Pt 3" (7 August 1980/8 August 1980/9 August 1980)			1:15
15.	"The Last Few Bricks" (7 August 1980/8 August 1980)	Waters, Gilmour	Instrumental	3:26
16.	"Goodbye Cruel World" (8 August 1980)			1:41
Total length:				53:50

Disc two
No.	Title	Music	Vocals	Length
1.	"Hey You" (16 June 1981/17 June 1981)		Gilmour, Waters	4:55
2.	"Is There Anybody Out There?" (15 June 1981)		Waters, Gilmour	3:09
3.	"Nobody Home" (14 June 1981/16 June 1981/17 June 1981)			3:15
4.	"Vera" (15 June 1981)			1:27
5.	"Bring the Boys Back Home" (15 June 1981)			1:20
6.	"Comfortably Numb" (14 June 1981/15 June 1981/16 June 1981/17 June 1981)	Gilmour, Waters	Gilmour, Waters	7:26
7.	"The Show Must Go On" (16 June 1981)		Gilmour	2:35
8.	"MC: Atmos" (16 June 1981)	N/A	Yudman	0:37
9.	"In the Flesh" (7 August 1980/8 August 1980)			4:23
10.	"Run Like Hell" (14 June 1981/15 June 1981/16 June 1981/17 June 1981)	Gilmour, Waters	Gilmour, Waters	7:05
11.	"Waiting for the Worms" (14 June 1981/15 June 1981/16 June 1981)		Waters, Gilmour	4:14
12.	"Stop" (9 August 1980)			0:30
13.	"The Trial" (9 August 1980)	Waters, Bob Ezrin		6:01
14.	"Outside the Wall" (8 August 1980)			4:27
Total length:				51:31

== Personnel ==
Pink Floyd

- David Gilmour – electric guitar and acoustic guitars, vocals, mandolin on "Outside the Wall", musical director
- Roger Waters – vocals, bass guitar, acoustic guitar on "Mother", clarinet on "Outside the Wall"
- Nick Mason – drums, percussion, acoustic guitar on "Outside the Wall"
- Richard Wright – piano, organ, synthesizer, accordion on "Outside the Wall" (During the tour, Wright was no longer part of the band, but hired as a session musician. Despite this, he was listed as a band member in the tour program and the album credits)

Additional personnel

- Peter Wood – keyboards, acoustic guitar on "Outside the Wall"
- Snowy White – guitars (1980 shows)
- Andy Roberts – guitars (1981 shows)
- Andy Bown – bass guitar, acoustic guitar on "Outside the Wall"
- Willie Wilson – drums, percussion (Except for the 14 June 1981 Show)
- Clive Brooks – drums, percussion (14 June 1981 Show)
- Joe Chemay – backing vocals
- Stan Farber – backing vocals
- Jim Haas – backing vocals
- Jon Joyce – backing vocals
- Gary Yudman – MC

== Charts and certifications ==
Weekly chart performance for Is There Anybody Out There? The Wall Live 1980–81
Chart (2000)	Peak position
Argentina (CAPIF)	8
Austrian Albums (Ö3 Austria)	3
Belgian Albums (Ultratop Flanders)	7
Belgian Albums (Ultratop Wallonia)	5
Canadian Albums (Billboard)	4
Canada Top Albums/CDs (RPM)	10
Dutch Albums (Album Top 100)	4
French Albums (SNEP)	8
German Albums (Offizielle Top 100)	3
Irish Albums (IRMA)	22
Italian Albums (FIMI)	2
New Zealand Albums (RMNZ)	4
Norwegian Albums (VG-lista)	2
Portuguese Albums (AFP)	1
Scottish Albums (Official Charts)	16
Swedish Albums (Sverigetopplistan)	50
Swiss Albums (Schweizer Hitparade)	3
UK Albums (Official Charts)	15
US Billboard 200	19

2000 year-end chart performance for Is There Anybody Out There? The Wall Live 1980–81
Chart (2000)	Peak position
UK Albums (OCC)	202

Singles
Year	Single	Chart	Position
2000	"Young Lust"	Mainstream Rock Tracks	15

=== Certifications ===
Region	Certification	Certified units/sales
United Kingdom (BPI)	Gold	100,000^{*}
United States (RIAA)	Platinum	500,000^{^}
^{*} Sales figures based on certification alone.^{^} Shipments figures based on certification alone.
