= The Wall Tour (1980–1981) =

1980–1981 concert tour by Pink Floyd

- Tour by Pink Floyd
- A poster advertising the February 1981 concerts at the Westfalenhallen in Dortmund, West Germany
- Location: Europe; North America
- Associated album: The Wall
- Start date: 7 February 1980
- End date: 17 June 1981
- Legs: 5
- No. of shows: 31

Pink Floyd concert chronology
- In the Flesh Tour (1977); The Wall Tour (1980–1981); A Momentary Lapse of Reason Tour (1987–1989)

The Wall Tour was a concert tour by the English progressive rock band Pink Floyd throughout 1980–1981 in support of their eleventh studio album The Wall (1979).

The tour was relatively small compared to previous tours for a major release, with only 31 shows performed across four venues. Concerts were performed only in England, the United States and Germany. The tour was notable for its extensive use of stage theatrics, most notably a giant wall constructed across the stage to convey the sense of alienation present in both the album, and Roger Waters' personal feelings at the time.

This was the last tour of Pink Floyd with Roger Waters, before his departure in 1985. 17 June 1981 was the last concert of the tour, and the band's last full concert with Waters (he joined them again on 2 July 2005 at Live 8).

== History ==
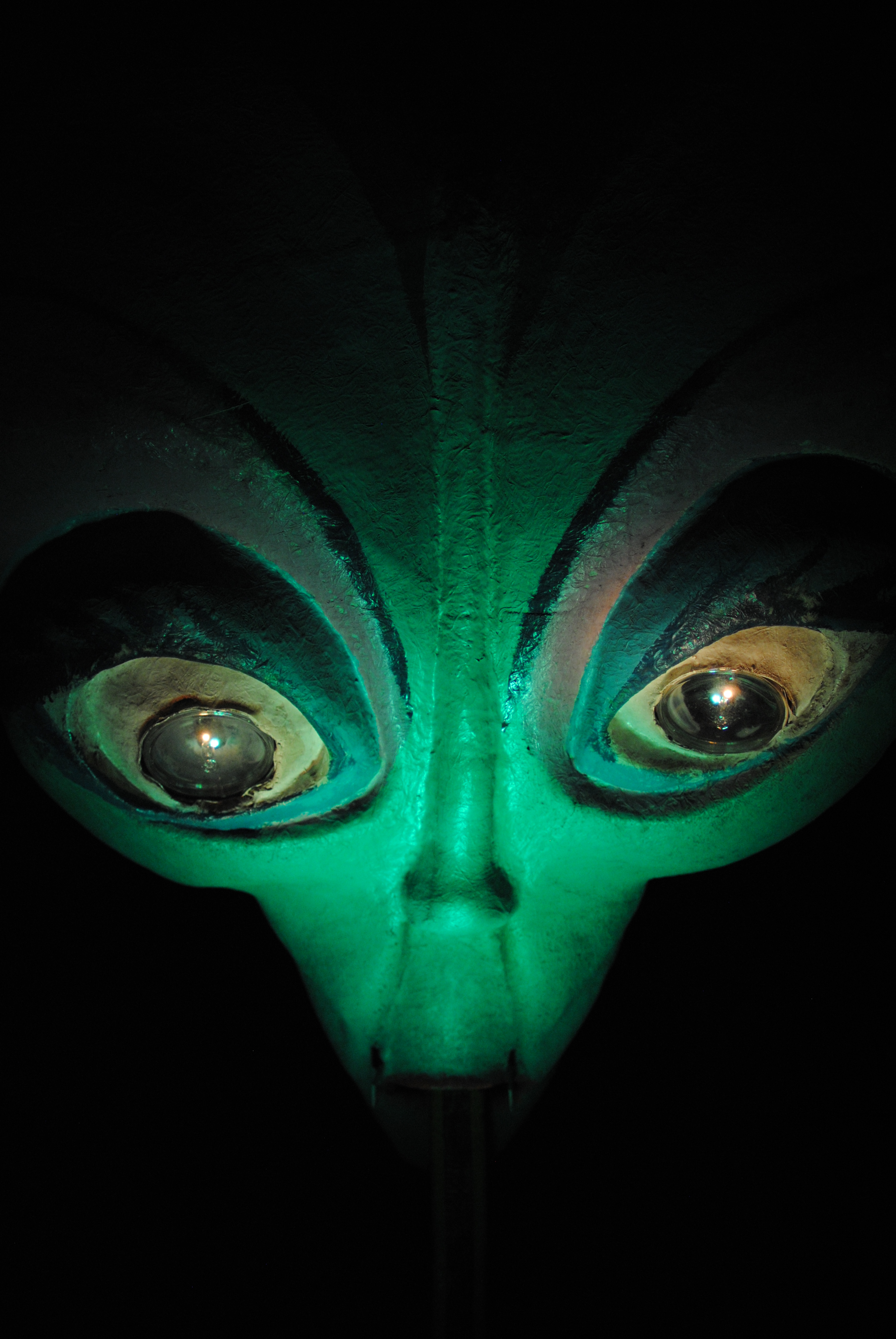
Head of the 'wife' puppet; displayed at the Pink Floyd: Their Mortal Remains exhibition.

"I was struck by the thought that there was a huge wall, that you couldn't see, between me and the audience," explained Roger Waters. "Then I drew it and started to talk to people about it. And they thought I was mad, because my original idea was to start building a wall at the beginning of the show and, when it's finished, they can't see you or hear you any more, and then the show is over."

The shows involved pyrotechnics, most prominently featuring a model Stuka aeroplane flown over the audience towards the beginning of each performance, crashing and exploding as it hit the wall. This stunt caused a mishap during the first night of the tour, when it set the stage curtains on fire. The stadium had to be evacuated, but following the revelation of the surrogate band, Waters had difficulty convincing the audience that the fire was not also part of the performance. No serious injuries occurred.

Unlike prior tours, The Wall required precise timing and staging (allowing for little improvisation). For "Comfortably Numb", while Waters sang his opening verse, David Gilmour waited in darkness at the top of the wall, standing on a flight case on casters, held steady by a technician, both precariously balanced atop a hydraulic platform. On cue, bright blue and white lights would suddenly illuminate him. At the very end of each concert, the wall would be dramatically torn down, controlled carefully by tipping mechanisms in order to prevent the front rows of the audience from being harmed.

The tour's costs were estimated to have reached US$1.5 million even before the first performance (equivalent to US$4.7 million as of 2021). The New York Times stated in its 2 March 1980 edition: "The Wall show remains a milestone in rock history though and there's no point in denying it. Never again will one be able to accept the technical clumsiness, distorted sound and meagre visuals of most arena rock concerts as inevitable." It concluded, "The Wall show will be the touchstone against which all future rock spectacles must be measured."

Nick Mason explained:

The problem, really, with the show is that it wasn't a touring show, so it had to be set up, and left, and taken down again. There were a lot of light operators and stage operators and wall builders. Because of the amount of stuff that went up and down, floated across, did this, did that, there were a lot of operators, rather than just people putting stuff up. And, of course we had lots of semis, as I believe you call them, because of the special lighting pods that we used which needed, each one needs a trailer unit to hold it. And the special stage, because of the way the stage was actually used, there was a sort of structural bracing piece for the building of the wall. So it was all special equipment, I mean it was absurdly expensive. It's not something other people will do, generally, because it's just so expensive to put on, it's simply not feasible. But it was great to have done it once.

The concert was performed just 31 times in four cities: Los Angeles (7 shows), Uniondale (5), Dortmund (8) and London (11). The primary 'tour' consisted of 18 shows in L.A., Uniondale and London in 1980, but the band performed a further eight shows in Dortmund (13–20 February 1981) and five more shows at Earl's Court (13–17 June) for filming, with the intention of integrating the shows into the upcoming movie

The London shows are documented on the album Is There Anybody Out There? The Wall Live 1980-81.

Gilmour and Mason attempted to convince Waters to expand the show for a more lucrative, large-scale stadium tour, but because of the nature of the material (one of the primary themes is the distance between an artist and his audience) Waters balked at this.

On tour, relations between Gilmour, Mason, Waters and Richard Wright were at an all-time low: their four Winnebagos were parked in a circle with the doors facing away from the centre; an isolated Waters used his own vehicle to arrive at each venue and stayed in separate hotels from Gilmour, Mason and Wright. Despite having been removed as a formal member of the band upon completion of the album, Wright agreed to complete the tour as a salaried musician, and consequently ended up being the only member of the group who made any money from the venture. "I did not just want to walk out on this great thing I'd been working on," he recalled. "I just decided I'd go out and play my best, possibly with the hope that, if it worked out, [Waters'] decision to have me out could have been reverted."

== Concert film ==
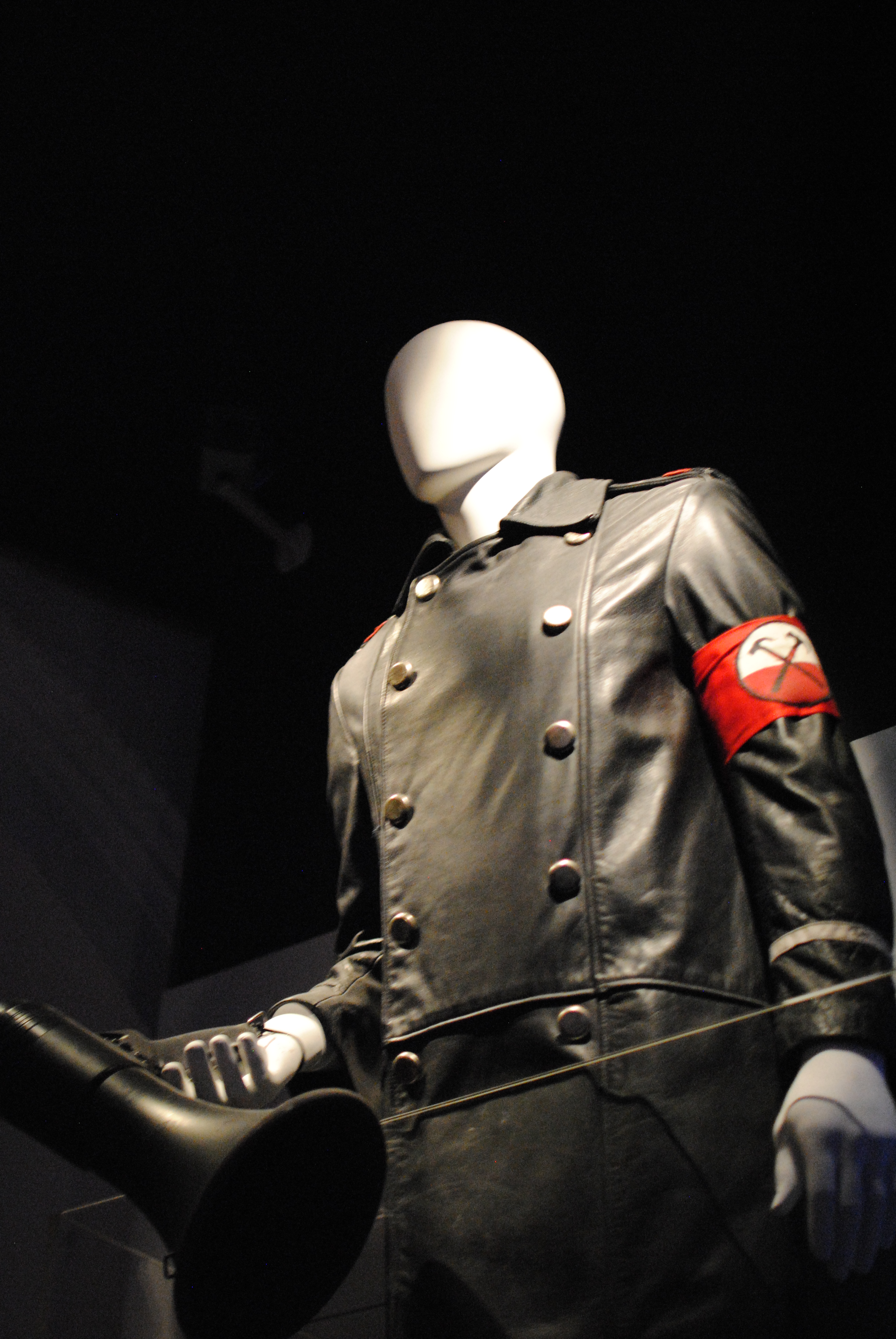
Mannequin dressed in one of Waters' costumes from the tour; displayed at the Pink Floyd: Their Mortal Remains exhibition

The idea to include live concert footage of any significant length for The Wall film was dropped shortly before the final shows took place. There are conflicting statements regarding the professionally filmed footage. It had been widely believed that 'the wrong type of film' had been used and the results were dark and murky. Mark Fisher, partly responsible for designing the show said the footage was: 'very dark and horrible and boring and should be burned'. Alan Parker himself said: '[the filming of the shows were] five blown opportunities'. These rumours were partially scotched when the Channel 4 documentary 'Behind the Wall' (2000) used perfectly clear master videotape footage from the Earls Court 1980 concerts, as well as pristine film footage from the Earls Court 1981 concerts. 27 February, 6-7-8-9 August 1980 concerts were shot on videotape, while 13-14-15-16-17 June 1981 were shot on Eastman 125T film stock, using Panavision (anamorphic) Panaflex Gold cameras. These cameras can be seen in various photographs from the June 1981 leg. Attempts to brighten up the show for the film were successful, however the ISO for the filming was too low, thus Parker deeming the footage "a waste". David Gilmour has stated in an interview that only three tracks were captured on film:

"About 20 minutes were shot – for example, "Hey You", where the camera was behind the wall focusing on us, then it went up and over the wall onto the audience. That's a great bit of footage. But only three tracks were filmed."

However, this is referring to the studio productions for the 1982 movie; shortly before the June 1981 leg ended, the band had come to the realization that they would need close-ups of the musicians on-stage. To solve this, they recreated the Earls Court concert stage at Pinewood Studios for the sole purpose of shooting close-ups. They did several takes of "The Happiest Days of Our Lives"; "Another Brick in The Wall pt. 2"; "Mother"; and "Hey You". The reason that they chose to do the close-ups in a studio as opposed to the live shows is due to the fact that they didn't want the cameras on the stage to distract the audience. The close-ups presented in official teasers from 1981 are from the studio session.

In an interview with Chris Salewicz during the Radio KAOS tour in 1987, Waters claims that attempts to put it out were shut down, as it doesn't do the original concerts justice.

"There was an attempt made to put it on to video, and I have consistently stamped on any moves to get that video out because it does not do justice to what was a very theatrical event. Maybe in twenty years time, as sort of archive material, I might be prepared to release it. But I quite like the fact that the people who went to the shows copped it for what it meant to be, where it was meant to be, and nobody has been allowed to sell a third-rate, tacky version on video."

Roger Waters said on an episode of In the Studio with Redbeard which devoted two parts to the making of The Wall that "the London shows in 1980/81 were filmed and he had all of the footage and was thinking of putting it together to be released. However felt extremely reluctant to release the concerts on the video cassette format". He also would have to refer to the shows as a document of what went on.

In the December 2009 issue of Mojo, Roger Waters revealed that he had 'discovered a whole load of new footage of The Wall shows' and was busy 'editing it'. He explained that he assumed the cameramen decided to shoot more than they were asked to as they had the cameras and "nobody [seemed] bothered". Waters has stated that the film was shot on 70mm, however this is false; it was shot on 35mm film and the negatives were printed as 70mm.

In Rolling Stone magazine, Waters expresses that the footage would "undoubtedly" be released to the public.

During Waters' tour of The Wall in 2010 footage of Waters performing his vocal parts in "Mother", labelled as being filmed in Earls Court in 1980, was projected onto the incomplete wall. The first verse comes from the studio session in 1981, and the second verse comes from 7 August 1980.

DVD of The Wall Immersion Box Set includes the professionally shot 35mm footage of "The Happiest Days of Our Lives" at Earls Court, 1981, with mixed footage from 13 to 17 June. The footage seen on the bootleg Divided We Fall by Harvested DVD is from 6–9 August 1980, while the audio is soundboard from 8 August in the first set, and 9 August in the second set.

== Personnel ==
Pink Floyd

- David Gilmour – electric and acoustic guitars, vocals, mandolin on "Outside the Wall", musical director
- Nick Mason – drums, percussion, acoustic guitar on "Outside the Wall"
- Roger Waters – bass guitar, vocals, acoustic guitar on "Mother", clarinet on "Outside the Wall"
- Richard Wright – piano, organ, synthesiser, accordion on "Outside The Wall"

Additional artists

- Andy Bown – bass guitar, acoustic guitar on "Outside the Wall"
- Snowy White – guitars (1980 shows)
- Andy Roberts – guitars (1981 shows)
- Willie Wilson – drums, percussion
- Clive Brooks – drums, percussion (Nick Mason's drum tech replaced Willie Wilson on 13–14 June 1981)
- Peter Wood – keyboards, acoustic guitar on "Outside the Wall"
- Joe Chemay – backing vocals
- Stan Farber – backing vocals
- Jim Haas – backing vocals
- John Joyce – backing vocals
- Gary Yudman – MC (New York and London)
- Cynthia Fox – MC (Los Angeles)
- Jim Ladd – MC (Los Angeles)
- Ace Young – MC (Los Angeles)
- Willi Thomczyk – MC (Dortmund)

== Set list ==
The tour set lists comprised the entire album, The Wall, and songs that were not included on the original album; "What Shall We Do Now?", as well as an extra verse in "The Show Must Go On", and the then-untitled instrumental "The Last Few Bricks".

First set

1. "In the Flesh?"
2. "The Thin Ice"
3. "Another Brick in the Wall, Part 1"
4. "The Happiest Days of Our Lives"
5. "Another Brick in the Wall, Part 2"
6. "Mother"
7. "Goodbye Blue Sky"
8. "Empty Spaces"
9. "What Shall We Do Now?"
10. "Young Lust"
11. "One of My Turns"
12. "Don't Leave Me Now"
13. "Another Brick in the Wall, Part 3"
14. "The Last Few Bricks"
15. "Goodbye Cruel World"

Second set

16. "Hey You"
17. "Is There Anybody Out There?"
18. "Nobody Home"
19. "Vera"
20. "Bring the Boys Back Home"
21. "Comfortably Numb"
22. "The Show Must Go On"
23. "In the Flesh"
24. "Run Like Hell"
25. "Waiting for the Worms"
26. "Stop"
27. "The Trial"
28. "Outside the Wall"

== Tour dates ==
List of 1980 concerts
Date (1980)	City	Country	Venue	Attendance
7 February	Los Angeles	United States	Los Angeles Memorial Sports Arena	74,900 / 74,900 -- $1,106,000
8 February	Los Angeles	United States	Los Angeles Memorial Sports Arena	74,900 / 74,900 -- $1,106,000
9 February	Los Angeles	United States	Los Angeles Memorial Sports Arena	74,900 / 74,900 -- $1,106,000
10 February	Los Angeles	United States	Los Angeles Memorial Sports Arena	74,900 / 74,900 -- $1,106,000
11 February	Los Angeles	United States	Los Angeles Memorial Sports Arena	74,900 / 74,900 -- $1,106,000
12 February	Los Angeles	United States	Los Angeles Memorial Sports Arena	74,900 / 74,900 -- $1,106,000
13 February	Los Angeles	United States	Los Angeles Memorial Sports Arena	74,900 / 74,900 -- $1,106,000
24 February	Uniondale	United States	Nassau Veterans Memorial Coliseum	72,500
25 February	Uniondale	United States	Nassau Veterans Memorial Coliseum	72,500
26 February	Uniondale	United States	Nassau Veterans Memorial Coliseum	72,500
27 February	Uniondale	United States	Nassau Veterans Memorial Coliseum	72,500
28 February	Uniondale	United States	Nassau Veterans Memorial Coliseum	72,500
4 August	London	England	Earls Court Exhibition Centre	120,000
5 August	London	England	Earls Court Exhibition Centre	120,000
6 August	London	England	Earls Court Exhibition Centre	120,000
7 August	London	England	Earls Court Exhibition Centre	120,000
8 August	London	England	Earls Court Exhibition Centre	120,000
9 August	London	England	Earls Court Exhibition Centre	120,000

List of 1981 concerts
Date (1981)	City	Country	Venue	Attendance
13 February	Dortmund	West Germany	Westfalenhallen	132,000
14 February	Dortmund	West Germany	Westfalenhallen	132,000
15 February	Dortmund	West Germany	Westfalenhallen	132,000
16 February	Dortmund	West Germany	Westfalenhallen	132,000
17 February	Dortmund	West Germany	Westfalenhallen	132,000
18 February	Dortmund	West Germany	Westfalenhallen	132,000
19 February	Dortmund	West Germany	Westfalenhallen	132,000
20 February	Dortmund	West Germany	Westfalenhallen	132,000
13 June	London	England	Earls Court Exhibition Centre	100,000
14 June	London	England	Earls Court Exhibition Centre	100,000
15 June	London	England	Earls Court Exhibition Centre	100,000
16 June	London	England	Earls Court Exhibition Centre	100,000
17 June	London	England	Earls Court Exhibition Centre	100,000
