= The Last Few Bricks =

1980 instrumental by Pink Floyd

Instrumental by Pink Floyd

from the album Is There Anybody Out There? The Wall Live 1980–81
- Released: 4 April 2000
- Recorded: 7/9 August 1980
- Genre: Instrumental rock, progressive rock, art rock, hard rock
- Length: 3:26 (Is There Anybody Out There? The Wall Live 1980-81 version); 3:24 (The Wall - Live in Berlin version combined with Another Brick in the Wall, Part 3); 3:15 (Roger Waters: The Wall version)
- Label: EMI (UK), Columbia (US)
- Songwriters: Roger Waters; David Gilmour
- Producer: James Guthrie

"The Last Few Bricks" is an instrumental bridge/medley used by Pink Floyd and Roger Waters at The Wall live shows, between "Another Brick in the Wall, Part 3" and "Goodbye Cruel World".

== Composition ==
It was composed specifically for the purpose of allowing the bricklayer roadies more time to finish constructing the wall, to seal off the stage almost completely, before Waters appeared in the last one-brick-wide space in the wall to sing "Goodbye Cruel World", and end the first part of the show.

The piece doesn't have a strict composition, varying from venue to venue, but it usually contained themes from "The Happiest Days of Our Lives", "Don't Leave Me Now", "Young Lust", "Empty Spaces", and occasionally, when the bricklayers were running especially late, a jam (in the jazzier style of the earlier, improv-oriented Floyd) similar to "Any Colour You Like" (D minor to G major), was played. The themes from "Don't Leave Me Now" and "Young Lust" were transposed down a whole step, so, like much of the album, "The Last Few Bricks" is in D minor—which leads to a "brightening" effect, when "Goodbye Cruel World" begins in the parallel key of D major.

== Title ==
The instrumental bridge debuted with The Wall Tour, but was given no official name at the time. Fans called the track "Almost Gone" on some bootleg albums of the shows.

The album of the 1990 Berlin performance was the first official release of the bridge. However, it was not marked as a separate track, and instead was simply included as an extended section of the third part of "Another Brick in the Wall".

Roger Waters had long resisted requests to release the recordings of The Wall Tour, but changed his mind to allow a twentieth-anniversary live album release in 2000. During the mixing and editing of this album, producer James Guthrie suggested the title "The Last Few Bricks" for the bridge. Waters liked the title, and it was used for the live album Is There Anybody Out There? The Wall Live 1980–81, and all subsequent releases (e.g. the album of Waters' own live performances, Roger Waters: The Wall).

== Performance ==
The longest performance of this medley was on 7 February 1980 at Los Angeles Sports Arena when "Another Brick in the Wall (Part III)" was stretched to over 13 minutes.
