= The Wall – Live in Berlin =

Live album by Roger Waters
- Released: 17 September 1990 (UK)
- Recorded: 21 July 1990
- Venues: Death Strip (Berlin, East Germany)
- Genre: Progressive rock
- Label: Mercury
- Producers: Roger Waters; Nick Griffiths

Roger Waters chronology
| Radio K.A.O.S. (1987) | The Wall – Live in Berlin (1990) | Amused to Death (1992) |

Roger Waters live chronology
| The Wall – Live in Berlin (1990) | In the Flesh – Live (2000) |

Roger Waters tours chronology
| K.A.O.S. On the Road (1987) | The Wall – Live in Berlin (1990) | In the Flesh (1999–2002) |

Alternative cover
- Reissued 2003 cover

Singles from The Wall – Live in Berlin
- 1. "Another Brick in the Wall, Part 2" Released: 10 September 1990; 2. "The Tide Is Turning" Released: 19 November 1990

Professional ratings
Review scores
| Source | Rating |
|---|---|
| AllMusic | 3/5 stars |
| The Rolling Stone Album Guide | 2/5 stars |

The Wall – Live in Berlin was a live concert performance by the English rock musician Roger Waters and numerous guest artists, of Pink Floyd's eleventh studio album The Wall (1979), itself largely written by Waters during his time with the band. The show was held in Berlin on 21 July 1990, to commemorate the fall of the Berlin Wall eight months earlier. A live album of the concert was released in September 1990. A video of the concert was also commercially released.

== History ==
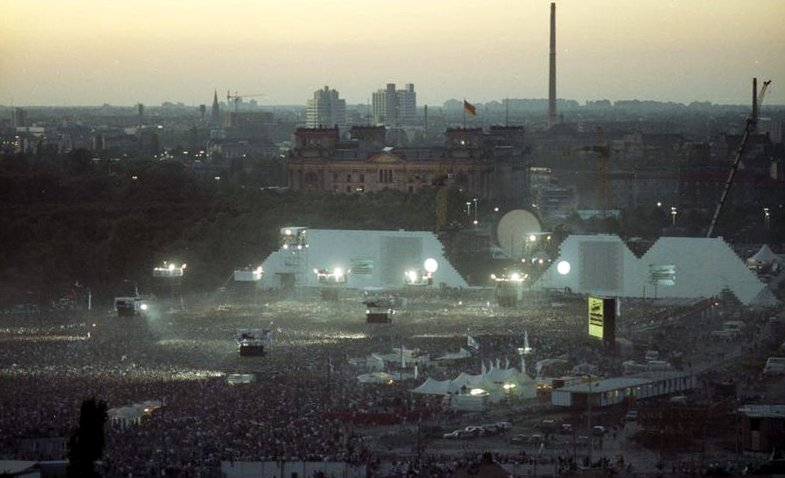
The concert at a strip of land between the Brandenburg Gate and Leipziger Platz

The concert was staged on vacant terrain between Potsdamer Platz and the Brandenburg Gate, a location that was part of the former "no man's land" of the Berlin Wall.

"I did an interview a couple of years ago for a guy called Redbeard…" Waters recalled. "He said, 'Would you ever perform The Wall again on stage?' And I said, 'No'… Indoors, it made no sense financially; it's too expensive. And, as it's partially an attack on the inherently greedy nature of stadium rock shows, it would be wrong to do it in stadiums… I said, 'Well, I might do it outdoors if they ever take the wall down in Berlin.'… The Memorial Fund was in a council meeting, and felt they needed some kind of an event to focus attention on it… So I agreed to have a meeting with Leonard Cheshire. And I was very impressed, and said I would do what I could, although I thought it was very unlikely that it would come off… Then, in November [1989], when the wall started coming down, we started negotiating."

The concert arena overlaid on a 2024 map. ‡ = stage.

The event was produced and cast by British impresario and producer Tony Hollingsworth. It was staged partly at Waters' expense. While he subsequently earned the money back from the sale of the CD and video releases of the album, the original plan was to donate all profits past his initial investment to the Memorial Fund for Disaster Relief, a UK charity founded by Leonard Cheshire. However, audio and video sales came in significantly under projections, and the trading arm of the charity (Operation Dinghy) incurred heavy losses. A few years later, the charity was wound up, and the audio and video sales rights from the concert performance returned to Waters.

The production was designed by Mark Fisher and Jonathan Park. The stage design featured a 550-foot-long (170 m) and 82-foot-high (25 m) wall. Most of the wall was built before the show and the rest was built progressively through the first part of the show. The wall was then knocked down at the end of the show.

Waters tried to get guests like Peter Gabriel, Bruce Springsteen and Eric Clapton but they were either unavailable or turned it down. Rod Stewart, who was to sing "Young Lust", and Joe Cocker were confirmed but, when the planned concert date was put back, both were unavailable. "To sell the idea to TV, I had to get people to commit themselves and it very nearly killed me," Waters recalled. "The likes of Joni Mitchell and Bryan Adams were prepared to say 'Yes' from the start, but there were so many others who were just waiting to see who else was involved before they made up their minds."

In the 1989 interview with Redbeard, Waters stated, "I might even let Dave play guitar." On 30 June 1990 – during an interview before Pink Floyd's performance at Knebworth '90 – Gilmour responded to Roger's statement on an interview with Kurt Loder on MTV by saying that he "and the rest of Pink Floyd (Nick Mason and Rick Wright) had been given the legal go-ahead to perform with Roger but had not been contacted" and "he never asked us" (in a fake crying voice) with Nick Mason saying "if only that phone can ring". Two days later, on 2 July 1990 Waters appeared on the American rock radio call-in show Rockline and contradicted his Gilmour invite by saying, "I don't know where Dave got that idea".

In the end, Hollingsworth (with Waters assisting) brought in guest artists including Snowy White, Rick Danko, Levon Helm and Garth Hudson of The Band, The Hooters, Van Morrison, Sinéad O'Connor, Cyndi Lauper, Marianne Faithfull, Scorpions, Joni Mitchell, Paul Carrack, Thomas Dolby and Bryan Adams, along with actors Albert Finney, Jerry Hall, Tim Curry and Ute Lemper. Leonard Cheshire opened the concert by blowing a World War I whistle.

This performance had several differences from Pink Floyd's original production of The Wall show. Both "Mother" and "Another Brick in the Wall, Part II" (like in the 1980/81 concerts) were extended with solos by various instruments and the latter had a cold ending. "In The Flesh" (also like the 1980/81 concerts) has an extended intro, and "Comfortably Numb" featured dueling solos by the two guitarists as well as an additional chorus at the end of the song. "The Show Must Go On" is omitted completely, while both "The Last Few Bricks" and "What Shall We Do Now?" are included. Also, the performance of the song "The Trial" had live actors playing the parts, with Thomas Dolby playing the part of the teacher hanging from the wall, Tim Curry as the prosecutor and Albert Finney as the Judge. The repeated proclamation of "Tear down the wall!" and subsequent destruction of the on-stage wall was for this show accompanied by a projection of a section of the actual Berlin Wall on the styrofoam bricks used on stage. The show officially ended with "The Tide Is Turning", a song from Waters' then-recent solo album Radio K.A.O.S. The Wall's original closing number, "Outside the Wall," was affixed to the end of "The Tide is Turning."

The Wall – Live in Berlin was released as a live recording of the concert, and as a Laserdisc video in NTSC format. A DVD was released in 2003 in the U.S. by Island/Mercury Records and internationally (region-free) by Universal Music.

A single ""Another Brick In The Wall, part two", with ""Run Like Hell (Potsdamer Mix)" was also released. The techno-style Potsdamer Mix was by Mark Plati.

Hollingsworth's company Tribute, a London-based "good causes" campaign company, sold worldwide television rights, with 52 countries showing the two-hour event. Twenty countries showed up to five repeats of the show and 65 countries broadcast a highlights show. There was also distribution of a double music CD and post-production VHS videotape by PolyGram.

== Setlist ==
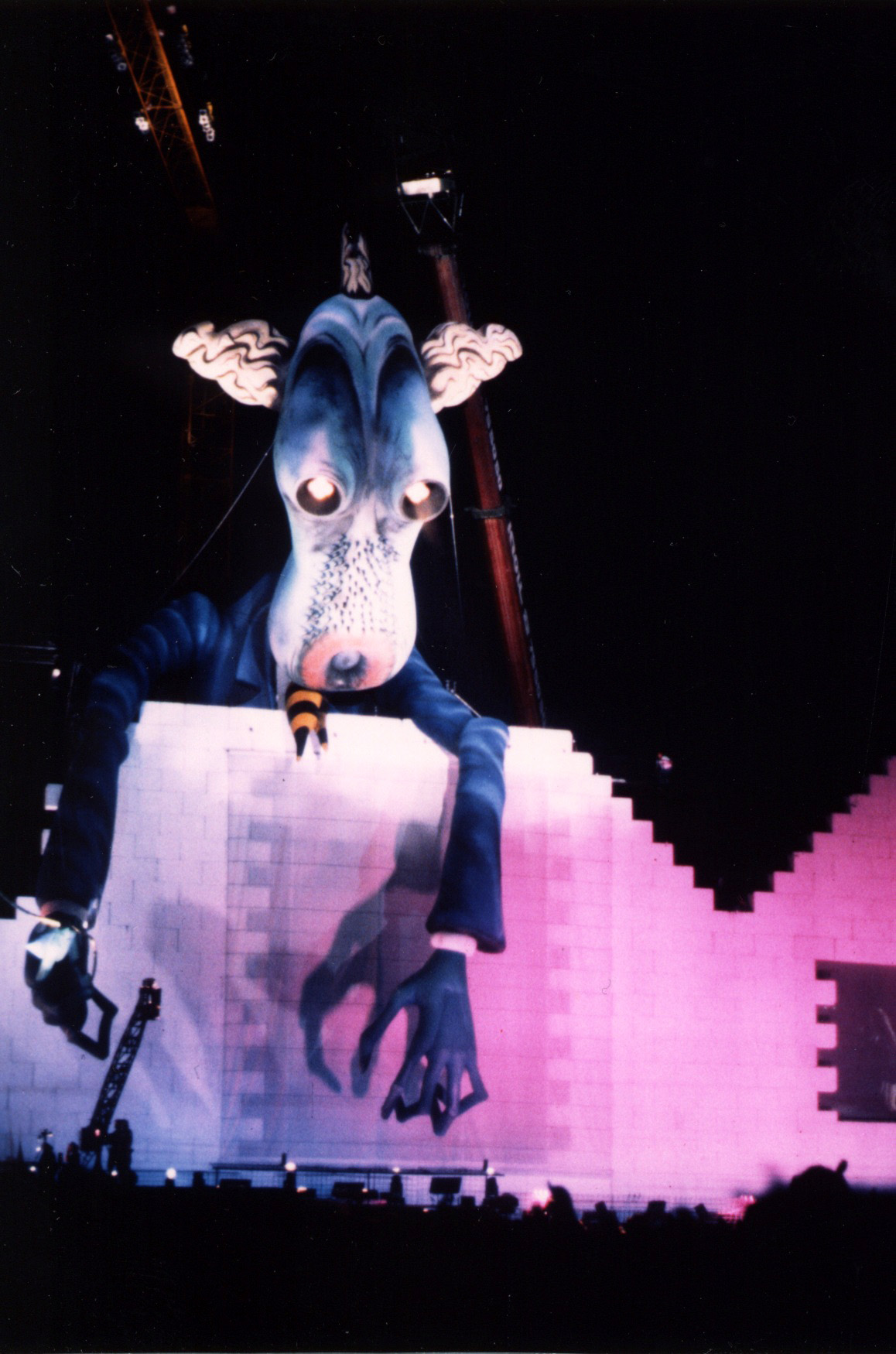
The schoolmaster puppet

All tracks written or co-written by Roger Waters.

Tracks 9, 14, 21, and 23, co-written by David Gilmour.

Track 26, co-written by Bob Ezrin.

| Track title | Performing artists | Notes |
|---|---|---|
| 1. "In the Flesh?" | Scorpions | |
| 2. "The Thin Ice" | Ute Lemper & Roger Waters and the Rundfunk Orchestra & Choir | |
| 3. "Another Brick in the Wall (Part 1)" | Roger Waters | Soprano sax solo by Garth Hudson |
| 4. "The Happiest Days of Our Lives" | Roger Waters | |
| 5. "Another Brick in the Wall (Part 2)" | Cyndi Lauper | Guitar solos by Rick Di Fonzo and Snowy White, organ solo by Nick Glennie-Smith, keytar solo by Thomas Dolby |
| 6. "Mother" | Sinéad O'Connor and the Band | Accordion by Garth Hudson, vocals by Rick Danko and Levon Helm; acoustic instruments by the Hooters |
| 7. "Goodbye Blue Sky" | Joni Mitchell and the Rundfunk Orchestra & Choir | Flute by James Galway |
| 8. "What Shall We Do Now?" | Bryan Adams, Roger Waters and the Rundfunk Orchestra & Choir | Listed as "Empty Spaces", but in reality is the similar sounding outtake from the album "What Shall We Do Now?" |
| 9. "Young Lust" | Bryan Adams | Guitar solos by Rick Di Fonzo and Snowy White |
| 10. "Oh My God – What a Fabulous Room" | Jerry Hall | Intro to "One of My Turns" |
| 11. "One of My Turns" | Roger Waters | |
| 12. "Don't Leave Me Now" | Roger Waters | |
| 13. "Another Brick in the Wall (Part 3)" | Roger Waters and the Rundfunk Orchestra & Choir | |
| 14. "The Last Few Bricks" | Roger Waters | |
| 15. "Goodbye Cruel World" | Roger Waters | |
| 16. "Hey You" | Paul Carrack | |
| 17. "Is There Anybody Out There?" | The Rundfunk Orchestra & Choir | Classical guitars by Rick Di Fonzo and Snowy White |
| 18. "Nobody Home" | Roger Waters and the Rundfunk Orchestra & Choir | Guitar solos by Snowy White |
| 19. "Vera" | Roger Waters and the Rundfunk Orchestra & Choir | |
| 20. "Bring the Boys Back Home" | The Rundfunk Orchestra & Choir, Band of the Combined Soviet Forces in Germany and Red Army Chorus | |
| 21. "Comfortably Numb" | Van Morrison, Roger Waters, the Band, and the Rundfunk Orchestra & Choir | Guitar solos by Rick Di Fonzo and Snowy White |
| 22. "In the Flesh" | Roger Waters, Scorpions, and the Rundfunk Orchestra & Choir | |
| 23. "Run Like Hell" | Roger Waters and Scorpions | |
| 24. "Waiting for the Worms" | Roger Waters, Scorpions and the Rundfunk Orchestra & Choir | |
| 25. "Stop" | Roger Waters | |
| 26. "The Trial" | The Rundfunk Orchestra & Choir, featuring: Tim Curry as the Prosecutor; Thomas Dolby as the Schoolmaster; Ute Lemper as the Wife; Marianne Faithfull as the Mother; Albert Finney as the Judge | |
| 27. "The Tide Is Turning (After Live Aid)" | The Company (lead vocals by Roger Waters, Joni Mitchell, Cyndi Lauper, Bryan Adams, Van Morrison and Paul Carrack) and the Rundfunk Orchestra & Choir. | |
| 28. "Outside the Wall" | Roger Waters | Excluded from CD and vinyl releases |

== Personnel ==
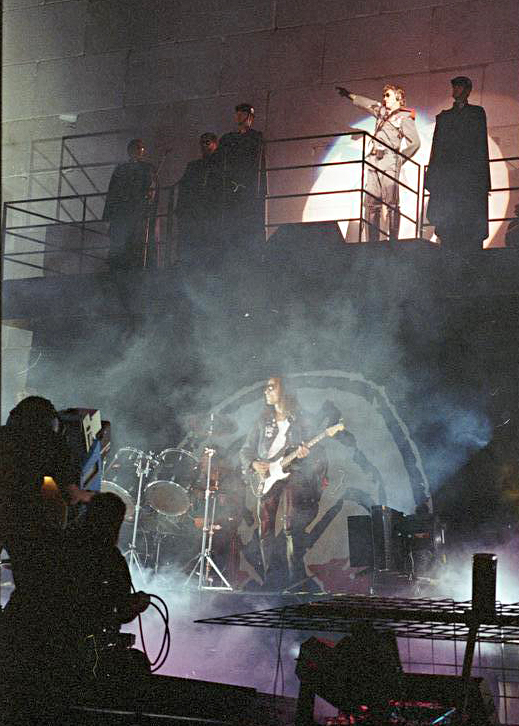
Roger Waters (spotlit) on stage

=== The Company ===
- Roger Waters – vocals, bass guitar, acoustic guitar on "Mother", rhythm guitar on "Hey You"
- Scorpions:
  - Klaus Meine – lead vocals, tambourine
  - Rudolf Schenker – rhythm guitar, backing vocals
  - Matthias Jabs – lead guitar, backing vocals
  - Francis Buchholz – bass guitar, backing vocals
  - Herman Rarebell – drums, backing vocals
- Ute Lemper – vocals
- Cyndi Lauper – vocals
- Thomas Dolby – keytar, vocals
- Sinéad O'Connor – vocals
- The Band:
  - Rick Danko – vocals
  - Levon Helm – vocals
  - Garth Hudson – accordion, soprano saxophone
- The Hooters:
  - Eric Bazilian – guitar, vocals
  - Rob Hyman – keyboards, vocals
  - John Lilley – guitar, vocals
  - Fran Smith Jr. – bass guitar, vocals
  - David Uosikkinen – drums
- Joni Mitchell – vocals
- James Galway – flute
- Bryan Adams – guitar, vocals
- Jerry Hall – vocals
- Paul Carrack – vocals
- Van Morrison – vocals
- Tim Curry – vocals
- Marianne Faithfull – vocals
- Albert Finney – vocals

=== The Bleeding Heart Band ===
- Rick Di Fonzo – guitars
- Snowy White – guitars
- Andy Fairweather-Low – bass guitar, guitar, backing vocals
- Peter Wood – keyboards, organ, synthesizers
- Nick Glennie-Smith – keyboards, organ, synthesizers
- Graham Broad – drums, electronic percussion
- Stan Farber – backing vocals, percussion (credited as Jim Farber)
- Joe Chemay – backing vocals
- Jim Haas – backing vocals, percussion
- John Joyce – backing vocals

=== Others ===
- The Rundfunk Orchestra, directed by Michael Kamen.
- The Rundfunk Choir.
- The Marching Band of the Combined Soviet Forces in Germany (alternatingly credited on the 2003 reissue DVD as The Military Orchestra of the Soviet Army) and the Red Army Chorus.
- Paddy Moloney (member of The Chieftains. Listed in album credits, contribution was the tin whistle playing throughout the concert.)

== Performance notes ==
- The recording of "Mother" in the audio and video versions of the concert is taken from a rehearsal. The live broadcast was plagued with technical difficulties.
- The Wife's part of "The Trial" was reshot at London's Brixton Academy after the original sequence was deemed to be of insufficient quality due to camera shake. What is seen in the video issue is a close-up of Ute Lemper, shot against a dark background, lip-syncing to the original live sound.
- Since the concert was to take place on Potsdamer Platz, the no-man's land between East and West Berlin, the producers did not know if the area would be filled with mines. Before setting up, they did a sweep of the area and found a cache of munitions and a previously unknown SS Leibstandarte Adolf Hitler bunker.
- The live Van Morrison version of "Comfortably Numb" is used in the Martin Scorsese film The Departed. It is later used in HBO's The Sopranos. Morrison also performed this version in his 2008 concerts.

== Charts ==
Weekly chart performance for The Wall – Live in Berlin
| Chart (1990) | Peak position |
|---|---|
| Australian Albums Chart | 10 |
| Austrian Albums Chart | 25 |
| Canadian RPM Albums Chart | 12 |
| Dutch Albums Chart | 15 |
| French Albums Chart | 6 |
| German Albums Chart | 10 |
| New Zealand Albums Chart | 4 |
| Norwegian Albums Chart | 17 |
| Portuguese Album Chart | 2 |
| Swedish Albums Chart | 34 |
| Swiss Albums Chart | 11 |
| UK Albums Chart | 27 |
| US Billboard 200 | 56 |

1990 year-end chart performance for The Wall – Live in Berlin
| Chart | Position |
|---|---|
| Canadian Albums Chart | 57 |
| European Albums Chart | 100 |

== Certifications ==
=== Video ===
Certifications for The Wall – Live in Berlin
| Region | Certification | Certified units/sales |
|---|---|---|
| Argentina (CAPIF) | Platinum | 8,000^{^} |
| Australia (ARIA) | Platinum | 15,000^{^} |
| Brazil (Pro-Música Brasil) | Gold | 25,000^{*} |
| France (SNEP) | Gold | 10,000^{*} |
| Mexico (AMPROFON) | Platinum | 20,000^{^} |
| New Zealand (RMNZ) | Gold | 2,500^{^} |
| Switzerland (IFPI Switzerland) | Gold | 3,000^{^} |
| United Kingdom (BPI) | Platinum | 50,000^{*} |
| United States (RIAA) | Platinum | 100,000^{^} |
^{*} Sales figures based on certification alone.^{^} Shipments figures based on certification alone.
