= The Show Must Go On (Pink Floyd song) =

1979 song by Pink Floyd

Song by Pink Floyd

from the album The Wall
- Released: 30 November 1979
- Recorded: April – November 1979
- Genre: Art rock; progressive rock
- Length: 1:36
- Label: Harvest (UK); Columbia (US)
- Songwriter: Roger Waters
- Producers: Bob Ezrin; David Gilmour; James Guthrie; Roger Waters

Official audio
- "The Show Must Go On" on YouTube

"The Show Must Go On" (working titles "Who's Sorry Now", "(It's) Never Too Late") is a song by the English rock band Pink Floyd, from their eleventh studio album The Wall (1979). It was written by Roger Waters and sung by David Gilmour.

== Recording and lyrics ==
Roger Waters wanted to create a Beach Boys type sound for the backing vocals, and got Bruce Johnston to come and help create it. The song's chord patterns closely resemble those found in "Mother", "In the Flesh", and "Waiting for the Worms".

The track does not appear in the film version of The Wall (1982) nor in Waters' post-Pink Floyd concert The Wall – Live in Berlin (1990). It also has an extra verse that was cut from the studio album, but is included in the lyrics printed on its sleeve.

Do I have to stand up
Wild eyed in the spotlight
What a nightmare
Why don't I turn and run

After this, the line "There must be some mistake..." appears.

The full song was performed live in concert, and as such appears on Is There Anybody Out There? The Wall Live 1980–81 (2000). It was also included on Waters' 2010–2013 solo Wall tour, the concert film, and the album of that tour.

It is the only song from the album on which Waters does not perform any instrument or vocal, although his voice is on unofficially released recordings of the demo. He is singing a verse that was cut from the final version and has never been played live, located right before David Gilmour's bridge:

Am I really unsure,
Wild eyed in the spotlight?
Fuck me, what a nightmare
Who's there?
Have they all gone?

It's okay, now you're in luck,
The worms have fled the Rising Sun.
Their evil power is on the wane.
Forget the past and start again.

There must be some mistake...

== Plot ==
As with the other songs on The Wall, "The Show Must Go On" tells a segment of the story of Pink, the story's protagonist. This song leads into "In the Flesh", where the show is performed by Pink as he begins to mentally unravel and hallucinate that he is a fascist dictator.

== Personnel ==
Pink Floyd

- David Gilmour – vocals, guitars, bass guitar, roto toms
- Nick Mason – drums
- Richard Wright – Prophet-5, backing vocals

Additional musicians

- Bob Ezrin – Prophet-5, piano
- Bruce Johnston – backing vocals
- Joe Chemay – backing vocals
- Stan Farber – backing vocals
- Jim Haas – backing vocals
- John Joyce – backing vocals
- Toni Tennille – backing vocals

Personnel per Fitch and Mahon.
