= Blurred Vision =

British-based rock band

- Origin: Toronto, Ontario, Canada
- Genres: Progressive rock, psychedelic rock, art rock, pop rock
- Years active: 2010–2023
- Past members: Sepp Osley (since 2010–2023) – guitar, vocals; Sohl Osley (2010–2018) – bass; Ben Riley (2010–2018) – drums; Bentley Levy (since 2018–2023) – bass; Jake Bradford Sharp (since 2018–2023) – drums; Jake Libretto (since 2019–2023) – guitar
- Website: blurredvisionmusic.com

Blurred Vision is a British-based rock band officially formed in Toronto, Ontario, Canada, in 2010, originally consisting of Iranian-born brothers Sepp Osley (guitar and vocals), Sohl Osley (bass), and Ben Riley (drums). The group released their debut album Organized Insanity, produced by Terry Brown, through Cherry Red Records in April 2015 when Sepp Osley relocated to London, UK. In October 2018, the band announced its new lineup with the departure of original members Sohl Osley and Ben Riley, consisting of founding member Sepp Osley, Bentley Levy (bass), Jake Bradford Sharp (drums) and in 2019 the full new lineup was completed with the addition of guitarist Jake Libretto. In 2023, founding member Sepp Osley announced the end of the band in an official Instagram post and began his solo career.

== History ==
In 2010, brothers Sepp and Sohl Osley released a cover of Pink Floyd's "Another Brick In The Wall Part 2" dubbed "Hey Ayatollah Leave Those Kids Alone". Filmmaker Babak Payami produced a music video, which quickly went viral on the video-sharing platform YouTube. The remake was also publicly endorsed by Pink Floyd's Roger Waters.

Following the success of "Hey Ayatollah", producer Terry Brown contacted the brothers and introduced them to drummer Ben Riley, with whom they founded Blurred Vision.

In 2012, Blurred Vision became official ambassadors of the charity WhyHunger, joining the likes of Bruce Springsteen, Carlos Santana and Yoko Ono. Two years later, they were the only Canadian band to perform at The Beatles' 50th Anniversary Concerts in New York City.

Drummer Ben Riley and Bassist Sohl Osley left the band in August 2018. They were replaced by Bentley Levy on bass and Jake Bradford Sharp on drums, and guitarist Jake Libretto. Their second studio album is set to release in 2020.

In October 2022 in reaction to the Great wave of Iranian protests of Autumn 2022 the band published an updated clip of the ""Hey Ayatollah Leave Those Kids Alone" song, featuring scenes from these protests with women taking off their obligatory headscarfs.

== Dear John Concert for War Child ==
In 2019 the Dear John concert, put together by Sepp Osley to celebrate John Lennon's 79th birthday, took place at the Hard Rock Hotel in London. The show brought together a variety of musicians including Nick Van Eede of Cutting Crew and Steve Hogarth of Marillion, all in aid of UK charity War Child. The event and the song is now a yearly event to celebrate the music, the legacy, and birthday of the Beatle legend. The video for the song includes musicians from around the world, including Peter Gabriel, Geddy Lee, PP Arnold, Maxi Jazz, Paul Young, and many others making appearances.

The 2nd Annual Dear John Concert in Aid of War Child UK took place once again on 9 October 2020, to celebrate the 80th birthday of John Lennon. Artists including Graham Gouldman of 10cc, Larkin Poe, Lindsay Ell, PP Arnold, Nick Van Eede of Cutting Crew, Maxi Jazz of Faithless, John Illsley of Dire Straits, KT Tunstall, Mollie Marriott, Laura Jean Anderson joined Blurred Vision and performed and appearances were made by Peter Gabriel, Andy Fairweather Low and filmmaker Richard Curtis. The concert was hosted from the Hard Rock Hotel London and streamed online to viewers on the video platform YouTube.

== Studio album releases ==
Blurred Vision's debut album Organized Insanity, produced by Terry Brown was released in April 2015. It garnered considerable praise in the music press, with journalist Malcolm Dome declaring it "one of the best of 2015" and Craig Hartranft calling it a "promise of great things to come from Blurred Vision" Upon release of the album, a UK tour supporting British Rock band Uriah Heep kicked off, which saw Blurred Vision, joined by Brown, embark on a ten date run across England.

'Manhattan' (Manhattan Undying Original Motion Picture Soundtrack) was released on 3 April 2020. The album includes songs heard in the feature film plus bonus tracks that were written and recorded for the movie but not used in the final release. The film, directed by Babak Payami and starring Luke Grimes and Sarah Roemer, was released through Paramount Pictures in 2016. The album was preceded by two singles including 'Tonight Pt. 2 (Manhattan Nights)' and 'Arms Of Our World'.

'Redemption', the band's second studio album followed the release of the band's soundtrack album and was digitally released on 5 June 2020. It consists of nine original songs and was produced once again by Terry Brown. The album was released during the 2020 COVID-19 Pandemic and lockdown and preceded by a music video for the track 'What Have I Become' that featured the Powerhouse Fellowship Soul Choir, who originally appear on the album version of the song. The video was recorded in isolation as members and singers all recorded their own performances from their homes and studios.

== Discography ==
=== Albums ===
- 2015: Organized Insanity
- 2020: Manhattan (Manhattan Undying Original Motion Picture Soundtrack)
- 2020: Redemption

=== Singles ===
- 2010: "Another Brick in the Wall (Hey Ayatollah Leave Those Kids Alone)"
- 2015: "All I Wanted"
- 2015: "Dear John"
- 2017: "Democracy"
