= Empty Spaces =

Song by Pink Floyd

from the album The Wall
- Released: 30 November 1979
- Recorded: 1978–1979
- Genre: Progressive rock
- Length: 2:10 (album version); 3:55 (Is There Anybody Out There? The Wall Live 1980–81 version combined with "What Shall We Do Now?")
- Label: Harvest (UK); Columbia (US)
- Songwriter: Roger Waters
- Producers: Bob Ezrin; David Gilmour; James Guthrie; Roger Waters

"Empty Spaces" is a song by the English rock band Pink Floyd. It appears on the 1979 album The Wall. It contains a backmasked message.

== Composition ==
The song is in the key of E minor, and is two minutes, eight seconds in length. It features a long introductory section, with solo guitar and a repetitive drumbeat, and a railway station announcement. The song reaches a climax of tension, at which point Roger Waters plays a descending blues scale over the minor dominant, B minor, cueing the start of the vocals. Roger Waters sings a short verse, ending on the phrase "How shall I complete the wall?" This track shares a backing track with the first half of "What Shall We Do Now?", sped up from D minor to E minor, with new guitar and vocals. The last beat introduces the next song, "Young Lust". The original D minor version of the track has never been released, officially or otherwise.

== Plot ==
The Wall tells the story of Pink, an alienated and embittered rock star. At this point in the narrative, Pink is now grown up and married, but he and his wife are having relationship problems because of his physical distance and nearly complete emotional "wall". Pink asks himself how he should complete its construction.

== What Shall We Do Now? ==
Originally, "Empty Spaces" was intended to be much later on The Wall. Until very late in production, "Empty Spaces" was in the key of D minor, and sequenced between "Don't Leave Me Now" and "Another Brick in the Wall, Part 3", while "Goodbye Blue Sky" was followed by a similar, longer song called "What Shall We Do Now?".

The first half of "What Shall We Do Now?" shares the same slow instrumental build up and four-line verse structure as "Empty Spaces". The first verse begins with the same "What shall we use to fill the empty spaces" refrain as in "Empty Spaces", but the lyrical similarities end here. After the lyric "Shall we set out across this sea of faces / in search of more, and more applause", Nick Mason's drums kick in, and the song segues into its faster second half. This section continues for another minute or so before the song ends.

== Movie and live versions ==
On the film adaptation the song is dropped in favour of "What Shall We Do Now?". This version of "What Shall We Do Now?" is the only known release of the studio version. After the line "with our backs to the wall", the song abruptly ends cold, with the final ending beat slightly obscured by the sound effect of a window breaking, as seen in the film.

The original "Empty Spaces" has never been performed live.

On both Is There Anybody Out There? The Wall Live 1980–81 and Roger Waters: The Wall, "Empty Spaces" is once again dropped in favour of "What Shall We Do Now?", however these versions are split into two tracks: the slower first half is listed as "Empty Spaces", while the faster second half is listed as "What Shall We Do Now?". These versions of "What Shall We Do Now?" both end the same way: after the line "with our backs to the wall", the song continues for another four beats before the line "backs to the wall" repeats, and the song ends with a decelerating cold fade in concert fashion.

On Waters' The Wall – Live in Berlin, the entire track is listed as "Empty Spaces", even though it is actually "What Shall We Do Now?". Musically this version of "What Shall We Do Now?" is quite different to all other versions, featuring the Rundfunk Orchestra conducted by Michael Kamen, and additional lead guitar. Waters sings the first half as in the original, however the second half is sung by guest singer Bryan Adams. After the final line "with our backs to the wall", an extended outro led by Graham Broad's drums and a brief orchestral crescendo builds before the song ends cold.

== Hidden message ==
Directly before the lyrical section, there is a hidden message isolated on the left channel of the song. When heard normally, it appears to be nonsense. If played backwards, the following can be heard:

–Hello looker. Congratulations, You have just discovered the secret message. Please send your answer to Old Pink, care of the Funny Farm, Chalfont...
–Roger, Carolyne's on the phone!
–Okay.

Roger Waters congratulates the listener for finding this message, and jokes that they can send their answer to "Old Pink" (being either a reference to Syd Barrett, or a foreshadowing of Pink's eventual insanity), who lives in a funny farm (a term to describe a psychiatric hospital) somewhere in Chalfont. Before he can reveal the exact location, however, he gets interrupted by producer James Guthrie in the background who says Carolyne (Waters' then wife) is on the phone.

== Personnel ==
Empty Spaces

- David Gilmour – guitars, Prophet-5 and ARP Quadra synthesizers
- Roger Waters – lead vocals, bass, EMS VCS 3 synthesizer
- Richard Wright – piano

with:

- James Guthrie – ARP Quadra synthesizer

What Shall We Do Now?

- David Gilmour – guitars, Prophet-5 and ARP Quadra synthesizers
- Roger Waters – lead vocals, bass, EMS VCS 3 synthesizer
- Richard Wright – piano
- Nick Mason – drums

with:

- James Guthrie – ARP Quadra synthesizer
