= Run Like Hell =

Single by Pink Floyd

from the album The Wall
- B-side: "Don't Leave Me Now"
- Released: April 1980
- Recorded: April–November 1979
- Genre: Progressive rock; hard rock; disco
- Length: 4:20 (album version); 3:41 (single edit)
- Label: Harvest (UK); Columbia (US)
- Songwriters: David Gilmour; Roger Waters
- Producers: Bob Ezrin; David Gilmour; James Guthrie; Roger Waters

Pink Floyd singles chronology
| "Another Brick in the Wall (Part 2)" (1979) | "Run Like Hell" (1980) | "Comfortably Numb" (1980) |

Audio sample
- file; help

Audio video
- "Run Like Hell" on YouTube

"Run Like Hell" is a song by the English progressive rock band Pink Floyd, written by David Gilmour and Roger Waters. It appears on their eleventh studio album The Wall (1979) and was released as a single in 1980, reaching #15 in the Canadian singles chart and #18 in Sweden but it only reached #53 in the U.S. A 12" single of "Run Like Hell," "Don't Leave Me Now" and "Another Brick in the Wall (Part 2)" peaked at #57 on the Disco Top 100 chart in the U.S. To date, it is the last original composition written by both Gilmour and Waters, the final of such under the Pink Floyd banner and the last song recorded by all four members of the 1970s-era Floyd lineup.

== Concept ==
The song is written from the narrative point of view of antihero Pink during a hallucination in which the alienated and bitter rock star becomes a fascist dictator and turns a concert audience into an angry, violent mob.

=== Film adaptation ===
In the film adaptation, Pink directs his jackbooted thugs to attack the "riff-raff" mentioned in the previous song (In the Flesh Pt. 2), in which he ordered them to raid and destroy the homes of queers, Jews, and "coons" (a racial slur for black people). One scene depicts an interracial couple cuddling in the back seat of a car when a group of neo-Nazis accost them, beating the boy and raping the girl while the narrator sings "You better run".

The Wall director Alan Parker hired the Tilbury Skins, a skinhead gang from Essex, for a scene in which Pink's "hammer guard" (in black, militaristic uniforms designed by the film's animator, Gerald Scarfe) smashes up a Pakistani diner; Parker recalled how the action "always seemed to continue long after I had yelled out 'Cut!'."

== History ==
The music was written by David Gilmour (one of three songs on The Wall for which Gilmour is credited as a co-writer) with the lyrics by Roger Waters. Waters provides the vocals (except for Gilmour's multitracked harmonies singing "Run, run, run, run,"). The first version of the song had music written by Waters (which appears on the Immersion box set of The Wall) with the lyrics as on the album but Waters's music was scrapped in favour of Gilmour's music during the recording of the band demos (which also appear on the Immersion box set). The song features the only keyboard solo on The Wall by Richard Wright (although on live performances, "Young Lust" and "Another Brick in the Wall, Part 2" would also feature keyboard solos). After the last line of lyrics, a synthesizer solo is played over the verse sequence in place of vocals. Following the solo, the arrangement "empties out" and becomes sparse with the guitar only playing an ostinato with rhythmic echoes and brief variations every other bar. Sound effects are used to create a sense of paranoia with the sound of cruel laughter, running footsteps, car tyres skidding and a loud scream. The original 7" single version and Pink Floyd The Wall -- Special Radio Construction promotional EP both contain a clean guitar intro, without the live crowd effects. The EP version also contains an extended, 32-beat intro and an extended 64-beat outro where David Gilmour's main guitar phrase repeats before the track ends.

Gilmour said "Short and Sweet", from his eponymous debut solo studio album, was similar to "Run Like Hell" with both songs using drop-D tuning and chords based around a D root.

== Composition ==
After the previous song, "In the Flesh", the crowd continues to chant, "Pink! Floyd! Pink! Floyd!" The guitar intro begins with the scratching of strings dampened with left-hand muting, before settling on an open D string dampened by palm muting. As heard earlier on the album in "Another Brick in the Wall, Part 1", the muted D is treated with a specific delay setting, providing three to four loud but gradually decaying repeats, one dotted-eighth note apart, with the result that simply playing quarter notes (at 116 beats per minute) will produce a strict rhythm of one eighth note followed by two sixteenth notes, with rhythmic echoes overlapping. Over this pedal tone of D, Gilmour plays descending triads in D major (mostly D, A, and G), down to the open chord position (a quieter, second overdubbed guitar plays open chords only). Some of the guitar tracks are also treated with a heavy flanging effect. Gilmour has stated he was attempting to imitate the "chopping cellos" from The Beach Boys song "Good Vibrations".

The verses are in E minor, with pedal tones of the guitar's open E, B, and G strings (a full E minor triad) ringing out over a sequence of power chords, resulting in the chords E minor, Fmaj7sus2(♯11), C major seventh, and Bsus4(add♭6). Providing contrast, another guitar, equally treated with delay, plays a low-pitched riff on the roots and minor sevenths of each chord, although the E♭ (minor seventh of F) and B♭ (minor seventh of C) do not match the sustaining open E and B strings an octave above.

Aside from the added tones in each chord, the basic verse sequence of E minor, F major, E minor, C major, and B major is reprised later in "The Trial", the conceptual climax of The Wall. However, David Gilmour is not credited as a co-writer of "The Trial", which is credited to Waters and producer Bob Ezrin.

Before the final riff ends the song, a piercing shriek by Roger Waters can be heard, not unlike one heard between "The Happiest Days of Our Lives" and "Another Brick in the Wall, Part 2". At the conclusion of the song, the crowd begins chanting, "Hammer! Hammer!" as the sound of soldiers marching is heard before segueing into the next song, "Waiting for the Worms".

=== Film version ===
The movie version of the song is considerably shorter than the album version. The second guitar refrain between the first and second verses was taken out, with the verse's last line, "You better run", leading directly to Gilmour's harmonized chant ("Run, run, run, run"), which now echoed back and forth between the left and right channels. Also, Richard Wright's synth solo was superimposed over the second verse, and the long instrumental break between the end of the synth solo and Waters' scream was removed.

== Critical reception ==
Billboard felt that the lyrics were not as "biting" as Pink Floyd's previous single "Another Brick in the Wall, Part 2," but stated that "it's the driving, dance-oriented, percussion-filled rhythm which makes the song come alive." In 2017, they ranked the song number two on their list of the 50 greatest Pink Floyd songs. Cashbox said that "David Gilmour’s hard bitten guitar and Roger Waters' incessant bass beat set the perfect instrumental mood for the lyrical paranoia." Record World said that "a barrage of guitar/keyboard waves pound the dance-oriented rock" in this example of "brilliance from The Wall." Ultimate Classic Rock critic Michael Gallucci rated it as the 7th best Roger Waters song with Pink Floyd, calling it "a paranoid and drug-fueled riff on the dangers of stardom and its parallels with fascism."

== Live performances ==
=== Pink Floyd ===
==== The Wall Tour ====
During the previous song, "In the Flesh", a giant inflatable pig was released, which Waters refers to in a speech between both songs. The speech given varied slightly at each concert and therefore can be used to identify which show a recording came from. On Is There Anybody Out There? The Wall Live 1980–81, the speech is a mix of the 15 June 1981 and 17 June 1981 speeches. It was sometimes introduced by Waters as "Run Like Fuck" and Waters and Gilmour sang alternating lines, while the vocal quartet of Stan Farber, Jim Haas, Joe Chemay, and John Joyce sang the choral part.

During the song, the "surrogate band" (also referred to, in Nick Mason's book, as the "shadow band") are onstage with the Pink Floyd members and their quartet of singers. Both Andy Bown and Roger Waters play bass on this song. Bown plays the bass exactly as it was recorded—four quarter notes per bar, playing only roots, using the lowest possible root in drop D tuning. Waters, meanwhile, plays variations at key moments, plays whole notes while singing, and, during the "emptied out" section on D following the synth solo, Waters sometimes improvised high-pitched riffs above Bown's low D.

==== Later tours ====
Following Waters' departure from Pink Floyd, the song became a regular number in the band's concerts, usually ending the show and going over nine minutes long. During their A Momentary Lapse of Reason Tour, the band recorded live renditions of the song. One live version was used as the B-side to "On the Turning Away", while it was the closing track on the live album Delicate Sound of Thunder (1988), recorded during the tour. Gilmour generally played an extended guitar introduction, sharing vocals with touring bassist Guy Pratt, with Pratt singing Waters' lines. In the Division Bell Tour, Pratt sometimes sang the name of the city where they were playing instead of the word "mother" in the line "...they're going to send you back to mother in a cardboard box..." – in the Earls Court concerts that closed the tour, he sings "London", as chronicled on the Pulse video and album. According to Phil Taylor, David Gilmour played "Run Like Hell" on a Fender Telecaster guitar tuned to a drop-D on the tour.

=== Roger Waters ===
In Roger Waters' The Wall concert in Berlin in 1990, he made no speech and sang all the lines alone. He did not play the bass guitar for this live version.

For Waters' The Wall Live concert series (2010–2013), the song was transposed one whole step down, from D to C. This is commonly done in live performances when a singer has difficulty reaching the highest notes in the song's original key. During the intro, Waters clapped to the beat and in some cases shouted, exhorting the audience to clap along and "have a good time, enjoy yourselves". Again, he did not play bass guitar, instead gesturing with a prop submachine gun at various points, a performance he repeated during This Is Not a Drill (2022–2023).

=== David Gilmour ===
In addition to performing the song with Pink Floyd, Gilmour has performed it on his 1984 solo tour in support of his About Face album. In Waters' absence, Gilmour would trade lines with bass guitarist Mickey Feat. He also performed the song solo at the Colombian Volcano benefit concert in 1986, trading lines with house-band keyboardist John "Rabbit" Bundrick (who later played on Waters' solo album, Amused to Death) and again during his 2015–2016 Rattle That Lock Tour, trading lines with Guy Pratt as documented on the 2017 Live at Pompeii album and film, which was also released as the third single to promote the release. Gilmour didn't play the song on his next tour supporting his album Luck and Strange in 2024, stating; "I love Run Like Hell. [...] But all that ‘You’d better run, run, run'. I now find that all rather, I don’t know... a bit terrifying and violent."

== Personnel ==
Pink Floyd

- Roger Waters – lead vocal, laughter, screaming, panting
- David Gilmour – guitars, bass guitar, backwards cymbals, backing vocals
- Nick Mason – drums
- Richard Wright – Prophet-5 synthesiser

with:

- James Guthrie – backwards cymbals, running, panting
- Bobbye Hall – congas, bongos
- Phil Taylor – tire screeching

Personnel per Fitch and Mahon.

Hired-gun guitarist Lee Ritenour was also brought in "to beef up the sound" by producer Bob Ezrin.

== Charts ==
| Chart (1980) | Peak position |
|---|---|
| Canada Top Singles (RPM) | 15 |
| West Germany (GfK) | 46 |
| New Zealand (Recorded Music NZ) | 30 |
| Sweden (Sverigetopplistan) | 18 |
| US Billboard Hot 100 | 53 |

== Certifications ==
| Region | Certification | Certified units/sales |
|---|---|---|
| New Zealand (RMNZ) | Gold | 15,000^{‡} |
^{‡} Sales+streaming figures based on certification alone.

== Cover versions ==
- In 2001, the Canadian all-female metal band Kittie recorded a cover which was released on their second studio album Oracle. This version incorporates the title of the song within the lyrics.
- On 6 March 2019, American heavy metal band Metallica bassist Robert Trujillo and guitarist Kirk Hammett jammed on the song during a concert in Kansas City, Missouri. The moment was recorded and uploaded to the band's YouTube channel the next day.
