= Stop (Pink Floyd song) =

Song by Pink Floyd

from the album The Wall
- Released: 30 November 1979
- Recorded: April–November 1979
- Genre: Art rock
- Length: 0:30
- Label: Harvest (UK); Columbia (US)/Capitol (US)
- Songwriter: Roger Waters
- Producers: Bob Ezrin; David Gilmour; James Guthrie; Roger Waters

"Stop" is a song from the 1979 Pink Floyd album, The Wall. It was written by Roger Waters. At only 30 seconds in length, it is Pink Floyd’s shortest song in their catalogue.

== Film version ==
After "Waiting for the Worms", Pink screams out "stop". He is seen sitting at the bottom of a bathroom stall. He seems to be reading the lyrics from a sheet of paper, which a few of the lines on come from, at the time, unreleased material written by Waters. The line "Do you remember me / How we used to be / Do you think we should be closer?", comes from "Your Possible Pasts". Other lines come from "5:11AM (The Moment of Clarity)". As Pink finishes the lyrics to "Stop", the security guard seen in the segment for "Young Lust" slowly pushes open the stall door, which leads to the animated intro of "The Trial".

== Personnel ==
- Roger Waters – vocals
- Bob Ezrin – piano
