= Vera (song) =

Song by Pink Floyd

from the album The Wall
- Released: 30 November 1979
- Recorded: April–November 1979
- Genre: Art rock
- Length: 1:35
- Label: Harvest (UK); Columbia (US)
- Songwriter: Roger Waters
- Producers: Bob Ezrin; David Gilmour; James Guthrie; Roger Waters

Official audio
- "Vera" on YouTube

"Vera" is a song by the English rock band Pink Floyd that appears on their eleventh studio album, The Wall (1979).

== Title ==
The title is a reference to Vera Lynn, an English singer and entertainer whose musical recordings and performances were very popular during the Second World War, with a popular song being 1939's "We'll Meet Again", that's referenced in this song.

The song's intro features a collage of superimposed audio excerpts from the British war film Battle of Britain (1969). Among the used clips are a piece of dialogue ("Where the hell are you, Simon?"), a BBC broadcast and battle sound effects.

== Personnel ==
Pink Floyd

- Roger Waters – vocals, acoustic guitar
- David Gilmour – acoustic guitar, bass guitar
- Richard Wright – Prophet-5 synthesiser

with:

- The New York Symphony Orchestra

Personnel per Fitch and Mahon.

== See also ==
- List of anti-war songs
