= Goodbye Cruel World (Pink Floyd song) =

Song by Pink Floyd

from the album The Wall
- Published: Pink Floyd Music Publishers Ltd
- Released: 30 November 1979 (UK); 8 December 1979 (US)
- Recorded: April – November 1979
- Genre: Progressive rock
- Length: 1:16
- Label: Harvest (UK); Columbia (US)
- Songwriter: Roger Waters
- Producers: Bob Ezrin, David Gilmour, James Guthrie, Roger Waters

"Goodbye Cruel World" is a song by Pink Floyd. It appears on their 1979 double album, The Wall.

== Composition ==
A quiet song, the Prophet-5 analog synthesiser provides the D major chord sequence: D, G, D, A, D, while the bass guitar plays the root notes and their octaves. A similar bass riff was used in the earlier Pink Floyd songs "Careful with That Axe, Eugene" and the fade-out of "See Emily Play".

== Plot ==
As with all tracks on The Wall, "Goodbye Cruel World" relates to the listener a segment of Pink's (the album's protagonist) story. More specifically, this song expresses Pink's recognition of the completion of his mental wall, and acknowledgement of his thorough isolation from society.

== Live versions ==
In all performances of The Wall, both by Pink Floyd and in Roger Waters' solo career, the song represents the end of the first half of the show. The wall is built, apart from one brick. Waters appears in this small gap and as he sings the final word, "goodbye", the last brick is put into place, ending the first half of the show.

== Personnel ==
- Roger Waters – bass guitar, vocals
- Richard Wright – Prophet-5 synthesizer, organ

Personnel per Fitch and Mahon.

== Cover versions ==
- Anathema covered the song for the re-release of their album, Alternative 4.
- Korn's cover of "Another Brick in the Wall" on their album Greatest Hits Volume 1 includes this song at the end.
- Noel Gallagher of Oasis covered the song in 1995 as a guest of an American radio station.
- Musician Orlando Francisco Garcia performs an acoustic version of this song.
