= Don't Leave Me Now (Pink Floyd song) =

- B-side of "Run Like Hell"

Single by Pink Floyd

from the album The Wall
- A-side: "Run Like Hell"
- Released: 30 November 1979
- Recorded: April–November 1979
- Genre: Progressive rock
- Length: 4:08
- Label: Harvest (UK); Columbia (US)
- Songwriter: Roger Waters
- Producers: Bob Ezrin; David Gilmour; James Guthrie; Roger Waters

"Don't Leave Me Now" is a song by the English rock band Pink Floyd. It appears on The Wall album (1979) and was released as a B-side on the single of "Run Like Hell". A 12" single of "Run Like Hell," "Don't Leave Me Now" and "Another Brick in the Wall (Part 2)" peaked at #57 on the Disco Top 100 chart in the U.S.

== Composition ==
The main section of "Don't Leave Me Now", recorded with synthesizer bass, organ, piano, and a delay-treated guitar, does not adhere to one single key, but rather cycles slowly through four dissonant and seemingly-unrelated chords, for two measures of each: An E augmented chord, followed by a D flat major seventh chord, a B flat dominant seventh chord with a suspended second, followed by a G Major chord, which, after one bar, augments its fifth, before returning to the beginning of the progression. The first three chords all sustain the notes G♯/A♭ and C, and this interval is then lowered chromatically by one semitone for the conclusion on G Major. Furthermore, the roots of this chord progression (E, D♭, B♭, and G) outline the intervals of a diminished seventh chord. The roots relate to each other as a pair of tritones - the E and B♭ form one tritone, and the D♭ and G form the other. Musicologist and author Phil Rose described this section of the song as "entirely non-functional harmonically" and stated that "[M]ost of the time when a phrase ends, Waters is either singing one of the most dissonant notes in the accompanying chord, or a non-chord tone." There is no percussion, and the tempo is very slow.

In the second section, drums, bass, and guitar enter, and the music becomes more consonant, resolving to the key of A minor through the use of D and A suspended second chords, as David Gilmour sings a refrain of "Ooh, babe".

== Plot ==
The Wall tells the story of Pink, an alienated and embittered rock star. At this point in the album's narrative, Pink has discovered his wife's infidelity. He invites a groupie to his hotel room in L.A., during his American tour and destroys the hotel room in a fit of rage, scaring the groupie away. Pink then falls into a depression afterwards. Despite the dysfunctionality of the marriage, he listlessly pleads with his wife not to leave him, stating "I need you, babe / To put through the shredder in front of my friends".

Waters, in a 1980 interview with Jim Ladd, described this song as being about "two people who have treated each other very badly", yet are devastated at the prospect of their relationship ending. He also stated during the 1992 US radio special Pink Floyd: The 25th Anniversary Special that the lyrics had nothing to do with his personal life, as he had a more cordial relationship with his wife in real life than Pink did.

=== Film version ===
The song begins with a close-up of the debris in Pink's hotel room, then switches over to the hotel's pool, where Pink is seen floating in a crucifix position. Having cut open his right hand during his violent outburst, his blood stains the pool water. What follows is a fantasy sequence in which Pink watches The Dam Busters on TV in a much larger, and entirely empty, hotel room. The shadow of Pink's wife emerges on the back wall before materialising into a praying mantis-like monster, which then transforms into the vulva-shaped flower from "What Shall We Do Now?". The song ends with Pink cowering in the corner of the room, tortured by both the imaginary mantis in front of him, and thoughts of his wife's adultery.

== Personnel ==
- Roger Waters – EMS VCS 3 synthesizer, lead vocals (verses), harmony vocals (outro segment)
- David Gilmour – guitars, bass guitar, lead vocals (outro segment), breathing
- Richard Wright – bass pedals, Hammond organ, piano, Prophet-5 synthesizer
- Nick Mason – drums

Personnel per Fitch and Mahon.
