= The Happiest Days of Our Lives =

Song by Pink Floyd

from the album The Wall
- Released: 30 November 1979
- Recorded: April–November 1979
- Genre: Progressive rock
- Length: 1:51
- Label: Harvest (UK); Columbia (US)
- Songwriter: Roger Waters
- Producers: Bob Ezrin; David Gilmour; James Guthrie; Roger Waters

Official audio
- "The Happiest Days of Our Lives" on YouTube

"The Happiest Days of Our Lives" is a song by the English rock band Pink Floyd. It appeared on their eleventh studio album The Wall (1979).

== Composition ==
The song is approximately one minute, 46 seconds in length, beginning with 24 seconds of a helicopter sound effect, followed by the schoolmaster shouting, "You! Yes, you! Stand still, laddie!" performed by Roger Waters. Waters's lead vocal is treated with a reverse echo. The song features an electric guitar with an added delay effect and an electric bass guitar playing staccato punctuations of the chordal root notes. The bass and guitar figure heard during the verses, G to A, is similar to the one in "Waiting for the Worms", a song that appears much later in the album. During the transition to "Another Brick in the Wall, Part 2", the key shifts from D minor to the relative major, F major, with dramatic drum rolls and harmony vocals.

The helicopter sound effects were captured by audio engineer and record producer Jack Douglas on location at Edwards Air Force Base in California. Douglas explains, "One of the guys in the band, I can't recall which, maybe it was [David] Gilmour, asked if I could do them a favor and go to this Air Force base in the desert and record some helicopters and jet fighters. So I headed to Edwards Air Force Base. When we told them we were doing it for Pink Floyd, they let us do whatever we wanted."

On the album, "The Happiest Days of Our Lives" segues into "Another Brick in the Wall, Part 2" with a loud, high-pitched scream by Waters, similar to one of the band's earlier works: "Careful with That Axe, Eugene". Because of this segue, many radio stations play one right after the other, and subsequent Floyd compilation albums (both Echoes and A Foot in the Door) use this song as the extended intro to "Another Brick in the Wall".

In the film based on the album, the sound at the beginning of the song is depicted as coming from a train entering a large tunnel, rather than a helicopter, as heard on the album. According to Gerald Scarfe, there was supposed to be a puppet of the teacher at the end of the tunnel in the film. Alan Parker made shots of it, but it didn't work out, so they used the Scottish actor Alex McAvoy, who played the schoolteacher, to do the scene instead. Before the cut in the middle for the Schoolmaster to mock Pink, somewhat quiet hysterical laughter is heard, extremely similar to the Schoolmaster's voice. Additionally, the song is slightly faster, and the bass guitar is noticeably louder compared to the album version.

== Plot ==
The Wall tells the story of Pink, an embittered and alienated rock star in retreat from society and personal relationships. "The Happiest Days of Our Lives" concerns Pink's youth, attending a school run by strict and often violent teachers who treat the pupils with contempt.

According to Waters, the lyrics were a reflection of his own negative experience in school. He described this in an interview with Tommy Vance of BBC Radio 1.

== Film version ==
Pink and his two friends go down to a railway track to lay bullets on the rails and watch them explode under the passing train. Pink, putting himself up against the tunnel wall, sees that the train cars are packed with faceless people. He sees his teacher at the other end of the tunnel yelling at him to stand still. In the next scene, in Pink's school, the teacher discovers Pink writing a poem (which contains lyrics from "Money") and, as punishment, ridicules Pink by reading his poem out loud to the entire class then slaps his left hand with a ruler. The schoolmaster then instructs the definition of an acre - technically correct, but absolutely useless - to the pupils by rote learning. The following scene shows the Schoolmaster in his own home, being forced to eat a piece of tough meat during dinner at his wife's silent command. To relieve himself of his humiliation, the teacher spanks a child with a belt the next day. Immediately after this comes "Another Brick in the Wall, Part 2".

== Personnel ==
Pink Floyd

- Roger Waters – bass guitar, lead vocals, backing vocals, background laughter, voice of schoolmaster
- David Gilmour – guitars
- Richard Wright – clavinet, synthesiser, Hammond organ
- Nick Mason – toms, floor tom, snare and kick drum

with:

- James Guthrie – hi-hat and choke cymbal

Personnel per Fitch and Mahon.
