= James Guthrie (music producer) =

- Born: James K. A. Guthrie; 14 November 1953 (age 72); Edmonton, Middlesex, England
- Genres: Rock
- Occupations: Audio engineer; record producer; composer; filmmaker; photographer; musician
- Instrument: Guitar
- Years active: 1973–present

James K. A. Guthrie (born 14 November 1953) is an English recording engineer and record producer best known for his work with the progressive rock band Pink Floyd serving as a producer and engineer for the band since 1978. He is the owner and operator of das boot recording in Lake Tahoe, California. He is married to Melissa Kathryn (Braun) Guthrie and owns two cats, Bert & Jack.

== Early years ==
Guthrie began his career on 1 October 1973 at Mayfair Studios (in the previous location of 64 South Molton Street) in London, as a trainee tape operator and later assistant engineer, initially trained by studio owner John Hudson. A year later he moved to Audio International studios, working under Richard Millard. His earliest credits are as an assistant engineer on the first two albums by glam rock singer Alvin Stardust. During this time he first worked with Greg Walsh (who would later go on to produce Heaven 17 and Tina Turner among others), whom Guthrie asked to join his FOH production team for the live performances of Pink Floyd's The Wall in 1980 and 1981. By 1976 Guthrie was employed as one of the engineering team at Utopia Studios which also included John Mackswith and Ian Cooper. During his tenure he worked as the engineer on The Bay City Rollers' Wouldn't You Like It? release (produced by studio owner Phil Wainman), and for producer Barry Blue on Breakout by The Dead End Kids as well as the first two albums for London-based R&B band Heatwave (Too Hot To Handle and Central Heating), which would yield the hit singles "Boogie Nights", "Always and Forever" and "The Groove Line". Utopia was also where he first worked with Andy Jackson (Jackson apprenticed as an assistant engineer under Guthrie's supervision), whom Guthrie later introduced to Pink Floyd and was hired as the band's primary engineer (a position Jackson still holds, as the Senior Mastering Engineer for David Gilmour's studio Astoria UK). In addition, Guthrie is also credited with suggesting Jon Carin as a keyboard player for Roger Waters' touring band (making Carin one of a select group of people to have played with both Waters and Gilmour, and an incarnation of Pink Floyd), and arranged for Kashmir lead vocalist and guitarist Kasper Eistrup to audition for the same tour (as documented in the film Rocket Brothers), as well as introducing vocalist Rachel Brennock (his then-girlfriend, who used the stage name Rachel Fury) to Pink Floyd, she joined the touring band from 1987 to 1989.

Guthrie later worked at other London-area studios such as The Manor, Advision, and Britannia Row. His initial producer credits would be for singer-songwriter Arlen Greene (co-producing the song "The Jazz Pianist" in 1976) and Fury (their only known single "Miss Demeanor/Stay on Your Feet" in 1977). Guthrie's connection with GTO Records landed him engineering and production duties on the second and third albums for The Movies (Double A and Bullets Through The Barrier); followed by work with Runner (producing their only release, which made the Billboard Top 100). After producing the Judas Priest track "Better By You, Better Than Me" for the album Stained Class, he was selected to produce their follow-up album Killing Machine (aka Hell Bent for Leather).

By 1980, Guthrie's body of work in regards to engineering, mixing, and production would include a total of six hit singles on both the British and American charts: the first three singles from Heatwave, Marshall Hain's "Dancing in the City", Pink Floyd's "Another Brick in the Wall (Part II)" and The Pointer Sisters' "He's So Shy".

== Pink Floyd ==
In mid-1978, Guthrie received a request from Pink Floyd's manager, Steve O'Rourke, to meet with him regarding potential production projects. First was a pitch to produce singer/songwriter Tom Robinson (and the result was his production of "Our People", the b-side of the "Bully for You" single in 1979). The other was for Pink Floyd, about to embark on their new project, a concept album which was eventually titled The Wall. Based on his previous production credits and after meeting with Guthrie, Roger Waters believed he would be a good fit. Guthrie accepted the assignment with the request that he would be allowed to engineer the record himself.

Guthrie was the only member of the production team to be awarded by NARAS for his contributions, receiving the 1980 Grammy award for Best Engineered Recording, Non-Classical.

A case can be made for Guthrie's involvement as an important element of the timeless sound Pink Floyd was able to achieve with The Wall. David Gilmour stated in a March 2000 interview with Record Collector, regarding the contributors, "Another crucial figure is James Guthrie. The album's wonderfully clear and punchy, and very modern-sounding." Nick Mason also acknowledged Guthrie's contribution specifically in regards to the drum sound in an interview with TapeOp magazine: "James Guthrie was great on The Wall – I thought he did a great job."

Guthrie's initial involvement with Pink Floyd was to last nearly five years; in addition to engineering and co-production duties on The Wall, he also served as the Sound Mixer (supervising the Front of House engineering team) on most of the performances of The Wall live as well as actual recording of some of the performances (he would later provide the mix and production for the release Is There Anybody Out There? The Wall Live 1980–81), as well as Sound Coordinator on the film adaptation Pink Floyd—The Wall (he would engineer the music for film as well as produce it in collaboration with Waters and Gilmour). Guthrie received a British Academy of Film and Television Arts award for Best Film Sound in 1982 for his work on the film, (along with sound editor Eddy Joseph, production mixer Clive Winter, and dubbing mixers Graham Hartstone and Nicholas Le Messurier). He was then asked to co-produce (along with Michael Kamen) The Final Cut, the last release of Waters-era Pink Floyd. According to Andy Jackson, who served as engineer for the recording along with Guthrie, the use of the name "Max" in the songs "The Gunner's Dream" and "Paranoid Eyes" is an appropriation of Guthrie's nickname (the members of the production team – Guthrie, Jackson and Kamen – each had nicknames), which Waters had originally included as a joke, but decided that it suited the overall concept and created an actual character in the narrative with the name.

Guthrie appears in at least three documentaries about Pink Floyd: in The Lost Documentary (filmed in August 1980 and never officially released but was made available in 2004), he was interviewed and received an onscreen credit as "Sound Mixer". In The Other Side of The Wall (chronicling the making of Pink Floyd The Wall) he appears onscreen during a sequence depicting recording of additional music for the film but is neither credited nor interviewed; and in Retrospective: Looking Back at The Wall (included on the DVD release of Pink Floyd—The Wall) he is interviewed and receives an onscreen credit as "Music Producer" in the second half of the documentary. Guthrie also appears in the "Editing and Music" featurette for the DVD release of The Last Mimzy, in a sequence which depicts recording for the Waters song "Hello (I Love You)" but is neither interviewed nor credited; as well as the music video produced for the song. He was also interviewed (without onscreen credit) for the electronic press kit used to promote the release of Pulse in 1995. A little-known feature of the Waters DVD release In the Flesh is when the viewer selects the option for "A/V Setup" the menu screen shows a looping film of Guthrie (as well as his assistant Joel Plante) at the recording console inside Le Mobile Remote Recording Studio, used to record the audio for the CD and DVD releases.

== Post-Wall era ==
In 1986 Guthrie emigrated to the United States, first residing in Los Angeles where he and his business manager/partner Larry Belling owned and operated Slippery Studios, a recording facility specifically geared towards sessions for film. Guthrie eventually settled in Lake Tahoe, California where he designed his own home-based studio, das boot recording (named in tribute to Guthrie's love of WWII-era American submarines). Guthrie and his assistant engineer, Joel Plante, supervise every remastering of the Pink Floyd back catalogue, as well as mixing and mastering of various works (some for 5.1 Surround Sound), including Pink Floyd-related releases.

In the 1980s, Guthrie would produce a number of other releases, including Heatwave's fourth album Candles (co-produced with lead singer Johnnie Wilder, Jr.), Queensrÿche's major-label debut The Warning, Ambrosia's concept album Road Island (the final release of the David Pack era), and three tracks on The Boomtown Rats' In the Long Grass. He would also work as an engineer on various releases, such as Kate Bush's Hounds of Love (all orchestral sessions) and The Dream Academy's Remembrance Days; as well as contributing miscellaneous music and sound design for films such as Lethal Weapon, The Dead Zone and Lifeforce. Guthrie has also produced tracks for Toto and Danish rock band Kashmir, among other artists. Guthrie would also become the engineer who has mixed the most releases using QSound technology, nine in all.

Guthrie's primary responsibility was (as it is to this day) to serve as one of the final authorities on the audio quality of Pink Floyd and Floyd-related releases. He has mixed and/or mastered nearly every Pink Floyd and Floyd-related release since 1978, and could be considered to be Pink Floyd's archival engineer. Others have referred to him similarly, such as mastering engineer Doug Sax ("He has also been the Floyd's quality control man ever since The Wall.") and musician/Pink Floyd associate Jon Carin ("He is the keeper of the audio flame.") In 2002, Guthrie was selected by the band to engineer the 30th Anniversary reissue of The Dark Side of the Moon in the SACD format, providing the mix and mastering for 5.1 Surround Sound. The final product was the biggest-selling Surround Sound release of 2003, the winner of three 2003 Surround Music awards, and received overwhelming praise from the technical press, including Jerry Del Colliano of Audio Video Revolution ("If you were to own only one SACD, Dark Side of the Moon is it.") and this summation from Matt Rowe of The Digital Bits: "The way I see it, James Guthrie should be asked to do every 5.1 SACD project from here on out. For every band."

In recent years, Guthrie has worked on a number of projects, including an eponymous-named remix of the Blink-182 song "I Miss You", mastered releases for Kate Bush and Gilmour, as well as co-produced the track "Hello (I Love You)" for Waters (which appears on the soundtrack for the film The Last Mimzy) and performed the remastering of the 1984 Gilmour release About Face and the 40th Anniversary reissue of Pink Floyd's debut release The Piper at the Gates of Dawn. Guthrie was also part of the Pink Floyd crew for the band's reunion performance at Live 8, assisting with the live video feed mix for television broadcast; and subsequently provided the live mix for Waters' appearance at Live Earth.

In 2011 Guthrie contributed to two major reissue projects for Kate Bush and Pink Floyd. On Bush's release Director's Cut he performed the mix of the revision of "The Song of Solomon" as well as the mastering of the album in collaboration with Doug Sax and Sangwook "Sunny" Naam of The Mastering Lab. The trio also performed a remastering of The Red Shoes from the original analogue back-up copies of the master recording. For the Pink Floyd reissue campaign entitled Why Pink Floyd...? the entire back catalogue of the band has been remastered by Guthrie for release in a variety of deluxe editions and box sets. In conjunction with the campaign was the release of his 5.1 mix and mastering of Wish You Were Here for SACD by independent audiophile distributor Acoustic Sounds. 2012 would see Guthrie returning to producing with The Dreamer's Machine, the debut album by singer-songwriter James Carrington, which he co-produced and mixed.

In 2014 Guthrie was invited to be the Guest of Honour for Princeton University's Pink Floyd: Sight, Sound and Structure academic conference – which took place 10–14 April – sponsoring a 5.1 demonstration of The Dark Side of the Moon and Wish You Were Here albums and the world premiere of the Surround Sound mix of Roger Waters' 1992 release Amused to Death, as well as delivering a keynote speech on his work with Pink Floyd in addition to his insights regarding the roles of production and engineering in recorded music.

2015 saw releases from both Roger Waters and David Gilmour which featured mastering by Guthrie and Joel Plante, as well as the debut album from Matt Gilmour, entitled The Grey.

In 2018, Guthrie and Plante undertook a project to remaster the entire studio catalogue for Kate Bush, to be released in a series of boxsets as well as single discs.

== Selected discography and credits (Pink Floyd and related releases) ==
- Pink Floyd The Wall (1979) – Co-producer. Engineer. Sound mixer. Drums on "The Happiest Days of Our Lives", string synth and backwards message on "Empty Spaces", drill on "Hey You", sequencer on "In the Flesh", backwards cymbal & running and panting on "Run Like Hell".
- Pink Floyd The Wall performances (1980–1981) – Front of House mixer.
- Pink Floyd A Collection of Great Dance Songs (1981) – Co-producer. Sound mixer.
- Pink Floyd "Money" (1981) – Co-production and mixing of re-recording for A Collection of Great Dance Songs.
- Nick Mason's Fictitious Sports (1981) – Sound mixer.
- Pink Floyd—The Wall (1982) – Sound coordinator and engineer. Music co-producer.
- Pink Floyd The Final Cut (1983) – Co-produced with Roger Waters and Michael Kamen. Engineer. Sound mixer.
- David Gilmour About Face (1984) – Sound mixer.
- Pink Floyd A Momentary Lapse of Reason (1987) – Additional remixing.
- Pink Floyd "Run Like Hell" (live version) single (1987) – Mixing with David Gilmour.
- Roger Waters Amused to Death (1992) – Sound mixer.
- Pink Floyd CD remasters (1992–1994) – Supervised the remastering of the Pink Floyd back catalogue for CD with Doug Sax. (See also: Shine On boxset.)
- Pink Floyd MiniDisc remasters (1994) – Supervised remastering with Doug Sax.
- Pink Floyd The Division Bell (1994) – Mastering with Doug Sax.
- Pink Floyd Pulse (1995) – Co-produced with David Gilmour. Recorded and mixed.
- Pink Floyd Pulse VHS (1995) – Music production. Recorded sound engineer.
- Pink Floyd Pulse television commercial (1995) – Audio mix.
- Richard Wright Broken China (1996) – Sound mixer.
- Pink Floyd—The Wall DVD (1999) – Producer. Audio formats.
- Pink Floyd Is There Anybody Out There? The Wall Live 1980–81 (1999) – Producer. Recording. Sound mixer.
- Roger Waters In The Flesh (2000) – Producer. Engineer. Sound mixer.
- Pink Floyd Wish You Were Here 25th Anniversary video (2001) – Audio mix.
- Pink Floyd Echoes: The Best of Pink Floyd (2001) – Co-production and mastering.
- Roger Waters In the Flesh DVD (2001) – Music producer and mixer.
- Roger Waters Flickering Flame: The Solo Years Vol. 1 (2002) – Compiled with Roger Waters.
- David Gilmour In Concert DVD (2002) – Audio mastering.
- Pink Floyd The Dark Side of the Moon 30th Anniversary Edition (2003) – SACD 5.1 mixing and mastering. Stereo remaster.
- Pink Floyd The Final Cut 2004 remaster – Stereo remaster.
- Pink Floyd Is There Anybody Out There? The Wall Live 1980–81 2004 remaster – Stereo remaster.
- Pink Floyd A Momentary Lapse of Reason 2005 remaster – Stereo remaster.
- Pink Floyd Live 8 performance (2005) – Assisted in mixing live video feed.
- Comfortably Numb: A History of "The Wall", Pink Floyd 1978–1981 — Research, editing, photos (2005–2006).
- Pink Floyd Pulse DVD — Music producer. DVD producer (with Storm Thorgerson). Video restoration. Audio for menus (with Joel Plante). (2005–2006).
- David Gilmour On an Island (2006) – Mastering with Doug Sax.
- David Gilmour About Face 2006 remaster – Stereo remaster.
- Roger Waters "Hello (I Love You)" (2007) – Co-producer with Roger Waters and Howard Shore. Recording and mixing.
- The Last Mimzy – Remix of Roger Waters' "Hello (I Love You)" for the movie soundtrack (end credits) (2007).
- The Last Mimzy Original Motion Picture Soundtrack (2007) – Remix of Roger Waters' "Hello (I Love You)" for the soundtrack album (different than the movie version).
- Pink Floyd The Piper at the Gates of Dawn 40th Anniversary Edition (2007) – Compiled and remastered.
- Roger Waters Live Earth performance (2007) – Sound mixer.
- Live Earth DVD and CD (2007) – Mixing and mastering of Roger Waters songs.
- Roger Waters The Wall Live 30th Anniversary world tour (2010–2013) – Music & Quadraphonic pre-production.
- Pink Floyd CD remasters (2009–2011) – Remastering of the Pink Floyd back catalogue (with Joel Plante) for CD. (See also: Discovery boxset.)
- Pink Floyd Wish You Were Here 35th Anniversary Edition (2011) – SACD 5.1 mixing and mastering. Stereo remaster.
- The Missing Piano – Director/Producer/Editor/Filming/Sound (2012).
- 12-12-12: The Concert for Sandy Relief digital and physical formats (2012) – Mixing and mastering of Roger Waters songs.
- The Final Cut: A History of Pink Floyd 1982–1983 — Writing, research, editing, photos (2008–2014).
- Roger Waters Roger Waters The Wall (2014) – Music & Quadraphonic pre-production, Sound supervisor: Athens.
- Roger Waters Amused to Death 2015 remaster – SACD/Blu-ray 5.1 mixing and mastering. Stereo remaster.
- David Gilmour Rattle That Lock (2015) – Mastering with Joel Plante.
- Roger Waters Roger Waters The Wall original motion picture soundtrack (2015) – Music & Quadraphonic pre-production, Sound supervisor: Athens.
- Roger Waters Desert Trip live performances (2016) – Music pre-production.
- Pink Floyd vinyl remasters (2015–2018) — Remastering of the Pink Floyd back catalogue (with Joel Plante and Bernie Grundman) for vinyl.
- Pink Floyd Animals 2018 remix – Stereo/SACD/Blu-ray 5.1 mixing and mastering.
- Pink Floyd The Dark Side of the Moon 50th Anniversary 2023 stereo remaster of the original album; Dolby Atmos surround mix of the studio album.
- Pink Floyd Animals 2018 remix – Dolby Atmos surround mix.

== Selected discography (as producer) ==
- Arlan Greene – '"The Jazz Pianist" (b-side of "We've Got To Split Up" single) (Arista), 1976
- Fury – '"Miss Demeanor/Stay on Your Feet" (Arista), 1977
- The Movies – Double "A" (GTO), 1977
- The Movies – Bullets Through The Barrier (GTO), 1978
- Judas Priest – "Better By You, Better Than Me" Stained Class (Columbia), 1978
- Judas Priest – Killing Machine (aka Hell Bent for Leather) (Columbia), 1978
- Runner – Runner (Island), 1979
- Pink Floyd – The Wall (Harvest/Columbia), 1979
- Tom Robinson Band – '"Our People" (b-side of "Bully For You" single) (Arista), 1979
- Heatwave – Candles (Epic), 1980
- Pink Floyd – "Money" A Collection of Great Dance Songs (Harvest/Columbia), 1981
- Ambrosia – Road Island (Warner Bros), 1982
- Pink Floyd – The Final Cut (Harvest/Columbia), 1983
- The Boomtown Rats – In the Long Grass (Phonogram/Columbia), 1984 ("Tonight," "Dave," "Drag Me Down")
- Broadcast – '"Where Are You Now/Visions of You" (A&M), 1984
- Queensryche – The Warning (EMI America), 1984
- Andrew Caine – One (Epic), 1986
- Tom De Luca – Down to the Wire (Epic), 1986
- Toto – Past to Present 1977–1990 (Columbia), 1990 ("Love Has The Power," "Out of Love," "Can You Hear What I'm Saying," "Animal")
- The Lou Gramm Band – '"One Dream" Highlander II: The Quickening original soundtrack (WEA), 1992
- John Wetton – sessions for Raised in Captivity (the completed album was later recorded with another producer and released as Battle Lines), 1992 ("Walking on Air," "If I Was A Country")
- Toto – Absolutely Live (Columbia), 1993
- Pink Floyd – Pulse (EMI/Columbia), 1995
- Kashmir – The Good Life (Sony International), 1999
- Pink Floyd – Is There Anybody Out There? The Wall Live 1980–81 (EMI/Columbia), 2000
- Roger Waters – In The Flesh (Columbia), 2000
- Pink Floyd – Echoes: The Best of Pink Floyd (EMI/Columbia), 2001
- Roger Waters – Flickering Flame: The Solo Years Vol. 1 (Columbia), 2002
- Roger Waters – "Hello (I Love You)" The Last Mimzy original soundtrack (Silva Screen), 2007
- James Carrington – The Dreamer's Machine (Zero Music), 2012

== Awards ==
- New Musical Express award for Best British Engineered Record ("Dancing in the City" from Marshall Hain's Free Ride), 1979.
- Grammy award for Best Engineered Recording – Non-Classical, Pink Floyd's The Wall, 1980.
- BAFTA award for Best Film Sound, Pink Floyd—The Wall, 1983.
- Surround Music Awards, 2003

(all for the 30th Anniversary Edition of Pink Floyd's The Dark Side of the Moon in SACD/5.1 Surround Sound):

Best Multichannel Reissue
High Fidelity Review Listener's Choice
Best of Show.

- Grammy award for Best Surround Sound Album, Roger Waters's Amused to Death, 2016.
- Guthrie also received a nomination for the Grammy for Best Surround Sound Album in 2004, for his work on the DVD-A/5.1 reissue of Bonnie Raitt's Nick of Time.
- dCS Legends Award, 2020.

== Bibliography ==
Books

- Blake, Mark. Pigs Might Fly: The Inside Story of Pink Floyd, 2007. ISBN 978-1-84513-261-3
- Fitch, Vernon. The Pink Floyd Encyclopedia (3rd Edition), 2005. ISBN 978-1-894959-24-7
- Fitch, Vernon and Richard Mahon. Comfortably Numb A History of "The Wall", Pink Floyd 1978–81, 2006. ISBN 978-0-9777366-0-7
- Mason, Nick. Inside Out: A Personal History of Pink Floyd (revised edition), 2005. ISBN 978-0-8118-4824-4
- Thorgerson, Storm and Peter Curzon. Mind Over Matter 4: The Images of Pink Floyd (40th Anniversary Edition), 2007. ISBN 978-1-84609-763-8

Articles

- Bailey, Craig "Interview with Andy Jackson", floydianslip.com, January 2001
- Cunningham, Mark "Welcome to the Machine: The Story of Pink Floyd's Live Sound, Part 3", Sound on Stage, May 1997
- Danesh, Arash "Interview with Jon Carin", brain-damage.co.uk, August 2007
- Del Colliano, Jerry "Pink Floyd: ''Dark Side of the Moon'' SACD", avrev.com, March 2003.
- "Doug Sax takes us to the Dark Side", news.acousticsounds.com, March 2003
- Larsen, Thomas Ulrik "Dream Job", Musikmagasinet, November 2009
- Richardson, Ken "Tales from the Dark Side", Sound & Vision, May 2003
- Rowe, Matt. "Pink Floyd: Dark Side of the Moon SACD", thedigitalbits.com, April 2003
- Shilling, George "Interview with Andy Jackson", recordproduction.com 2007
- Touzeau, Jeff. "Phil Taylor and the Astoria: Driving Audio Standards on the River Thames", Tape Op, March/April 2005
- Tsilderikis, Thanasis. "With Friends Surrounded: 'Credit Veterans' in Pink Floyd-related projects", sparebricks.fika.org, Fall 2004
- White, Paul "Andy Jackson: Recording David Gilmour's On An Island", Sound on Sound, July 2006
- Whitlock, Kevin "Pink Floyd – Behind The Wall", Record Collector, March 2000
