= Young Lust (song) =

1979 song by Pink Floyd

Song by Pink Floyd

from the album The Wall
- Released: 30 November 1979
- Recorded: April–November 1979
- Genre: Hard rock; blues rock
- Length: 3:25 (album version); 3:56 (Italian single version)
- Label: Harvest (UK); Columbia (US)
- Songwriters: Roger Waters; David Gilmour
- Producers: Bob Ezrin; David Gilmour; James Guthrie; Roger Waters

Audio
- "Young Lust" on YouTube

"Young Lust" is a song by the English rock band Pink Floyd, released in November 1979. It is the ninth track on the band's eleventh studio album The Wall (1979). The lyrics to the song are about the band throwing themselves into the headlong of hedonism, sex, drugs, and rock and roll.

== Composition ==
"Young Lust" is a blues-inflected hard rock number in E minor, approximately 3 minutes, 25 seconds in length. The song was composed by David Gilmour, who also provided lead vocals with backing vocals from Roger Waters during the chorus, who wrote the lyrics. The lyrics are about a "rock-and-roll refugee" seeking casual sex to relieve the tedium of touring. It is one of a number of Pink Floyd songs in which Gilmour plays bass guitar and one of three songs Gilmour co-wrote for The Wall. On the album, the preceding song, "Empty Spaces", ends with an abrupt transition into "Young Lust".

An extended 7" single version was released in Italy, South Africa and Rhodesia. It was 3:58 in length and included a 12-bar instrumental intro with a simple 16-beat drum rhythm that leads into an 8-bar guitar intro. The final 32-bar outro is unobscured by the phone call that is on the album version.

== Plot ==
The Wall tells the story of Pink, an embittered and alienated rock star. At this point in the album's narrative, Pink has achieved wealth and fame, and is usually away from home, due to the demands of his career as a touring performer. He is having casual sex with groupies to relieve the tedium of the road, and is living a separate life from his wife.

The end of the song is a segment of dialogue between Pink and a telephone operator, as Pink twice attempts to place a transatlantic collect call to his wife. A man answers, and when the operator asks if he will accept the charges, the man simply hangs up. This is how Pink learns that his wife is cheating on him. ("See, he keeps hanging up", says the operator. "And it's a man answering!") With this betrayal, his mental breakdown accelerates.

The dialogue with the operator was the result of an arrangement co-producer James Guthrie made with a neighbour in London, Chris Fitzmorris, while the album was being recorded in Los Angeles. He wanted realism, for the operator to actually believe they had caught his wife having an affair, and so did not inform her she was being recorded. The operator heard in the recording is the second operator they tried the routine with, after the first operator's reaction was deemed unsatisfactory.

== Film version ==
In the film, the scene with the attempted phone call, in which Pink learns his wife is cheating on him, occurs at the very beginning of the song "What Shall We Do Now?" (a song cut from the album shortly before release which "Empty Spaces" was originally intended to be a reprise of), before the "Young Lust" song rather than at the end of the "Young Lust" song. The implications of the song are therefore slightly different. On the album, he is already unfaithful to his wife while on tour, making him a hypocrite when he is appalled at her own unfaithfulness. In the film, he is only seen with a groupie after he learns of his wife's affair, which shows the character in a more sympathetic light.

In the film, several groupies (including a young Joanne Whalley, in her film debut) seduce security guards and roadies to get backstage passes, where one of them (Jenny Wright) ends up going with Pink (Bob Geldof) to his room.

== Personnel ==
Pink Floyd

- David Gilmour – guitar, bass guitar, lead vocals
- Nick Mason – drums, tambourine
- Roger Waters – backing vocals
- Richard Wright – Hammond organ, Wurlitzer electric piano

With:

- Chris Fitzmorris – male telephone voice

Personnel per Vernon Fitch and Richard Mahon.

Original phone call made by FM-USA (circa 1970s)

== Cover versions ==
- During Roger Waters' The Wall concert in Berlin on 21 July 1990, the song was performed by the Canadian singer-songwriter Bryan Adams. This version reached No. 7 on the US Mainstream Rock Tracks chart. It has been added to YouTube from Adams' official channel.
- Producer John Law covered the song with banjo and electronics.
- Canadian alternative country and bluegrass band Luther Wright and the Wrongs covered the song as a reimagined loud, raucous rocker on Rebuild the Wall (2001).
- The song was parodied on Bob Rivers' Twisted Tunes collection as "I Want to Be a Woman", dealing with the theme of gender transition.

== Certifications ==
Certifications for "Young Lust"
| Region | Certification | Certified units/sales |
|---|---|---|
| New Zealand (RMNZ) | Gold | 15,000^{‡} |
^{‡} Sales+streaming figures based on certification alone.
