= Another Brick in the Wall =

1979 three-part song by Pink Floyd

Song by Pink Floyd

from the album The Wall
- Released: 30 November 1979
- Recorded: April–November 1979
- Genre: Art rock; hard rock; progressive rock
- Length: 8:28 (All three parts): 3:11 (Part 1); 3:59 (Part 2); 1:18 (Part 3)
- Label: Harvest (UK); Columbia (US)
- Songwriter: Roger Waters
- Producers: Bob Ezrin; David Gilmour; James Guthrie; Roger Waters

"Another Brick in the Wall, Part 2"

Single by Pink Floyd

from the album The Wall
- B-side: "One of My Turns"
- Released: 23 November 1979
- Recorded: April–November 1979
- Genre: Art rock; funk rock; disco; protest song
- Length: 3:11 (single version); 3:59 (album version); 3:54 (A Collection of Great Dance Songs version); 5:50 (album version combined with "The Happiest Days of Our Lives", alternative radio edit)
- Label: Harvest (UK); Columbia (US)
- Songwriter: Roger Waters

Pink Floyd singles chronology
"Have a Cigar" (1975)	"Another Brick in the Wall, Part 2" (1979)	"Run Like Hell" (1980)

Music video
- "Another Brick in the Wall, Part 2" on YouTube

"Another Brick in the Wall" is a three-part composition on Pink Floyd's eleventh studio album The Wall (1979), written by the bassist, Roger Waters. "Part 2", a protest song against corporal punishment in schools and rigid and abusive schooling, features a children's choir. At the suggestion of the producer, Bob Ezrin, Pink Floyd incorporated elements of disco. The song is composed in Dorian mode.

"Part 2" was Pink Floyd's first UK single since "Point Me at the Sky" (1968). It sold more than four million copies worldwide and topped singles charts in 14 countries, including the UK and the US, and was the UK Christmas No. 1 of 1979. It was nominated for a Grammy Award and was ranked number 384 on Rolling Stone's list of the "500 Greatest Songs of All Time".

== Concept ==
The three parts of "Another Brick in the Wall" appear on Pink Floyd's 1979 rock opera studio album The Wall. They are essentially one verse each, although Part 2 sees its own verse sung twice: once by Floyd members, and the second time by the children's choir along with Waters and Gilmour. During "Part 1", the protagonist, Pink, begins building a metaphorical wall around himself following the death of his father. In "Part 2", traumas involving his overprotective mother and abusive schoolteachers become bricks in the wall. Following a violent breakdown in "Part 3", Pink dismisses everyone he knows as "just bricks in the wall."

Band leader Roger Waters wrote "Part 2" as a protest against oppressive schooling. "Another Brick in the Wall" appears in the film based on the album. In the "Part 2" sequence, children enter a school and march in unison through a meat grinder, becoming "putty-faced" clones, before rioting and burning down the school.

== Recording ==
At the suggestion of the producer Bob Ezrin, Pink Floyd added elements of disco, which was popular at the time. According to the guitarist David Gilmour:

[Ezrin] said to me, "Go to a couple of clubs and listen to what's happening with disco music," so I forced myself out and listened to loud, four-to-the-bar bass drums and stuff and thought, Gawd, awful! Then we went back and tried to turn one of the parts into one of those so it would be catchy.

Gilmour recorded his guitar solo using a 1955 Gibson Les Paul Gold Top guitar with P-90 pickups. The American session guitarist Lee Ritenour said in a 2024 interview that Ezrin had him record some ideas for the solo, as Pink Floyd could not decide how to end it. Though his parts were not used, he said he detected his influence in the last bars of Gilmour's solo.

Despite his reservations about the disco element, Gilmour felt the final song sounded like Pink Floyd. When Ezrin heard the song with a disco beat, he was convinced it could become a hit, but felt it needed to be longer, with two verses and two choruses. The band resisted, saying they did not release singles, and Waters told him: "Go ahead and waste your time doing silly stuff."

While the band members were away, Ezrin edited the takes into an extended version. He also had the engineer Nick Griffiths record children singing the verse at Islington Green School, close to Pink Floyd's studio. Griffiths was instructed to record only two or three children. Inspired by a Todd Rundgren album featuring an audience in each stereo channel, he suggested recording a school choir. The school allotted only 40 minutes for the recording.

Alun Renshaw, the head of music at the school, was enthusiastic, and later said: "I wanted to make music relevant to the kids – not just sitting around listening to Tchaikovsky. I thought the lyrics were great – 'We don't need no education, we don't need no thought control' ... I just thought it would be a wonderful experience for the kids." The children's choir in the recording featured 23 students, who practised for about a week to prepare. Renshaw hid the lyrics from the headteacher, Margaret Maden, fearing she might stop the recording. Maden said: "I was only told about it after the event, which didn't please me. But on balance it was part of a very rich musical education."

Renshaw and the children spent a week practising before he took them to a recording studio near the school. According to Ezrin, when he played the children's vocals to Waters, "There was a total softening of his face, and you just knew that he knew it was going to be an important record." Waters said: "It was great—exactly the thing I expected from a collaborator." The children of Islington School received tickets to a Pink Floyd concert, an album and a single. Though the school received a payment of £1,000, there was no arrangement for royalties for the children. Following a change to the copyright law of the United Kingdom in 1996, they became eligible for royalties from broadcasts. After the royalties agent Peter Rowan traced the choir members through the social network service Friends Reunited and other means, they successfully lodged a claim for royalties with the Performing Artists' Media Rights Association in 2004.

== Reception ==
"Another Brick in the Wall, Part 2" was released as a single, Pink Floyd's first in the UK since "Point Me at the Sky" (1968). It was also the Christmas number one of 1979 and the final number one of the decade in the UK. It remained at the top until mid-January, in the process also becoming the first UK number of the 1980s. In the US, it reached number 57 on the disco chart. The single sold over 4 million copies worldwide. Cashbox described it as a "catchy but foreboding selection, with its ominously steady drum work and angry lyrics." Critic Mike Cormack said "Another Brick in the Wall, Part 2" was a "magnificent achievement: its catchy rhythm undercutting the darkness of the song's theme, the irony of its chorus belying the acidulous disdain of the lyric, Waters' quality as a wordsmith on display with the excellent phrase 'dark sarcasm', and the simplicity of its structure giving it a tight focus."

The song won Waters the 1983 British Academy Award for Best Original Song for its appearance in The Wall film. "Part 2" was nominated for a Grammy Award for Best Performance by a Rock Duo or Group. It appeared at number 384 on Rolling Stone's 2010 list of the "500 Greatest Songs of All Time". The lyrics attracted controversy. The Inner London Education Authority described the song as "scandalous", and according to Renshaw, then-Prime Minister Margaret Thatcher "hated it". Renshaw said, "There was a political knee-jerk reaction to a song that had nothing to do with the education system. It was [Waters'] reflections on his life and how his schooling was part of that." The single, as well as the album The Wall, were banned in South Africa in 1980 after it was adopted by supporters of a nationwide school boycott protesting instituted racial inequalities in education caused by apartheid.

== Charts ==
=== Weekly charts ===
Chart (1979–80)	Peak position
Australia (Kent Music Report)	2
Austria (Ö3 Austria Top 40)	1
Belgium (Ultratop 50 Flanders)	2
Canada Top Singles (RPM)	1
Denmark (Hitlisten)	5
Finland (Suomen virallinen lista)	1
Germany (GfK)	1
Ireland (IRMA)	1
Israel Singles Chart	1
Italy (Musica e Dischi)	2
Netherlands (Dutch Top 40)	3
Netherlands (Single Top 100)	4
New Zealand (Recorded Music NZ)	1
Norway (VG-lista)	1
Portugal Singles Chart	1
South African Chart (Springbok Radio)	1
Spain (PROMUSICAE)	2
Sweden (Sverigetopplistan)	1
Switzerland (Schweizer Hitparade)	1
UK Singles (Official Charts)	1
US Billboard Hot 100	1
US Dance Club Songs (Billboard)	57
US Cash Box Top 100	1

Chart (2012)	Peak position
France (SNEP)	118

Chart (2014)	Peak position
France (SNEP)	164

=== Year-end charts ===
Chart (1980)	Rank
Australia (Kent Music Report)	4
Canada	1
Germany	2
Italy (TV Sorrisi e Canzoni)	9
Netherlands (Dutch Top 40)	61
Netherlands (Single Top 100)	44
New Zealand	5
South Africa	8
Switzerland	1
US Billboard Hot 100	2
US Cash Box Top 100	3

=== All-time charts ===
Chart	Position
US Billboard Hot 100 (1958–2018)	146
UK Singles (Official Charts Company)	104

== Sales and certifications ==
Region	Certification	Certified units/sales
Canada	—	260,000
Denmark (IFPI Danmark)	Platinum	90,000^{‡}
France (SNEP)	Gold	500,000^{*}
Germany (BVMI)	Gold	250,000^{^}
Italy (FIMI)	2× Platinum	100,000^{‡}
New Zealand (RMNZ) Part 2	4× Platinum	120,000^{‡}
New Zealand (RMNZ) Part 1	Gold	15,000^{‡}
South Africa	—	60,000
Spain (Promusicae)	Platinum	60,000^{‡}
United Kingdom (BPI)	Platinum	1,146,548
United States (RIAA) physical	Platinum	1,000,000^{^}
United States (RIAA) digital	Gold	500,000^{*}
Summaries
Worldwide	—	4,000,000
^{*} Sales figures based on certification alone.^{^} Shipments figures based on certification alone.^{‡} Sales+streaming figures based on certification alone.

== Personnel ==
Personnel, according to The Pink Floyd Encyclopedia.

Part 1

- Roger Waters – lead vocals, bass guitar
- David Gilmour – guitar, harmony vocals
- Richard Wright – Prophet-5 synthesiser, Minimoog

Part 2

- Roger Waters – bass guitar, vocals (unison with Gilmour)
- David Gilmour – guitar, vocals (unison with Waters)
- Nick Mason – drums
- Richard Wright – Hammond organ, Prophet-5 synthesiser
- Islington Green School students (organised by Alun Renshaw) – vocals

Part 3

- Roger Waters – bass guitar, vocals, rhythm guitar
- David Gilmour – guitar
- Nick Mason – drums
- Richard Wright – Prophet-5 synthesiser

== Roger Waters versions ==
"Another Brick in the Wall, Part 2" (Live in Berlin)

Single by Roger Waters, with Cyndi Lauper

from the album The Wall – Live in Berlin
- B-side: "Run Like Hell" (Potsdamer Mix)
- Released: 10 September 1990
- Recorded: 21 July 1990
- Venue: Potsdamer Platz (Berlin, Germany)
- Genre: Rock; disco
- Length: 6:29
- Label: Mercury
- Songwriter: Roger Waters
- Producers: Roger Waters; Nick Griffiths

Roger Waters singles chronology
"Who Needs Information" (1987)	"Another Brick in the Wall, Part 2" (Live in Berlin) (1990)	"The Tide Is Turning" (Live in Berlin) (1990)

A live version of "Another Brick in the Wall, Part 2" with Cyndi Lauper on vocals, recorded on 21 July 1990 at Potsdamer Platz, was released as a single on 10 September 1990 to promote The Wall – Live in Berlin. The B-side was the live version of "Run Like Hell" performed with the German hard rock band Scorpions at the same concert. In promotion of The Wall – Live in Berlin a new studio version was recorded by Roger Waters and the Bleeding Heart Band that was released on promotional compilation album titled The Wall Berlin '90 featuring Pink Floyd and Roger Waters solo recordings.

Another live version appeared on Waters' album In the Flesh – Live, integrated between "The Happiest Days of Our Lives" and "Mother" as on the original studio album, but with a reprise of the first verse ending the song. For later shows, Waters usually employed local school choirs to perform the song with him. During The Wall Live concert series, Waters added an acoustic coda called "The Ballad of Jean Charles de Menezes". A recording was released on the concert film Roger Waters: The Wall and its live album.

=== Track listings ===
7" single
No.	Title	Length
1.	"Another Brick in the Wall, Part 2 (Edited Version)"	4:02
2.	"Run Like Hell"	5:07

12" single
No.	Title	Length
1.	"Another Brick in the Wall, Part 2 (Full Version)"	6:29
2.	"Run Like Hell (Potsdamer Mix)"	6:18

CD
No.	Title	Length
1.	"Another Brick in the Wall, Part 2 (Full Version)"	6:29
2.	"Run Like Hell (Potsdamer Mix)"	6:18
3.	"Another Brick in the Wall, Part 2 (Edited Version)"	4:02

== Cover versions ==
- Disco group Snatch released a cover version on Millennium Records in 1980 that peaked at No. 77 on the Billboard dance chart in October of that year and was on the chart for 7 weeks.

- The American nu metal band Korn covered all three parts, along with The Wall song "Goodbye Cruel World", for a track on their 2004 compilation album Greatest Hits Vol. 1. It was released as a promotional single. Will Levith of Ultimate Classic Rock called Korn's cover "one of the worst covers of a classic rock song of all time," while Jason Birchmeier of AllMusic described the cover as "overwrought, yet enticingly so". A live music video was released, directed by Bill Yukich. On the Billboard magazine (US), the version peaked at number 37 on the Modern Rock Tracks and number twelve on the Mainstream Rock Tracks.
- The American alternative rock supergroup Class of '99's only known recordings were cover versions of "Another Brick in the Wall, Part 2" and "Another Brick in the Wall, Part 1", recorded in 1998 for the soundtrack to Robert Rodriguez's science fiction horror film The Faculty, the film and soundtrack being released later that year. In 1999, the cover of "Another Brick in the Wall, Part 2" was issued as the only single from the soundtrack. These recordings were Alice in Chains' lead vocalist Layne Staley's final studio appearance prior to his death by drug overdose in April 2002.
- "Proper Education" – a 2007 remix of the song by Swedish DJ and record producer Eric Prydz, with the band credited as Floyd.
- The rock band Blurred Vision released a cover of "Another Brick In The Wall, Part 2" dubbed "Hey Ayatollah Leave Those Kids Alone". Filmmaker Babak Payami produced a music video, which quickly went viral on the video-sharing platform YouTube. The remake was also publicly endorsed by Roger Waters. In October 2022, Blurred Vision published an updated clip in reaction to the Mahsa Amini protests, featuring scenes from these protests with women taking off their obligatory headscarves.

== See also ==
- List of anti-war songs (pertaining to "Part 1")
