= Bospop =

Annual rock festival in Weert

Coordinates: 51.2561°N 5.6934°E

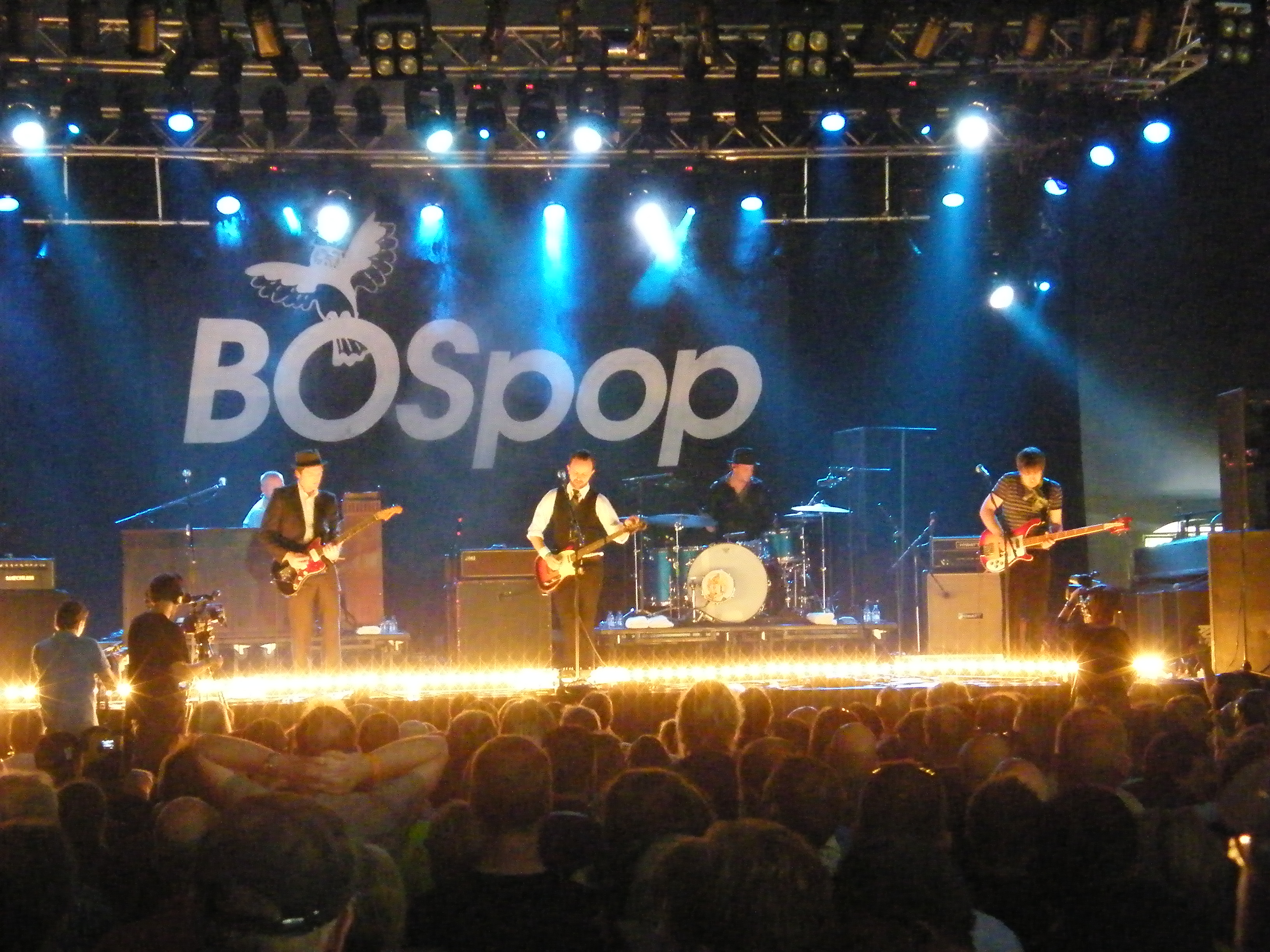
Tim Christensen, 2009

Bospop is an annual rock festival in Weert, Netherlands. It started off in 1981 as an initiative by the local youth, as an event for local amateur bands. Within a few years, it was able to book renowned Dutch bands like Fatal Flowers, Herman Brood & His Wild Romance and Golden Earring. With the help of Mojo Concerts, it upscaled in the 90s and started to book international artists like John Hiatt and Marillion.

== Line-up from 2000 onwards ==
Edition	Date	Stage	Artist / band
Bospop 2000	Saturday 8 July	Mainstage	Green Lizard, Kane, Dilana Smith, Paul Weller, De Dijk, Tower of Power
Bospop 2000	Saturday 8 July	Bluestent	Marcel Scherpenzeel, Sugercane, Connie Lush, Drippin' Honey, Carl Verheijen
Bospop 2000	Sunday 9 July	Mainstage	After Forever, Within Temptation, Spock's Beard, Anathema, Rowwen Hèze, Lukather & Winter, Joe Satriani, Dream Theater
Bospop 2000	Sunday 9 July	Bluestent	Ana Popovic Band, Cindy Peress & Band, Mason Casey, Matt Minglewood, AM5, Tinos Gonzales
Bospop 2000	Sunday 9 July	Rocktent	Arabesque, Henk Janssen, Hangnail, Orange Goblin, Vanden Plas, The Flower Kings, Clutch
Bospop 2001	Friday 13 July	Mainstage	Palace of the Brave, Beam, Ilse DeLange, Venice, Anouk, The Black Crowes
Bospop 2001	Friday 13 July	Female Stage	Kaja, Birgit Schuurman, Peppercorn, Ellen ten Damme, Judith
Bospop 2001	Saturday 14 July	Mainstage	Superfly 69, Nashville Pussy, Paradise Lost, De Heideroosjes, Pendragon, Living Colour, Savatage, Megadeth
Bospop 2001	Saturday 14 July	Rockstage	Ricocher, Toyz, House O Flies, Porcupine Tree, Vengeance, Treshold, Apocalyptica, After Forever
Bospop 2001	Saturday 14 July	Blues Stage	Starfish Bowl, Lance Keltner, Cuban Heels, Parker's Alibi, Marcus Malone, Aynsley Lister, Jon Amor
Bospop 2002	Friday 12 July	Mainstage	Fools Fatal, Van Dik Hout, Venice, Willy Deville & Band, Toto, UB40
Bospop 2002	Friday 12 July	Tent	Wealthy Beggar, Di-Rect, Rosemary's Sons, Def P & Beatbusters, Dan Baird & Friends, Fish
Bospop 2002	Saturday 13 July	Mainstage	Raging Speedhorn, Silkstone, In Extremo, Moonspell, Suicidal Tendencies, Kane, Therapy?, Bush
Bospop 2002	Saturday 13 July	Rockstage	Agitator, Brainstorm, Pro-Pain, Bigelf, The Quill, Blood Or Whiskey, Australian Nirvana, My Dying Bride
Bospop 2003	Friday 11 July	Mainstage	Action in DC, Ten Years After, Saxon, DIO, Motörhead, ZZ Top
Bospop 2003	Friday 11 July	Rockstage	Sleazy Dreams, Tacker, Jovink (en de Voederbietels), Subway To Sally, Danko Jones, Bonnie Raitt
Bospop 2003	Saturday 12 July	Mainstage	Intwine, Ilse DeLange, 16 Down, Blof, Anouk, INXS, Simple Minds
Bospop 2003	Saturday 12 July	Rockstage	Slow Poke Rodrigo, BR5-49, Spanner, Daniël Lohues, The Gathering, The Alarm, HIM
Bospop 2004	Donderdag 8 July	Mainstage	Novastar, The Doors of the 21st Century
Bospop 2004	Friday 9 July	Mainstage	Deep Purple, Status Quo, Cheap Trick, Thunder, Gotthard, Vernon Reid
Bospop 2004	Friday 9 July	Rockstage	Anthrax, Wishbone Ash, Rose Tattoo, Adler's Appetite, Raging Slab, Supergum
Bospop 2004	Saturday 10 July	Mainstage	Zucchero, Todd Rundgren, Blof, Patti Smith, Solomon Burke, Di-Rect, Beef
Bospop 2004	Saturday 10 July	Rockstage	Little Feat, John Mayall & the Bluesbreakers, Walter Trout & The Radicals, Wilco, Echo & Bunnyman, Imperial Crowns, The Sheer
Bospop 2005	Saturday 2 July	Mainstage	Joe Cocker, Roger Hodgson, Marillion, Uriah Heep, Steve Lukather, Peter Frampton, V-Male
Bospop 2005	Saturday 2 July	Tent	De Dijk, Hayseed Dixie, Last Supper, The Sheer, Vido, Cannery Row
Bospop 2005	Sunday 3 July	Mainstage	Iron Maiden, Y&T, Within Temptation, Masterplan, In Extremo, Dragon Force, SQY Rocking Team
Bospop 2005	Sunday 3 July	Tent	Porcupine Tree, My Dying Bride, Overkill, Mastodon, White Cowbell Oklahoma, Action in DC
Bospop 2006	Friday 7 July	Mainstage	Fiction Plane, The Charlatans, Sting
Bospop 2006	Saturday 8 July	Mainstage	Nada Surf, Living Colour, Gabriel Ríos, Starsailor, Beth Hart, Anouk, Simple Minds
Bospop 2006	Saturday 8 July	Tent	The Mad Trist, Daize Shayne, Popa Chubby, Stream of Passion, Glenn Hughes (Deep Purple), The Alan Parsons Project
Bospop 2006	Sunday 9 July	Mainstage	Steve Harley & Cockney Rebel, Racoon, Gov't Mule, Joe Jackson, The Tragically Hip, Roxy Music, Simply Red
Bospop 2006	Sunday 9 July	Tent	Julyan Sas Band, Jon Amor & Double Brown, Eric Gales, Rob Tognoni, Susan Tedeschi, The Waterboys
Bospop 2007	Saturday 7 July	Mainstage	Angelo Kelly, VanVelzen, Kim Wilde, Ilse de Lange, Blondie, BLØF, Joe Cocker
Bospop 2007	Saturday 7 July	Tent	21 Eyes of ruby, Blowbeat, The Answer, The Hooters, Venice, The Scene
Bospop 2007	Sunday 8 July	Mainstage	Reamonn, Cake, Thunder, The Waterboys, Paul Rodgers, Gary Moore, John Fogerty
Bospop 2007	Sunday 8 July	Tent	Connie Lush Blues Shouter, The Yayhoos, Eric Sardinas, Marc Ford, Joe Bonamassa, John Mayall
Bospop 2008	Friday 11 July	Mainstage	Neil Young (hoofdartiest), Ryan Bingham & the Dead horses, Everest, The Waterboys
Bospop 2008	Saturday 12 July	Mainstage	Stevie Ann, The Bangles, Racoon, Steve Lukather, Crowded House, Mick Hucknall: a tribute to Bobby 'Blue' Bland, Santana
Bospop 2008	Saturday 12 July	Tent	Tantrum, Jimmy Bowskill, Danny Bryant, The Hands Me Wowns, Mick Taylor & Barry McCabe, Buddy Guy
Bospop 2008	Sunday 13 July	Mainstage	Leaf, Subway to Sally, Thin Lizzy, Danko Jones, Apocalyptica, Ted Nugent, Europe, ZZ Top
Bospop 2008	Sunday 13 July	Tent	Wide Open, Dana Fuchs, Anathema, Riverside, Opeth, Dickey Betts & Great Southern, Little Feat
Bospop 2009	Saturday 11 July	Mainstage	Simon McBride, Saint Jude, Novastar, Guus Meeuwis, Fun Lovin' Criminals, Guano Apes, Foreigner
Bospop 2009	Saturday 11 July	Tent	The Brew, Bernard Allison, Drive Like Maria, Tim Christensen, Rowwen Hèze, Ryan Shaw
Bospop 2009	Sunday 12 July	Mainstage	The Sheer, Fiction Plane, Beth Hart, Jeff Beck, Queensrÿche, Chickenfoot, The Australian Pink Floyd Show
Bospop 2009	Sunday 12 July	Tent	Pronghorn, Triggerfinger, Stahlzeit, Tesla, Lucinda Williams, Paul Carrack
Bospop 2010	Saturday 10 July	Mainstage	The New Shining, Jimmie Vaughan, Saybia, De Dijk, The Cranberries, Crosby, Stills & Nash, John Fogerty
Bospop 2010	Saturday 10 July	Tent	Freestroke, Guy Forsyth & Band, Cuby and the Blizzards, Jason Ricci & New Blood, The Hoax, Southside Johnny & the Asbury Jukes, Heather Nova
Bospop 2010	Sunday 11 July	Mainstage	The 1.90’s, Texas Hippie Coalition, Uriah Heep, Twisted Sister, Status Quo, Billy Idol, Toto
Bospop 2010	Sunday 11 July	Tent	Nicolie Fermie, Anvil, Michael Schenker Group, Taylor Hawkins & the Coattail Riders, Dweezil Zappa plays Zappa, Ray Manzarek & Robbie Krieger of the Doors
Bospop 2011	Friday 8 July	Mainstage	The 101's, Gianna Nannini, Foreigner, The Faces featuring Mick Hucknall, Journey, Joe Cocker
Bospop 2011	Friday 8 July	Tent	The Resistance Plot, Yasmin, The Answer, Rival Sons, Texas
Bospop 2011	Saturday 9 July	Mainstage	The Dirty Denims, Coldplace, KT Tunstall, Ringo Starr And His All Starr Band, Brian Setzer's Rockabilly Riot, Roxette, Anouk
Bospop 2011	Saturday 9 July	Tent	Harrie & De Gebroeëke Zwiêgelkes, Serena Pryne, The Ultimate Eagles, The Bosshoss, Gregg Allman Band, Roger Hodgson & Band
Bospop 2011	Sunday 10 July	Mainstage	Vanderbuyst, Malina Moye, Jimmy Barnes, Triggerfinger, Thin Lizzy, Black Country Communion, Dream Theater
Bospop 2011	Sunday 10 July	Tent	Stefan Schill, The Juke Joints, Popa Chubby, Philip Sayce, Walter Trout, Riverside
Bospop 2012	Saturday 7 July	Mainstage	Black-Bone, Seether, Beth Hart, Ed Kowalczyk, Wolfmother, Chris Cornell, Lenny Kravitz
Bospop 2012	Saturday 7 July	Tent	Vintage Trouble, The Union, Eli 'Paperboy' Reed, Trombone Shorty, Los Lobos, Los Lonely Boys
Bospop 2012	Sunday 8 July	Mainstage	Powerslave, Jonas & The Massive Attraction, Patti Smith, Tom Jones, The Cult, Gavin DeGraw, Alanis Morissette
Bospop 2012	Sunday 8 July	Tent	The Dunwells, DeWolff, Kenny Wayne Shepherd, Adrenaline Mob, Opeth, The Waterboys
Bospop 2013	Saturday 13 July	Mainstage	The Jacks, The Dutch Eagles, Racoon, Amy Macdonald, Roger Hodgson & Band, Crosby, Stills & Nash
Bospop 2013	Saturday 13 July	Tent	The Pink Floyd Sound, Monophonics, JJ Grey & Mofro, Dana Fuchs Band, Rowwen Hèze
Bospop 2013	Sunday 14 July	Mainstage	Smalltown Nobodies, Kitty, Daisy & Lewis, Within Temptation, George Thorogood & The Destroyers, Golden Earring, ZZ Top
Bospop 2013	Sunday 14 July	Tent	BloYaTop, Tim Christensen & the Damn Crystals, The Fabulous Thunderbirds, Thunder, Steven Wilson
Bospop 2014	Saturday 12 July	Mainstage	Simple Minds, Bløf, Fun Lovin' Criminals, Venice, The Alarm, Heritage Blues Orchestra, The Straits, Kovacs, Sven Hammond Soul, The Phermones, Eric Steckel
Bospop 2014	Sunday 13 July	Mainstage	John Fogerty, Triggerfinger, Extreme, Paul Carrack, Southside Johnny and the Asbury Jukes, The Winery Dogs etc.
Bospop 2015	Saturday 11 July	Mainstage	Navarone, Racoon, Anastacia, Melissa Etheridge, Gary Clark Jr., Ed Kowalczyk, ZZ Top
Bospop 2015	Saturday 11 July	Tent	Luminize, Layla Zoe, Band of Friends, Fish, Novastar, Caro Emerald
Bospop 2015	Sunday 12 July	Mainstage	Pauw, The London Souls, Black Label Society, Jools Holland and His Rhythm & Blues Orchestra, Europe, Dream Theater, Steven Wilson
Bospop 2015	Sunday 12 July	Tent	The Gentle Storm, Danko Jones, Dizzy Mizz Lizzy, Thunder, Anathema
Bospop 2016	Saturday 9 July	Mainstage	Nena (main artist), Midas and band-friends, Vido and the Sint Antonius orchestra, Eisbrecher, The Waterboys, Flogging Molly, The Cranberries, Seal
Bospop 2016	Saturday 9 July	Tent	Selah Sue, DeWolff, Maria Mena, Walter Trout, Kovacs
Bospop 2016	Sunday 10 July	Mainstage	Kensington (main artist), CC Smugglers, Trixie Whitley, Counting Crows, Elvis Costello, The Mavericks, Santana
Bospop 2016	Sunday 10 July	Tent	K's Choice, Def Americans, The Howlin', SIMO, The Boss Hoss, Steve Vai
Bospop 2017	Saturday 8 July	Mainstage	Doe Maar (main artist), Beth Hart, The Pretenders, Vintage Trouble, BLOF, Black Star Riders, Stevie Nimmo Trio
Bospop 2017	Saturday 8 July	Tent	The Magpie Salute, Tyler Bryant and the Shakedown, Delv!s, The Black Sorrows
Bospop 2017	Sunday 9 July	Mainstage	Madness (main artist), Anouk, Dropkick Murphys, Anastacia, Wolfmother, Therapy?, The Sore Losers
Bospop 2017	Sunday 9 July	Tent	Supertramp, Roger Hodgson, Gogol Bordello, Airbourne, My Baby
Bospop 2018	Saturday 14 July	Mainstage	Simple Minds (main artist), A-Ha, UB40, Gary Clark Jr., Racoon, John Hiatt, Con Brio
Bospop 2018	Saturday 14 July	Tent	The Mavericks, Paul Carrack, Venice, Steve Earle, Graveyard, The Band of Heathens
Bospop 2018	Sunday 15 July	Mainstage	Zucchero (main artist), Live, Billy Idol, Novastar, Colin Macleod, The Cadillac Three, Jetbone
Bospop 2018	Sunday 15 July	Tent	Southside Johnny & the Asbury Jukes, Jonathan Jeremiah, Lukas Nelson & the Promise of the Real, Particle Kid, King King, Nona
Bospop 2019	Friday 12 July	Mainstage	Toto (main artist), Richard Ashcroft, James Morrison, Matt Simons
Bospop 2019	Friday 12 July	Tent	Kodaline, The Charlatans, My Baby, Wille & the Bandits
Bospop 2019	Saturday 13 July	Mainstage	John Fogerty (main artist), Skunk Anansie, Flogging Molly, Daryl Hall & John Oates, The Cat Empire, Living Colour, Cordovas
Bospop 2019	Saturday 13 July	Tent	John Butler Trio, Danny Vera, Kovács, Jimmy Barnes, The Doors Alive, The Lachy Doley Group
Bospop 2019	Sunday 14 July	Mainstage	Nile Rodgers & Chic, The Specials, Joe Jackson, Rowwen Hèze, Foreigner, Level 42, Jessica Wilde
Bospop 2019	Sunday 14 July	Tent	Al McKay's Earth, Wind & Fire Experience, Chris Robinson Brotherhood, Rival Sons, The White Buffalo, Marc Broussard
Bospop 2022	Friday 8 July	Mainstage	Skunk Anansie, Cory Henry & The Funk Apostles
Bospop 2022	Friday 8 July	Tent	Melissa Etheridge, Mell & Vintage Future
Bospop 2022	Saturday 9 July	Mainstage	Sting
Bospop 2022	Saturday 9 July	Tent	The Record Company
Bospop 2022	Sunday 10 July	Mainstage	Beth Hart
Bospop 2022	Sunday 10 July	Tent	Robert Jon & The Wreck

== Gallery ==
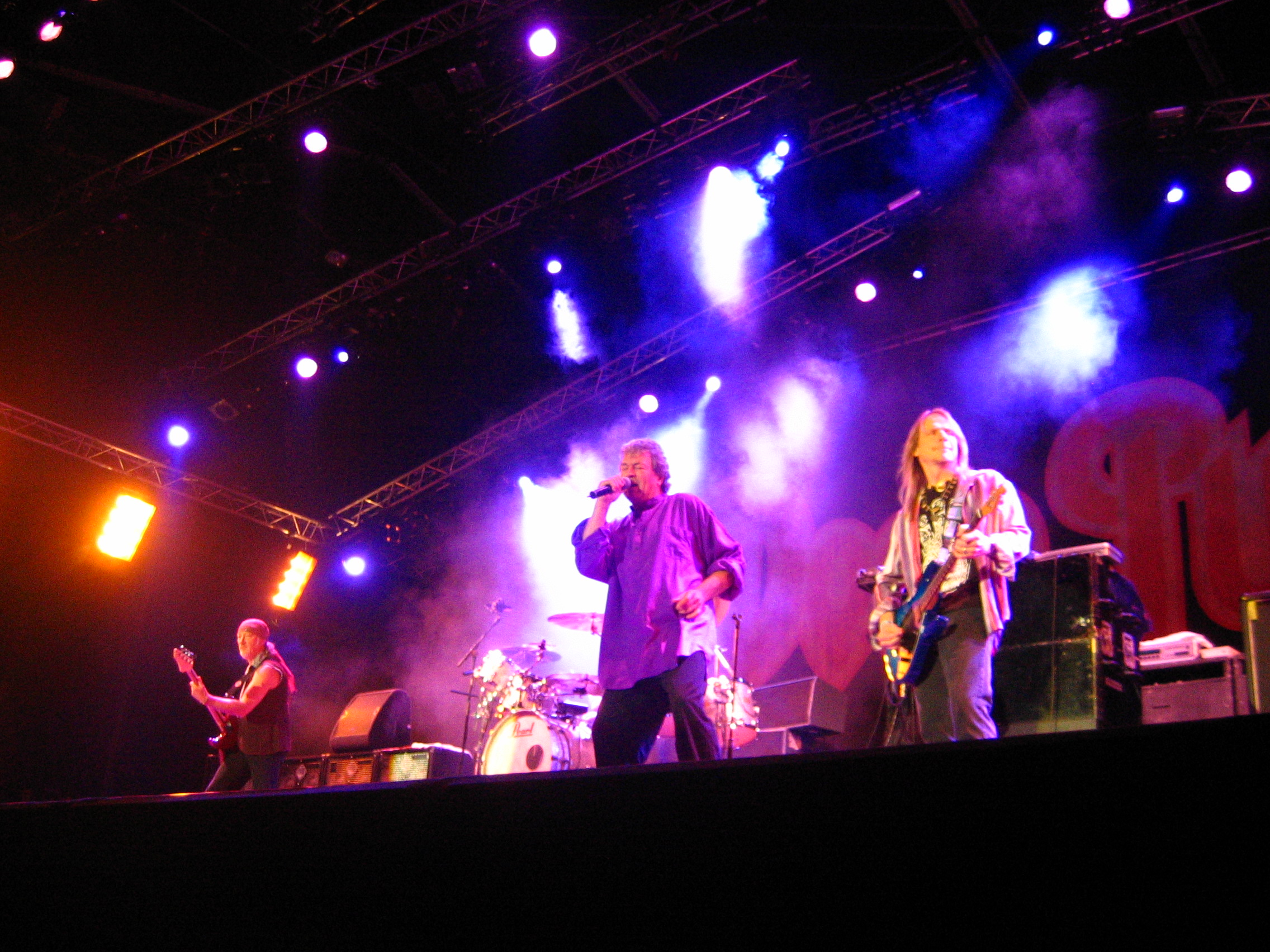
Deep Purple, 2004

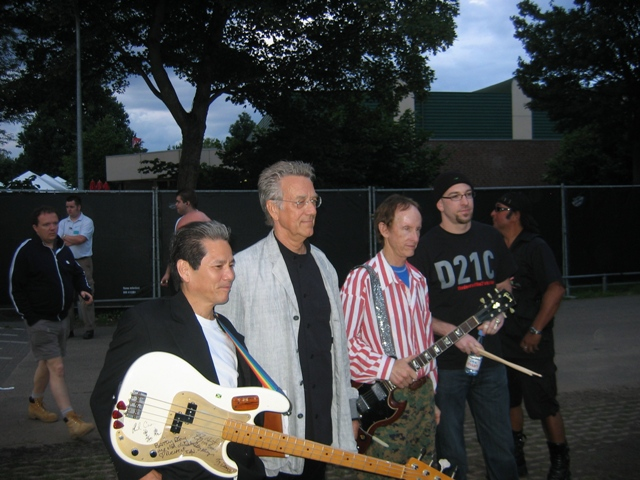
The Doors of the 21st Century, 2004

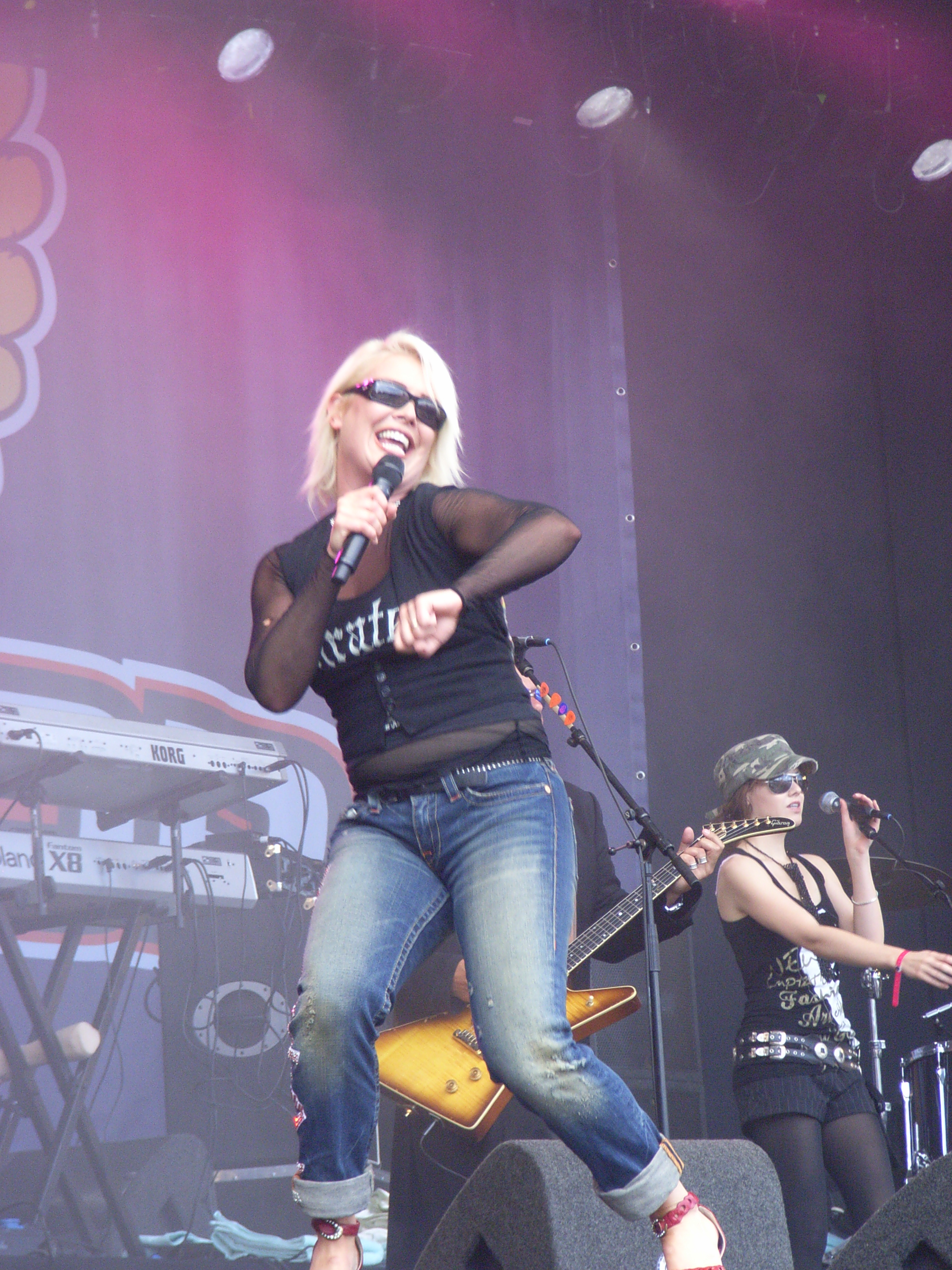
Kim Wilde, 2007

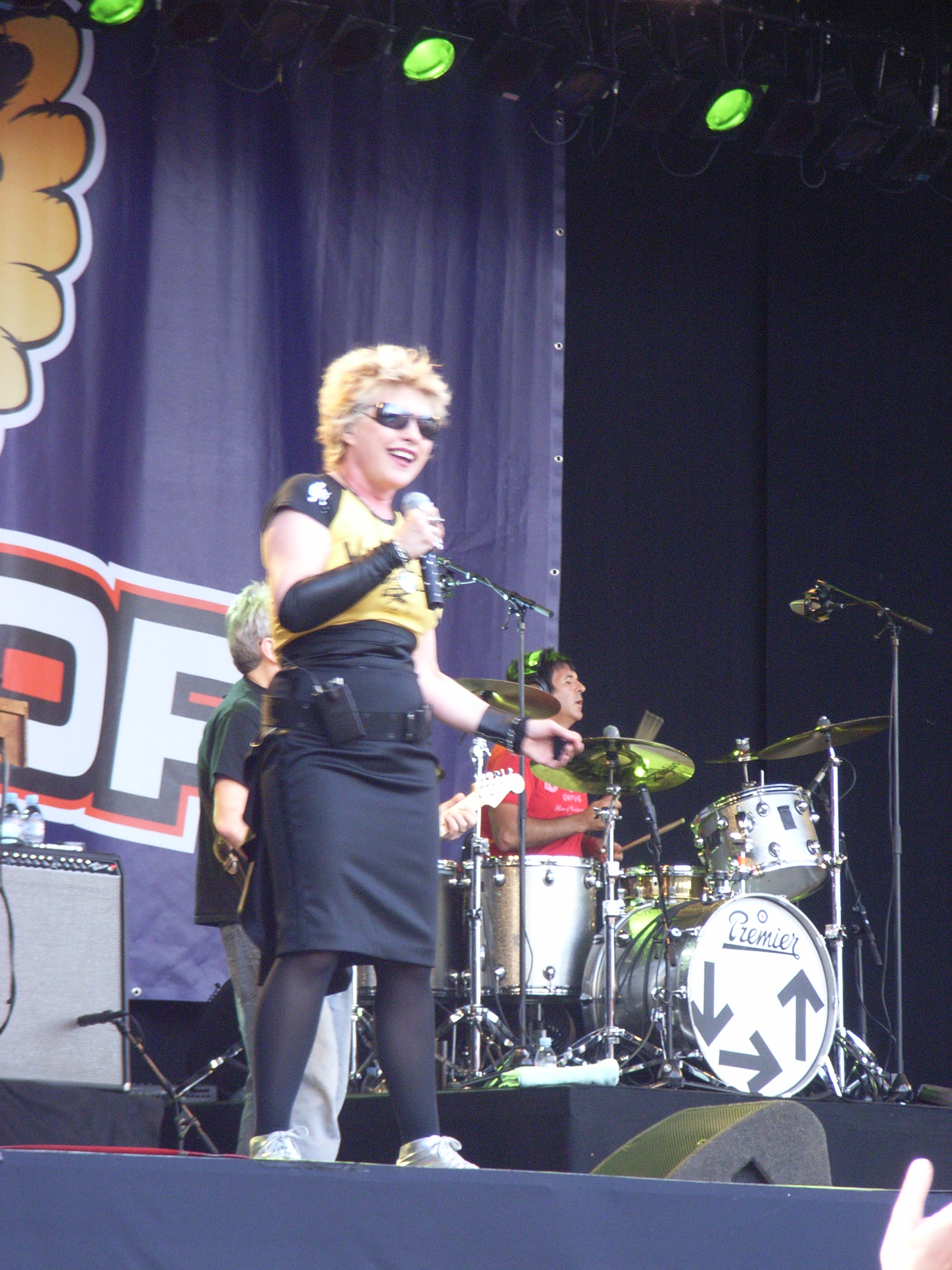
Blondie, 2007

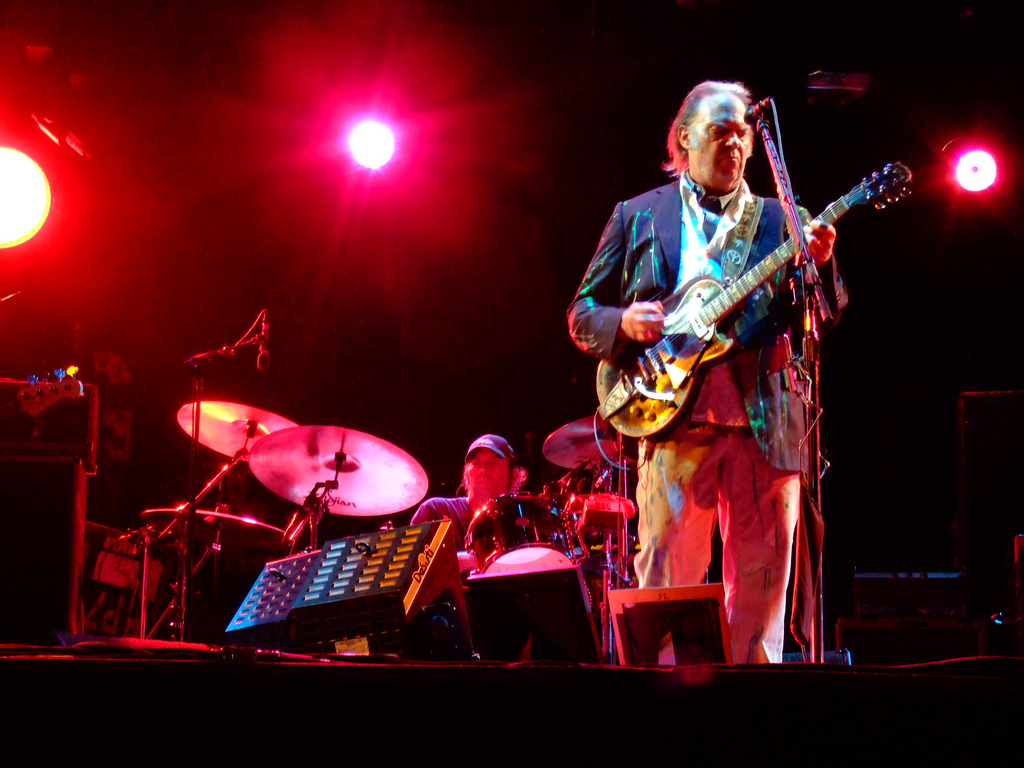
Neil Young, 2008

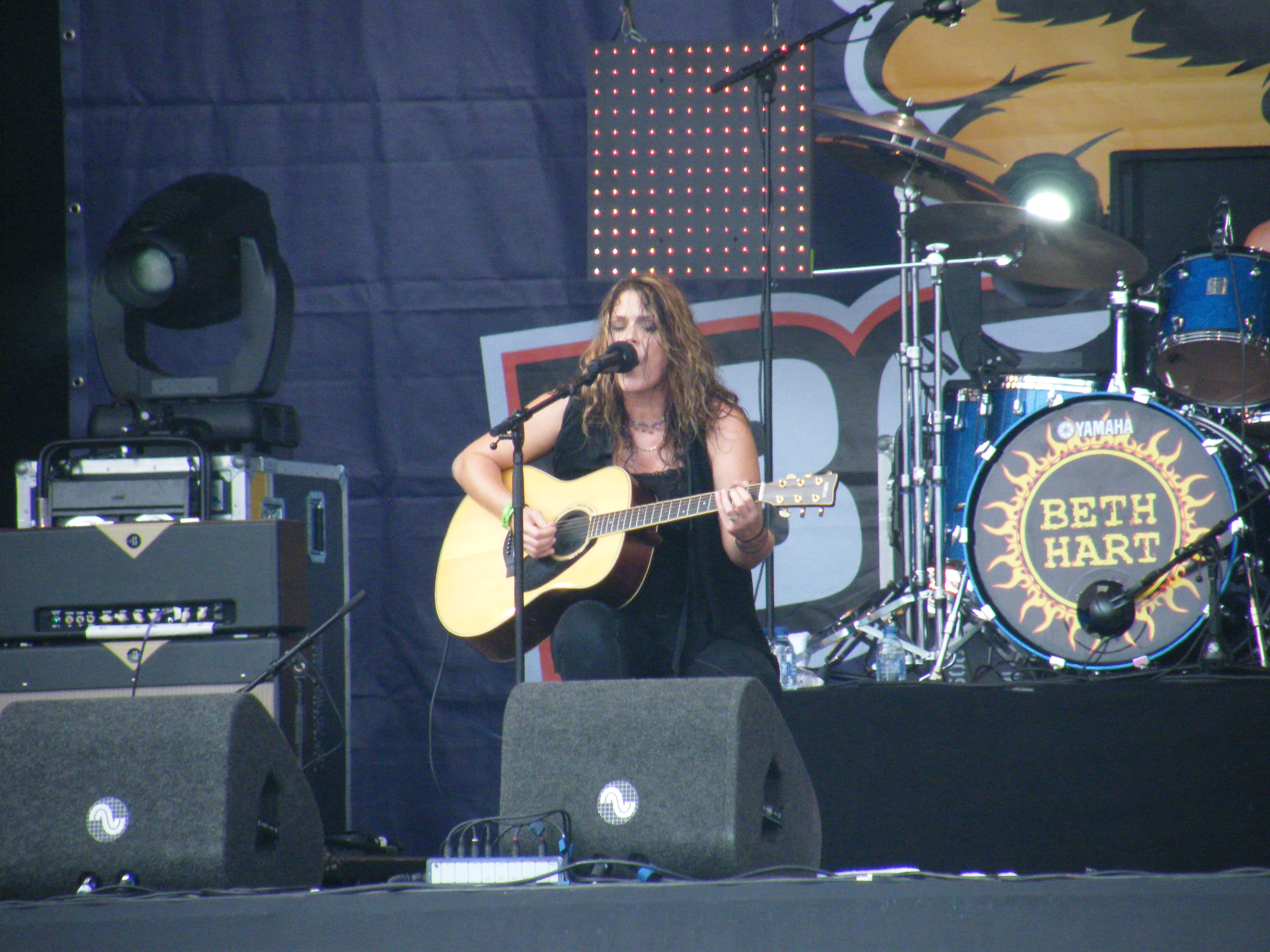
Beth Hart, 2009

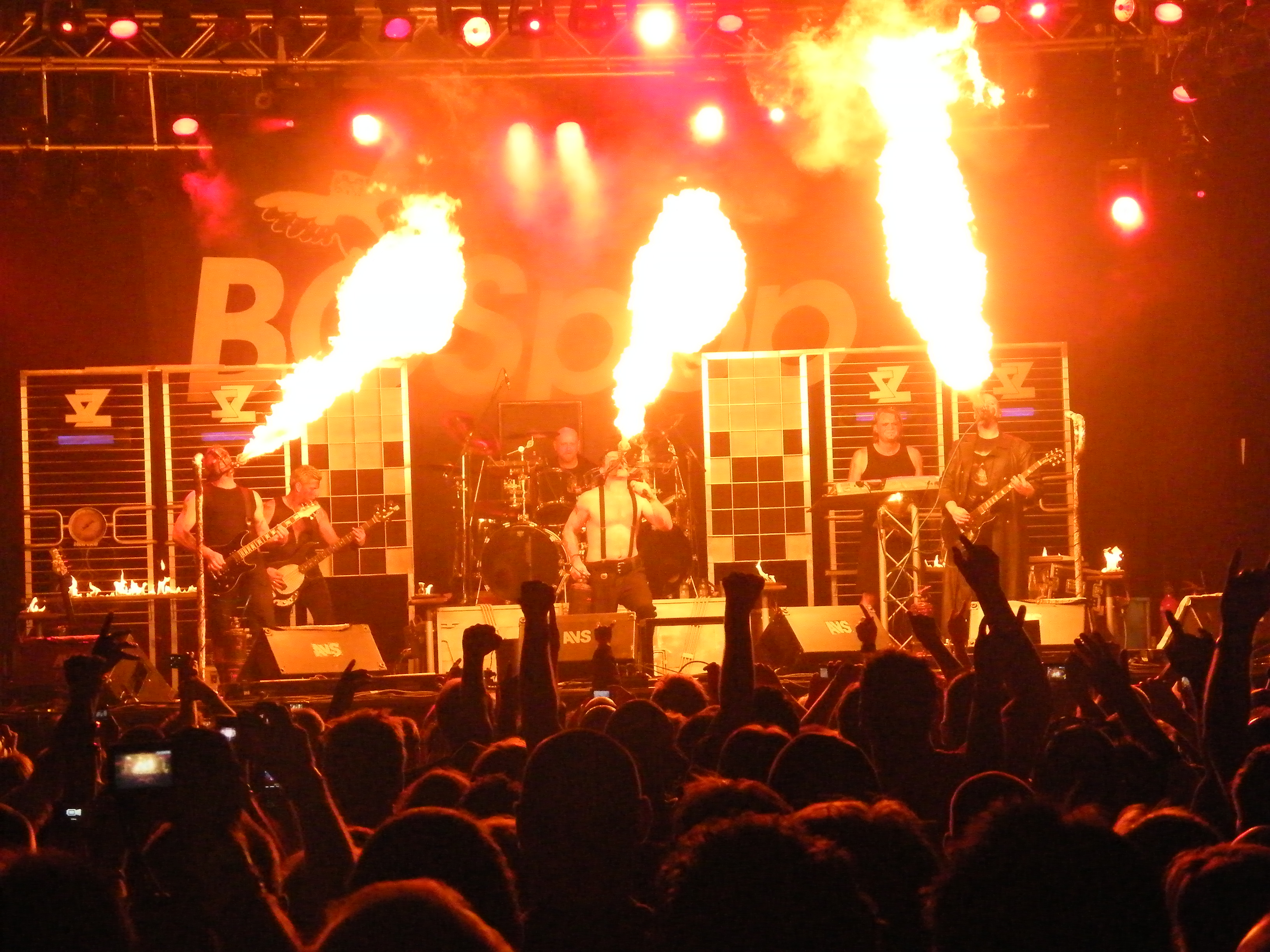
Stahlzeit, 2009

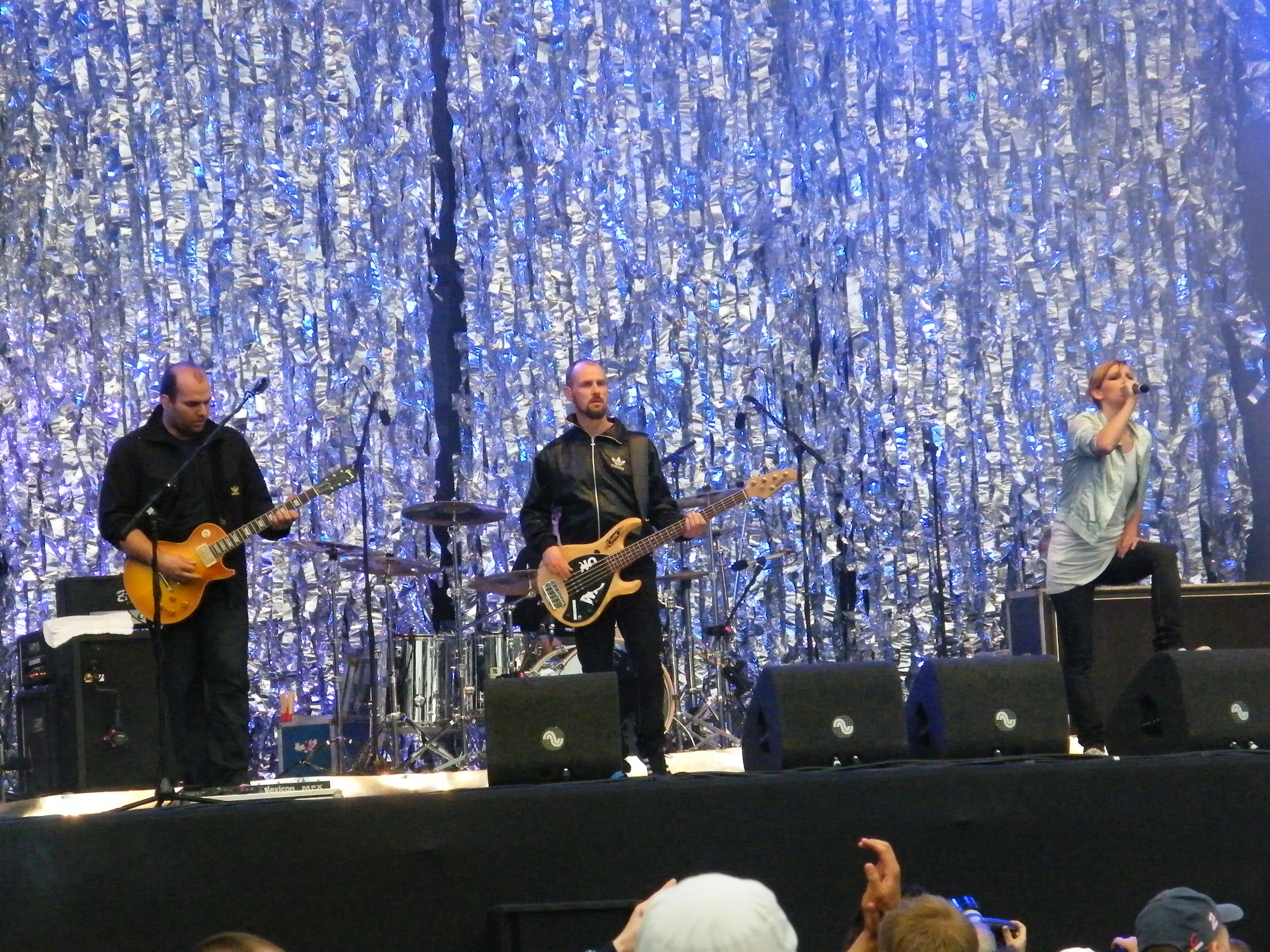
Guano Apes, 2009

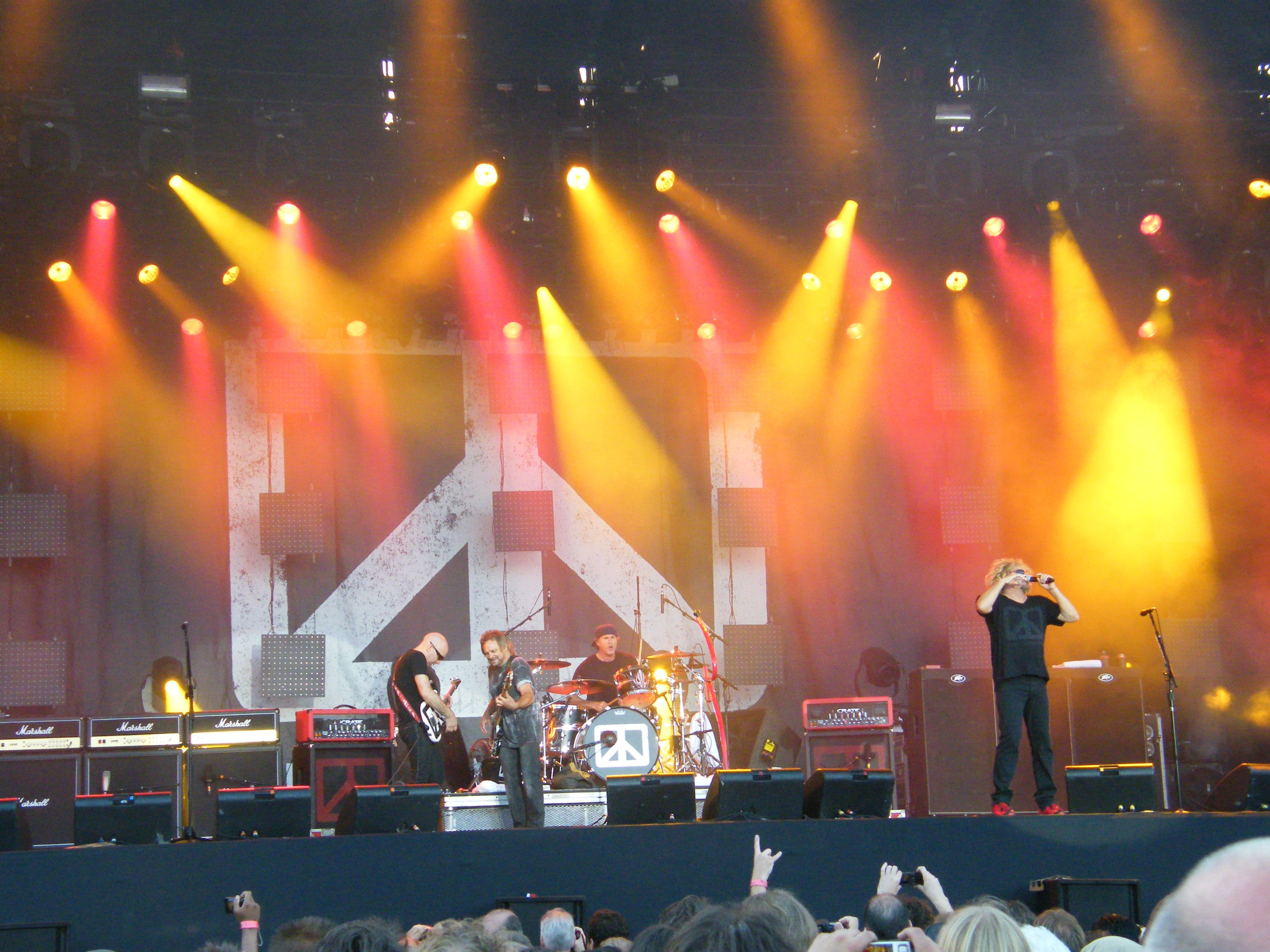
Chickenfoot, 2009

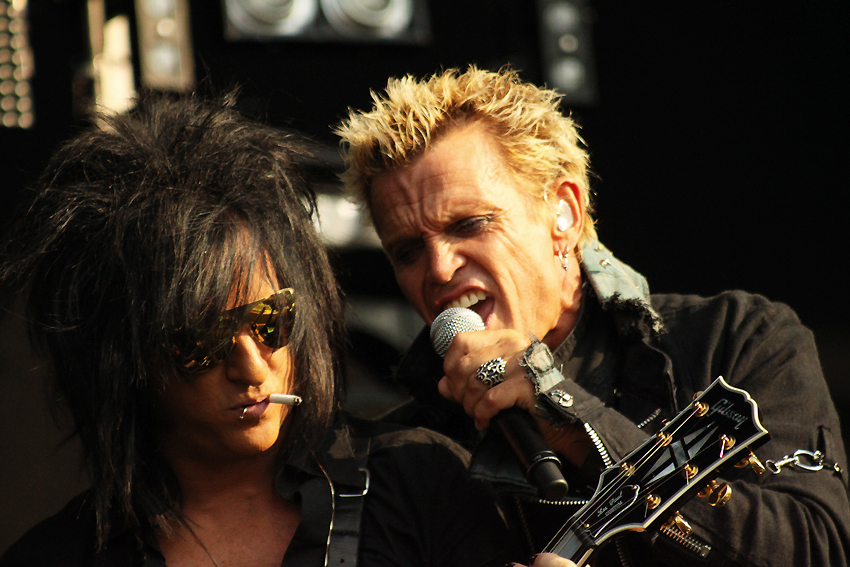
Steve Stevens en Billy Idol, 2010

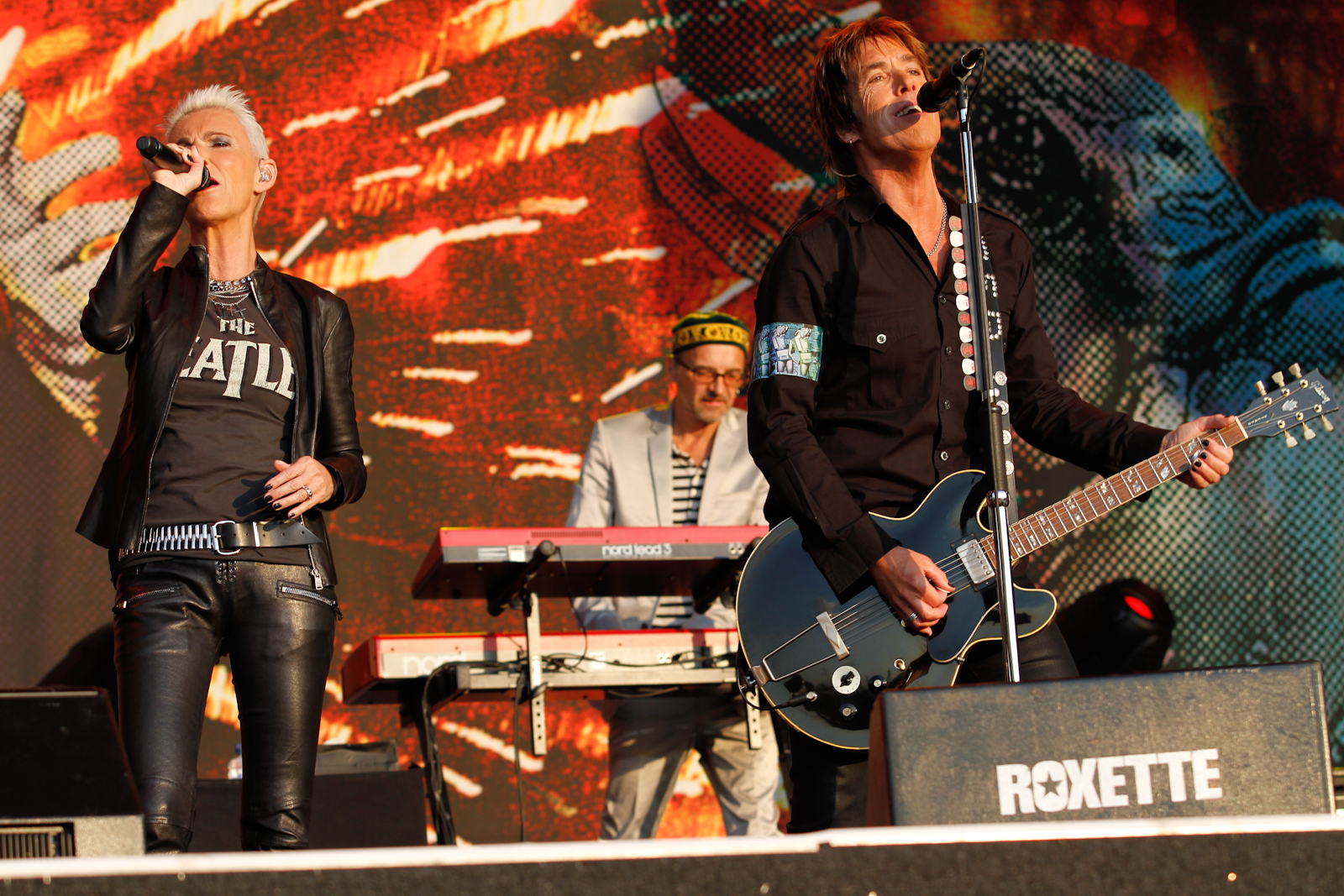
Roxette, 2011

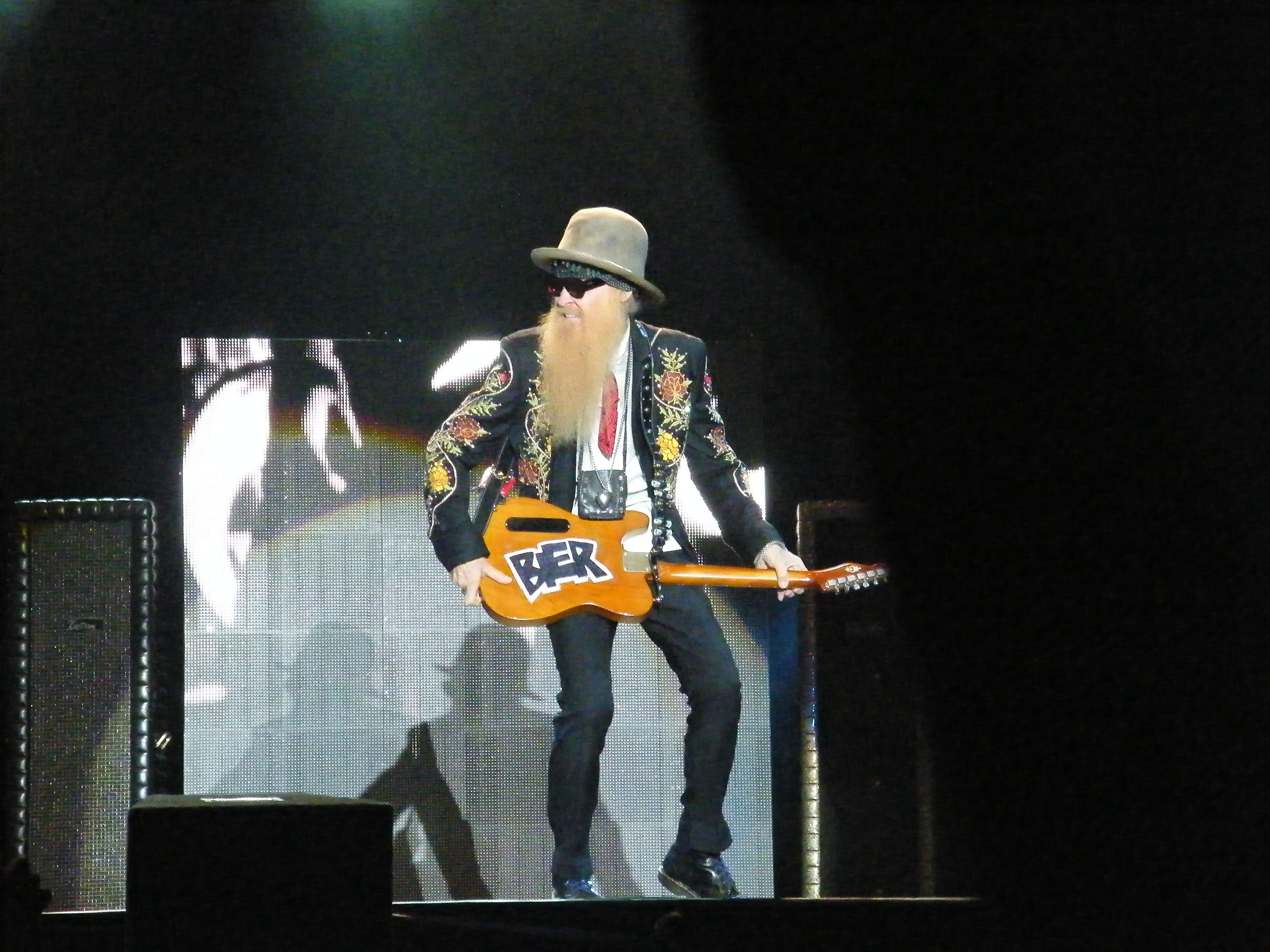
Billy Gibbons van ZZ Top in 2013
