= Cover to Cover (The Jeff Healey Band album) =

Studio album by the Jeff Healey Band
- Released: 13 June 1995
- Recorded: 1994–1995
- Studios: A&M Studios (Hollywood, California): Brooklyn Recording Studio (Los Angeles, California); The Hit Factory (New York City, New York); Forte Studios, Sounds Interchange and Metalworks Studio (Toronto, Ontario, Canada)
- Genre: Blues rock
- Length: 57:26
- Label: Arista
- Producers: Thom Panunzio, the Jeff Healey Band

The Jeff Healey Band chronology
Feel This (1992)	Cover to Cover (1995)	Get Me Some (2000)

Singles from Cover to Cover
- 1. "I Got a Line on You" Released: June 1995; 2. "Angel" Released: September 1995; 3. "Stuck in the Middle with You" Released: December 1995

Professional ratings
Review scores
Source	Rating
AllMusic	2/5 stars
Entertainment Weekly	B−

Cover to Cover is the fourth album by the Jeff Healey Band. It is an album of cover songs, released in 1995.

== Track listing ==
No.	Title	Writer(s)	Original Artist	Length
1.	"Shapes of Things"	Paul Samwell-Smith, Keith Relf	The Yardbirds	4:39
2.	"Freedom"	Jimi Hendrix	Jimi Hendrix	3:34
3.	"Yer Blues"	John Lennon, Paul McCartney	The Beatles	4:31
4.	"Stop Breakin' Down"	Robert Johnson	Robert Johnson	4:21
5.	"Angel"	Jimi Hendrix	Jimi Hendrix	4:30
6.	"Evil"	Willie Dixon	Howlin' Wolf	3:49
7.	"Stuck in the Middle with You"	Gerry Rafferty, Joe Egan	Stealers Wheel	4:06
8.	"I Got a Line on You"	Randy California	Spirit	3:13
9.	"Run Through the Jungle"	J.C. Fogerty	Creedence Clearwater Revival	4:24
10.	"As the Years Go Passing By"	Deadric Malone	Albert King	6:47
11.	"I'm Ready"	Willie Dixon	Muddy Waters	3:35
12.	"Badge"	Eric Clapton, George Harrison	Cream	3:57
13.	"Communication Breakdown"	Jimmy Page, John Paul Jones, John Bonham	Led Zeppelin	3:17
14.	"Me and My Crazy Self"	Henry Glover, Syd Nathan	Lonnie Johnson	2:50
Total length:				57:26

2002 US reissue
No.	Title	Writer(s)	Length
1.	"Shapes of Things"	Samwell-Smith, Relf	4:34
2.	"Stop Breakin' Down"	Johnson	4:20
3.	"Highway 49"	Big Joe Williams	3:34
4.	"As the Years Go Passing By"	Malone	6:47
5.	"I'm Ready"	Dixon	3:33
6.	"Evil"	Dixon	3:48
7.	"Stuck in the Middle With You"	Rafferty, Egan	4:06
8.	"Angel"	Hendrix	4:29
9.	"The Moon Is Full"	Gwendolyn Collins	4:06
10.	"Yer Blues"	Lennon, McCartney	4:31
11.	"Communication Breakdown"	Page, Jones, Bonham	3:17
12.	"Me and My Crazy Self"	Glover, Nathan	2:49

== Production ==
- Roy Lott – executive producer
- The Jeff Healey Band – producers
- Thom Panunzio – producer, mixing (1, 3–14)
- Tom Stephen – mixing (2)
- Richard Chycki – engineer
- Ed Krautner – second engineer
- Glen Marchese – second engineer
- Chad Munsey – second engineer
- Keith Ohman – second engineer
- Ronnie Rivera – second engineer
- Greg Calbi – mastering at Masterdisk (New York, NY)
- Angela Skouras – art direction
- Barrie Wentzell – photography

== Personnel ==
The Jeff Healey Band

- Jeff Healey – lead vocals, guitars
- Joe Rockman – bass guitar, backing vocals
- Tom Stephen – drums, backing vocals

Additional Musicians

- Paul Shaffer – keyboards (4, 5, 9, 12)
- Denis Keldie – keyboards (7)
- Roy Bittan – keyboards (8, 10, 11)
- Pat Rush – additional electric guitars (1, 4, 6, 7, 9, 11, 13)
- Art Avalos – percussion (5, 8, 9)
- Rick Lazar – percussion (8)
- Jerome Godboo – blues harp (6, 8)
- John Popper – harmonica (13)
- Mischke Butler – backing vocals (5)
- Amanda Marshall – backing vocals (5)
- Stevie Vain – backing vocals (5, 9)
- Kipp Lennon – backing vocals (8)
- Mark Lennon – backing vocals (8)
- Michael Lennon – backing vocals (8)

== Charts ==
=== Album ===
Chart (1995)	Peak position
US Billboard Blues Albums	1
Australian Albums Chart	80
Canadian RPM 100 Albums	44
Dutch Mega Album Top 100	50
Swedish Albums Chart	23
Swiss Albums Chart	31
UK Albums Chart	50

=== Singles ===
Year	Song	Chart	Position
1995	"I Got a Line on You "	RPM 100 Hit Tracks	34
1995	"Angel"	RPM 100 Hit Tracks	33
1995	"Stuck in the Middle with You"	Billboard Mainstream Rock	39
1995	"Stuck in the Middle with You"	RPM 100 Hit Tracks	33
