= See the Light (The Jeff Healey Band album) =

Studio album by the Jeff Healey Band
- Released: September 13, 1988
- Recorded: 1988
- Studios: The Complex (Los Angeles, California)
- Genre: Blues rock
- Length: 49:31
- Label: Arista
- Producers: Jimmy Iovine; Greg Ladanyi; Thom Panunzio

The Jeff Healey Band chronology
| See the Light (1988) | Hell to Pay (1990) |

See the Light is the debut album by the Jeff Healey Band, released in 1988. It was No. 50 on the top 100 albums in Canada in 1989, and was the sixth best-selling Cancon album in Canada of 1989. In 1990, it was nominated for the Juno Award for "Album of the Year".

== Critical reception ==
Professional ratings
Review scores
| Source | Rating |
|---|---|
| AllMusic | 4/5 stars |
| The Encyclopedia of Popular Music | 4/5 stars |

The Globe and Mail concluded that Healey's "performance is solid throughout, but his voice lacks the range, depth of tone and distinctiveness to leave a really strong impression."

== Track listing ==
| No. | Title | Writer(s) | Length |
|---|---|---|---|
| 1. | "Confidence Man" | John Hiatt | 3:12 |
| 2. | "My Little Girl" | Jeff Healey | 3:10 |
| 3. | "River of No Return" | Keith Reid, Jon Tiven, Sally Tiven | 3:31 |
| 4. | "Don't Let Your Chance Go By" | Healey | 3:20 |
| 5. | "Angel Eyes" | Hiatt, Fred Koller | 5:19 |
| 6. | "Nice Problem to Have" | Robbie Blunt, Jeff Healey, Joe Rockman, Tom Stephen | 4:50 |
| 7. | "Someday, Someway" | Martin Briley, Danny Tate | 3:28 |
| 8. | "I Need to Be Loved" | Healey | 3:43 |
| 9. | "Blue Jean Blues" | Frank Beard, Billy Gibbons, Dusty Hill | 5:39 |
| 10. | "That's What They Say" | Healey | 4:27 |
| 11. | "Hideaway" | Freddie King, Sonny Thompson | 4:26 |
| 12. | "See the Light" | Healey | 4:26 |

== Personnel ==
The Jeff Healey Band

- Jeff Healey – lead vocals, electric guitars, harmonica (4)
- Joe Rockman – bass guitar, backing vocals (7)
- Tom Stephen – drums

Additional musicians

- Benmont Tench – keyboards (1, 2, 8, 10)
- Robbie Blunt – electric guitars (6, 11)
- Bobbye Hall – percussion (7)
- Marilyn Martin – backing vocals (3, 5, 8)
- Timothy B. Schmit – backing vocals (3, 5, 8)
- Kipp Lennon – backing vocals (7)
- Mark Lennon – backing vocals (7)
- Michael Lennon – backing vocals (7)
- Pat Lennon – backing vocals (7)

Production

- Greg Ladanyi – producer (1–8, 10–12), mixing (1–8, 10–12)
- Thom Panunzio – associate producer (1–8, 10–12), engineer, producer (9), mixing (9)
- Jimmy Iovine – producer (9)
- Paul Dieter – assistant engineer
- Sharon Rice – assistant engineer
- Duane Seykora – assistant engineer
- Ron Lewter – mastering
- Doug Sax – mastering
- The Mastering Lab (Hollywood, California) – mastering location
- Debbie Sommer – production assistant
- Maude Gilman – art direction
- Darius Anthony – photography
- Jas Obrecht – sleeve notes

== Charts ==
| Chart (1989) | Peak position |
|---|---|
| Australian ARIA Albums Chart | 33 |
| Canadian RPM 100 | 25 |
| Dutch Mega Album Top 100 | 23 |
| German Albums Charts | 33 |
| NZ RIANZ Albums Chart | 17 |
| Swedish Albums Chart | 32 |
| Swiss Albums Charts | 13 |
| UK Albums Chart | 58 |
| US Billboard 200 | 22 |

== Certifications ==
Certifications for See the Light
| Region | Certification | Certified units/sales |
|---|---|---|
| Australia (ARIA) | Gold | 35,000^{^} |
| Canada (Music Canada) | 3× Platinum | 300,000^{^} |
| United Kingdom (BPI) | Silver | 60,000^{^} |
| United States (RIAA) | Platinum | 1,000,000^{^} |
^{^} Shipments figures based on certification alone.
