= Beef (disambiguation) =

Beef is the meat from cattle.

Beef may also refer to:

== People ==
- Beef (Nitro Girl), a stage name of professional wrestler Rhonda Sing with the Nitro Girls
- Beef (rapper), American rapper
- "Beef", nickname of English golfer Andrew Johnston

== Entertainment ==
- Beef (band), a Dutch reggae fusion band
- Beef (comics), a character in the Marvel universe
- Beef (2003 film), a documentary film about hip hop feuds, also called beefs
- Beef (2025 film), a musical drama film
- Beef (TV series), a 2023 Netflix comedy drama series
  - Beef (soundtrack), the 2023 soundtrack album of the series
- "Beef" (The Bear), a second-season episode of The Bear
- "Beef" (Law & Order: Special Victims Unit), an eleventh-season episode of Law & Order: Special Victims Unit
- "Beef", a 1990 track by Boogie Down Productions taken from Edutainment
- "Beef", a song by Nas from the album King's Disease III (2022)

== Other uses ==
- "Beef", quarrying term for fibrous calcite veins found within some types of mudstones
- "Beef", the primary essential part of a thing, the absence of which could induce the question, "Where's the beef?"
- "Beef", a term for a disdain or feud, especially in hip-hop rivalries
- Beef Creek, a stream in South Dakota
- Big Explosives Experimental Facility
- British Energy Efficiency Federation
