= Mess of Blues =

Mess of Blues may refer to:

- Mess of Blues (Johnny Hodges and Wild Bill Davis album), 1964
- Mess of Blues (Jeff Healy album), 2008
