= Get Me Some =

Get Me Some may refer to:

- "Get Me Some" (song), a 2003 song by Mercury4
- Get Me Some (album), a 2000 album by The Jeff Healey Band
