= Beefsteak (disambiguation) =

A beefsteak is a steak cut from beef cattle.

Beefsteak may also refer to:

- Perilla, beefsteak plant, also known as perilla and shiso
- Beefsteak (tomato), a name given to a type of large, meaty tomatoes
- Fistulina hepatica, beefsteak fungus
- Beefsteak mushroom, an alternate name for the false morel
- Beefsteak (banquet), a celebratory dinner, generally held in the New York City area
- Beefsteak Breads, a former brand name of Old HB; sold to Grupo Bimbo.
- Beefsteak Club, a type of gentlemen's private club
- Beefsteak Nazi, a term used to describe communists and socialists who joined the Nazi Party

== See also ==
- Beef (disambiguation)
- Steak (disambiguation)
