= Stake =

A stake is a large wooden or metal implement designed to be driven into the ground and may refer to:

== Tools ==
- Archer's stake, a defensive stake carried by medieval longbowmen
- Survey stakes, markers used by surveyors
- Sudis (stake) (Latin for "stake"), a fortification carried by Roman legionaries
- Torture stake, a method of execution similar to crucifixion, tying or nailing the victim to an upright pole in lieu of a cross
- Stake, a specialized, polished, anvil-like tool used for metalworking such as planishing
- Steel fence post, a kind of stake
- Side stakes used on flatcars etc

== Entertainment ==
- Stake: Fortune Fighters, a 2003 video game
- The Stake, a 1915 silent short film
- "The Stake", a 1977 song by The Steve Miller Band from Book of Dreams
- Stakes (miniseries), a Cartoon Network miniseries, aired as part of the seventh season of Adventure Time
- Stake (band)

== People ==
- Andrew K. Stake (died 1876), American politician from Maryland
- Dagnija Staķe (born 1951), Latvian politician
- Robert E. Stake (born 1927), Professor Emeritus of Education at the University of Illinois, Urbana-Champaign

== Betting and gambling ==
- Stakes race, a type of horse race
  - Graded stakes race

== Companies ==
- Stake (platform), an Australian financial services company
- Stake.com, an online casino
- @stake, a computer services company

== Other uses ==
- Equity (finance), the part of a company or business owned by a shareholder, sometimes referred to as stake
- Stake (Latter Day Saints), a regional organization in some Latter Day Saint churches
- Hill of Stake, a hill on the boundary between North Ayrshire and Renfrewshire, Scotland
- Proof of stake

== See also ==
- Staking (manufacturing), a process for connecting two components
- Staker
- Staking (disambiguation)
  - Poker staking, financially backing a player
- Steak (disambiguation)
