= Hell to Pay (The Jeff Healey Band album) =

Studio album by the Jeff Healey Band
- Released: May 29, 1990
- Recorded: January–February 1990
- Studio: Le Studio, Morin-Heights, Quebec
- Genre: Rock
- Length: 49:56
- Label: Arista
- Producer: Ed Stasium

The Jeff Healey Band chronology
See the Light (1988)	Hell to Pay (1990)	Feel This (1992)

Professional ratings
Review scores
Source	Rating
Allmusic	3/5 stars
Select	4/5

Hell to Pay is the second album by the Jeff Healey Band. It was released in 1990, and was one of the top 25 best-selling albums in Canada. In 1991. it was nominated for a Juno Award for "Album of the Year".

Guest musicians on the album include George Harrison, Jeff Lynne, Bobby Whitlock, Paul Shaffer, and Mark Knopfler.

The album was recorded at Le Studio in Morin Heights, Quebec, Canada in January and February 1990.

== Track listing ==
No.	Title	Writer(s)	Length
1.	"Full Circle"	Jeff Healey, Joe Rockman, Tom Stephen	4:11
2.	"I Think I Love You Too Much"	Mark Knopfler	6:27
3.	"I Can't Get My Hands on You"	Healey	3:40
4.	"How Long Can a Man Be Strong"	Steve Cropper, Jimmy Scott	4:25
5.	"Let It All Go"	John Hiatt	3:42
6.	"Hell to Pay"	Healey, Rockman, Stephen	3:53
7.	"While My Guitar Gently Weeps"	George Harrison	5:13
8.	"Something to Hold On To"	Healey	3:56
9.	"How Much"	Greg Sutton, Danny Tate	4:46
10.	"Highway of Dreams"	Healey, Rockman, Stephen	4:47
11.	"Life Beyond the Sky"	Healey, Rockman, Stephen	4:56
Total length:			49:56

== Production ==
- Ed Stasium – producer, mixing, remixing (5)
- Paul Hamingson – engineer, mix assistant, remix assistant (5)
- Simon Pressey – assistant engineer
- Michael White – remix assistant (5)
- Recorded and mixed at Le Studio (Morin Heights)
- "Let It Go" remixed at Right Track Recording (New York City, NY)
- Greg Calbi – mastering at Sterling Sound (New York City, NY)
- Mitchell Cohen – A&R
- Maude Gilman – art direction
- Dimo Safari – photography
- Lynne Ryan – grooming, styling
- Forte Records & Productions, Ltd. – management

== Personnel ==
The Jeff Healey Band

- Jeff Healey – lead vocals, guitars
- Joe Rockman – bass guitar, backing vocals
- Tom Stephen – drums

Additional Musicians

- Paul Shaffer – keyboards
- Bobby Whitlock – Hammond B3 organ (1, 2, 4, 5)
- Mark Knopfler – guitar (2), backing vocals (2)
- George Harrison – acoustic guitar (7), backing vocals (7)
- Jeff Lynne – acoustic guitar (7), backing vocals (7)
- Sass Jordan – backing vocals
- Kathleen Dyson – backing vocals

== Chart positions and certifications ==
=== Album ===
Year	Chart	Peak Position
1990	US Billboard 200	27
1990	Canadian RPM 100	5
1990	UK Albums Chart	18
1990	NZ RIANZ Albums Chart	5
1990	Australian ARIA Albums Chart	20
1990	Norwegian VG-lista	9
1990	Swedish Albums Chart	10
1990	Dutch Mega Album Top 100	16
1990	German Albums Charts	17
1990	Swiss Albums Charts	16

=== Singles ===
Year	Song	Chart	Peak Position
1990	"I Think I Love You Too Much"	US Billboard Mainstream Rock	5
1990	"I Think I Love You Too Much"	Canadian RPM 100	5
1990	"I Think I Love You Too Much"	NZ RIANZ Singles Chart	43
1990	"I Think I Love You Too Much"	Dutch Single Top 100	43
1990	"While My Guitar Gently Weeps"	Canadian RPM 100	27
1990	"While My Guitar Gently Weeps"	UK Singles Chart	85
1990	"While My Guitar Gently Weeps"	NZ RIANZ Singles Chart	25
1990	"Full Circle"	US Billboard Mainstream Rock	16
1990	"Full Circle"	Canadian RPM 100	72
1991	"How Long Can a Man Be Strong"	US Billboard Mainstream Rock	34
1991	"How Long Can a Man Be Strong"	Canadian RPM 100	8
1991	"How Much"	Canadian RPM 100	32

=== Certifications ===
Country	Certification	Sales
Canada (Music Canada)	2 × Platinum	200,000+
United Kingdom (BPI)	Silver	60,000+
United States (RIAA)	Gold	500,000+
