= Songs from the Road (Jeff Healey album) =

Live album by Jeff Healey
- Released: July 24, 2009
- Recorded: Norway, August 5, 2006, London, Mat 20, 2007, Toronto, November 15, 2007
- Genre: Blues, rock, pop rock
- Length: 56:57
- Label: Ruf
- Producer: Alec Fraser

Jeff Healey chronology
Mess of Blues (2008)	Songs from the Road (2009)

Professional ratings
Review scores
Source	Rating
AllMusic	3/5 stars
Classic Rock	7/10 stars

Songs from the Road is a posthumous released live blues album by Jeff Healey. It was released in July, 2009. This album was released over a year after his death, and contains hits and covers. As noted by one reviewer, "...the blind musician will be remembered best for playing searing guitar on his lap, looking like a pedal steel guitar man gone mad. Songs from the Road...captures Healey's gift for energizing rock and blues tunes with powerful, sometimes blistering guitar work. It's a talent that occasionally sneaks up on the listener." Randy Bachman was invited to join the band on stage on one song, Hoochie Coochie Man.

== Track listing ==
1. "I Think I Love You Too Much" (Mark Knopfler) – 5:40
2. "I'm Ready" (Willie Dixon) – 5:22
3. "Stop Breaking Down" (Robert Johnson) – 5:58
4. "Angel Eyes" (Fred Koller, John Hiatt) – 5:55
5. "Come Together" (John Lennon, Paul McCartney) – 5:23
6. "Hoochie Coochie Man" (Dixon) – 7:10
7. "White Room" (Jack Bruce, Pete Brown) – 5:36
8. "While My Guitar Gently Weeps" (George Harrison) – 5:14
9. "Whipping Post" (Gregg Allman) – 5:59
10. "Teach Your Children Well" (Graham Nash) – 2:49
11. "Santa Bring My Baby Back to Me" (Aaron Schroeder, Claude DeMetrius) – 2:10

== Band members ==
- Jeff Healey – guitar, lead vocals on 1-4, 6, 8, 10, 11
- Dan Nordermeer – guitar, backing vocals
- Alec Fraser – bass, lead vocals on track 7, backing vocals, producer, mixing
- Dave Murphy – keyboards, lead vocals on tracks 5 and 9, backing vocals, harmonica on track 6
- Al Webster – drums

== Additional musicians ==
- Randy Bachman – guitar on track 6
- Unknown female backing vocals on track 10
