= Alex Pangman =

Canadian singer (born 1976)

Alex Pangman (born September 4, 1976) is a Canadian jazz singer and is a specialist in songs from the Great American Songbook.

In 2011 she signed with Justin Time Records for whom she recorded the album 33. With a JUNO awards nomination in 2016, videos, film, television, and radio appearances to her credit, she sings in a style made popular by jazz vocalists Connie Boswell and Kay Starr. She has collaborated and recorded with Bucky Pizzarelli, Ron Sexsmith, Dick Sudhalter, Don Kerr, Jeff Healey, Terra Hazelton, and members of the New Orleans Cottonmouth Kings. More recently she released an EP of material recorded directly onto 78 rpm acetate discs, as well as a single of a previously un-discovered song by Connie Boswell. She is also the radio host of Swing Set on Toronto's JAZZFM.91

Pangman inherited Cystic fibrosis. She had a successful double lung transplant in November 2008. After the surgery, she began to draw attention to the subject of organ and tissue donation in Canada. In the summer of 2013 while experiencing organ rejection, Pangman opened for Willie Nelson at Massey Hall in Toronto shortly before receiving her second double lung transplant in August 2013. By March 2014 she was recording music again. Pangman has also appeared on TVOntario's The Agenda with Steve Paikin to talk about her career in swing, as well as organ donation. She is married to "Colonel" Tom Parker, with whom she sings country music.

== Discography ==
- They Say... (Sensation, 1999)
- Can't Stop Me from Dreaming (Sensation, 2001)
- 33 (Justin Time, 2011)
- Have a Little Fun (Justin Time, 2013)
- New (Justin Time, 2014)
- Hot Three! (Justin Time, 2015)
