= Get Me Some (album) =

Studio album by the Jeff Healey Band
- Released: 2000
- Recorded: Forte Records
- Venue: 1999-2000
- Genre: Blues rock
- Length: 53:52
- Label: Eagle
- Producer: Marti Frederiksen: Arnold Lanni; Jim Scott; Richard Chycki; the Jeff Healey Band

The Jeff Healey Band chronology
Cover to Cover (1995)	Get Me Some (2000)	Among Friends (2002)

Professional ratings
Review scores
Source	Rating
AllMusic	3.5/5 stars
The Encyclopedia of Popular Music	4/5 stars
Goldmine	3/5 stars

Get Me Some is the fifth and final album by the Jeff Healey Band, released in 2000. It was their first album in five years and their first to contain original material since Feel This in 1992.

== Track listing ==
No.	Title	Writer(s)	Length
1.	"Which One"	Marti Frederiksen, Jeff Healey	3:54
2.	"Hey Hey"	Healey, Arnold Lanni	4:34
3.	"My Life Story"	Healey, Lanni, Stevie Salas	3:24
4.	"I Tried"	Diane Warren	4:05
5.	"I Should Have Told You"	Frederiksen, Healey	3:39
6.	"Love Is the Answer"	Frederiksen, Healey	4:22
7.	"The Damage Is Done"	Frederiksen, Healey	3:43
8.	"Feel Better"	Healey, Lanni	5:25
9.	"Holding On"	Frederiksen, Healey	4:22
10.	"Macon Georgia Blue"	Johnny Douglas, Dean Miller	4:23
11.	"House Is Burning Down"	Mark Holmes	4:22
12.	"Runaway Heart"	Marc Jordan, Anthony Vanderburgh	4:14
13.	"Rachel's Song"	Healey	3:25

== Personnel ==
The Jeff Healey Band

- Jeff Healey – vocals, electric guitars, acoustic guitars, backing vocals (2, 4, 6, 8, 9, 11), percussion (4, 11), acoustic piano (10)
- Joe Rockman – bass guitar
- Tom Stephen – drums, percussion (2)

Additional musicians

- Lou Pomanti – keyboards (3, 4, 6, 8, 9), acoustic piano (5)
- Ray Parker – keyboards (5)
- Benmont Tench – keyboards (10, 11)
- Richard Chycki – rhythm guitar (1, 5), percussion (1, 2, 5)
- Marti Frederiksen – guitars (1), backing vocals (1, 3, 5, 6, 9), keyboards (3), percussion (3, 6, 9), 12-string guitar (9)
- Arnold Lanni – guitars (2)
- Philip Sayce – guitars (2, 7)
- Sonia Jun – violin (5, 9)

Production

- Tom Stephen – executive producer
- The Jeff Healey Band – producers
- Marti Frederiksen – producer (1, 3, 5, 6, 8, 9), digital editing (1, 3, 5, 6, 8)
- Arnold Lanni – producer (2, 4, 7, 13)
- Jim Scott – producer (10–12), engineer (10–12), mixing (10–12)
- Richard Chycki – engineer (1–9, 13), mixing (1–9, 13), digital editing (1–9, 13), producer (2)
- Greg Calbi – mastering at Sterling Sound (New York, NY)
- Garnet Armstrong – art direction
- Ken Johnson – art direction
- Margaret Malandruccolo – photography
