= Feel This =

Studio album by the Jeff Healey Band
- Released: November 1992
- Recorded: June–August, 1992
- Studios: Forte and Sounds Interchange (Toronto, Ontario, Canada)
- Genre: Hard rock
- Length: 57:13
- Label: Arista
- Producers: Joe Hardy, the Jeff Healey Band

The Jeff Healey Band chronology
Hell to Pay (1990)	Feel This (1992)	Cover to Cover (1995)

Singles from Feel This
- 1. "Cruel Little Number" Released: November 1992; 2. "Heart of an Angel" Released: December 1992; 3. "Lost in Your Eyes" Released: March 1993; 4. "Leave a Light On" Released: June 1993; 5. "You're Coming Home" Released: September 1993

Feel This is the third album by the Jeff Healey Band, released in 1992.

== Critical reception ==
Professional ratings
Review scores
Source	Rating
AllMusic	4/5 stars
Calgary Herald	C−
Entertainment Weekly	D−

The Toronto Star noted that "the biggest drawback is the weak songwriting, including Tom Petty's contribution, 'Lost In Your Eyes'." The Gazette deemed the album Healey's "most professional set of lowest-common-denominator hard rock yet."

== Track listing ==
No.	Title	Writer(s)	Length
1.	"Cruel Little Number"	Jeff Healey, Joe Rockman, Tom Stephen, Carl Marsh, Justis Walkert	4:34
2.	"Leave the Light On"	Stan Lynch, Todd Sharp	4:20
3.	"Baby's Lookin' Hot"	Warren "Wiggy" Toll	4:11
4.	"Lost In Your Eyes"	Tom Petty	5:05
5.	"House That Love Built"	Tito Larriva, Tony Marsico, Valerie Marsico	4:49
6.	"Evil and Here to Stay"	Healey, Rockman, Stephen	4:28
7.	"My Kinda Lover"	Healey, Rockman, Stephen	4:58
8.	"It Could All Get Blown Away"	Barry Goldberg, Gerry Goffin, Ellen Goffin	4:41
9.	"You're Coming Home"	Healey, Rockman, Stephen, Stevie Salas	4:28
10.	"If You Can't Feel Anything Else"	Healey, Rockman, Stephen, Will Jennings, Jr. John	4:58
11.	"Heart of an Angel"	Mark Holmes	4:50
12.	"Live and Love (Not on The U.S. Album)"	Healey, Rockman, Stephen, Jennings	4:45
13.	"Joined at the Heart (Not on The U.S. Album)"	Healey, Rockman, Stephen, Jennings, Tobias	5:58
14.	"Dreams of Love"	Healey, Rockman, Stephen	5:31
Total length:			57:13

== Personnel ==
The Jeff Healey Band

- Jeff Healey – lead vocals, guitars
- Joe Rockman – bass guitar, backing vocals (3)
- Tom Stephen – drums, backing vocals (3)

Additional musicians

- Paul Shaffer – keyboards (1, 3, 4, 7, 9, 11–14)
- Washington Savage – keyboards (2, 5–7, 10)
- Joe Hardy – additional keyboards, additional percussion
- Richard Chycki – dobro (8)
- Mischke Butler – backing vocals (1, 2, 4, 8–10, 12, 14)
- Molly Johnson – backing vocals (2, 4, 10, 12)
- Jimi Jamison – backing vocals (3, 4, 7–9, 11–13)
- Amanda Marshall – backing vocals (3, 7–9, 11, 13)
- Warren "Wiggy" Toll – backing vocals (3)
- Jr. John – rap (10)

Handclaps on "My Kinda Lover"

- Richard Chycki, Sharron Robert, Warren "Wiggy" Toll, Patricia Worrall and Dawn Zeeman

Production

- The Jeff Healey Band – producers
- Joe Hardy – producer, engineer, mixing
- Richard Chycki – assistant engineer
- Brett Zilahi – assistant engineer
- David "Doomsday" Stinson – mix assistant
- George Marino – mastering at Sterling Sound (New York City, New York, USA)
- Tom Stephen – art direction, design
- Hugh Syme – art direction, design
- Jeff Katz – photography

== Charts ==
=== Album ===
Year	Chart	Peak position
1992	US Billboard 200	174
1992	Canadian RPM 100 Albums	27
1992	UK Albums Chart	72
1993	Australian ARIA Albums Chart	37
1992	Swedish Albums Chart	41
1992	Dutch Mega Album Top 100	57
1990	German Albums Charts	83

=== Singles ===
Year	Song	Chart	Peak Position
1992	"Cruel Little Number"	Canadian RPM 100 Hit Tracks	17
1993	"Heart of an Angel"	Canadian RPM 100 Hit Tracks	52
1993	"Lost in Your Eyes"	US Billboard Hot 100	91
1993	"Lost in Your Eyes"	Canadian RPM 100 Hit Tracks	5
1993	"Leave a Light On"	Canadian RPM 100 Hit Tracks	60
1994	"You're Coming Home"	Canadian RPM 100 Hit Tracks	40

== Certifications ==
Country	Certification	Sales
Canada (Music Canada)	Platinum	100,000+
