= Staker =

Staker is a surname. Notable people with the surname include:

- Brent Staker (born 1984), Australian rules footballer
- Robert Jackson Staker (1925–2008), jurist
- Steve Staker (1943–2020), American football coach

== See also ==
- Staker Wallace (born 1733), member of the Society of the United Irishmen
- Stake (disambiguation)
