= Steak (disambiguation) =

A steak is a cut of meat, by default beef, sliced perpendicular to the grain, and some other foods.

Steak may also refer to:

- Steak (film), a 2007 film by Quentin Dupieux
  - Steak (album), the soundtrack album to the film
- Mr. Steak, a restaurant chain
- "Steak" (Maalaala Mo Kaya), a 2019 episode about Bong Go

== See also ==
- Stake (disambiguation)
- Beefsteak (disambiguation)
