= Jeff Healey =

Canadian singer, guitarist and songwriter (1966–2008)

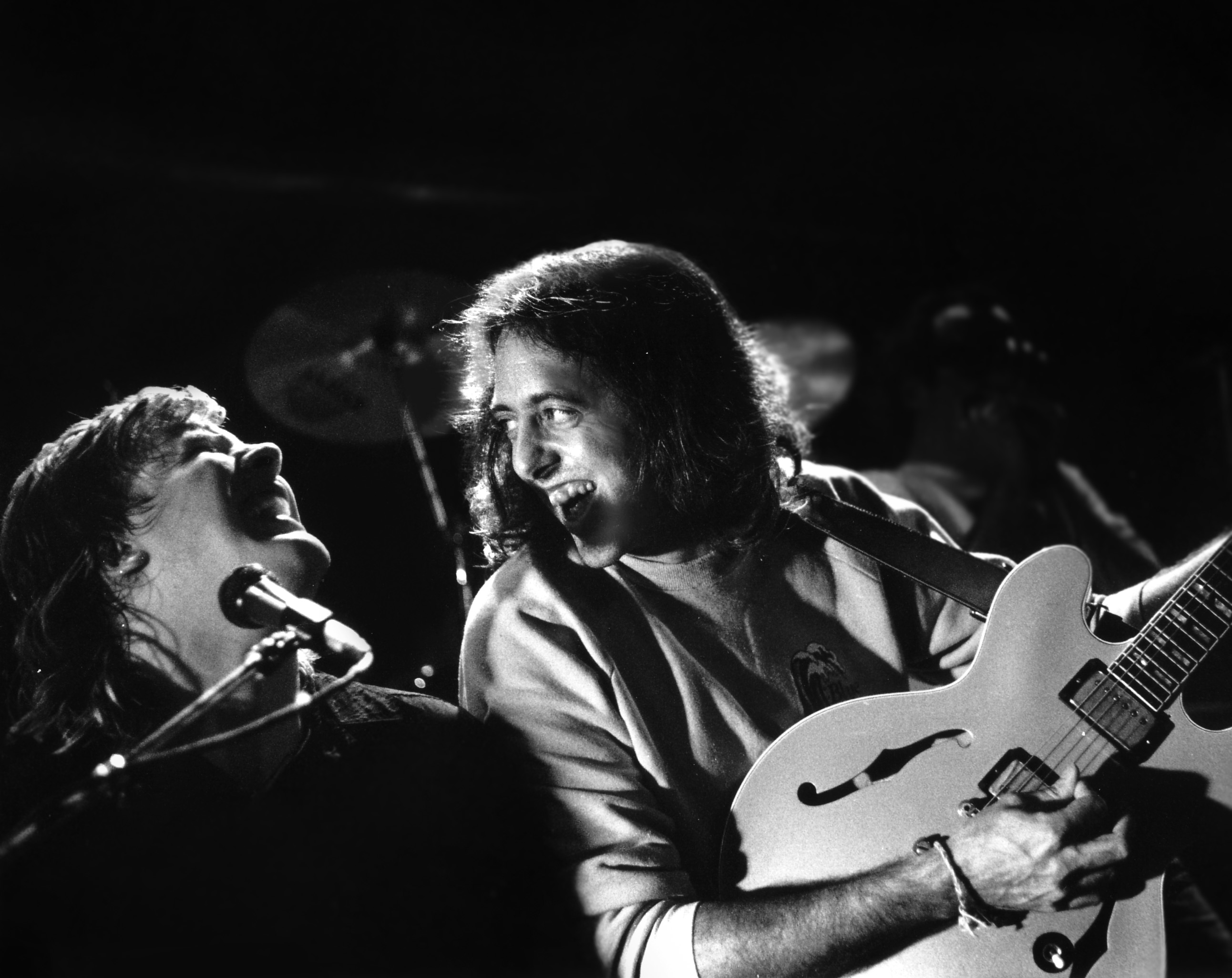
- Healey & Tom Lavin (Powder Blues Band)

Background information
- Born: Norman Jeffrey Healey; March 25, 1966; Toronto, Ontario, Canada
- Died: March 2, 2008 (aged 41) Toronto, Ontario, Canada
- Genres: Blues; rock; jazz
- Occupations: Musician; singer; songwriter; actor
- Instruments: Guitar; vocals
- Years active: 1981–2008
- Labels: Arista, BMG, Sony, Eagle, Sensation, Healey-O-Phonic, Stony Plain, Convexe Entertainment, Provogue, CBC, Arbor
- Spouse(s): Krista Miller (m. 1992, div. 1998); Cristie Hall (m. 2004)
- Website: jeffhealey.com

Norman Jeffrey Healey (March 25, 1966 – March 2, 2008) was a Canadian blues, rock and jazz guitarist, singer and songwriter who attained popularity in the 1980s and 1990s. He reached No. 5 on the U.S. Billboard Hot 100 chart with "Angel Eyes" and reached the Top 10 in Canada with the songs "I Think I Love You Too Much" and "How Long Can a Man Be Strong".

== Early life ==
Born in Toronto, Ontario, Healey was raised in the city's west end. He was adopted as an infant; his adoptive father was a firefighter. When he was almost one year old, Healey lost his sight due to retinoblastoma, a rare cancer of the eyes. His eyes had to be surgically removed, and he was given ocular prostheses.

== Early career and success ==
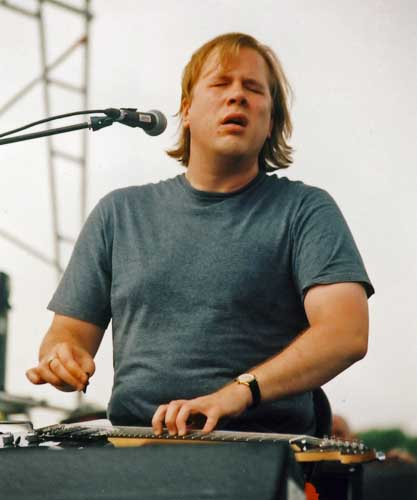
Healey performing on August 31, 2002

Healey began playing guitar when he was three, developing his unique style of playing the instrument flat on his lap. At nine years old, his musical talents were showcased in an interview on the TVOntario children's programme Cucumber. When he was 15, Healey formed the band Blue Direction, a four-piece that primarily played bar-band cover tunes and featured bassist Jeremy Littler, drummer Graydon Chapman, and schoolmate Rob Quail on second guitar. The band played at clubs in Toronto, including the Colonial Tavern.

Healey began hosting a jazz and blues show on radio station CIUT-FM, where he was known for playing from his massive collection of vintage 78 rpm gramophone records.

Shortly thereafter he was introduced to bassist Joe Rockman (born January 1, 1957, Toronto) and drummer Tom Stephen (born February 2, 1955, New Brunswick – died February 20, 2023), with whom he formed a trio, the Jeff Healey Band. The band made their first public appearance at the Birds Nest, located upstairs at Chicago's Diner on Queen Street West in Toronto. They received a write-up in Toronto's NOW magazine, and soon were playing almost nightly in local clubs, such as Grossman's Tavern and the famed blues club Albert's Hall (where Jeff Healey was discovered by guitarists Stevie Ray Vaughan and Albert Collins).

After being signed to Arista Records in 1988, the band released the album See the Light, which appeared on the RPM Top 100 chart in 1989. It featured the hit single "Angel Eyes" and the song "Hideaway", which was nominated for a Grammy Award for Best Rock Instrumental Performance. While the band was recording See the Light, they were also filming (and recording for the soundtrack of) the Patrick Swayze film Road House. Healey had numerous acting scenes in the movie with Swayze, as his band was the house cover band for the bar featured in the movie.

In 1990, the band won the Juno Award for Canadian Entertainer of the Year. The albums Hell to Pay and Feel This gave Healey 10 charting singles in Canada between 1990 and 1994, including a cover of the Beatles' "While My Guitar Gently Weeps", which featured George Harrison and Jeff Lynne on backing vocals and acoustic guitar. The Jeff Healey Band won World's Best-Selling Canadian Artist in 1990 and Best-Selling Canadian Group in 1991 at the World Music Awards.

== Later work and life ==
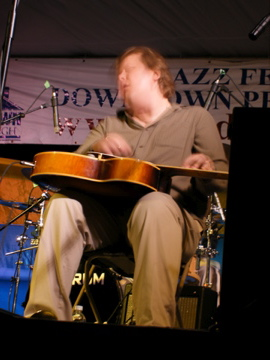
Jeff Healey live in 2007 with the Jazz Wizards

By the release of the 2000 album Get Me Some, Healey began to concentrate on jazz.

He went on to release three CDs of music of traditional American jazz from the 1920s and 1930s. He had been sitting in with these types of bands around Toronto since the beginning of his music career. Though known primarily as a guitarist, Healey also played trumpet during live performances. His main jazz group for touring and recording was Jeff Healey's Jazz Wizards.

Healey was an avid record collector and amassed a collection of well over 30,000 78 rpm records. Starting in 1990 he hosted a radio program of very early jazz on CIUT at the University of Toronto with Colin Bray. Later he went national on CBC Radio's program entitled My Kind of Jazz, in which he played records from his vast vintage jazz collection. He moved the show two years later to Jazz FM – CJRT; as a part of ongoing celebrations for what would have been Healey's 50th birthday in 2016, the latter program began to air in repeats Wednesdays 9pm on jazz.fm.

For many years, Healey toured throughout North America and Europe and performed at his club, "Healey's" on Bathurst Street in Toronto, where he played with his blues band on Thursday nights and also with his jazz group on Saturday afternoons. The club moved to a larger location at 56 Blue Jays Way and was rechristened "Jeff Healey's Roadhouse." Though he had lent his name to the club and often played there, Jeff Healey did not own or manage the bar. (The name came from the 1989 film, Road House, in which Healey appeared.) At the time of his death, he had been planning to perform a series of shows in the United Kingdom, Germany, and the Netherlands, with his other band, the Jeff Healey Blues Band (aka the "Healey's House Band") in April 2008.

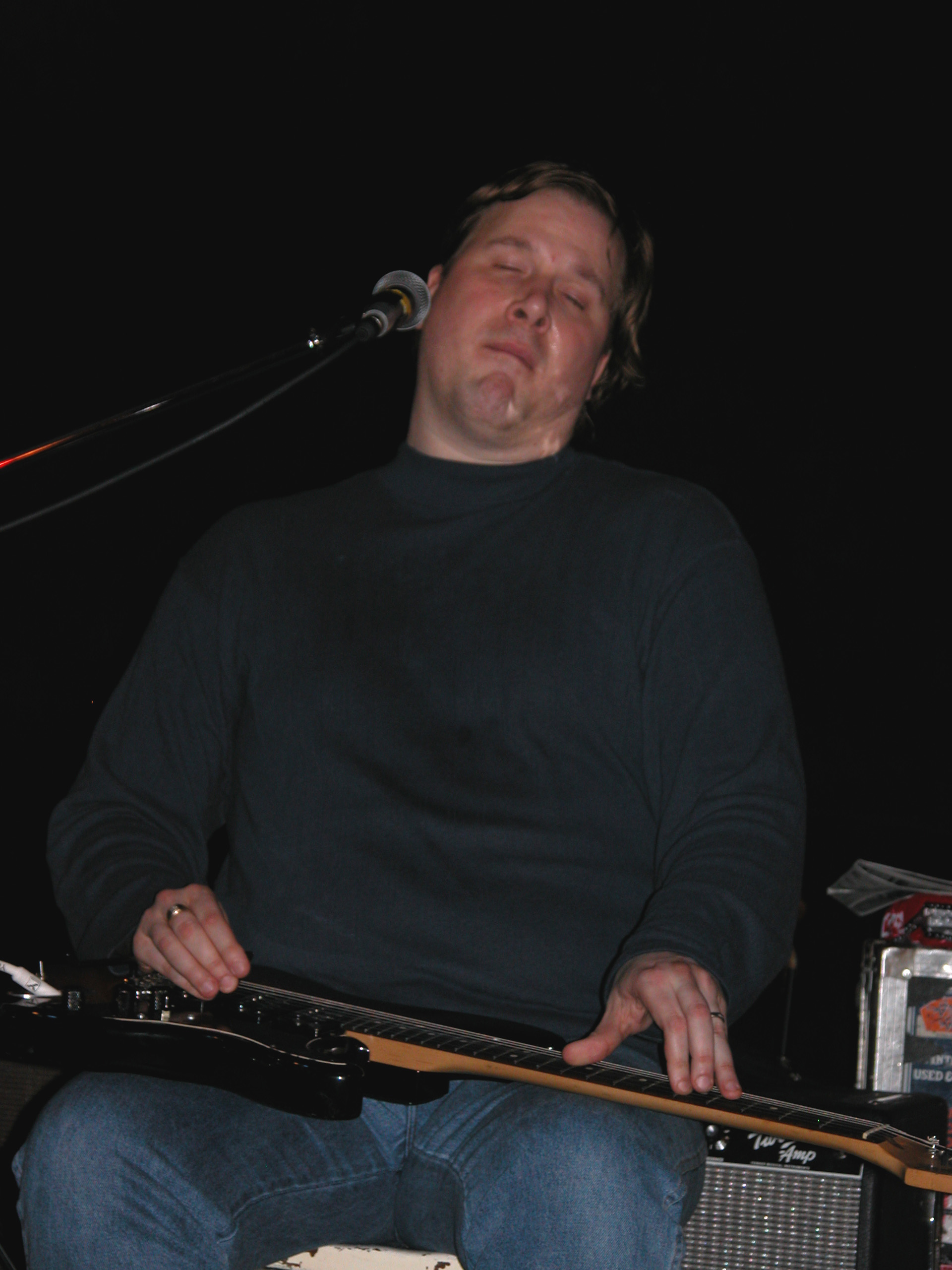
Healey performing in 2006 at his club, "Healey's"

Over the years, Healey toured and sat in with many well-known performers, including The Allman Brothers, Bonnie Raitt, Stevie Ray Vaughan, Buddy Guy, B. B. King, ZZ Top, Steve Lukather, Eric Clapton and many more. In 2006, Healey appeared on Deep Purple vocalist Ian Gillan's CD/DVD Gillan's Inn.

Healey discovered and helped develop the careers of other musical artists, including Alex Pangman, Terra Hazelton, Amanda Marshall, Shannon Curfman, and Philip Sayce

In early 2009, Healey's album Mess of Blues won in The 8th Annual Independent Music Awards for Best Blues Album.

In 2009, Healey was inducted into the Terry Fox Hall of Fame.

In June 2011, Woodford Park in Toronto was renamed Jeff Healey Park in his honour.

In 2014, Healey was inducted into Canada's Walk of Fame. In September 2016, Jeff Healey was inducted into the Mississauga Music Walk of Fame. In March 2016 the posthumous album Heal My Soul was released, followed by the companion album Holding On in December of the same year. Both records were compiled by Roger Costa from unreleased recordings. The 12 track Heal My Soul featured six covers and a number of collaborations with Marti Frederiksen, Arnold Lanni and Stevie Salas. The 15 track Holding On album contains ten live tracks recorded in 1999 at the Rockefeller Music Hall in Norway and five studio tracks.

== Personal life ==
Healey married Krista Miller in 1992; they had a daughter (Rachel) and were divorced in 1998. He married Cristie Hall in 2004 and had a son (Derek) with her.

== Illness and death ==
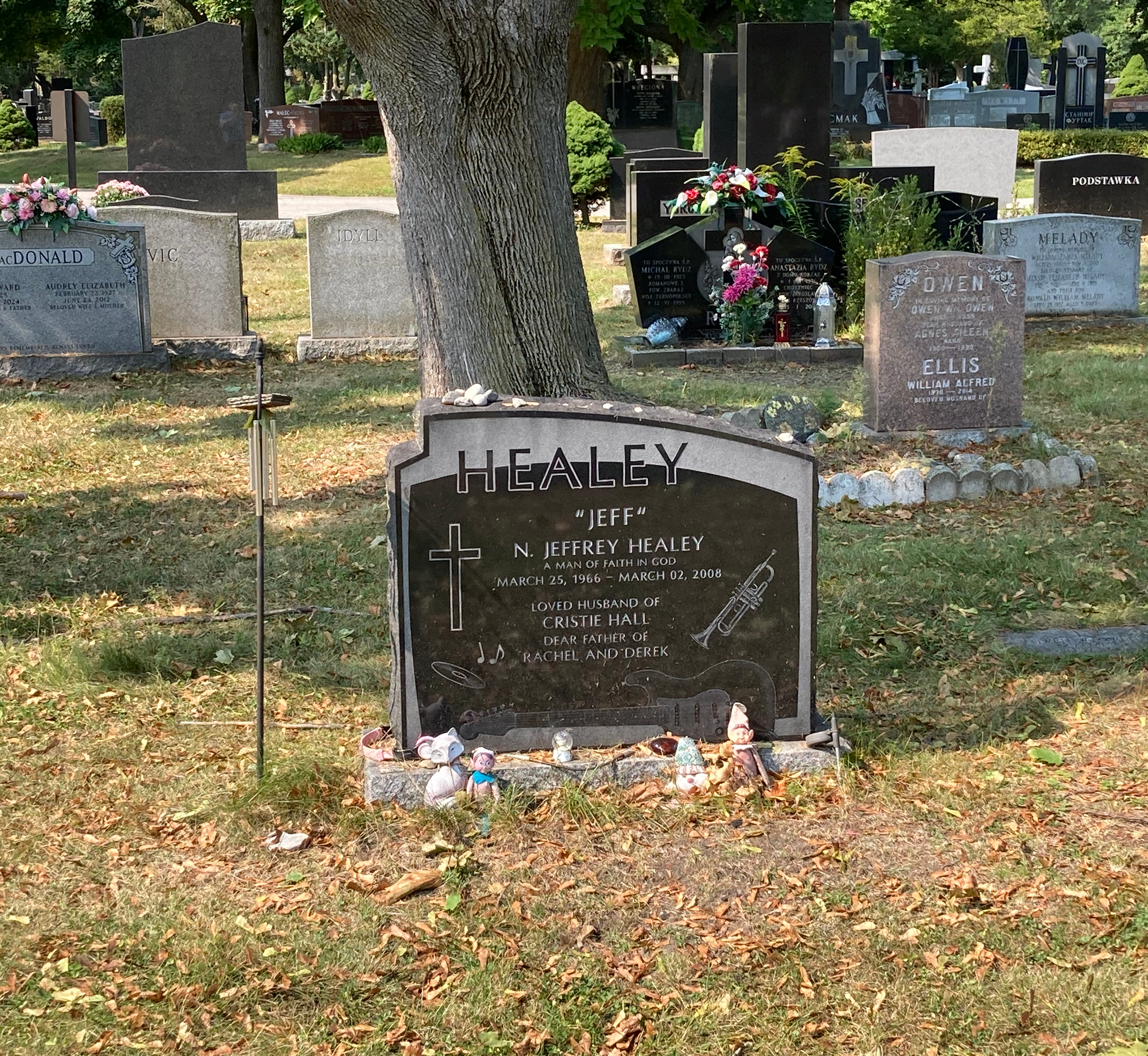
Healey's grave at Park Lawn Cemetery

On January 11, 2007, Healey underwent surgery to remove metastatic cancer tissue from both lungs. In the previous 18 months, he had two sarcomas removed from his legs. On March 2, 2008, Healey died of sarcoma in his home town of Toronto at the age of 41. He was buried at Park Lawn Cemetery, in Etobicoke, Ontario. Healey's death came a month before the release of Mess of Blues, which was his first rock/blues album in eight years.

== Discography ==
=== Jeff Healey Band ===
Year	Album	Label and Catalog Number	CAN	AUS	GER	UK	US	Certification
1988	See the Light	Arista ARCD-8553	25	33	33	58	22	CAN: 3× Platinum; ARIA: Gold; BPI: Silver; RIAA: Platinum
1990	Hell to Pay	Arista ARCD-8632	5	20	17	18	27	CAN: 2× Platinum; BPI: Silver; RIAA: Gold
1992	Feel This	Arista 07822-18706-2	27	37	83	72	174	CAN: Platinum
1995	Cover to Cover	Arista 07822-18770-2	44	80	–	50	–	CAN: Gold
2000	Get Me Some	Eagle ER-202042	–	–	54	135	–	
2024	Road House: The Lost Soundtrack	Arista 19658-80033-1	–	–	–	–	–	

=== Jeff Healey solo and with the Jazz Wizards ===
Year	Album	Label and Catalog Number	US	UK
2002	Among Friends	Stony Plain B000I2KPO6	–	–
2004	Adventures in Jazzland	Stony Plain B000I2KPOG	–	–
2006	It's Tight Like That	Stony Plain B000ETRIZ2	–	–
2008	Mess of Blues	Stony Plain B0016MX3F0	–	182
2009	Songs From The Road	Stony Plain B002F040F4	–	–
2010	Last Call	Stony Plain B0036WL32S	–	–

=== Jeff Healey solo ===
- 2002: Among Friends (Sensation; Stony Plain)
- 2003: Live at Healey's (Bolder)
- 2004: Adventures in Jazzland (HealeyOphonic; Stony Plain)
- 2006: It's Tight Like That (Stony Plain)
- 2008: Mess of Blues (Ruf; Stony Plain)
- 2009: Songs From The Road (Ruf; Stony Plain)
- 2010: Last Call (Stony Plain)
- 2016: Heal My Soul (Convexe Entertainment; Provogue)
- 2016: Holding On: A 'Heal My Soul' Companion (Convexe Entertainment; Provogue)
- 2020: Heal My Soul: Deluxe Edition (Eagle Rock Entertainment)

=== Live albums ===
- 1993: Live in Belgium (CD & DVD) (Eagle Vision)
- 2003: Live at Healey's (Bolder)
- 2005: Live at Montreux 1999 (Eagle)
- 2011: Live at Grossman's 1994 (Eagle Rock North/Convexe)
- 2013: As The Years Go Passing By: Live in Germany 1989-1995-2000 (in-akustik) – note: the first release of archival material compiled with the participation and full approval of the Jeff Healey Estate.
- 2013: Live From NYC (Eagle Rock)
- 2014: Live at the Legendary Horseshoe Tavern, 1993 (Eagle Rock)

=== Compilations ===
- 1998: The Very Best of Jeff Healey (RCA)
- 1998: The Very Best of Jeff Healey (MSI Music Distribution)
- 1999: Master Hits (Arista)
- 2004: The Platinum and Gold Collection (Arista)
- 2008: Super Hits (Sony BMG)
- 2008: Legacy: Volume One (Ear Music; Arbor Records Ltd)
- 2013: Playlist: The Very Best of the Jeff Healey Band (Arista)
- 2013: House on Fire – Demos & Rarities (Eagle Rock North)
- 2015: The Best of the Stony Plain Years (Stony Plain)

=== Appearances on other albums ===
- 1988 The Promise by Matt Minglewood (Savannah Music/WEA)
- 1995 Let It Rock! (The Rock 'n' Roll Album of the Decade) (Quality Records) – Ronnie Hawkins' 60th Birthday Bash, Live at Massey Hall, featuring The Band, Jerry Lee Lewis, Carl Perkins, Larry Gowan.
- 1999 Blues Blues Blues by Jimmy Rogers All-Stars (Atlantic Records)
- 2003 Live at Last by Matt Minglewood Band feat. Jeff Healey (Norton Records)
- 2004 What's Love? A Tribute to Tina Turner (Versailles Records)
- 2006 Full Circle by Walter Trout (Ruf Records)

=== Compilation inclusions ===
- 1997 Hits of the 80s
- 2002 While My Guitar Gently Weeps
- 2006 Saturday Night Blues: 20 Years (CBC)

=== Singles ===
Year	Single	Peak chart positions					Album
Year	Single	CAN	AUS	UK	US	US Rock	Album
1986	"Adrianna / See the Light"	—	—	—	—	—	single only
1988	"Confidence Man"	36	84	76	—	11	See the Light
1989	"Angel Eyes"	16	115	86	5	24	See the Light
1989	"See the Light"	—	—	—	—	33	See the Light
1989	"Raising Heaven / Hoochie Coochie Man" (by Patrick Swayze / The Jeff Healey Band)	—	—	—	—	29	Road House Soundtrack
1989	"When the Night Comes Falling From the Sky"	—	—	99	—	—	Road House Soundtrack
1989	"Roadhouse"	—	146	—	—	—	Road House Soundtrack
1990	"I Think I Love You Too Much"	5	—	98	—	5	Hell to Pay
1990	"While My Guitar Gently Weeps"	27	127	85	—	7	Hell to Pay
1990	"Full Circle"	72	—	—	—	16	Hell to Pay
1991	"How Long Can a Man Be Strong"	8	—	—	—	34	Hell to Pay
1991	"How Much"	32	—	—	—	—	Hell to Pay
1992	"Cruel Little Number"	17	141	79	—	2	Feel This
1993	"Heart of an Angel"	52	—	—	—	20	Feel This
1993	"Lost in Your Eyes"	5	—	—	91	—	Feel This
1993	"Leave the Light On"	60	—	—	—	—	Feel This
1994	"You're Coming Home"	40	—	—	—	—	Feel This
1995	"I Got a Line on You"	34	—	—	—	—	Cover To Cover
1995	"Angel"	33	—	—	—	—	Cover To Cover
1995	"Stuck in the Middle with You"	33	96	79	—	39	Cover To Cover
2000	"My Life Story"	—	—	—	—	—	Get Me Some
2000	"I Tried"	—	—	—	—	—	Get Me Some
"—" denotes single that did not chart or was not released.

== Filmography ==
- 1989: Road House as Cody
- 1999: Live at Montreux
- 2004: See The Light (BMG)
- 2013: As The Years Go Passing By: Live in Germany 1989-1995-2000 (in-akustik)

== See also ==
- Canadian blues
- Canadian rock
- Music of Canada
