= Beef Creek =

Stream in South Dakota, U.S.

- Location within South Dakota

Location
- Country: United States
- State: South Dakota

Physical characteristics
- Source
  - location: South Dakota
  - coordinates: 43°06′23″N 103°14′47″W
- Mouth
  - location: South Dakota

Basin features
- GNIS ID: 1266773

Beef Creek is a stream in the U.S. state of South Dakota. Beef Creek was named for the fact ranchers would allow their cattle to graze there.

== See also ==
- List of rivers of South Dakota
