= Mess of Blues (Jeff Healey album) =

Studio album by Jeff Healey
- Released: March 11, 2008
- Recorded: 2007
- Studios: Studio 92, Islington Academy, Jeff Healey's Roadhouse
- Genre: Blues rock
- Length: 51:18
- Label: Ruffhouse
- Producer: Alec Fraser

Jeff Healey chronology
It's Tight Like That (2006)	Mess of Blues (2008)	Songs from the Road (2009)

Mess of Blues is an album by Jeff Healey. It was released in March 2008, less than two weeks after Healey's death. Four of the album's tracks were recorded live in front of audiences, two of the live tracks at the Islington Academy in London, and the other two live tracks at Jeff Healey's Roadhouse in Toronto. The other six tracks were recorded at Studio 92 in Canada by Norm Barker and Richard Uglow. The whole album features the band which normally accompanied Jeff at his club, Jeff Healey's Roadhouse. The song "Mess of Blues", which appears on the album was written by Doc Pomus and Mort Shuman and was originally recorded by Elvis Presley.

== Track listing ==
1. "I'm Tore Down" – 5:23
2. "How Blue Can You Get" – 8:54
3. "Sugar Sweet" (Mel London) – 3:46
4. "Jambalaya (On the Bayou)" – 4:00
5. "The Weight" – 4:26
6. "Mess O' Blues" – 3:24
7. "It's Only Money" (Dave Murphy) – 3:10
8. "Like a Hurricane" – 6:39
9. "Sitting on Top of the World" – 7:07
10. "Shake, Rattle and Roll" – 4:29

== Personnel ==
- Jeff Healey – vocals, guitars
- Dave Murphy – keyboards, vocals (7)
- Alec Fraser – acoustic guitar, bass guitar, vocals (4)
- Dan Noordermeer – guitars, vocals
- Al Webster – drums
- Holger Peterson – backing vocals

=== Production ===
- Holger Peterson – executive producer, liner notes
- Jeff Healey – producer, liner notes
- Alec Fraser – producer, mixing
- Jim Hurst – live track recording
- Tom Jardin – live track recording
- Andrew Tulloch – live track recording
- Norm Barker – studio track recording
- Richard Uglow – studio track recording
- Debbie Murphy – front house sound
- Andy Krem – mastering at Silverbirch Productions (Toronto, Ontario, Canada)
- Mark Dutton – graphic design
- Michael Van Merwyk – artwork
- Chris "Copper" Topp – photography
