= Leaf (Dutch band) =

Dutch pop band

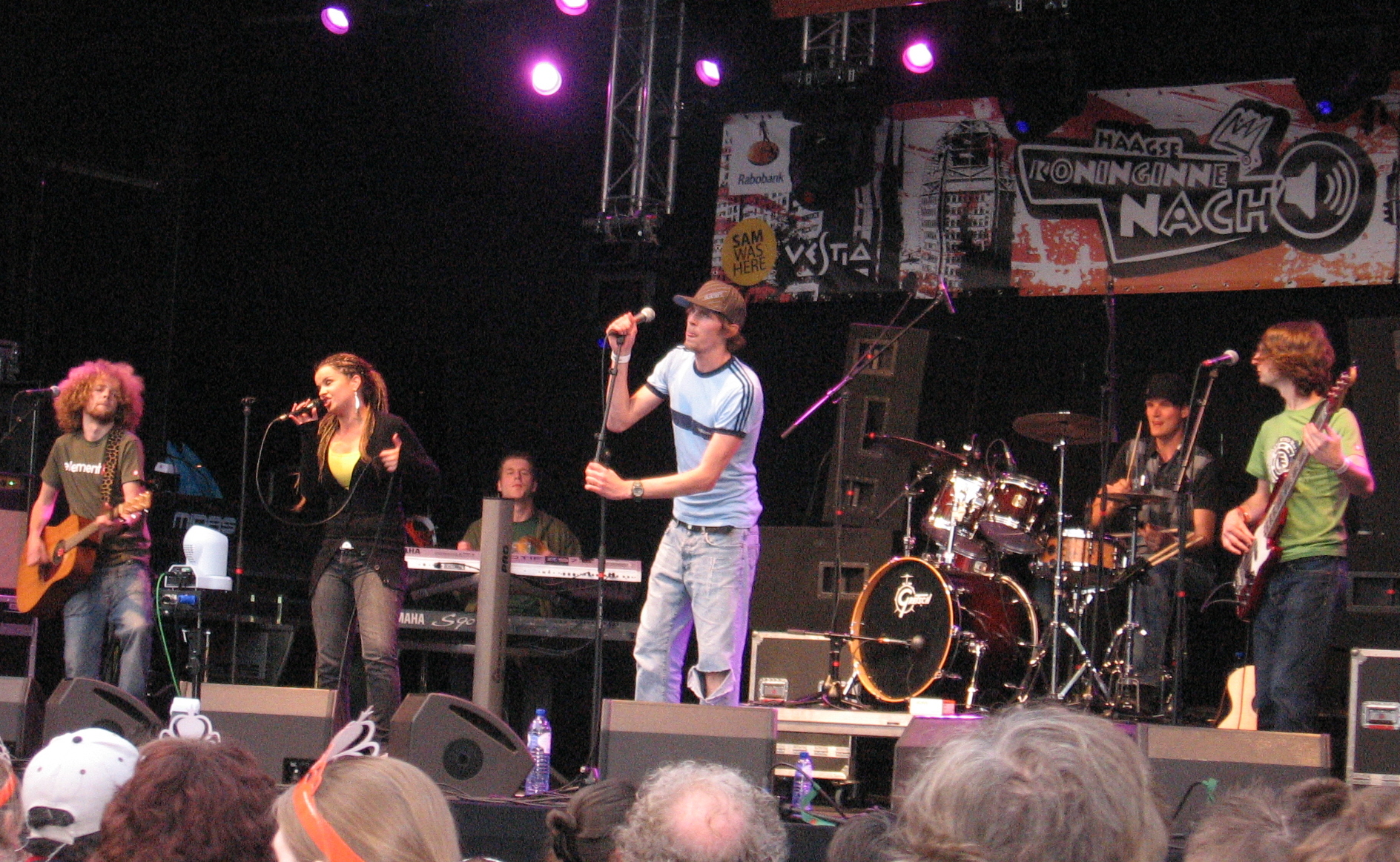
- Leaf, 2008.

Background information
- Origin: Utrecht, Netherlands
- Genres: Pop
- Years active: 2005 – 2009
- Labels: 8ball Music
- Members: Annemarie Brohm; Tinus Konijnenburg; Ocker Gevaerts; Joni Scholten; Jeroen Blumers; Stan Coppers

Leaf was a Dutch band from Utrecht. Their first single, Wonderwoman was released in October 2007.

== History ==
Leaf was founded in 2005 by a group of students from the Rockacademie. The band played acoustic pop songs and had quite a bit of success at the Dutch Popronde 2006. In the spring of 2007 they came out on top in a talent contest held by the Dutch newspaper De Telegraaf. The band members were Annemarie Brohm, Tinus Konijnenburg, Ocker Gevaerts, Joni Scholten and Jeroen Blumers.

The band's independently produced album 'Life's a Beach' was received very well, and was later re-released on 16 November 2007 after securing a record label. One of the most popular singles on the album is Wonderwoman (a.k.a. "Why's my Life so Boring"), which went on to become a top 10 hit in the Dutch Top 40 charts. The song got an additional popularity boost due to it being used in the television show Koefnoen.

The band split up on 12 January 2009 due to creative differences within the group.

== Discography ==
=== Albums ===
- 2007: Life's a Beach

=== Singles ===
Year	Single	Album	Peak Position	
Year	Single	Album	Dutch Top 40	Dutch Top 100
2007	"Wonderwoman"	Life's a Beach	4	4
2008	"New Song"	Life's a Beach	26	24
2008	"Motherfucker"	Life's a Beach	-	75
