= Staking =

Staking may refer to:

- Staking (manufacturing), a process for connecting two components
- Poker staking, the act of one person putting up cash for a poker player to play with in hopes that the player wins
- Construction staking, a form of land surveying in which wood and metal stakes are placed in the ground to establish points which guide the construction of buildings and infrastructure.
- Impalement, the torture or execution method where a stake or spear is driven through the body
- Staking (cryptocurrency), Proof of stake the Consent mechanism in newer cryptocurrency blockchains, such as Ethereum.
