= British Energy Efficiency Federation =

British trade association

The British Energy Efficiency Federation (BEEF) was founded in 1996 by the United Kingdom Government to provide a forum for consultation between existing industry associations in the energy sector.
