= Philip Sayce =

Canadian-American blues rock guitarist

- Born: Philip Sayce; Aberystwyth, Wales, United Kingdom
- Origin: Toronto, Canada
- Genres: Rock, blues rock, hard rock
- Instruments: Guitar, vocals
- Years active: 1990s–present
- Label: Warner Music
- Website: philipsayce.com

Philip Sayce is a Welsh-born Canadian-American guitarist, singer, songwriter, performer, and producer.

Philip Sayce began playing in Toronto clubs at the age of 16 and quickly became a regular fixture on Toronto's bar-scene. Sayce joined Jeff Healey's band in 1997 and toured with him for 3 1/2 years. Sayce later moved to Los Angeles to expand and landed a gig with Uncle Kracker, which whom he toured for 18 months and appeared on the album "No Stranger To Shame". In 2004, Sayce joined Melissa Etheridge and her band for her Lucky Tour. He appeared on a number of her albums and on stage with Etheridge at the 2007 Academy Awards. He also appeared at the 2005 Grammy Awards as part of a tribute to Janis Joplin and at the 2008 Democratic National Convention.

Sayce released his album Peace Machine in 2009 followed by Innerevolution in 2010. The same year, Sayce supported ZZ Top in Europe and Deep Purple in France. Sayce released the albums Ruby Electric in 2011 and Steamroller in 2012. He made his major label album debut in 2015 with the release of Influence, and scored a top 20 hit at rock radio in Canada with his rendition of "I'd Love To Change the World". Sayce toured in support of Influence in 2015, with performances at the Fuji Rock Festival, Montreal International Jazz Festival, and Ottawa Bluesfest. His live EP, Scorched Earth, was released in 2016 and was followed in 2020 by the album Spirit Rising, which became Sayce's most popular release to date.

== Early life ==
Sayce was born in Aberystwyth on June 3, 1976, his family moved to Canada when he was two years old, and he grew up in Toronto. His parents, Kenneth and Sheila, listened to music by Eric Clapton, Ry Cooder and Dire Straits, amongst others. His parents' love of music inspired his love for the guitar, and he also played the piano and trombone for over 10 years. He was fifteen years old when he played in his first band. Sayce and his best friend, drummer Cassius Pereira, played in bands together throughout high school, holding band practice in their basements. Sayce's style is influenced by Jimi Hendrix, and Stevie Ray Vaughan, whose death in August 1990 affected the young guitarist.

Sayce began playing in Toronto clubs at the age of 16. He quickly became a regular fixture on Toronto's bar-scene. Some of the clubs Sayce frequented were Grossman's Tavern, The Silver Dollar, Blues on Bellair, The Horseshoe Tavern, and Albert's Hall in Toronto, known for their jam sessions with artists such as Robbie Robertson, Stevie Ray Vaughan, Bob Dylan and Jeff Healey. His other musical influences include B.B. King, Albert King, Albert Collins, Buddy Guy, and Robert Cray. Sayce joined Jeff Healey's band in 1997 and toured the world for three and a half years, playing across North America, Europe, UK, Brazil, Finland and Scandinavia. A commercially released performance at the Montreux Jazz Festival in Switzerland is a snapshot of Philip's first European tour with Healey and his band.

== Career ==
Sayce quickly gained attention as a teenage guitarist through his regular gigs at Toronto clubs, and he gradually developed a solid fan base. Sayce moved to Los Angeles with his wife to expand his music career. He soon landed a gig with Uncle Kracker and toured with him for eighteen months. During this time the powerful cover of Dobie Gray's Drift Away set a Billboard record for most weeks at #1 on any chart, for a staggering 28 weeks in the United States. With Uncle Kracker, Philip appeared on the album "No Stranger To Shame", and on TV shows such as New Year's Rockin’ Eve, Regis and Kelly, The Tonight Show with Jay Leno, and The CBS Early Show.

Sayce also wrote the music for the 2002 short film, Cockroach Blue, which he also starred in. It was produced and directed by award-winning Robert Crossman. The film was shown at the 2003 Woodstock Film Festival.

In the autumn of 2003, Sayce met John Shanks in the amp department at Westwood Music in Los Angeles while trying out some amplifiers. Just a week before, Melissa Etheridge had mentioned to Shanks that she was looking for a guitar player and was thinking of trying somebody different. Shanks referred Sayce to her and in January 2004, Sayce joined Etheridge and her band for her Lucky Tour. Sayce appeared on Etheridge's Lucky CD and the Lucky Live CD & DVD, released in September 2004, Melissa Etheridge Greatest Hits: The Road Less Traveled released in 2005, The Awakening" released in 2007, and A New Thought For Christmas released in September 2008. He also performed on Etheridge's "I Need To Wake Up" from the Al Gore 2006 documentary film An Inconvenient Truth. Sayce appeared with Etheridge at the 2007 Academy Awards, Live Earth in 2007, The 2005 Grammy Awards as part of a tribute to Janis Joplin (along with Joss Stone), and at the 2008 Democratic National Convention in Denver, Colorado.

Sayce released his album Peace Machine, on Provogue Records in 2009. He released a second album Innerevolution in Europe, in May 2010. In July 2010, Sayce supported ZZ Top in Europe and in December 2010, he supported Deep Purple on their French dates. Sayce released the albums Ruby Electric (2011) and Steamroller (2012), produced by Dave Cobb, in Europe, and promoted these releases with multiple tours across Europe and the United Kingdom.

He performed at Eric Clapton's Crossroads Guitar Festival 2013 in New York City at Madison Square Garden, and was highlighted among the top performances of the festival by Premier Guitar.

Sayce signed with Warner Music Canada in 2015 after Warner VP Steve Waxman discovered Sayce's music while streaming tunes on Spotify. Sayce made his major label album debut on April 7, 2015, with the release of Influence, and scored a top 20 hit at rock radio in Canada with his rendition of Ten Years After's, "I'd Love To Change the World". Sayce toured in support of Influence in 2015, with performances at the Fuji Rock Festival, Montreal International Jazz Festival, and Ottawa Bluesfest.

Scorched Earth, a live EP recorded at The Silver Dollar Room in Toronto, Canada was released via Warner Music Canada in 2016.

Sayce released his album Spirit Rising in 2020 with Warner Music Canada during the COVID-19 pandemic, and it quickly became his most popular release to date receiving millions of streams of songs such as Burning Out, Spirit, and Black Roller Coming. The entire album is dedicated to Sayce's father, who is instrumental in Philip's love of music.

In August 2021, Sayce shared social media posts from the studio in Los Angeles where he is recording his follow-up to Spirit Rising.

== Discography ==
=== As leader ===
- Philip Sayce Group (1997) Hypnotic Records/MCA Records Canada; reissued on True North Records (Canada)
- Peace Machine (2005/2009) Provogue Records
- Silver Wheel of Stars EP (2007)
- Silver Wheel of Stars (2007)
- Innerevolution (2010) Provogue
- Ruby Electric (2011) Provogue
- Steamroller (2012) Provogue
- Influence (2014) Warner Music Canada
- Scorched Earth: Volume 1 [live at the Silver Dollar Room, Toronto, April 14, 2016] (2016) Warner Music Canada
- Woodstock (As seen on the album: Covered in Gold: 5.0, Side A) (2017) Warner Music Canada
- Spirit Rising (2020) Warner Music Canada
- The Wolves Are Coming(2024) Forty Below Records
- Hole In Your Soul (2024) Forty Below Records
- Peace Machine (Live in L.A. at The Baked Potato) (2025) Atomic Gemini
- Chevrolet (2025) Atomic Gemini

=== As sideman ===
- Jeff Healey Band Get Me Some (2000)
- Uncle Kracker No Stranger To Shame (2002)
- Melissa Etheridge Lucky Live CD & DVD (2004)
- Melissa Etheridge/Joss Stone "Cry Baby/Piece of My Heart" (2005) Grammy Awards Performance
- Melissa Etheridge The Road Less Traveled (2005)
- Jimmy Barnes Double Happiness (2005)
- Jeff Healey Band Live at Montreux (2005)
- Melissa Etheridge I Need To Wake Up (2006) Academy Award-winning song
- Gentlemen's Blues Club White Room - Feat. Philip Sayce - Sonic Assault Mix (2006)
- Melissa Etheridge The Awakening (2007)
- Melissa Etheridge The Awakening Live DVD (2008)
- Melissa Etheridge A New Thought For Christmas (2008)
- Lily Wilson The Right Time (2008)
- Fred Mandel Slipping (2024)
- Bernie Barlow Million Miles An Hour (2025)
- Bernie Barlow Stand In My Way (2025)
- NINJA TRACKS Come Together (2025)

== Equipment ==
Philip's favorite instrument is a white 1963 Fender Stratocaster named "Mother". He also owns another vintage Stratocaster in a sunburst finish as well as various other vintage instruments.

For amplifiers, Sayce has used a vintage Fender Super Reverb, which he called "my favourite amp", for much of his live work as well as some custom made amplifiers. The Diaz Texas Square Face and Diaz Texas Ranger, other effects include a TS808 tube screamer, univibe and a Clyde McCoy Wah. Philip has worked with Cesar Diaz, Tommy Cougar, and Alexander Dumble to help shape his sound and tone.
