= Kipp Lennon =

American musician (born 1960)

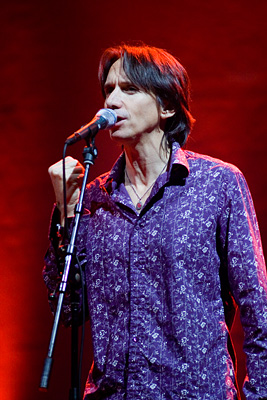
- Lennon performing in 2006

Background information
- Born: Christopher Joel Lennon; March 12, 1960 (age 66); Venice, California, U.S.
- Genre: Rock
- Occupations: Musician; songwriter; actor
- Instruments: Vocals; percussion
- Years active: 1977–present
- Member of: Venice
- Formerly of: Pine Mountain Logs; Ambrosia

Christopher Joel "Kipp" Lennon (born March 12, 1960) is an American musician, songwriter, and actor. Lennon is a founding member of the folk rock band Venice. His role in the band includes performing as a lead vocalist and percussionist. Lennon was also a member of the progressive rock band Ambrosia from 2021 to 2024.

== Early and personal life ==
Lennon was born in Venice, California, the youngest son of William and Isabelle Lennon with four additional sons and seven daughters. William Herbert Lennon and Isabelle Emily "Sis" Denning married in early 1939. He worked as a milkman for many years before getting a job at a local golf course. Isabelle was a housewife remaining at home to raise their twelve children.
His given name is Christopher. His explanation for his nickname is: "When I was brought home from the hospital as a brand new baby, everyone was calling me 'Chrissy', like people do with newborns. You add an 'e' or 'y' or whatever to their name as an instant nickname. Okay, so my brother Joe was three years old, and he couldn't say 'Chrissy', and kept saying 'Kippy'. My brother Dan, who was ten, thought that was hilarious, and from that day on, literally my first day at home, I was dubbed Kippy, never to be called Christopher again except by doctors, teachers, cops, and my mom if she was mad at me." Lennon is the youngest brother of the popular female quartet The Lennon Sisters, who rose to fame on The Lawrence Welk Show and continued a successful singing career in the subsequent decades. Isabelle Lennon's ancestry was a mixture of Mexican, Spanish, German, and Irish. Her maternal grandfather, Pablo Alvarez (1857–1905), was born in Santa Ana, California, and her maternal grandmother, Margarita Camacho (1864–1938), was from Wilmington, California. Pablo's great-great-great-grandfather, Bernardo Salgado De Oliberos, was born in San Andrés, Spain.

When Lennon was nine years old, he and his family endured the shooting death of their father, William. Chet Young, a stalker who believed himself to be married to Kipp's sister Peggy (of The Lennon Sisters), felt that their father stood in the way and had to be eliminated. Lying in wait, Young shot him in the parking lot of the Marina Del Rey golf course and two months later, used the same gun to commit suicide. The family later discovered an unopened letter having a cutout of Mr. Lennon, a picture of a gun pointed at his head, and the words "High Noon" (the time of the murder).

== Career ==
=== Music ===
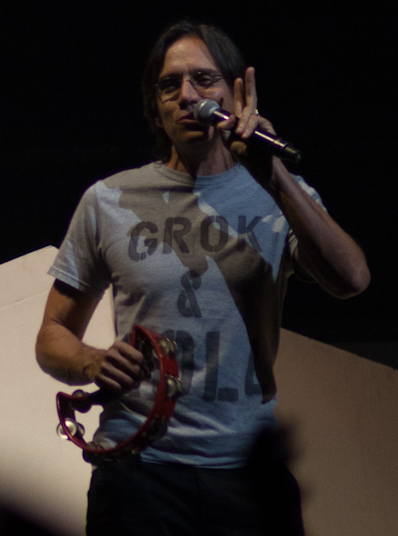
Lennon with Roger Waters in 2012

Venice was founded in 1977; the band was initially founded by Lennon and his cousin Michael Lennon. The following year Michael's brother Mark joined, with Kipp's brother Pat joining in 1980. Since that time, the two pairs of cousins have performed and released 13 albums and other works since 1986. Kipp plays percussion and writes songs for the band. He performed with the rest of the band on their live DVD, Venice, Live at the Royal Carre Theater. He also sings for the Pine Mountain Logs, a band containing many of the members of Venice and playing only cover versions of rock songs.

Additionally, Lennon released one solo album, Boom Boom Party (CBS/Sony), in 1987. Lennon sang with David Crosby on his solo album Thousand Roads, and also performed vocals for the song "Suspension," which was the main title of the 1979 theatrical pilot of Buck Rogers in the 25th Century.

In September 2010, Lennon joined Roger Waters' the Wall Live tour, singing backup vocals.

Lennon joined the classic progressive rock band Ambrosia on lead vocals in 2021 replacing Ken Stacey who exited in 2020. In late 2024, he returned to Venice and was replaced by former singer Shem Von Schroeck

=== Film ===
Although Lennon did not appear in the 1987 Disney movie Double Switch, he did perform the vocals for the songs used in the soundtrack, "Turn up the Radio", "All Day, All Night", and "One Step Closer".

Lennon also sang the theme songs to C.H.U.D. II: Bud the C.H.U.D. (1989) and the theatrical pilot of Buck Rogers in the 25th Century (1979).

Lennon sang "Secret Agent Man" in the movie Can't Buy Me Love.

He also sang for the actor John Scott Clough in the Sidney Poitier-directed dance/musical film Fast Forward.

=== Television roles ===
Lennon has contributed to several episodes of The Simpsons: in season 3's "Stark Raving Dad", although Michael Jackson (credited as "John Jay Smith") performed the speaking part of Leon Kompowsky, a character who pretended he was Michael Jackson, Lennon sang the songs due to Jackson's contractual obligations with his record company at the time. Most notably he sang the song "Happy Birthday Lisa", written by Jackson within the episode. He also provided older teenager/young adult Jackson's singing voice in The Jacksons: An American Dream. Lennon returned as Kompowsky to sing the extra verses Bart wrote for his sister in season 29's "Mr. Lisa's Opus".

Lennon also sang the songs "Flaming Moe's" (a spoof of the theme song from the TV series Cheers) in the episode of the same name, "The Sound of Grandpa" from "Lady Bouvier's Lover", and "Raindrops Keep Fallin' on My Head" from "Duffless". He sang the original song "I'm Checking In" featured in the Betty Ford musical in "The City of New York vs. Homer Simpson".

In addition to The Simpsons, Lennon voiced Michael Jackstone on The Flintstone Kids' Just Say No Special, and various roles in The Story of Santa Claus, The Fall Guy, Eight Is Enough, and the TV series of Herbie the Love Bug.
