= Beef (band) =

Dutch band

- Beef

Background information
- Origin: Eindhoven, Netherlands
- Genres: Reggae; Ska; Funk; Rock
- Years active: 1999–2012
- Labels: Drunken Maria; Partners in Crime; Play It Again Sam; Beef Foundation
- Members: Pieter Both; Bram Wouters; Bas van de Biggelaar; Twan van Gerven; Koen Lommerse; Jonas Filtenborg

Beef was a Dutch band. While generally classified as reggae, their music combined many different styles.

== History ==
Beef was formed out of an underground radio show called "The Chop Shop" in 1999. Their early recordings, released only on cassettes (the 1.1Gr.Fm Sessions), have become collector items. The same holds for the 10 inch EP release Babylon by Beef (Drunken Maria, 1999). After the first full studio album, entitled Flexodus (Partners in Crime, 1999), record company PIAS picked up on the buzz, signed the band and had them record their self-titled second album in England. Under productional leadership of singer Bitty McLean, "Beef!" was created. "Late Night Sessions", the first single from the album, became a big hit.

In 2002, the band was invited to the Nuit Tipique festival in Burkina Faso. Later, in 2005, they were voted "the most popular foreign band to attend the festival in the last 10 years" by the festival visitors. In the same year, the band also won the prestigious "Zilveren Harp" (Silver Harp) for their contribution to Dutch pop culture.

Michel Schoots (Urban Dance Squad) was responsible for the production of their third album Last Rudy Standing (PIAS, 2005). He took the band into the ICP studios in Brussels and on a different musical path. This resulted in an album with singles like "Cashing the Money" and "Last Rudy Standing". The latter was used by Amnesty International in their Control Arms campaign, in which the band took up the role as ambassador.

2007 started with the recording of a new studio album and a release of their live album Last Rudies Live – The Singles (the first release on their own label "Beef Foundation").

April 2008 saw the release of the album The Original, an album where they had a lot more freedom and on which they expressed their own style more, as Pieter Both said on the popular Dutch TV show De Wereld Draait Door. The Original featured a popular cover of Krezip's "I Would Stay" featuring their lead singer Jacqueline Govaert.

Beef’s album, Favorites was released on 20 April 2009. To close a period of 10 years of performing, the band members selected their favorite songs and added two recordings that were previously unreleased on CD, to the track list. ("When Doves Cry" and "She Loves Me").

After a break of 3 years Beef did a small club tour at the end of 2012.

On June 26, 2022, guitarist Bram Wouters, also known as Irieginal Abraham of Beef, Soundsystem United Sounds and Kenny B, died at the age of 53 in his hometown of Weelde, Belgium. He had been ill for some time.

== Discography ==
- Babylon by Beef! (1999)
- Flexodus (2000)
- Beef! (2002)
- Last Rudy standing (2005)
- Last Rudies live - The singles (2007)
- The Original (2008)
- Favorites (2009)
