= Venice (band) =

American band

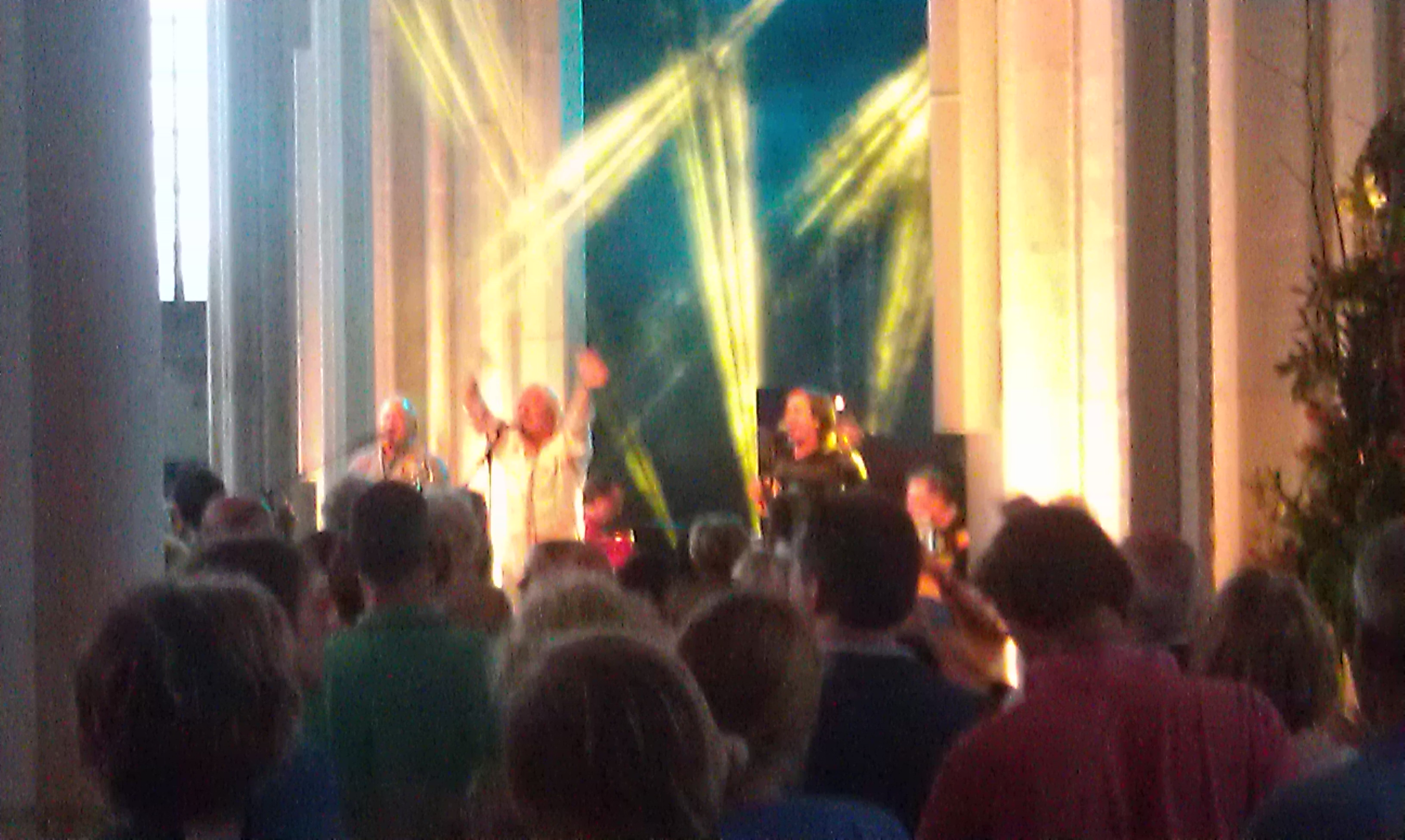
Venice performing in Nijmegen, Netherlands, in 2014

Venice is an American band comprising two pairs of brothers who are cousins which has achieved most popularity in The Netherlands.

== History ==
The band was formed in started in Venice, California in 1977 by cousins Michael Lennon and Kipp Lennon. Michael's brother Mark joined the band in 1978, followed by Kipp's brother Pat in 1980. Kipp and Pat are two of eleven siblings, and are younger brothers of the Lennon Sisters. Michael and Mark are two of thirteen siblings. Members of Venice have performed alongside, or recorded with, Bruce Springsteen, Don Henley, Elton John, Heart, Phil Collins, Sting, Melissa Etheridge, Cher, Ozzy Osbourne, Roger Waters Jackson Browne, David Crosby, Stevie Nicks, Billy Idol, Michael McDonald, Dave Mason, Tim Moyer, Chris Isaak, Robin Beck, Kenny Loggins, the Doobie Brothers, Styx, Brian Wilson, the Beach Boys, Dolly Parton, Linda Ronstadt, Bon Jovi, Michael Ruff, Warren Zevon and Dutch band Yellow Pearl.

In 1993, Venice shared the stage with Iron Maiden lead singer Bruce Dickinson in Jingu Stadium, Tokyo.

Venice found their biggest success in The Netherlands. In 2003, the band won an Edison Award (the Dutch version of the Grammy) for Best International Artist, beating out superstars U2 and Coldplay. Mark Lennon performed new backing vocals to the 2002 reissue of the 1980 Ozzy Osbourne album Blizzard of Ozz. The album also featured re-recorded bass and drum parts, much to the displeasure of Osbourne's longtime fans.

In 2011, Venice and David Crosby performed a fundraiser for Santa Monica High School's music department. The event also featured: Gerry Beckley and Dewey Bunnell from the band America plus Richard Page from Mr. Mister, along with students from the SanMo high school's orchestra, band, and choir. A high production value video was posted to YouTube.

The backing vocal duties on Roger Waters "The Wall Live Tour" from 2010-2013 The Wall Live were performed by Venice's Kipp, Mark, and Pat Lennon. Portions of this tour were captured for the film Roger Waters: The Wall, which was released theatrically worldwide on September 29, 2015.

== Members ==
The members of Venice are:

- Kipp Lennon - lead vocals, percussion
- Mark Lennon - lead vocals
- Michael Lennon - electric & acoustic guitar, vocals
- Pat Lennon - electric & acoustic guitar, vocals

Others who have performed with Venice

- Joseph Vigil - bass
- Steve Mayer - keyboards
- Michael Boehle - percussion
- Martijn Bosman - drums
- Nick Bult - keyboards
- Tano Costa - drums
- Scott Crago - drums / percussion
- Dann Gillen - drums
- André Kemp - drums
- Mark Harris - bass guitar
- Chris Horvath - keyboards
- Monroe Jones - keyboards
- Matt Laug - drums / percussion
- Ron Manaog - drums
- Rich Mangicaro - percussion
- Paul Mirkovich - keyboards
- Bob Philipse - drums
- Kevin Ricard - percussion
- Alexis Sklarevski - bass
- John Vester - acoustic guitar
- Jasper Westerhof - keyboards
- Jamie Wollam - drums

== Albums ==
- 2025 - Brunch Buffet 2 - Tasty Covers (Lennon Records)
- 2024 - Stained Glass (Lennon Records)
- 2019 - Jacaranda Street (Lennon Records)
- 2017 - Waves of Christmas - (Lennon Records)
- 2017 - Into the Morning Blue - (Lennon Records)
- 2016 - Brunch Buffet - Tasty Covers (Lennon Records)
- 2015 - Lucky 7 Part 1 - (Lennon Records)
- 2013 - What Summer Brings - double album (Lennon Records)
- 2009 - Electric - Live and Amplified (Lennon Records)
- 2008 - Venice Home Grown (CD/DVD combo)
- 2007 - Garage Demos Part III (self-released)
- 2006 - Amsterdam (Universal/Flow)
- 2006 - A Band Called Venice (Flow/Japan)
- 2004 - Pacific Standard Time (Flow)
- 2002 - Welcome To the Rest of Your Life (Columbia)
- 2000 - 2 Meter Sessies (Universal)
- 1999 - Spin Art (Vanguard)
- 1999 - Christmas With Venice (self-released)
- 1997 - Born and Raised (Vanguard)
- 1995 - Garage Demos Part I (self-released)
- 1995 - Garage Demos Part II (self-released)
- 1990 - Venice (album/CD) (Modern/Atlantic)
- 1986 - Do It Yourself (self-released LP)

== DVDs ==
- Venice Live (At The Royal Carre Theatre)
- Blue Paint (Music Video)
- 2 meter sessions (Harderwijk 1998 and Los Angeles 1999)
