= Back Against the Wall =

Studio album (tribute album) by Billy Sherwood
- Released: 2005
- Genre: Progressive rock
- Label: Purple Pyramid (Cleopatra Records)
- Producers: Billy Sherwood, Bob Kulick (4 tracks)

Back Against the Wall is a tribute album released in 2005 by Billy Sherwood in collaboration with other musicians to honour Pink Floyd's album The Wall. A year later, Sherwood followed it with the release of Return to the Dark Side of the Moon, a tribute to Pink Floyd's The Dark Side of the Moon.

The album was re-released in 2007 with additional tracks as A Tribute To Pink Floyd: Re-Building The Wall.

== Reception ==
Professional ratings
Review scores
Source	Rating
The Journal Star	3/5 stars

Edna Gundersen, of USA Today, found the album to be a "precisely—if coldly—produced [...] Xerox of the original" making it a "somewhat pointless excise" for anybody except "hard-core" Pink Floyd fans. On the other hand, Conrad Stinnett. writing in The Journal Star, found the album a "fun listen" which was "a fitting tribute" to the original.

== Track listing ==
All tracks by Roger Waters except noted. All credits adapted from liner notes.

=== Disc one ===
1. "In the Flesh?" (3:19)
  - Adrian Belew - Lead Vocal
  - Alan White - Drums
  - Keith Emerson - Organ
  - Gary Green - Guitars
  - John Giblin - Bass
  - Billy Sherwood - Keyboards, Vocals
  - Michael Sherwood - Vocals
2. "The Thin Ice" (2:29)
  - Ian Anderson - Vocals, Flute
  - Tony Levin - Bass
  - Gary Green - Guitars
  - Jay Schellen - Drums
  - Billy Sherwood - Keyboards, Backing Vocals
3. "Another Brick in the Wall Part I" (3:14)
  - Steve Morse - Lead Guitar
  - Billy Sherwood - Vocals, Keyboards, Electric Guitars, Bass
4. "The Happiest Days of Our Lives" (1:43)
  - Billy Sherwood - Vocals, Keyboards, Guitars, Bass
  - Vinnie Colaiuta - Drums
5. "Another Brick in the Wall Part II" (4:02)
  - Fee Waybill - Lead Vocals
  - Ronnie Montrose - Lead Guitar
  - Mike Porcaro - Bass
  - Alex Ligertwood and David Glen Eisley - Backing Vocals
  - Gregg Bissonette - Drums
  - Billy Sherwood - Keyboards
  - The Milikan Musical Theatre Children's Choir conducted by Leo Krubsack
6. "Mother" (5:58)
  - John Wetton - Vocals, Bass
  - Adrian Belew - Lead Guitar
  - Alan White - Drums
  - Billy Sherwood - Acoustic and Electric Guitars
7. "Goodbye Blue Sky" (2:44)
  - Steve Howe - Acoustic Guitars
  - Billy Sherwood - Vocals, Keyboards
  - Del Palmer - Bass
8. "Empty Spaces" (2:08)
  - Billy Sherwood - Vocals, Keyboards
  - Robby Krieger - Guitars
9. "Young Lust" (4:18) (written by Waters and David Gilmour)
  - Glenn Hughes - Vocals
  - Elliot Easton - Lead Guitar
  - Tony Franklin - Bass
  - Aynsley Dunbar - Drums
  - Bob Kulick - Electric Guitar
  - Billy Sherwood - Keyboards
10. "One of My Turns" (3:35)
  - Tommy Shaw - Lead Vocal, Guitars
  - Larry Fast - Keyboards
  - Jay Schellen - Drums
  - John Giblin - Bass
11. "Don't Leave Me Now" (4:08)
  - Tommy Shaw - Lead Vocal
  - Robby Krieger - Guitars
  - Jay Schellen - Drums
  - Billy Sherwood - Bass
  - Geoff Downes - Keyboards
12. "Another Brick in the Wall Part III" (1:39)
  - Steve Lukather - Lead Vocal, Guitars
  - Tony Levin - Bass
  - Jay Schellen - Drums
  - Steve Porcaro - Keyboards
13. "Goodbye Cruel World" (1:00)
  - Billy Sherwood - Vocals, Keyboards
  - Tony Levin - Bass

=== Disc two ===
1. "Hey You" (4:43)
  - John Wetton - Lead Vocal, Bass
  - Steve Lukather - Lead Guitar
  - Tommy Shaw - Acoustic Guitar
  - Alan White - Drums
  - Gary Green - Electric Guitars
  - Geoff Downes - Keyboards
  - Billy Sherwood - Vocals
2. "Is There Anybody Out There?" (2:39)
  - Adrian Belew - Acoustic Guitars
  - Billy Sherwood - Lead Vocal, Keyboards, Bass
  - Ian Anderson - Flute
  - Michael Sherwood - Backing Vocals
3. "Nobody Home" (3:11)
  - Rick Wakeman - Piano
  - Billy Sherwood - Lead Vocal, Orchestral Keyboards
4. "Vera" (1:22)
  - Tommy Shaw - Lead Vocal
  - Steve Howe - Acoustic Guitars
  - Billy Sherwood - Keyboards, Bass
5. "Bring the Boys Back Home" (1:04)
  - Billy Sherwood - Lead Vocal, Orchestral Keyboards
  - Jay Schellen - Snare Drum, Percussion, Backing Vocals
  - Michael Sherwood - Backing Vocals
6. "Comfortably Numb" (6:51) (written by Waters, Gilmour)
  - Chris Squire - Lead Vocal, Bass
  - Alan White - Drums
  - Billy Sherwood - Lead Vocal, Guitars, Keyboards
  - Jordan Berliant - Additional Acoustic Guitars
7. "The Show Must Go On" (1:39)
  - Adrian Belew - Lead Vocal
  - Vinnie Colaiuta - Drums
  - Billy Sherwood - Vocals, Keyboards, Guitars, Bass
  - Michael Sherwood - Backing Vocals
8. "In the Flesh" (4:19)
  - Billy Sherwood - Lead Vocal
  - Keith Emerson - Keyboards
  - Vinnie Colaiuta - Drums
  - Gary Green - Guitars
  - John Giblin - Bass
  - Michael Sherwood - Backing Vocals
9. "Run Like Hell (5:09)" (written by Waters, Gilmour)
  - Jason Scheff (misspelled on some pressings as "Chefe") - Vocals, Bass
  - Dweezil Zappa - Lead Guitar
  - Tony Kaye - Keyboard Solo
  - Aynsley Dunbar - Drums
  - Bob Kulick - Electric Guitars
  - Billy Sherwood - Keyboards
10. "Waiting for the Worms" (3:59)
  - Billy Sherwood - Lead Vocal, Guitars, Keyboards
  - Tony Levin - Bass, Stick
  - Vinnie Colaiuta - Drums
  - Keith Emerson - Organ Solo
  - Jim Ladd - Ranting and Raving
  - Michael Sherwood - Backing Vocals
11. "Stop" (0:33)
  - Billy Sherwood - Lead Vocals, Piano
12. "The Trial" (5:19) (written by Waters and Bob Ezrin)
  - Malcolm McDowell - Lead Vocal
  - Billy Sherwood - Orchestral Keyboards, Vocals
13. "Outside the Wall" (1:46) (featuring spoken interlude of Isn't This Where We Came In? by Billy Sherwood)
  - Billy Sherwood - Vocals, Keyboards
  - Jim Ladd - Narration
  - Michael Sherwood and Jay Schellen - Vocals
