= Pink Floyd – The Wall =

1982 film by Alan Parker

- Theatrical release poster
- Directed by: Alan Parker
- Screenplay by: Roger Waters
- Based on: The Wall by Pink Floyd
- Produced by: Alan Marshall
- Starring: Bob Geldof
- Cinematography: Peter Biziou
- Edited by: Gerry Hambling
- Music by: Pink Floyd; Bob Ezrin; Michael Kamen
- Production companies: Metro-Goldwyn-Mayer; Tin Blue Productions; Goldcrest Films International
- Distributed by: United International Pictures (United Kingdom); MGM/UA Communications Co. (United States)
- Release dates: 23 May 1982 (Cannes); 14 July 1982 (Empire Leicester Square); 6 August 1982 (United Kingdom)
- Running time: 95 minutes
- Countries: United Kingdom; United States
- Language: English
- Budget: $10–12 million
- Box office: $22.3 million

Pink Floyd – The Wall is a 1982 live-action/adult animated musical surrealist drama film directed by Alan Parker, based on Pink Floyd's 1979 studio album The Wall. The screenplay was written by Pink Floyd vocalist and bassist Roger Waters, with animation sequences directed by Gerald Scarfe. The Boomtown Rats' lead vocalist Bob Geldof made his film debut as rock star Pink, who, driven to neurosis by the pressures of stardom and traumatic events in his life, constructs an emotional and mental wall to protect himself. However, this coping mechanism eventually backfires, and Pink demands to be set free.

Like its associated album, the film is highly metaphorical, and frequently uses both visual and auditory symbolism throughout. It features little dialogue, instead being driven by the music from the album throughout. The songs used in the film have several differences from their album versions, and two of the songs included, "When the Tigers Broke Free" and "What Shall We Do Now?", do not appear on the album. Despite its turbulent production, the film received generally positive reviews, with praise for its music and animation, and it has an established cult following among Pink Floyd fans.

== Plot ==
Pink is a depressed rock star touring the United States. As he is discovered motionless and near-catatonic in his hotel room, the traumatic experiences that have brought him to this state surface, each represented as a "brick" in a psychological wall he has constructed around himself, ultimately isolating him from the world.

In Pink's infancy during World War II, his father is killed defending the Anzio beachhead, leaving him to be raised by his overbearing mother. As a boy he discovers relics of his father's military service and death, including some cartridges. Pink places one on railway tracks inside a tunnel. As a passing train fires the bullet, Pink visualizes the train towing cattle trucks filled with masked figures whose features are blurred and crude. A vision of a hostile schoolteacher then confronts him. As a student, Pink is caught writing poems and publicly humiliated by a teacher who reads one aloud before disciplining him; the teacher's own unhappiness stems from his strained marriage. Pink imagines the oppressive educational system as a nightmarish factory in which masked children are fed into a meat grinder. He fantasizes the children rebelling, burning the school, and throwing the teacher onto a bonfire.

As Pink matures, he recalls his mother's overprotectiveness as well as his troubled marriage set against the rise of his music career. While on tour, he phones home and learns of his wife's infidelity when a man answers. His alienation and rage intensifying, Pink fortifies his wall with materialistic possessions. The bitter and detached Pink brings a groupie to his hotel room, but she is driven away when Pink flies into a violent outburst and destroys the room over his inability to connect with her. Alone and despondent, he reviews the bricks of his wall and finally completes it.

Trapped behind the wall, Pink remains in his room and begins losing his mind to metaphorical "worms". He shaves off all his body hair and watches the war film The Dam Busters (1955), which reminds him of his lost father. In his mind, Pink, as a boy, searches through battle trenches, is frightened away by his traumatised adult self, and flees to a railway station where soldiers unite with their loved ones, but cannot find his father. In reality, Pink's manager finds him unresponsive and has a paramedic inject him with drugs so he can perform. Dragged to a limousine, he hallucinates a fleshy carapace forming over him, which he tears away to reveal a severe militaristic figure.

Pink envisions himself as a fascist orator and his concert as a neo-Nazi rally in London, and his followers attack minority groups in the streets. Eventually reaching a breaking point, Pink rejects the wall that has imprisoned him, and he cowers in a bathroom stall inside the venue as he mentally puts himself on trial. The surreal courtroom is an arena populated by writhing worms and grotesque figures acting as a prosecutor and judge; Pink himself is a passive rag doll charged with "showing feelings of an almost human nature". Distorted versions of his teacher and wife testify against him, and a version of his mother tries to take him home. The judge, represented as a giant walking pair of buttocks, sentences him to "be exposed before [his] peers" and orders the wall torn down. The battered wall explodes into rubble.

While Pink's ultimate fate remains unknown, children in reality clear debris and collect bricks, one of them emptying a Molotov cocktail. Over the credits, the final song shifts perspective to those outside of walls such as Pink's, who exhaust themselves battering their hearts against it.

== Cast ==
- Bob Geldof as Pink
  - Kevin McKeon as Young Pink
  - David Bingham as Little Pink
- Christine Hargreaves as Pink's mother
- Eleanor David as Pink's wife
- Alex McAvoy as Teacher
- Bob Hoskins as Rock manager
- Michael Ensign as Hotel manager
- James Laurenson as Pink's father
- Jenny Wright as American groupie
- Margery Mason as Teacher's wife
- Ellis Dale as English doctor
- James Hazeldine as Lover
- Ray Mort as Playground father
- Robert Bridges as American doctor
- Joanne Whalley, Nell Campbell, Emma Longfellow, and Lorna Barton as Groupies
- Philip Davis and Gary Olsen as Roadies

== Production ==
=== Concept ===
In the mid-1970s, as Pink Floyd gained mainstream fame, songwriter Roger Waters began feeling increasingly alienated from his audiences:

Audiences at those vast concerts are there for an excitement which, I think, has to do with the love of success. When a band or a person becomes an idol, it can have to do with the success that that person manifests, not the quality of work he produces. You don't become a fanatic because somebody's work is good, you become a fanatic to be touched vicariously by their glamour and fame. Stars—film stars, rock 'n' roll stars—represent, in myth anyway, the life as we'd all like to live it. They seem at the very centre of life. And that's why audiences still spend large sums of money at concerts where they are a long, long way from the stage, where they are often very uncomfortable, and where the sound is often very bad.

Waters was also dismayed by the "executive approach", which was only about success, not even attempting to get acquainted with the actual persons of whom the band was composed (addressed in an earlier song from Wish You Were Here, "Have a Cigar"). The concept of the wall, along with the decision to name the lead character "Pink", partly grew out of that approach, combined with the issue of the growing alienation between the band and their fans. This symbolised a new era for rock bands, as Pink Floyd explored "the hard realities of 'being where we are'", echoing ideas of alienation described by existentialists such as Jean-Paul Sartre.

=== Development ===
The animation segments, including the "marching hammers", were directed by Gerald Scarfe

Even before the original Pink Floyd album was recorded, the intention was to make a film from it. The original plan was for the film to be live footage from the album's tour, together with animations directed by Gerald Scarfe and extra scenes, and for Waters himself to star. EMI did not intend to make the film, as they did not understand the concept.

Director Alan Parker, a Pink Floyd fan, asked EMI whether The Wall could be adapted to film. EMI suggested that Parker talk to Waters, who had asked Parker to direct the film. Parker instead suggested that he produce it and give the directing task to Gerald Scarfe and Michael Seresin, a cinematographer. Waters began work on the film's screenplay after studying scriptwriting books. He and Scarfe produced a special-edition book containing the screenplay and art to pitch the project to investors. While the book depicted Waters in the role of Pink, after screen tests, he was removed from the starring role and replaced with new wave musician and frontman of the Boomtown Rats, Bob Geldof. In Behind the Wall, both Waters and Geldof later admitted to a story during casting where Geldof and his manager took a taxi to an airport, and Geldof's manager pitched the role to the singer, who continued to reject the offer and express his contempt for the project throughout the journey, unaware that the taxi driver was Waters' brother, who told Waters about Geldof's opinion.

Since Waters was no longer in the starring role, it no longer made sense for the feature to include Pink Floyd footage, so the live film aspect was dropped. The footage culled from the five Wall concerts at Earl's Court from 13–17 June 1981 that were held specifically for filming was deemed unusable also for technical reasons as the fast lenses needed for the low light levels turned out to have insufficient resolution for the movie screen. Complex parts such as "Hey You" still had not been properly shot by the end of the live shows. Parker convinced Waters and Scarfe that the concert footage was too theatrical and that it would jar with the animation and stage live action. After the concert footage was dropped, Seresin left the project and Parker became sole director.

Finance came in part from a British bank.

=== Filming ===
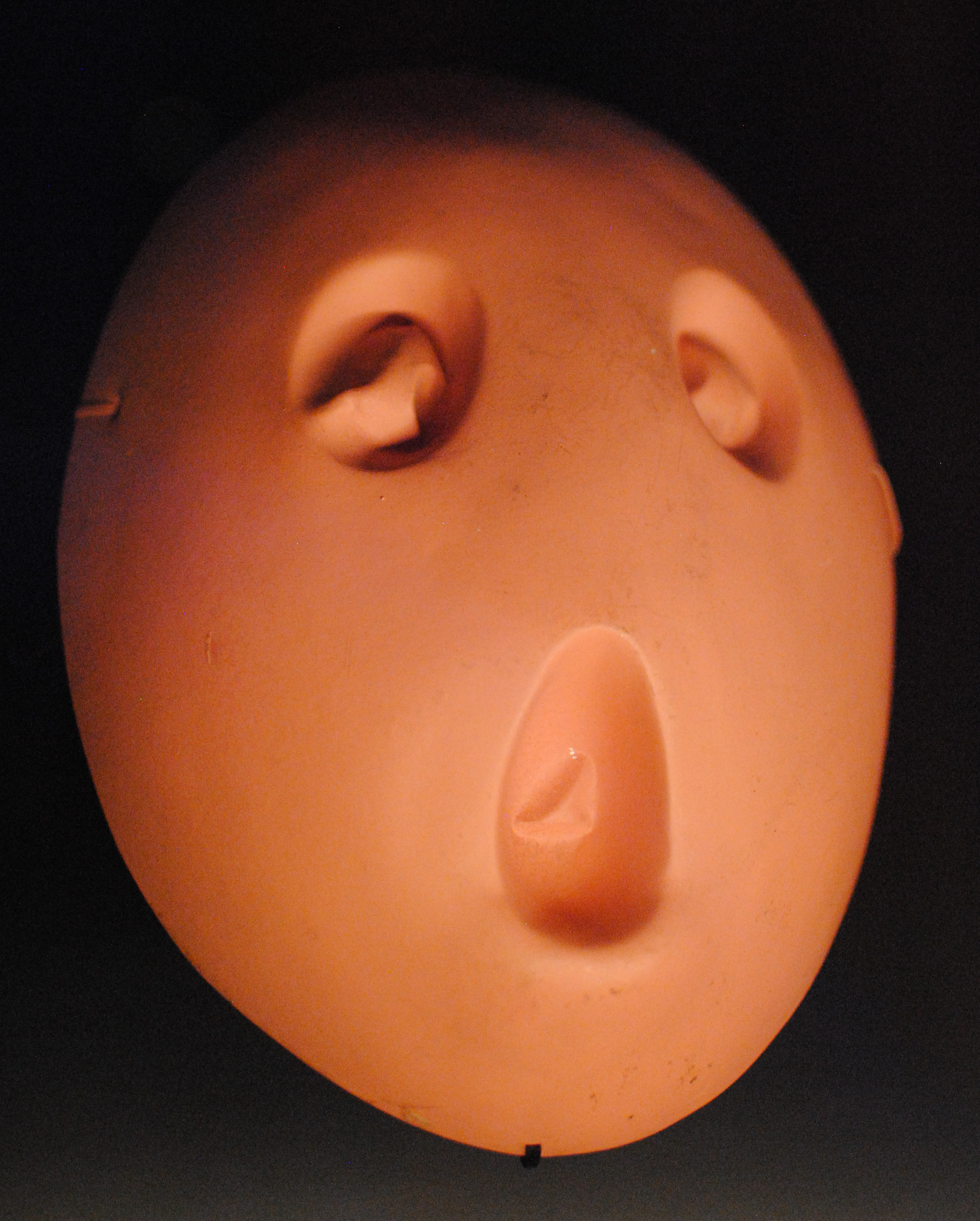
Blank of a mask worn by children in the classroom scenes; displayed at the Pink Floyd: Their Mortal Remains exhibition.

Parker, Waters and Scarfe frequently clashed during production, and Parker described the filming as "one of the most miserable experiences of my creative life." Scarfe declared that he would drive to Pinewood Studios carrying a bottle of Jack Daniel's, because "I had to have a slug before I went in the morning, because I knew what was coming up, and I knew I had to fortify myself in some way." Waters said that filming was "a very unnerving and unpleasant experience".

During production, while filming the destruction of a hotel room, Geldof suffered a cut to his hand as he pulled away the Venetian blinds. The footage remains in the film. It was discovered while filming the pool scenes that Geldof did not know how to swim. Interiors were shot at Pinewood Studios, and it was suggested that they suspend Geldof in Christopher Reeve's clear cast used for the Superman flying sequences, but his frame was too small by comparison; it was then decided to make a smaller rig that was a more acceptable fit, and he lay on his back. In Nicholas Schaffner's book Saucerful of Secrets: The Pink Floyd Odyssey (1991) it is claimed that the body cast from the film Supergirl (1984) was actually used instead.

The war scenes were shot on Saunton Sands in North Devon, which was also featured on the cover of Pink Floyd's A Momentary Lapse of Reason six years later.

== Release ==
The film was shown out of competition during the 1982 Cannes Film Festival.

The premiere at Cannes was amazing – the midnight screening. They took down two truckloads of audio equipment from the recording studios so it would sound better than normal. It was one of the last films to be shown in the old Palais which was pretty run down and the sound was so loud it peeled the paint off the walls. It was like snow – it all started to shower down and everyone had dandruff at the end. I remember seeing Terry Semel there, who at the time was head of Warner Bros., sitting next to Steven Spielberg. They were only five rows ahead of me and I'm sure I saw Steven Spielberg mouthing to him at the end when the lights came up, "what the fuck was that?" And Semel turned to me and then bowed respectfully.

"What the fuck was that?," indeed. It was like nothing anyone had ever seen before – a weird fusion of live-action, story-telling and of the surreal.

— Alan Parker

The film's official premiere was at the Empire, Leicester Square in London, on 14 July 1982. It was attended by Waters and fellow Pink Floyd members David Gilmour and Nick Mason, but not Richard Wright, who was no longer a member of the band. It was also attended by various celebrities including Geldof, Scarfe, Paula Yates, Pete Townshend, Sting, Roger Taylor, James Hunt, Lulu, and Andy Summers.

=== Box office ===
The Wall opened with a limited release in the United Kingdom on 6 August 1982, followed by the United States on 13 August. It entered at No. 28 of the US box office charts, despite only playing in one theatre on its first weekend, grossing over $68,000, a rare feat even by modern standards. The film then spent just over a month below the top 20 while still in the top 30. The film later expanded to over 600 theatres on 10 September, achieving No. 3 at the box office charts, below E.T. the Extra-Terrestrial and An Officer and a Gentleman. The film eventually earned $22 million before closing in early 1983.

=== Home media ===
PolyGram Music Video, Thorn EMI Video and MGM/UA Home Video each released VHS and Betamax editions in 1982 throughout Europe and South America.

MGM/UA Home Video released the film on VHS, Betamax and Laserdisc in November 1983 and reissues in 1987. Major reissues for VHS and Laserdisc in 1989, 1991, 1994, and 1997, with additional VHS reissues in 1999 and 2000, globally.

Both PolyGram Video and Columbia Music Video released VCDs during the mid to late 1990s

Columbia Music Video and SMV released the film on DVD in 1999 with many reissues since.

Blu-ray editions were released by Blackfire Productions in Spain, 2020 and Sinister Film in Italy, 2024

== Reception ==
=== Critical reception ===
The film received generally positive reviews. Review aggregator website Rotten Tomatoes gives the film the approval rating of 76% based on 29 critic reviews, with an average score of 7.40/10. Its critical consensus reads, "Pink Floyd's expression of generational angst is given striking visual form The Wall, although this ambitious feature's narrative struggles to marry its provocative images and psychedelic soundtrack into a compelling whole." On Metacritic, the film holds the weighted average score of 47 out of 100 based on 13 critic reviews, indicating "mixed or average reviews".

So it's difficult, painful and despairing, and its three most important artists came away from it with bad feelings. Why would anybody want to see it? Perhaps because filming this material could not possibly have been a happy experience for anyone—not if it's taken seriously.

— Roger Ebert

Reviewing The Wall on their television programme At the Movies, film critics Roger Ebert and Gene Siskel gave the film "two thumbs up". Ebert described it as "a stunning vision of self-destruction" and "one of the most horrifying musicals of all time ... but the movie is effective. The music is strong and true, the images are like sledge hammers, and for once, the rock and roll hero isn't just a spoiled narcissist, but a real, suffering image of all the despair of this nuclear age. This is a real good movie." Siskel was more reserved in his judgement, stating that he felt that the film's imagery was too repetitive. However, he admitted that the "central image" of the fascist rally sequence "will stay with me for an awful long time." In February 2010, Ebert added The Wall to his Great Movies list, describing the film as "without question the best of all serious fiction films devoted to rock. Seeing it now in more timid times, it looks more daring than it did in 1982, when I saw it at Cannes ... It's disquieting and depressing and very good." It was chosen for the opening night of Ebertfest 2010.

Danny Peary wrote that the "picture is unrelentingly downbeat and at times repulsive ... but I don't find it unwatchable – which is more than I could say if Ken Russell had directed this. The cinematography by Peter Biziou is extremely impressive and a few of the individual scenes have undeniable power." It earned two British Academy Awards: Best Sound for James Guthrie, Eddy Joseph, Clive Winter, Graham Hartstone and Nicholas Le Messurier, and Best Original Song for Waters.

Waters said of the film: "I found it was so unremitting in its onslaught upon the senses, that it didn't give me, anyway, as an audience, a chance to get involved with it," although he had nothing but praise for Geldof's performance.

Gilmour stated (on the "In the Studio with Redbeard" episodes of The Wall, A Momentary Lapse of Reason and On an Island) that the conflict between him and Waters started with the making of the film. Gilmour also stated on the documentary Behind The Wall (which was aired on the BBC in the UK and VH1 in the US) that "the movie was the less successful telling of The Wall story as opposed to the album and concert versions."

While Parker remained very proud of the final film, he would later admit in an interview that he never should've made the film, stating that making it was "too miserable an exercise for me to gain any pleasure from looking back at the process". He would remain friends with both Gilmour and Mason after completing it, but stayed hostile with Scarfe and would not see Waters again until 2011, when he was invited by the latter to a live performance of the album in London and was able to make peace with both.

Although the symbol of the crossed hammers used in the film was not related to any real group, it was adopted by white supremacist group the Hammerskins in the late 1980s.

=== Themes and analysis ===
It has been suggested that the protagonist stands for Waters. Beyond the obvious parallel of them both being rock stars, Waters lost his father while he was an infant and had marital problems, divorcing several times. It has also been suggested that Pink represents former lead singer, writer and founding member Syd Barrett, both in his appearance, although Geldof also bears a resemblance to Waters, as well as in several incidents and anecdotes related to Barrett's descent from pop stardom due to his struggles with mental illness and self-medicating with drugs.

One seemingly blatant reference is Pink's detachment from the world as he locks himself away in his room before a show, and shaves himself down while suffering a mental break. During a mental breakdown, Barrett shaved his head and face before showing up to a band rehearsal, after already having been removed from the band. Barrett also had shaved eyebrows when he visited the band during the Wish You Were Here recording. However, Bob Geldof, who plays Pink in the film, refused to shave his head for this part of the performance.

Another influence was the declining state of pianist Richard Wright, who was allegedly struggling with cocaine addiction at the time. This is referenced in the song Nobody Home: Got a grand piano to prop up my mortal remains.

Romero and Cabo place the Nazism and imperialism related symbols in the context of Margaret Thatcher's government and British foreign policy especially concerning the Falklands issue. The Thatcher involvement in the Falkland Islands would become the primary concept for their next album, The Final Cut.

"There's a scene in the movie of The Wall where the guy smashes up a hotel room and tries to put it together," remarked Trent Reznor, explaining the theme of Nine Inch Nails' The Fragile. "As he tries, it's obviously not right, but he's trying to make semblance [sic] of things. That's a visual that I've used in my head. It's helped me."

=== Awards ===
The Wall won two BAFTAs: Best Original Song (Roger Waters, for the song "Another Brick in the Wall") and Best Sound (James Guthrie, Eddy Joseph, Clive Winter, Graham V. Hartstone, Nicolas Le Messurier).

== Documentary ==
A documentary was produced about the making of Pink Floyd – The Wall entitled The Other Side of the Wall that includes interviews with Parker, Scarfe, and clips of Waters; it originally aired on MTV in 1982. A second documentary about the film was produced in 1999 entitled Retrospective: Looking Back at The Wall that includes interviews with Waters, Parker, Scarfe, and other members of the film's production team. Both are featured on The Wall DVD as extras.

== Soundtrack ==
Pink Floyd – The Wall

Soundtrack album by Pink Floyd
- Released: Unreleased
- Recorded: 1981–1982
- Genre: Progressive rock

Pink Floyd soundtracks chronology
Obscured by Clouds (1972)	Pink Floyd – The Wall (Unreleased)	La Carrera Panamericana (1992)

Singles from Pink Floyd – The Wall
- 1. "When the Tigers Broke Free" Released: 26 July 1982

The film soundtrack contains most songs from the album, albeit with several changes, as well as additional material (see table below).

The only songs from the album that are absent from in the film are "Hey You" and "The Show Must Go On". "Hey You" was deleted as Waters and Parker felt the footage was too repetitive (eighty percent of the footage appears in montage sequences elsewhere) but a workprint version of the scene is included as a bonus feature on the DVD release.

A soundtrack album from Columbia Records was listed in the film's end credits, but only a single containing "When the Tigers Broke Free" with the rerecorded "Bring the Boys Back Home" as a B-side was released. "When the Tigers Broke Free" later became a bonus track on the 2004 onwards version of the 1983 album The Final Cut, which guitarist David Gilmour dismissed as a collection of recycled songs that were rejected from The Wall. The song, in the edit used for the single, also appears on the 2001 compilation album Echoes: The Best of Pink Floyd.

With the exception of "When the Tigers Broke Free" and "Bring the Boys Back Home," none of the reworked Wall songs heard in the film have been officially released.

Changes on the soundtrack album
Song	Changes
"When the Tigers Broke Free, Part 1"	First part of a new song, edited into two sections strictly for the film but later released as one continuous song as a single in 1982 and later on the 2001 compilation Echoes: The Best of Pink Floyd and the 2004 re-release of The Final Cut.
"In the Flesh?"	Extended/re-mixed/lead vocal re-recorded by Geldof.
"The Thin Ice"	Extended/re-mixed with additional piano overdub in second verse, baby sounds removed.
"Another Brick in the Wall, Part 1"	Extra bass parts, which were muted on the album mix, can be heard.
"When the Tigers Broke Free, Part 2"	Second part of a new song, edited into two sections strictly for the film but later released as one continuous song as a single in 1982 and later on the 2001 compilation Echoes: The Best of Pink Floyd and the 2004 re-release of The Final Cut.
"Goodbye Blue Sky"	Re-mixed.
"The Happiest Days of Our Lives"	Re-mixed. Helicopter sounds dropped, teacher's lines re-recorded by Alex McAvoy.
"Another Brick in the Wall, Part 2"	Re-mixed with extra lead guitar, children's chorus edited and shortened, teacher's lines re-recorded by McAvoy and interspersed within lines of children's chorus.
"Mother"	Re-recorded completely with exception of guitar solo and its backing track. The lyric "Is it just a waste of time?" is replaced with "Mother, am I really dying?", which is what appeared on the original LP lyric sheet.
"What Shall We Do Now?"	A full-length song which begins with the music of, and a similar lyric to, "Empty Spaces". This was intended to be on the original album, and in fact appears on the original LP lyric sheet. At the last minute, it was dropped in favour of the shorter "Empty Spaces" (which was originally intended as a reprise of "What Shall We Do Now?"). A live version is on the album Is There Anybody Out There? The Wall Live 1980–81.
"Young Lust"	Screams added and phone call removed. The phone call was moved to the beginning of "What Shall We Do Now?".
"One of My Turns"	Re-mixed. Groupie's lines re-recorded by Jenny Wright.
"Don't Leave Me Now"	Shortened and remixed.
"Another Brick in the Wall, Part 3"	Re-recorded completely with a slightly faster tempo.
"Goodbye Cruel World"	Unchanged.
"Is There Anybody Out There?"	Classical guitar re-recorded, this time played with a leather pick by guitarist Tim Renwick, as opposed to the album version, which was played finger-style by Joe DiBlasi.
"Nobody Home"	Musically unchanged, but with different clips from the TV set.
"Vera"	Unchanged.
"Bring the Boys Back Home"	Re-recorded completely with brass band and Welsh male vocal choir extended and without Waters' lead vocals.
"Comfortably Numb"	Re-mixed with Geldof's screams added. Bass line completely different from album/alternate take. Guitar echoes from verse one also in verse two.
"In the Flesh"	Re-recorded completely with brass band and Geldof on lead vocals.
"Run Like Hell"	Re-mixed and shortened.
"Waiting for the Worms"	Shortened but with extended coda.
"5:11 AM (The Moment of Clarity)"/"Your Possible Pasts"/"Stop"	"Stop" re-recorded completely with Geldof unaccompanied on vocals. The first two songs are taken from The Pros and Cons of Hitch Hiking, a concept album Waters wrote simultaneously with The Wall, and later recorded solo; and The Final Cut, a 1983 Pink Floyd album. "Your Possible Pasts" was a song originally intended for The Wall that later appeared on The Final Cut. (Gary Yudman's concert intro from the live track "Master of Ceremonies" can be heard faintly in the background between Geldof screaming "Stop!" and quietly singing the rest of the track.)
"The Trial"	Re-mixed with longer instrumental intro, and audience cheering sounds added.
"Outside the Wall"	Re-recorded completely with brass band and Welsh male voice choir. Waters' lead vocal is sung rather than spoken. Extended with a musical passage similar to "Southampton Dock" from The Final Cut.

In addition to the above, Vera Lynn's rendition of "The Little Boy That Santa Claus Forgot" was used as background music during the opening scenes.

Chart positions

Year	Chart	Position
2002	Netherlands Dutchcharts.nl DVD Chart	No. 2
2002	Switzerland Hitparade.ch DVD Chart	No. 2
2005	Australian ARIA DVD Chart	No. 10

== Certifications ==
Certifications for Pink Floyd – The Wall
Region	Certification	Certified units/sales
Australia (ARIA)	11× Platinum	165,000^{^}
Brazil (Pro-Música Brasil)	Platinum	50,000^{*}
France (SNEP)	2× Platinum	40,000^{*}
Germany (BVMI)	2× Platinum	100,000^{^}
Italy	—	13,000
Poland (ZPAV)	Platinum	10,000^{*}
Sweden (GLF)	Gold	10,000^{^}
United Kingdom (BPI)	5× Platinum	250,000^{*}
^{*} Sales figures based on certification alone.^{^} Shipments figures based on certification alone.
