= Another Brick in the Wall: The Opera =

Opera based on Pink Floyd's The Wall

- Opera by Julien Bilodeau
- Original production art by Opéra de Montréal
- Librettist: Roger Waters
- Language: English
- Based on: The Wall by Pink Floyd
- Premiere: 11 March 2017; Opéra de Montréal

Another Brick in the Wall: The Opera is an opera by composer Julien Bilodeau and librettist Roger Waters, based on the concept album The Wall (1979) by the progressive rock band Pink Floyd, of which Waters is a founding member. It premiered at Opéra de Montréal in March 2017, and was produced by Cincinnati Opera in July 2018.

== History ==
Pierre Dufour, former general director of Opéra de Montréal, wrote to Pink Floyd co-founder and songwriter Roger Waters about the idea of an opera based on the Pink Floyd concept album The Wall (1979). Waters said that he replied to Dufour with a "rather pompous" letter which claimed that any conversion of rock music into orchestral music always became an "unmitigated disaster". However, the production team sent Waters computer-generated renditions of a few of composer Julien Bilodeau's pieces from the opera, and Waters was convinced to join and support the production as the librettist. Waters said he was "very moved" by the music and went into the project with "great enthusiasm". The opera premiered at Opéra de Montréal as part of the city of Montréal's 375th-anniversary celebration. Due to unprecedented sales, the Opéra de Montréal added three performances of the opera on top of the initial seven performances.

== Roles ==
Roles, voice types, premiere cast
Role	Voice type	Premiere cast, 11 March 2017 Conductor: Alain Trudel
Pink	baritone	Étienne Dupuis
The Mother	soprano	France Bellemare
The Father	tenor	Jean-Michel Richer
The Wife	soprano	Caroline Bleau
Vera Lynn	mezzo-soprano	Stéphanie Pothier
The Schoolmaster	tenor	Dominic Lorange
The Crown Prosecutor	baritone	Geoffroy Salvas
The Judge/The Doctor	bass	Marcel Beaulieu

== Synopsis ==
The opera's plot is taken directly from the 1982 movie Pink Floyd – The Wall (itself adapted from the 1979 concept album of the same name). A musician named Pink reflects on his lonely childhood through a swirl of flashbacks and chemically induced hallucinations. He watches as he constructs a symbolic wall around his life to cope with the death of his father, his overbearing mother, his depression, his drug addiction, and other emotional experiences. As he ages, his madness intensifies, and he hallucinates himself as a dictator and his concert audience as a neo-Nazi rally. This hallucination drives him to imagine a judge ruling him innocent, setting him free, and ordering the wall to be taken down.

== Music and instrumentation ==
In Another Brick in the Wall: The Opera, composer Julien Bilodeau shapes and builds upon the original music of Pink Floyd's album The Wall. While the album's lyrics, songs, and song order are maintained, Pink Floyd's original musical themes are extended by orchestral variations and interludes within the opera.

According to Cincinnati Opera's artistic director Evans Mirageas, Another Brick in the Wall is not a rock opera, but rather a standard opera, scored for eight soloists, 48 chorus members, and a 70-piece orchestra.

== Critical reception ==
The critical reception of this opera was mixed. Kory Grow of Rolling Stone said that the production team "[t]ransformed rock and roll into pure opera", and that this opera is "here to stay". Musical Toronto's Jennifer Liu noted that Another Brick in the Wall: The Opera "shines a glaring light on a society which grapples with conflicting models of openness to the world", and that the opera is an "immersive ride for the audience". Arthur Kaptainis of Montreal Gazette called the opera "a sullen, gloomy flop given the appearance of success". Graham Strahle from Music Australia added that this opera is "the perfect way" to "bring in new audiences outside [of opera's] traditional base".
