= The Wall =

1979 studio album by Pink Floyd

- Original 1979 Album Cover

Studio album by Pink Floyd
- Released: 30 November 1979
- Recorded: December 1978 – November 1979
- Studios: Britannia Row (London); Super Bear (Nice); Miraval (Correns); CBS 30th Street (New York); Producers Workshop (Los Angeles); Cherokee (Hollywood)
- Genres: Progressive rock; art rock
- Length: 81:03
- Labels: Harvest/EMI; Columbia/CBS
- Producers: Bob Ezrin; David Gilmour; James Guthrie; Roger Waters

Pink Floyd chronology
Animals (1977)	The Wall (1979)	A Collection of Great Dance Songs (1981)

Singles from The Wall
- 1. "Another Brick in the Wall, Part 2" Released: 23 November 1979; 2. "Run Like Hell" Released: April 1980; 3. "Comfortably Numb" Released: 23 June 1980

The Wall is the eleventh studio album by the English rock band Pink Floyd, released on 30 November 1979 by Harvest/EMI and Columbia/CBS Records. It is the last album to include all four post-Barrett–era band members. A double album rock opera, it follows the story of "Pink", a jaded rock star, as he builds a psychological "wall" of isolation around himself. The Wall topped the US charts for 15 weeks and reached number three in the UK. It initially received mixed reviews from critics, many of whom found it overblown and pretentious, but later received accolades as one of the greatest albums of all time.

The group's bassist Roger Waters conceived The Wall during Pink Floyd's 1977 In the Flesh tour, modelling the character of Pink after himself and former founding member Syd Barrett. Recording spanned from December 1978 to November 1979. Co-producer Bob Ezrin helped to refine the concept and bridge tensions during recording, as the band members were struggling with personal and financial problems. The group's keyboardist, Richard Wright, was fired by Waters during production but stayed on during the tour as a salaried musician.

Three singles were issued: "Another Brick in the Wall, Part 2" (Pink Floyd's only UK and US number-one single), "Run Like Hell", and "Comfortably Numb". From 1980 to 1981, Pink Floyd performed the album on a tour that featured elaborate theatrical effects. In 1982, The Wall was adapted into a feature film written by Waters. Some outtakes were used on the next Pink Floyd album, The Final Cut (1983).

The Wall is one of the best-known concept albums. With over 30 million copies sold, it is the second-best-selling Pink Floyd album behind The Dark Side of the Moon (1973), the best-selling double album of all time, and one of the best-selling albums of all time. In 2000, it was voted number 30 in Colin Larkin's All Time Top 1000 Albums. In 2003, 2012, and 2020, it was included in Rolling Stone's lists of the "500 Greatest Albums of All Time". From 2010 to 2013, Waters staged a new The Wall live tour that became one of the highest-grossing tours by a solo musician. In 2011, Waters declared The Wall to be his favourite album he recorded with Pink Floyd.

== Background ==
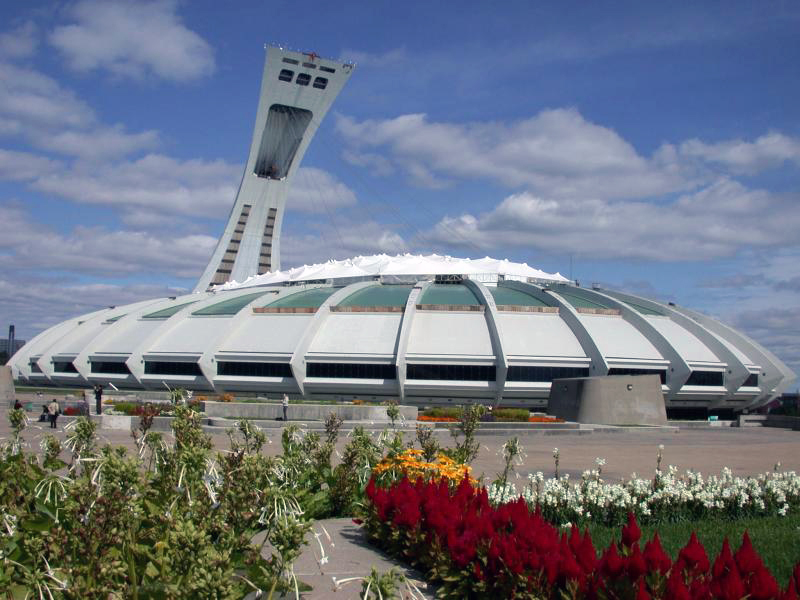
The album's concept was born out of an altercation with audience members at the Montreal Olympic Stadium, pictured in 2006.

Throughout 1977, Pink Floyd played the In the Flesh tour to promote their new album Animals. Roger Waters despised the experience – angered by the audience's rowdy behavior (such as setting off fireworks in the middle of songs) and convinced that they were not really listening to the music. During the final show on 6 July 1977 at the Montreal Olympic Stadium, a group of noisy and excited fans near the stage irritated Waters so much that he leaned over the side and spat on one of them. Waters said of the incident, "Immediately afterwards I was shocked by my behaviour. I realised that what had once been a worthwhile and manageable exchange between us (the band) and them (the audience) had been utterly perverted by scale, corporate avarice and ego. All that remained was an arrangement that was essentially sado-masochistic." That night, Waters spoke with producer Bob Ezrin and a psychiatrist friend of Ezrin's about the alienation and despair he was experiencing. He articulated his desire to isolate himself by constructing a wall across the stage between the band and the audience. The concept was an instant source of inspiration.

While Gilmour and Wright were in France recording solo albums, and the drummer, Nick Mason, was busy producing Steve Hillage's Green, Waters began to write material. The spitting incident became the starting point for a new concept, which explored the protagonist's self-imposed isolation after years of traumatic interactions with authority figures and the loss of his father as a child.

In July 1978, Pink Floyd reconvened at Britannia Row Studios, where Waters presented two new ideas for concept albums. The first was a 90-minute demo with the working title Bricks in the Wall. The second was about a man's dreams on one night, and dealt with marriage, sex, and the pros and cons of monogamy and family life versus promiscuity. The band chose the first option; the second eventually became Waters's debut solo studio album, The Pros and Cons of Hitch Hiking (1984).

By September, Pink Floyd were having financial problems and urgently needed to produce an album to make money. The financial planners Norton Warburg Group (NWG) had invested £1.3–3.3 million, up to £18 million in 2025, of the group's money in high-risk venture capital to reduce their tax liabilities. The strategy failed when many of the businesses NWG invested in lost money, leaving the band facing tax rates potentially as high as 83 per cent. Waters said: "Eighty-three per cent was a lot of money in those days and we didn't have it." Pink Floyd terminated their relationship with NWG, demanding the return of uninvested funds. (Note: Pink Floyd eventually sued NWG for £1 million, accusing them of fraud and negligence. NWG collapsed in 1981. Andrew Warburg fled to Spain, Norton Warburg Investments (a part of NWG) was renamed to Waterbrook, and many of its holdings were sold at a loss. Andrew Warburg was jailed for three years upon his return to the UK in 1987.) Gilmour said he became closely involved in the business side of Pink Floyd afterwards: "Ever since then, there's not a penny that I haven't signed for. I sign every cheque and examine everything."

To help manage the project's 26 tracks, Waters decided to bring in an outside producer and collaborator, feeling he needed "a collaborator who was musically and intellectually in a similar place to where I was". They hired Ezrin at the suggestion of Waters's then-wife Carolyne Christie, who had worked as Ezrin's secretary. Ezrin had previously worked with Alice Cooper, Lou Reed, Kiss, and Peter Gabriel. From the start, Waters made it clear who was in charge, telling him: "You can write anything you want. Just don't expect any credit."

Waters and Ezrin worked mostly on the story, improving the concept. Ezrin presented a 40-page script to the rest of the band, with positive results. He recalled: "The next day at the studio, we had a table read, like you would with a play, but with the whole of the band, and their eyes all twinkled, because then they could see the album." Ezrin broadened the storyline, distancing it from the autobiographical work Waters had written and basing it on a composite character named Pink. The engineer Nick Griffiths later said: "Ezrin was very good in The Wall, because he did manage to pull the whole thing together. He's a very forceful guy. There was a lot of argument about how it should sound between Roger and Dave, and he bridged the gap between them." Waters wrote most of the album, with Gilmour co-writing "Comfortably Numb", "Run Like Hell", and "Young Lust", and Ezrin co-writing "The Trial".

== Concept and storyline ==
Another Brick in the Wall, Pt. 2
The disco beat used in "Another Brick in the Wall Part 2" presented a marked change from Pink Floyd's previous releases.

The Wall is a rock opera that explores abandonment, cycles of violence, and isolation, symbolized by a wall. The songs create a storyline of events in the life of Pink, a fictional rock star based on Waters and Pink Floyd's former frontman Syd Barrett. The first half of the album largely features events from Waters' childhood and young adulthood, such as the death of his father in WWII, and his wife's infidelity. The album also includes several references to Barrett, namely the track "Nobody Home", which mirrors lyrically one of Barrett's final songs for the Floyd, the unreleased B-side "Vegetable Man" through descriptions of the narrator's possessions and character. "Comfortably Numb" was inspired by Waters' injection with a muscle relaxant to combat the effects of hepatitis during the In the Flesh tour in Philadelphia. In the song "In the Flesh", Waters "imagines himself as a fascist dictator".

=== Plot ===
The album opens with Pink, a rock star, addressing a crowd of fans at one of his concerts, to whom he is about to give an apparently unexpected performance of his life story ("In the Flesh?"). A flashback on his life up to that point begins, in which it is revealed that his father was killed during World War II, leaving Pink's mother to raise him alone ("The Thin Ice"). Beginning with the death of his father, Pink starts to build a metaphorical wall around himself ("Another Brick in the Wall, Part 1"). Growing older, Pink is tormented at school by tyrannical, abusive teachers ("The Happiest Days of Our Lives"), and memories of these traumas become metaphorical "bricks in the wall" ("Another Brick in the Wall, Part 2").

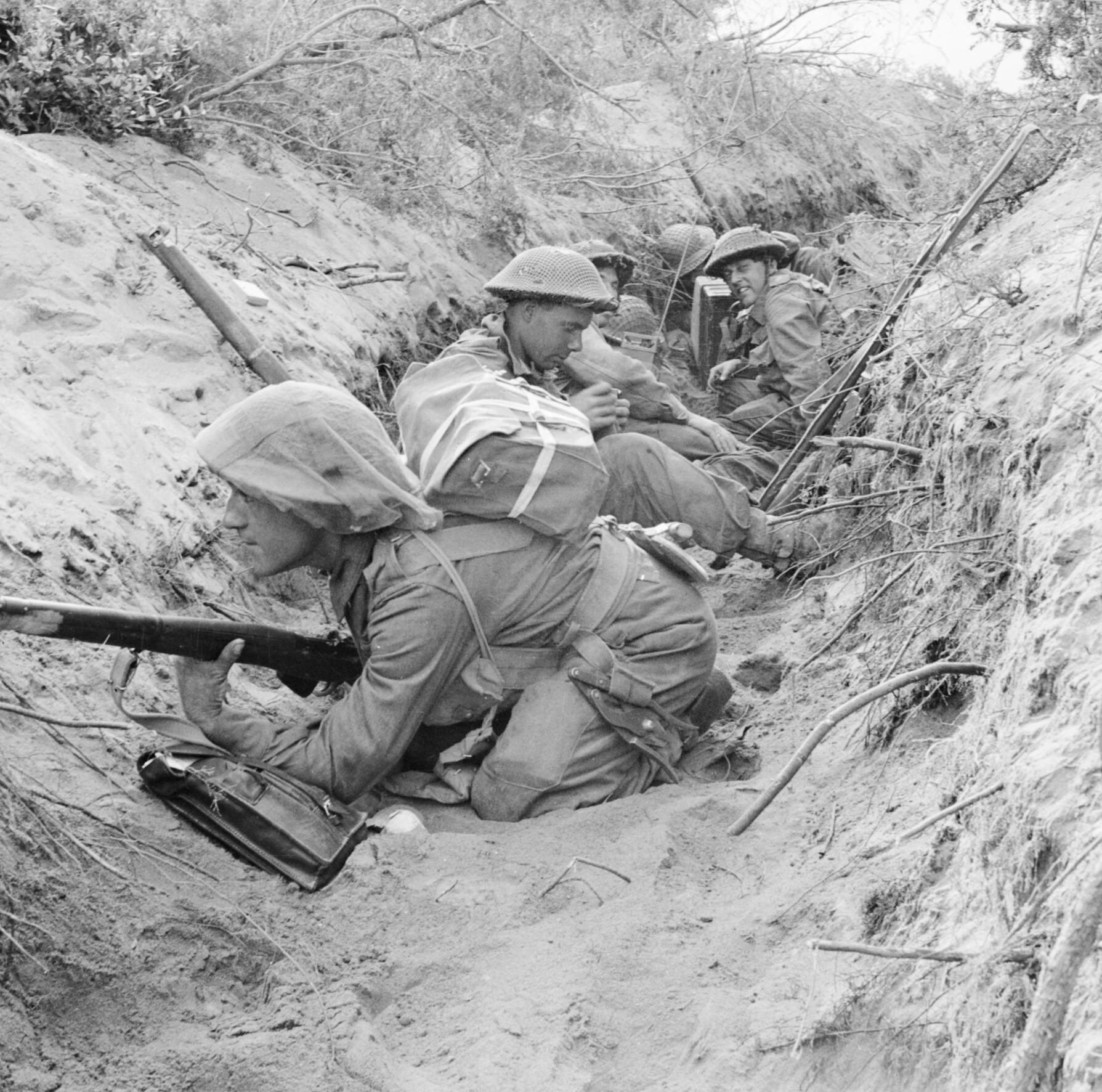
The death of Pink's father during the Battle of Anzio (pictured) forms the backdrop of the story.

Now an adult, Pink remembers his domineering, overprotective mother ("Mother") and his upbringing during the Blitz ("Goodbye Blue Sky"). Pink soon marries, and after more "bricks" are created through more traumas, he is preparing to complete his "wall" ("Empty Spaces"). While touring in the United States, he seeks casual sex to relieve the tedium of touring, though in making a phone call home, he learns of his wife's infidelity ("Young Lust"). He brings a groupie back to his hotel room, only to trash it in a violent fit of rage, terrifying her out of the room ("One of My Turns"). Depressed, Pink thinks about his wife and fantasizes about committing violence against her ("Don't Leave Me Now"). Feeling trapped, he dismisses the impact his past has had on him while rejecting human contact and medication ("Another Brick in the Wall, Part 3"). Pink's wall is now finished, completely isolating him from the outside world ("Goodbye Cruel World").

Immediately after the wall's completion, Pink questions his decisions ("Hey You") and locks himself in his hotel room ("Is There Anybody Out There?"). As his depression worsens, Pink turns to his possessions for comfort ("Nobody Home"), and yearns for the idea of reconnecting with his personal roots ("Vera"). Pink's mind flashes back to World War II, with the people demanding that the soldiers return home ("Bring the Boys Back Home"). Returning to the present, Pink's manager and roadies break into his hotel room, where they find him unresponsive. A paramedic injects him with drugs to enable him to perform at a concert later that night ("Comfortably Numb").

The drugs kick in, resulting in a hallucinatory on-stage performance ("The Show Must Go On") where he believes that he is a fascist dictator, and that his concert is a neo-Nazi rally, at which he sets brownshirt-like men on fans that he considers unworthy ("In the Flesh"). He proceeds to attack minorities ("Run Like Hell"), culminating in him imagining holding a violence-inciting rally in suburban London ("Waiting for the Worms"). Pink's hallucination then ceases, and he begs for everything to stop ("Stop"). Tormented with guilt, Pink places himself on trial before his inner judge, who orders him to "tear down the wall" as punishment for his actions ("The Trial"). This is the opening of Pink to the outside world ("Outside the Wall").

The album turns full circle with its closing words "Isn't this where...", the first words of the phrase that begins the album, "...we came in?", with a continuation of the melody of the last song hinting at the cyclical nature of Waters' theme, and that the existential crisis at the heart of the album will never truly end.

== Production ==
=== Recording ===
The Wall was recorded in several locations. Super Bear Studios in France was used between January and July 1979, and Waters recorded his vocals at the nearby Studio Miraval. Michael Kamen supervised the orchestral arrangements at CBS Studios in New York in September. Over the next two months the band used Cherokee Studios, Producers Workshop and The Village Recorder in Los Angeles. A plan to work with the Beach Boys at the Sundance Productions studio in Los Angeles was cancelled (although Beach Boys member Bruce Johnston does sing backing vocals on "In the Flesh?", "The Show Must Go On", the side 4 version of "In the Flesh", and "Waiting for the Worms").

James Guthrie, recommended by previous Floyd collaborator Alan Parsons, arrived early in the production process. He replaced engineer Brian Humphries, who was emotionally drained by his five years with the band. Guthrie was hired as a co-producer, but was initially unaware of Ezrin's role: "I saw myself as a hot young producer ... When we arrived, I think we both felt we'd been booked to do the same job." The early sessions at Britannia Row were emotionally charged, as Ezrin, Guthrie and Waters each had strong ideas about the direction the album would take. Relations within the band were at a low ebb, and Ezrin became an intermediary between Waters and the rest of the band.

As Britannia Row was initially regarded as inadequate for The Wall, the band upgraded much of its equipment, and by March another set of demos was complete. However, their former relationship with NWG placed them at risk of bankruptcy, and they were advised to leave the UK by no later than 6 April 1979, for a minimum of one year. As non-residents they would pay no UK taxes during that time, and within a month all four members and their families had left. Waters moved to Switzerland, Mason to France, and Gilmour and Wright to the Greek Islands. Some equipment from Britannia Row was relocated in Super Bear Studios near Nice. Gilmour and Wright were both familiar with the studio and enjoyed its atmosphere, having recorded solo albums there. While Wright and Mason lived at the studio, Waters and Gilmour stayed in nearby houses. Mason later moved into Waters's villa near Vence, while Ezrin stayed in Nice.

Ezrin's poor punctuality caused problems with the tight schedule followed by Waters. Mason found Ezrin's behaviour "erratic", but used his elaborate and unlikely excuses for his lateness as ammunition for "tongue-in-cheek resentment". Ezrin's share of the royalties was less than the rest of the band and he viewed Waters as a bully, especially when Waters mocked him by having badges made that read NOPE (No Points Ezrin), alluding to his lesser share. Ezrin later said he had had marital problems and was not "in the best shape emotionally".

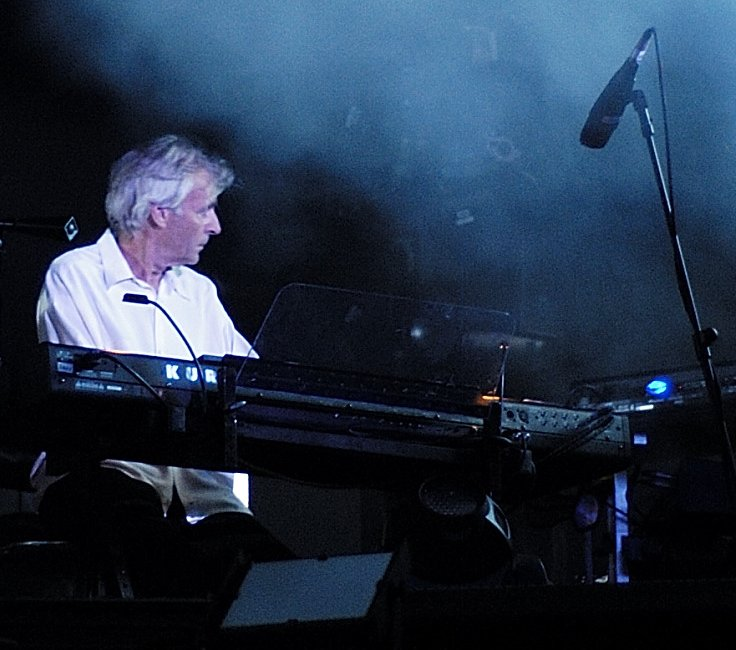
Waters' relationship with Richard Wright (pictured in 2006) collapsed during production, leading to Wright's firing.

More problems became apparent when Waters's relationship with Wright broke down. The band were rarely in the studio together. Ezrin and Guthrie spliced Mason's previously recorded drum tracks together, and Guthrie worked with Waters and Gilmour during the day, returning at night to record Wright's contributions. Wright, worried about the effect that the introduction of Ezrin would have on band relationships, was keen to have a producer's credit on the album. Their albums since More (1969) had credited production to "Pink Floyd".

Waters agreed to a trial period with Wright producing, after which he was to be given a producer's credit, but after a few weeks he and Ezrin expressed dissatisfaction with Wright's methods. A confrontation with Ezrin led to Wright working only at nights. Gilmour also expressed his annoyance, complaining that Wright's lack of input was "driving us all mad". Ezrin later reflected: "it sometimes felt that Roger was setting him up to fail. Rick gets performance anxiety. You have to leave him alone to freeform, to create ..."

Wright was troubled by a failing marriage and the onset of depression, exacerbated by his non-residency. While the other band members brought their children, Wright's children were older and could not join as they were attending school; he said he missed them "terribly". The band's holidays were booked for August, after which they were to reconvene at Cherokee Studios in Los Angeles, but Columbia offered the band a better deal in exchange for a Christmas release of the album. Waters increased the band's workload accordingly, booking time at the nearby Studio Miraval. He also suggested recording in Los Angeles ten days earlier than agreed, and hiring another keyboardist to work alongside Wright, whose keyboard parts had not yet been recorded. Wright refused to cut short his family holiday in Rhodes.

Accounts of Wright's subsequent departure from the band differ. In his autobiography, Inside Out, Mason says that Waters called the band's manager, Steve O'Rourke, who was travelling to the US on the Queen Elizabeth 2, and told him to have Wright out of the band by the time Waters arrived in LA to mix the album. In another version recorded by a later historian of the band, Waters called O'Rourke and asked him to tell Wright about the new recording arrangements, to which Wright responded: "Tell Roger to fuck off". Wright denied this, stating that the band had agreed to record only through the spring and early summer, and that he had no idea they were so far behind schedule. Mason later wrote that Waters was "stunned and furious", and felt that Wright was not doing enough.

Gilmour was on holiday in Dublin when he learnt of Waters's ultimatum, and tried to calm the situation. He later spoke with Wright and gave him his support, but reminded him about his minimal contributions. Waters insisted that Wright leave, or he would refuse to release The Wall. Several days later, worried about their financial situation and the failing interpersonal relationships within the band, Wright quit. News of his departure was kept from the music press. Although his name did not appear on some editions of the album (it does appear on the UK gatefold sleeve), he was employed as a session musician on the band's subsequent tour.

By August 1979, the running order was largely complete. Wright completed his duties at Cherokee Studios aided by session musicians Peter Wood and Fred Mandel, and Jeff Porcaro played drums in Mason's stead on "Mother". Mason left the final mix to Waters, Gilmour, Ezrin and Guthrie, and travelled to New York to record his debut solo album, Nick Mason's Fictitious Sports. In advance of its release, technical constraints led to some changes to the running order and content of The Wall, with "What Shall We Do Now?" replaced by the similar but shorter "Empty Spaces", and "Hey You" being moved from the end of side three to the beginning. With the November 1979 deadline approaching, the band left the inner sleeves of the album unchanged.

=== Instrumentation ===
"Comfortably Numb"
Planet Rock listeners voted "Comfortably Numb"'s two guitar solos the greatest of all time.

Mason's early drum sessions were performed in an open space on the top floor of Britannia Row Studios. The 16-track recordings from these sessions were mixed down and copied onto a 24-track master, as guide tracks for the rest of the band to play to. This gave the engineers greater flexibility, (Note: As well as being more flexible, repeated replay of magnetic tape can, over time, reduce the quality of the recorded material.) but also improved the audio quality of the mix, as the original 16-track drum recordings were synced to the 24-track master and the duplicated guide tracks removed. Ezrin later related the band's alarm at this method of working – they apparently viewed the erasure of material from the 24-track master as "witchcraft".

While at Super Bear studios, Waters agreed to Ezrin's suggestion that several tracks, including "Nobody Home", "The Trial" and "Comfortably Numb", should have an orchestral accompaniment. Michael Kamen, who had previously worked with David Bowie, was booked to oversee these arrangements, which were performed by musicians from the New York Philharmonic and New York Symphony Orchestras, and a choir from the New York City Opera. Their sessions were recorded at CBS Studios in New York without Pink Floyd present. Kamen eventually met the band once recording was complete.

I think things like 'Comfortably Numb' were the last embers of mine and Roger's ability to work collaboratively together.

— David Gilmour

"Comfortably Numb" has its origins in Gilmour's debut solo album, and was the source of much argument between Waters and Gilmour. Ezrin claimed that the song initially started life as "Roger's record, about Roger, for Roger", but he thought that it needed further work. Waters changed the key of the verse and added more lyrics to the chorus, and Gilmour added extra bars for the line "I have become comfortably numb". Gilmour's "stripped-down and harder" recording was not to Waters's liking; Waters preferred Ezrin's "grander Technicolor, orchestral version". Following a major argument in a North Hollywood restaurant, the two compromised; the song's body included the orchestral arrangement, with Gilmour's second and final guitar solo standing alone.

=== Sound design ===
Waters and Ezrin oversaw the capture of the album's sound effects. Waters recorded the phone call used on the original demo for "Young Lust", but neglected to inform its recipient, Mason, who assumed it was a prank call and angrily hung up. A real telephone operator was also an unwitting participant. The call references Waters' viewpoint of his bitter 1975 divorce from first wife Judy. Waters also recorded ambient sounds along Hollywood Boulevard by hanging a microphone from a studio window. Engineer Phil Taylor recorded some of the screeching tyre noises on "Run Like Hell" from a studio car park, and a television set being destroyed was used on "One of My Turns". At Britannia Row Studios, Nick Griffiths recorded the smashing of crockery for the same song. Television broadcasts were used, and one actor, recognising his voice, accepted a financial settlement from the group in lieu of legal action against them.

The Trial
The album culminates with Pink's internal trial, leading to the collapse of his 'wall'.

The maniacal schoolmaster was voiced by Waters, and actress Trudy Young supplied the groupie's voice. Backing vocals were performed by a range of artists, although a planned appearance by the Beach Boys on "The Show Must Go On" and "Waiting for the Worms" was cancelled by Waters, who instead settled for Beach Boy Bruce Johnston and Beach Boys touring musician Toni Tennille.

Ezrin's suggestion to release "Another Brick in the Wall, Part 2" as a single with a disco-style beat did not initially find favour with Gilmour, although Mason and Waters were more enthusiastic. Waters opposed releasing a single, but became receptive once he listened to Ezrin and Guthrie's mix. With two identical verses the song was felt to be lacking, and so a copy was sent to Griffiths in London with a request to find children to perform several versions of the lyrics. Griffiths contacted Alun Renshaw, head of music at the nearby Islington Green school, who was enthusiastic, saying: "I wanted to make music relevant to the kids – not just sitting around listening to Tchaikovsky. I thought the lyrics were great – 'We don't need no education, we don't need no thought control ...' I just thought it would be a wonderful experience for the kids."

Griffiths first recorded small groups of pupils and then invited more, telling them to affect a Cockney accent and shout rather than sing. He multitracked the voices, making the groups sound larger, before sending his recordings back to Los Angeles. The result delighted Waters, and the song was released as a single, becoming a Christmas number one. There was some controversy when the British press reported that the children had not been paid for their efforts; they were eventually given copies of the album, and the school received a £1,000 donation (£4,000 in 2025).

== Release ==
When the completed album was played for an assembled group of executives at Columbia's headquarters in California, several were reportedly unimpressed by what they heard. Matters had not been helped when Columbia Records offered Waters smaller publishing rights on the grounds that The Wall was a double album, a position he did not accept. When one executive offered to settle the dispute with a coin toss, Waters asked why he should gamble on something he owned. He eventually prevailed. The record company's concerns were alleviated when "Another Brick in the Wall, Part 2" reached number one in the UK, US, Norway, Portugal, West Germany and South Africa. It was certified platinum in the UK in December 1979, and platinum in the US three months later. In Germany, the album reached the one million sales mark within three months of its release. In Canada, the album was No. 1 for 13 weeks and had sold 830,000 copies by January 1981.

The Wall was released in the UK and in the US on 30 November 1979. (Note: EMI Harvest SHDW 411 (double album)) Coinciding with its release, Waters was interviewed by veteran DJ Tommy Vance, who played the album in its entirety on BBC Radio 1. It was reissued in three versions as part of the Why Pink Floyd...? campaign, which featured a massive restoration of the band's catalogue with remastering by producer James Guthrie: a "Discovery" edition in 2011, featuring the remastered version with no extras, and the "Experience" edition, which adds a bonus disc of unreleased material and other supplementary items, and the "Immersion" edition, a seven-disc collection that also adds video materials, in 2012.

=== Artwork and packaging ===
The album's cover art is one of Pink Floyd's most minimal – a white brick wall and no text. Waters had a falling out with Hipgnosis designer Storm Thorgerson a few years earlier when Thorgerson had included the cover of Animals in his book The Work of Hipgnosis: 'Walk Away René'. The Wall is therefore the first album cover of the band since The Piper at the Gates of Dawn not to be created by the design group.

Issues of the album included the lettering of the artist name and album title by cartoonist Gerald Scarfe, either as a sticker on sleeve wrapping or printed onto the cover itself, in either black or red. Scarfe, who had previously created animations for the band's In the Flesh tour, also created the LP's inside sleeve art and labels of both vinyl records of the album, showing the eponymous wall in various stages of construction, accompanied by characters from the story.

The drawings were translated into dolls for The Wall Tour, as well as into Scarfe's animated segments shown during the tour and the film based on the album. It is notable that the stadium drawn in the inner sleeve highly resembles the Montreal Olympic Stadium where the album's concept happens to find its origin. It seems plausible that the artist was inspired by the stadium's appearance in 1977 and its inclined tower which was completed only at a third of its projected (and present) height, reminiscent of the many "towers" pictured in the artist's stadium.

== Critical reception ==
Professional ratings
Review scores
Source	Rating
AllMusic	4.5/5 stars
The Daily Telegraph	3/5 stars
The Encyclopedia of Popular Music	5/5 stars
The Great Rock Discography	9/10
MusicHound Rock	5/5 stars
The Rolling Stone Album Guide	3/5 stars
Smash Hits	8/10
Sputnikmusic	5/5
The Village Voice	B−

Critical reception upon release was mixed. Reviewing for Rolling Stone in February 1980, Kurt Loder hailed it as "a stunning synthesis of Waters's by now familiar thematic obsessions" that "leaps to life with a relentless lyrical rage that's clearly genuine and, in its painstaking particularity, ultimately horrifying." By contrast, The Village Voice critic Robert Christgau regarded it as "a dumb tribulations-of-a-rock-star epic" backed by "kitschy minimal maximalism with sound effects and speech fragments", adding in The New York Times that its worldview is "self-indulgent" and "presents the self-pity of its rich, famous and decidedly post-adolescent protagonist as a species of heroism". Melody Maker declared, "I'm not sure whether it's brilliant or terrible, but I find it utterly compelling."

The album topped the US Billboard 200 chart for 15 weeks, selling over a million copies in its first two months of sales and in 1999, it was certified 23× platinum by the Recording Industry Association of America (RIAA). (Note: As a double album 23× platinum signifies sales of 11.5 million.) It remains one of the best-selling albums of all time in the US, having sold over 19 million copies worldwide between 1979 and 1990. The Wall is Pink Floyd's second-best selling album after their eighth studio album The Dark Side of the Moon (1973). Engineer James Guthrie's efforts were rewarded in 1980 with a Grammy Award for Best Engineered Recording (non-classical), and the album was nominated for the Grammy Award for Album of the Year. Rolling Stone placed it at number 87 on its "500 Greatest Albums of All Time" list in 2003, maintaining the rating in a 2012 revised list, although this was updated to 129 with the list's 2020 revision. The album was also included in the book 1001 Albums You Must Hear Before You Die (2006). In 2008, The Wall was inducted into the Grammy Hall of Fame.

In retrospective, Billy Corgan of the Smashing Pumpkins praised The Wall during his speech at the Pink Floyd induction ceremony at the Rock and Roll Hall of Fame. In his teens, he felt the album was: "..too creepy, too intense, too nihilistic. And, of course, these are all the things that I believe in now… But at twenty-eight years old, it's one of the bravest records I've ever heard. And I really can't point to anything else that's ever summed up everything that's fucked up about life; everything that's fucked up about rock. It takes on politics, hero worship, rock 'n' roll, and our desires to connect with the universe, all in one fell swoop. It really, truly, is an amazing testament to how far they were willing to go to reach the outer limits of what's important." "The Wall is stupefyingly good," Waters declared in 1992. "Christ, what a brilliant idea that was. It holds together so well… And of course Dave's musical influence on that was considerable. Despite what has happened between us since then, I still have great respect for him as a guitarist."

== Tour ==
The Wall Tour was launched at the Los Angeles Memorial Sports Arena on 7 February 1980. Touring continued throughout 1980 and 1981 in New York, London, and Dortmund. In comparison to previous tours, the audiences were much smaller to support the album's concept of alienation from society. By this time, Pink Floyd concerts had garnered a reputation for spectacle, and The Wall Tour built upon it. Most famously each show featured a 40-foot (12 m) wall of 340 cardboard bricks, gradually constructed between the band and the audience. Gerald Scarfe projected a series of animations onto the wall. At his London studio, he employed a team of 40 animators to create Pink's nightmarish visions, many of which were re-used in the film version of The Wall.

Unbeknownst to the audience, at the beginning of each show the members of Pink Floyd had been substituted with a "surrogate band" wearing hyper-realistic face masks of each of the actual members. At the end of the opening number ("In the Flesh?"), the surrogates froze in place, and lights revealed the actual band behind them. The surrogates would then later re-appear without the masks as backing musicians. Throughout the show, three characters taken from The Wall made appearances as giant inflatables looming over the stage – Pink's schoolmaster, his mother, and his wife. During "In the Flesh", an inflatable pig also floated over the audience (a carryover from prior tours), this time sporting a crossed hammers logo that matched the uniforms of the band and stage crew. Along with the original album tracks, the tour featured an instrumental medley, "The Last Few Bricks", played before "Goodbye Cruel World" to allow the construction crew to complete the wall. "Empty Spaces" was replaced by a longer version of the track, "What Shall We Do Now?".

During the tour, band relationships dropped to an all-time low; at one point, they stayed in four Winnebagos parked in a circle with the doors facing away from the centre. Waters, however, used his own vehicle to arrive at the venue, and stayed in separate hotels from the rest of the band. Ultimately, Wright, returning as a salaried musician, was the only member of the band to profit from the tour, which lost about £400,000.

== Adaptations ==
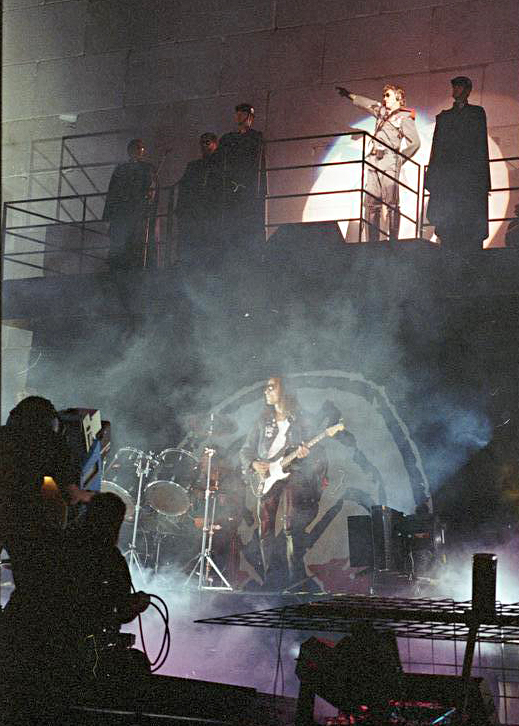
Waters (in spotlight), dressed in military attire, performing at The Wall – Live in Berlin, 1990

A film adaptation, Pink Floyd – The Wall, was released by Metro-Goldwyn-Mayer in July 1982. It was written by Waters and directed by Alan Parker, with Bob Geldof as Pink. It used Scarfe's animation alongside actors, with little conventional dialogue. A modified soundtrack was created for some of the film's songs.

On 21 July 1990, Waters and producer Tony Hollingsworth created The Wall – Live in Berlin, staged for charity at a site once occupied by part of the Berlin Wall. The concert included several artists and celebrities popular at the time, including Scorpions, Cyndi Lauper, Sinéad O'Connor, Joni Mitchell, Ute Lemper, Tim Curry, Van Morrison, Thomas Dolby, and Bryan Adams among others.

In 2000, Pink Floyd released Is There Anybody Out There? The Wall Live 1980–81, which contains portions of various live shows from the Wall Tour, but mainly the shows in the Earls Court in London. In 2012, it was re-released on The Wall "Immersion" Box-Set as an extra.

=== Waters tours and opera ===
Beginning in 2010, Waters performed the album worldwide on his tour, The Wall Live. These dates had a much wider wall, updated higher quality projected content and leading-edge projection technology. The tour included a one-off performance at The O2 Arena in London on 12 May 2011, which marked only the second time in 30 years that Gilmour, Waters, and Nick Mason played together, the last having been Live 8 in 2005. Gilmour played his guitar solo on top of the wall during Comfortably Numb, as he did on the original 1980/81 tour. A film of the live concert, Roger Waters: The Wall, was released in 2015.

In 2016, Waters adapted The Wall into an opera, Another Brick in the Wall: The Opera with contemporary classical composer Julien Bilodeau. It premiered at Opéra de Montréal in March 2017, and was produced by Cincinnati Opera in July 2018. It is orchestrated for a score of eight soloists, 48 chorus members, and a standard 70-piece operatic orchestra.

=== Tributes ===
In 2018, a tribute album The Wall [Redux] was released, with individual artists covering the entire album. This included Melvins' version of "In The Flesh?", Pallbearer covering "Run Like Hell", former Screaming Trees' singer Mark Lanegan covering "Nobody Home" and Church of the Cosmic Skull reworking "The Trial". On 19 September 2019, Channel Awesome's internet series, Nostalgia Critic, released a music video review of the album called Nostalgia Critic's The Wall, featuring Corey Taylor and Rob Scallon.

== Track listing ==
All tracks are written and sung by Roger Waters, except where noted.

Side one
No.	Title	Lead vocals	Length
1.	"In the Flesh?"		3:19
2.	"The Thin Ice"	Waters, David Gilmour	2:29
3.	"Another Brick in the Wall, Part 1"		3:09
4.	"The Happiest Days of Our Lives"		1:51
5.	"Another Brick in the Wall, Part 2"	Waters, Gilmour	3:59
6.	"Mother"	Waters, Gilmour	5:37
Total length:			20:11

Side two
No.	Title	Writer(s)	Lead vocals	Length
7.	"Goodbye Blue Sky"		Gilmour	2:47
8.	"Empty Spaces"			2:08
9.	"Young Lust"	Gilmour, Waters	Gilmour	3:29
10.	"One of My Turns"			3:37
11.	"Don't Leave Me Now"		Waters, Gilmour	4:16
12.	"Another Brick in the Wall, Part 3"			1:14
13.	"Goodbye Cruel World"			1:13
Total length:				18:43

Side three
No.	Title	Writer(s)	Lead vocals	Length
14.	"Hey You"		Gilmour, Waters	4:41
15.	"Is There Anybody Out There?"			2:39
16.	"Nobody Home"			3:24
17.	"Vera"			1:33
18.	"Bring the Boys Back Home"			1:27
19.	"Comfortably Numb"	Gilmour, Waters	Waters, Gilmour	6:23
Total length:				20:09

Side four
No.	Title	Writer(s)	Lead vocals	Length
20.	"The Show Must Go On"		Gilmour	1:36
21.	"In the Flesh"			4:16
22.	"Run Like Hell"	Gilmour, Waters		4:23
23.	"Waiting for the Worms"		Waters, Gilmour	3:57
24.	"Stop"			0:30
25.	"The Trial"	Bob Ezrin, Waters		5:19
26.	"Outside the Wall"			1:43
Total length:				21:39 80:42

== Personnel ==
Pink Floyd

- Roger Waters – vocals, bass guitar (1–6, 8, 10, 12, 13, 15, 19, 21), EMS VCS 3 (1, 7, 8, 11, 16, 21, 23), acoustic guitar (6, 17), electric guitar (12), sleeve design, co-production
- David Gilmour – vocals, electric guitar (1–6, 8–12, 14, 15, 19, 21–23, 25), acoustic guitar (6, 7, 14, 17, 19, 20), bass guitar (7, 9, 11, 14, 16, 17, 19, 20, 22, 23, 25), Prophet-5 (2, 7, 8, 19, 23) and ARP Quadra synthesisers (8, 21), co-production
- Nick Mason – drums (except 3, 6–8, 13, 15–18, 24, 26), percussion (10, 25)
- Richard Wright – Hammond organ (2, 4, 5, 9–11, 13, 14, 19, 23), Prophet-5 (1, 3–5, 7, 10–13, 15–17, 20, 22), piano (2, 8, 11, 25), ARP Quadra (14) and Minimoog synthesisers (3), Fender Rhodes (14) and Wurlitzer electric pianos (9), clavinet (4)

Additional musicians

- Bob Ezrin – co-producer, piano (6, 10, 16, 20, 23, 24), Hammond organ and harmonium (6), Prophet-5 (15, 20, 21), orchestral arrangement and music (25), backing vocals (23)
- James Guthrie – co-producer, engineer, percussion (4), ARP Quadra (8, 21), sound effects (14, 22)
- Michael Kamen – orchestral arrangement (15, 19)
- New York Orchestra – orchestra (16, 17, 18, 25)
- New York Opera – choral vocals (18)
- Fred Mandel – Hammond organ (1, 21)
- Jeff Porcaro – drums (6)
- Lee Ritenour – rhythm guitar (10), additional acoustic guitar (19)
- Joe (Ron) di Blasi – classical guitar (15)
- Joe Porcaro – snare drums (18)
- Bobbye Hall – congas and bongos (22)
- Frank Marocco – concertina (26)
- Larry Williams – clarinet (26)
- Trevor Veitch – mandolin (26)
- Bruce Johnston – backing vocals (1, 20, 21, 23)
- Toni Tennille – backing vocals (1, 20, 21, 23)
- Joe Chemay – backing vocals (1, 20, 21, 23)
- Jon Joyce – backing vocals (1, 20, 21, 23)
- Stan Farber – backing vocals (1, 20, 21, 23)
- Jim Haas – backing vocals (1, 20, 21, 23)
- Children of Islington Green School – vocals (5)
- Harry Waters – child's voice (7)
- Trudy Young – voice of the groupie (10)
- Vicki Brown and Clare Torry (credited simply as "Vicki & Clare") – backing vocals (25)
- Phil Taylor – sound effects (22)
- Chris Fitzmorris – male telephone voice (9)

Production

- Nick Griffiths – engineer
- Patrice Quef – engineer
- Brian Christian – engineer
- Rick Hart – engineer
- Doug Sax – mastering at The Mastering Lab
- John McClure – engineer
- Phil Taylor – sound equipment
- Gerald Scarfe – sleeve design
- Krieg Wunderlich – remastering on Mobile Fidelity Sound Lab 24kt gold CD
- Doug Sax, James Guthrie – 1994 remastering at The Mastering Lab
- James Guthrie, Joel Plante – 2011 remastering at das boot recording

== Charts ==
=== Weekly charts ===
Weekly chart performance for The Wall
Chart (1979–1980)	Peak position
Australian Albums (Kent Music Report)	1
Austrian Albums (Ö3 Austria)	1
Canada Top Albums/CDs (RPM)	1
Finnish Albums (Suomen Virallinen)	4
Dutch Albums (Album Top 100)	1
German Albums (Offizielle Top 100)	1
Italian Albums (Musica e Dischi)	1
New Zealand Albums (RMNZ)	1
Norwegian Albums (VG-lista)	1
Spanish Albums (AFE)	1
Swedish Albums (Sverigetopplistan)	1
UK Albums (Official Charts)	3
US Billboard 200	1
Chart (1990)	Peak position
Dutch Albums (Album Top 100)	19
Chart (2005–2006)	Peak position
Austrian Albums (Ö3 Austria)	11
Belgian Albums (Ultratop Flanders)	85
Belgian Albums (Ultratop Wallonia)	81
Danish Albums (Hitlisten)	19
Finnish Albums (Suomen virallinen lista)	21
Italian Albums (FIMI)	13
Spanish Albums (Promusicae)	9
Swiss Albums (Schweizer Hitparade)	29
Chart (2011–2023)	Peak position
Australian Albums (ARIA)	20
Austrian Albums (Ö3 Austria)	15
Belgian Albums (Ultratop Flanders)	44
Belgian Albums (Ultratop Wallonia)	20
Czech Albums (ČNS IFPI)	7
Danish Albums (Hitlisten)	10
Dutch Albums (Album Top 100)	15
Finnish Albums (Suomen virallinen lista)	17
French Albums (SNEP)	12
German Albums (Offizielle Top 100)	4
Hungarian Albums (MAHASZ)	15
Irish Albums (IRMA)	38
Italian Albums (FIMI)	4
New Zealand Albums (RMNZ)	14
Norwegian Albums (VG-lista)	10
Polish Albums (ZPAV)	8
Portuguese Albums (AFP)	6
Scottish Albums (Official Charts)	17
Slovenian Albums (IFPI)	6
Spanish Albums (Promusicae)	15
Swedish Albums (Sverigetopplistan)	13
Swiss Albums (Schweizer Hitparade)	8
UK Albums (Official Charts)	22
UK Rock & Metal Albums (Official Charts)	4
US Billboard 200	17
US Top Rock Albums (Billboard)	26

=== Year-end charts ===
Year-end chart performance for The Wall
Chart (1980)	Position
Austrian Albums (Ö3 Austria)	1
Canada Top Albums/CDs (RPM)	1
German Albums (Offizielle Top 100)	1
Italian Albums (Musica e dischi)	2
Spanish Albums (AFE)	2
New Zealand Albums (RMNZ)	1
US Billboard 200	1
Chart (2010)	Position
Italian Albums (FIMI)	91
Chart (2012)	Position
French Albums (SNEP)	157
Chart (2018)	Position
Portuguese Albums (AFP)	102
US Top Rock Albums (Billboard)	98
Chart (2019)	Position
Belgian Albums (Ultratop Wallonia)	190
US Top Rock Albums (Billboard)	62
Chart (2020)	Position
Belgian Albums (Ultratop Flanders)	195
Belgian Albums (Ultratop Wallonia)	195
Italian Albums (FIMI)	77
US Top Rock Albums (Billboard)	25
Chart (2021)	Position
Belgian Albums (Ultratop Flanders)	164
Italian Albums (FIMI)	81
US Top Rock Albums (Billboard)	39
Chart (2022)	Position
Polish Albums (ZPAV)	96
Portuguese Albums (AFP)	6
Chart (2024)	Position
Croatian International Albums (HDU)	40

Singles

Chart performance for singles from The Wall
Date	Single	Chart	Position	Source
23 November 1979	"Another Brick in the Wall (Part 2)"	UK Top 40	1	(Note: EMI Harvest HAR 5194 (7" single))
7 January 1980	"Another Brick in the Wall (Part 2)"	US Billboard Pop Singles	1	(Note: Columbia 1-11187 (7" single))
9 June 1980	"Run Like Hell"	US Billboard Pop Singles	53	(Note: Columbia 1-11265 (7" single))
March 1980	"Another Brick in the Wall (Part 2)"	Norway's single chart	1	

== Certifications and sales ==
Certifications and sales for The Wall
Region	Certification	Certified units/sales
Argentina (CAPIF)	Platinum	60,000^{^}
Australia (ARIA) DVD	11× Platinum	165,000^{^}
Australia (ARIA)	11× Platinum	800,000
Brazil	—	110,000
Brazil (Pro-Música Brasil) DVD	Platinum	50,000^{*}
Canada (Music Canada)	2× Diamond	2,000,000^{^}
Denmark (IFPI Danmark)	7× Platinum	140,000^{‡}
France (SNEP)	Diamond	1,000,000^{*}
France (SNEP) video	2× Platinum	40,000^{*}
Germany (BVMI)	4× Platinum	2,100,000
Germany (BVMI) video	2× Platinum	100,000^{^}
Greece (IFPI Greece)	Platinum	100,000^{^}
Hong Kong (IFPI Hong Kong)	Platinum	20,000^{*}
Italy (FIMI) sales of Parlophone edition since 2009	5× Platinum	250,000^{‡}
Italy (FIMI) sales of Harvest edition since 2009	Platinum	60,000^{*}
Italy DVD 2006 sales	—	15,000
Netherlands (NVPI) EMI Records Holland B.V. edition	Platinum	100,000^{^}
Netherlands (NVPI) Sony BMG edition	Gold	50,000^{^}
New Zealand (RMNZ)	14× Platinum	210,000^{^}
Poland (ZPAV) DVD	Platinum	10,000^{*}
Poland (ZPAV) 2011 release	2× Platinum	40,000^{‡}
Poland (ZPAV)	Platinum	70,000^{*}
Portugal (AFP)	Platinum	40,000^{^}
South Africa	—	60,000
Spain (Promusicae) 1979-1980 certification	Platinum	100,000^{^}
Spain (Promusicae) Reissue	Platinum	100,000^{^}
Switzerland (IFPI Switzerland)	2× Platinum	250,000
United Kingdom (BPI) 2011 reissue	3× Platinum	900,000^{‡}
United Kingdom (BPI) original release	Platinum	1,000,000
United Kingdom (BPI) video	5× Platinum	250,000^{*}
United States (RIAA) certified sales 1979–1999	23× Platinum	11,500,000^{^}
United States Nielsen sales 1991–2008	—	5,220,000
Summaries
Worldwide	—	30,000,000
^{*} Sales figures based on certification alone.^{^} Shipments figures based on certification alone.^{‡} Sales+streaming figures based on certification alone.

== See also ==
- List of best-selling albums
- List of best-selling albums in Australia
- List of best-selling albums in Canada
- List of best-selling albums in France
- List of best-selling albums in Germany
- List of best-selling albums in New Zealand
- List of best-selling albums in the United States
- List of diamond-certified albums in Canada
- List of 1970s albums considered the best
