= Bring the Boys Back Home =

Original song written and composed by Roger Waters

- Label to UK single release

Single by Pink Floyd

from the album The Wall
- A-side: "When the Tigers Broke Free"
- Released: 30 November 1979 (album version); 29 July 1982 (single version)
- Recorded: April–November 1979
- Genre: Military march; progressive rock
- Length: 1:21 (album version); 1:48 (single version)
- Label: Harvest (UK); Columbia (US)
- Songwriter: Roger Waters
- Producers: Bob Ezrin; David Gilmour; James Guthrie; Roger Waters

Official audio
- "Bring the Boys Back Home" on YouTube

"Bring the Boys Back Home" is a song by the English rock band Pink Floyd released on their eleventh studio album, The Wall (1979). The film version of the song was released as a B-side on the single, "When the Tigers Broke Free".

== Composition ==
As the final notes of the previous song "Vera" decay, the listener hears several snare drums articulating a march beat in 4/4 time, fading in like approaching soldiers. The song proves to be polyrhythmic, as this beat continues unchanged while the orchestra, choir, and lead vocals begin in 12/8.

Roger Waters sings the simple and direct lyric in his upper register, stridently, supported by a choir. A IV–V–I chord progression in G major repeats, providing a sense of satisfaction. This is followed by a reversal, from G to D major with F-sharp in the bass, to C major, which features a tritone movement in the bassline, going from F♯ to C, introducing a sense of instability. This progression is a recurring Pink Floyd theme, appearing throughout the album in "Hey You", "Vera", and others, as well as several songs on Waters and company's follow-up concept album on the losses of war, The Final Cut (1983). Waters and choir exhort, "Bring the boys back home / Don't leave the children on their own". On the final iteration, the song climaxes on the relative minor of E minor. The choir abruptly drops away, leaving Waters' voice alone, agonised and struggling to sustain the high note (the first B above middle C). A lone snare drum also remains, continuing its now-threatening march beat, as insane laughter and voices from Pink's past and present mingle while his manager pounds on his hotel-room door.

According to songwriter Roger Waters, "Bring the Boys Back Home" is the central, unifying song on The Wall:

... it's partly about not letting people go off and be killed in wars, but it's partly about not allowing rock and roll, or making cars, or selling soap, or getting involved in biological research, or anything that anybody might do ... not letting that become such an important and 'jolly boy's game' that it becomes more important than friends, wives, children, or other people.

— Roger Waters, Interview by Tommy Vance, broadcast 30 November 1979, BBC Radio 1

It is one of three songs on The Wall directly about the violence and consequences of armoured warfare pursued by armies of fanatics obedient to a despotic leader. The war is what results in Pink beginning to "build the wall" and marks a turning point ushering in the climatic portion of the album's narrative.

== Live performances ==
The original Pink Floyd concerts of The Wall were so expensive that, ultimately, the band lost money staging them. They were also, at that time, the most elaborate stage productions a rock band had ever mounted. For these reasons, and others, it is understandable that the band chose to use the original recordings of Michael Kamen's orchestral arrangements, rather than hire and rehearse a live orchestra, for what was then considered a rock and roll concert. Recordings of the original sound effects (televisions, helicopters, various atmospheric effects) were also used (as were the specific echo effects in several songs, such as "Hey You" or "Stop"). With the use of click tracks, the musicians were able to play in sync with the recordings (with the additional result that they reproduced nearly every song at its precise original tempo).

As "Bring the Boys Back Home" is performed by an orchestra, with a large number of drummers, and none of the typical rock and roll instruments, Roger Waters would simply sing along to a remix of the studio recording. This is demonstrated on Is There Anybody Out There? The Wall Live 1980–81 (2000), paying special attention to the ending, when the "live" Roger Waters drops out, and his recorded lead vocal remains, sustaining the last note with the unique wavering heard on the studio album.

Ten years later, when Roger Waters—by then a solo artist—decided to stage a massive re-production of The Wall at the site of the recently dismantled Berlin Wall, he had the personnel and the finances for a full-scale arrangement (particularly because it was understood to be a charity concert for the Memorial for Disaster Relief). Using the extended arrangement from the film, Waters sang (in his most strident, histrionic style) while backed by the Rundfunk Orchestra and Choir, band of the Combined Soviet Forces in Germany and the Red Army Chorus.

When Waters resurrected the concept of The Wall for his 2010–2012 tour, The Wall Live, the song was again central to the show's political message. Throughout the song, the projections on the fully built wall slowly gave a 1953 quote from the 34th president of the United States, Dwight D. Eisenhower:

Every gun that is made, every warship launched, every rocket fired, signifies, in the final sense, a theft from those who hunger and are not fed, those who are cold and not clothed.

== Film appearance ==
In the film, the song is sung by a large choir, without Waters' lead vocal. It is also expanded, with an extended vamp on the subdominant before repetition of the full four-line lyric.

"Bring the Boys Back Home" is about not letting war, or careers, overshadow family relationships or leave children neglected. This is symbolised in the film, in which the protagonist, Pink, is seen as a young boy at a railway station. The station is filled with soldiers returning from war, their loved ones happy to greet them. But though he wanders around in vain, there is no one for Pink to embrace, as his father did not make it home alive. The happy crowd then sings the song, but it ends abruptly on a minor chord as Pink suddenly realises he is alone, because the crowd of reunited families have vanished. As the last notes die away, we see his embittered and alienated adulthood. Memories of events that drove Pink to isolation begin to recur in a loop: The teacher from "Another Brick in the Wall", the operator from "What Shall We Do Now?", and the groupie from "One of My Turns", Pink's manager knocking and yelling out, "Time to go!" (to play a concert) and insane laughter are also mixed into the closing seconds, concluding with the ominous voice from "Is There Anybody Out There?", reverberating slowly into silence, and segueing into "Comfortably Numb" as Pink's manager bursts through the door finding Pink unconscious from an overdose.

== Personnel ==
Pink Floyd

- Roger Waters – vocals
- David Gilmour – vocals on the reprise of "Is There Anybody Out There?"

with:

- Joe Porcaro – snare drum
- 35 New York drummers including Bleu Ocean – snare drums
- New York Opera – choir
- New York Orchestra – strings

== See also ==
- List of anti-war songs
