= Waiting for the Worms =

Song by Pink Floyd

from the album The Wall
- Released: 30 November 1979
- Recorded: April–November 1979
- Genre: Progressive rock; art rock; hard rock
- Length: 3:58
- Label: Harvest (UK); Columbia (US)
- Songwriter: Roger Waters
- Producers: Bob Ezrin; David Gilmour; James Guthrie; Roger Waters

Official audio
- "Waiting for the Worms" on YouTube

"Waiting for the Worms" (working title "Follow the Worms") is a song by the English rock band Pink Floyd, released on their eleventh studio album The Wall (1979). It is preceded by "Run Like Hell" and followed by "Stop".

== Composition and plot ==
At this point in the album, protagonist Pink has lost hope ("You cannot reach me now") and his thinking has decayed ("no matter how you try"), telling his listeners to "walk on by" before the song takes a more aggressive turn. In his hallucination, he is a fascist dictator, fomenting racist outrage and violence, as begun in the preceding song, "Run Like Hell". The count-in is Eins, zwei, drei, alle —German for "one, two, three, all". The song is a slow, leaden march in G Major, begun with David Gilmour and Roger Waters alternating calm and strident voices, respectively. Waters takes over with an extended vamp on A minor, musically similar to the album's earlier "The Happiest Days of Our Lives". Through a megaphone, he barks forceful invectives ("Waiting to put on a black shirt ... for the queers and the coons and the Reds and the Jews"). After an extended rant, Gilmour's calmer voice returns, with the promise that his followers will "see Britannia rule again" and "send our coloured cousins home again," with Waters, in a conversely more aggressive tone, concluding "All you need to do is follow the worms!"

Finally, the song changes into a minor-key musical theme: root, major second, minor third, major second—that has recurred throughout the album, as the main theme to "Another Brick in the Wall", the instrumental section of "Hey You", and will be heard in the album's climax, "The Trial". The riff is repeated in E minor, with E minor and D Major chords played atop it on keyboards. From the megaphone, Pink's rant lapses into incomprehensibility, while the music and the crowd's chanting "hammer" grows louder during the film animation of marching hammer jackboots. Finally, the song abruptly halts with a shout of "Stop!"

== Film version ==
The imagery features a live action segment with some teenagers (the same ones from "In the Flesh?") trampling over a rag doll replica of Pink. He then shouts through a megaphone while his followers march through the street. Following the images of the fascist crowd, the screaming face and the fascist bashing a man's skull from "What Shall We Do Now?", a dog biting meat off a hook then consumed by a larger one (from the In the Flesh tour), and the famous goose-stepping hammer sequence, Pink is seen yelling "Stop".

== Concerts ==
In the concerts of The Wall, a member of Pink Floyd, often Waters, would wear a leather trench coat. Gilmour would provide the high pitched "Ooooh, you cannot reach me now, ooooooh!" The song would build up until the lights extinguish in preparation to introduce the "Pink puppet" that sings "Stop". The marching hammers animation would be displayed on a circular screen above the stage, and across the wall during concerts.

Later concerts, performed by Waters after his departure from the band, featured a similar scene. Backing singers provided Gilmour's lines, and, in the 2010–2013 tour of The Wall, ending with the marching hammers filling the entire wall.

=== Animation ===
The full, uncut animation shown at the concert begins with a cartoon image of a hill. On top of the hill are indistinct objects, moving. Suddenly, as the guitar leitmotif plays briefly, the sky goes dark grey, a symbol of evil. The scene scrolls down to reveal London being enveloped in darkness as "Would you like to see..." and the rest of the verse is sung. Then, an abandoned tricycle is shown, as "Would you like to send..." and the rest of that verse is sung. An abandoned playground is shown as the final verse is sung. Then a viaduct appears, where something is goose-stepping. At long last it is revealed that the objects on the hill, what possibly scared the children and what was under the viaduct, are marching hammers. As the fascist dictator shows increasing desperation, louder and angrier, there is a whip pan in to the hammers, and as the camera pans there is a sudden, loud, abrupt instrumental sound, which is quickly replaced by a piano. The animation stops, as the song "Stop" begins.

== Reaction ==
- Jorge Sacido Romero and Luis Miguel Varela Cabo opined that "Waiting for the Worms" represented Waters' fears of a "potential ideological drift towards an ultranationalist, imperialist and racist stand that calls for the resurrection of a Britannia that is both pure and almighty."
- In 2010, the Dublin band Twinkranes covered the song for a Mojo magazine tribute album.

== Personnel ==
Pink Floyd

- Roger Waters – EMS VCS 3; lead and backing vocals; megaphone vocals
- David Gilmour – lead vocals; backing vocals (intro); laughter; guitars; bass guitar; Prophet-5 synthesiser
- Nick Mason – drums
- Richard Wright – organ, backing vocals

Additional musicians

- Bob Ezrin – piano; backing vocals
- Bruce Johnston – backing vocals
- Toni Tennille – backing vocals
- Joe Chemay – backing vocals
- Stan Farber – backing vocals
- Jim Haas – backing vocals
- John Joyce – backing vocals
