= Is There Anybody Out There? =

Song by Pink Floyd

from the album The Wall
- Released: 30 November 1979
- Recorded: April–November 1979
- Genre: Progressive rock; psychedelic folk
- Length: 2:44
- Label: Harvest (UK); Columbia (US)
- Songwriter: Roger Waters
- Producers: Bob Ezrin; David Gilmour; James Guthrie; Roger Waters

"Is There Anybody Out There?" is a song from the eleventh Pink Floyd album, The Wall. It is largely an instrumental, containing few lyrics and mainly consists of a classical guitar solo.

== Music ==
The first half of the piece has the same concept of "Hey You", being a distress call from Pink. Musically, it's a droning bass synthesizer with various sound effects layered on top, and a repeating chorus of "Is there anybody out there?". The shrill siren-like sound effect used during this song is also used in an earlier Pink Floyd work, "Echoes". The noise is mimicking a seagull cry. The seagull noise was created by David Gilmour using a wah-wah pedal with the guitar and output leads plugged in the wrong way round.

The second half of the song is a classical guitar solo. In interviews, David Gilmour has said that he tried to perform it, and was not satisfied with the final result ("I could play it with a leather pick but couldn't play it properly fingerstyle"). Accordingly, session musician Joe DiBlasi was brought in. He is wrongly credited as "Ron DiBlasi" on the Pink Floyd website.

== Premise ==
The Wall tells the story of Pink, an alienated young rock star who is retreating from society and isolating himself. At this point, a bitter and alienated Pink is attempting to reach anybody outside of his self-built wall. The repeated question "Is there anybody out there?" suggests that no response is heard.

On the other hand, "Comfortably Numb" starts with the sentence "Hello, Is there anybody in there?", addressed to Pink.

== Film version ==
In the film Pink Floyd – The Wall, during the ominous opening to the song, Pink is standing in front of the completed wall, and throws himself against it several times as if trying to escape. Then, during the acoustic guitar section, it cuts to Pink laying out all his possessions on the floor of the hotel room in neat piles. At the end of the song, it cuts to the bathroom where Pink shaves off his eyebrows and body hair, unintentionally cutting himself as he shaves off his body hair (including around his nipples), then later cutting himself almost deliberately as he shaves off his eyebrows.

== TV excerpts ==
There are two excerpts from the TV programmes Gunsmoke and Gomer Pyle, U.S.M.C. overlaid in the background of the track.

The Gunsmoke excerpt is from the episode entitled "Fandango" (first aired: 11 February 1967); Dialog starts at 32:54 of the show; the dialogue is as follows:

Marshal Dillon: Well, we got only about an hour of daylight left. We better get started.
Miss Tyson: Is it unsafe to travel at night?
Marshal Dillon: It'll be a lot less safe to stay here. Your father's gonna pick up our trail before long.
Miss Tyson: Can Lorca ride?
Marshal Dillon: He'll have to ride. Lorca, time to go! Chengra, thank you for everything. Let's go.
Miss Tyson: Goodbye, Chengra!
Chengra: Goodbye, Missy!
Miss Tyson: I'll be back — one day.
Chengra: The bones have told Chengra.
Miss Tyson: Take care of yourself.
Chengra: Marshal, look after my Missy.

The Gomer Pyle, U.S.M.C. excerpt is from the episode entitled "Gomer Says 'Hey' to the President" (first aired: 20 October 1967); Dialog starts at 1:45 of the show; the dialogue is as follows:

Sgt. Carter: All right, I'll take care of him part of the time.
(This is where the next song in the album, "Nobody Home" starts.)
Sgt. Carter: But there's somebody else that needs taking care of in Washington.
Cpl. Chuck Boyle: Who's that?
Sgt. Carter: Rose Pilchek.
Cpl. Chuck Boyle: Rose Pilchek? Who's that?
Sgt. Carter: 36-24-36. Does that answer your question?
Cpl. Chuck Boyle: Yeah, but you still didn't tell me, who is she?
Sgt. Carter: She was Miss Armoured Division of 1961. And she was still growing.
Cpl. Chuck Boyle: I get the picture.
Sgt. Carter: She's a waitress now; she dropped out of nursing school.
Cpl. Chuck Boyle: Well how'd you get to meet her?

== Personnel ==
- David Gilmour – whale/seagull sound (electric guitar and wah-wah pedal), backing vocals
- Roger Waters – lead vocals, bass guitar
- Richard Wright – Prophet-5 synthesiser

with:

- Bob Ezrin – synthesiser, string synth
- Joe DiBlasi – classical guitar
- Michael Kamen – orchestral arrangement

Personnel per Fitch and Mahon.

== Versions ==
- An alternate version appears in the film Pink Floyd – The Wall
- The Oliver Hart song "Ode to the Wall", from The Many Faces of Oliver Hart, samples this song extensively.
- The Zac Brown Band song "Junkyard", from Jekyll + Hyde, samples the song extensively.
