= Church of the Cosmic Skull =

British rock band

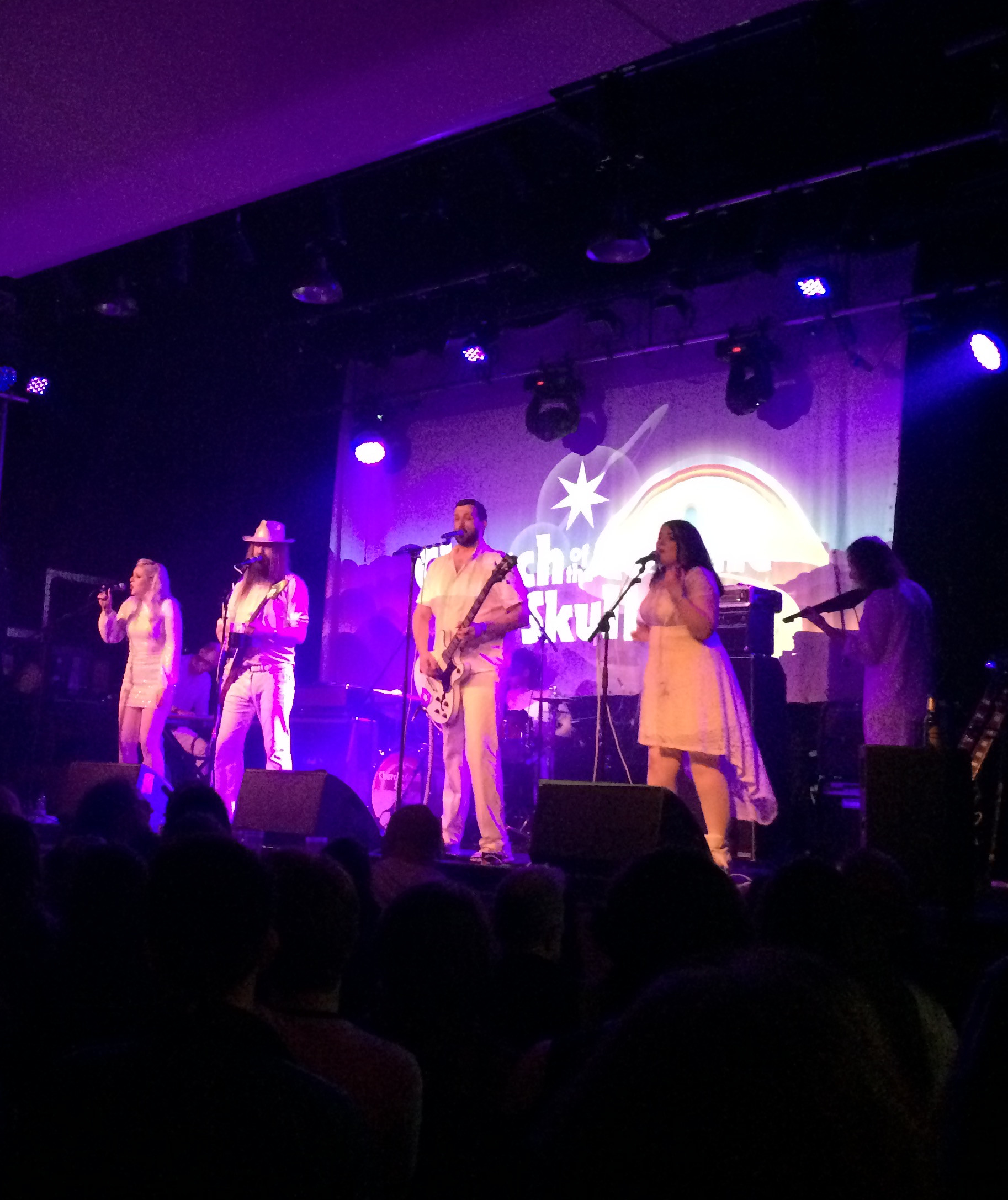
- Church of the Cosmic Skull live in London, 2020

Background information
- Genres: Progressive rock; arena rock
- Years active: 2016-present
- Labels: Kozmik-Artifactz
- Members: Bill Fisher; Joanne Joyce; Caroline Cawley; Michael Wetherburn; Joe Stone; Sam Lloyd; Laurence Stone
- Past members: Amy Nicholson
- Website: www.cosmicskull.org

Church of the Cosmic Skull are a British rock band from Nottingham.

== Career ==
The group was formed by guitarist, singer and songwriter Bill Fisher in 2016. The group members had previously played in various bands in and around Nottingham, and a number of early songs had been written years before while in other bands. Fisher was interested in progressive pop as much as progressive rock, and wanted the band to be primarily about good songwriting rather than technical expertise. His influences include Queen, The Beatles, Thin Lizzy, Kate Bush, David Bowie and Peter Gabriel. The instrumentation makes prominent use of the Hammond organ, piano and strings, and multiple vocal harmonies.

The band released "Evil in your Eye" from their first album Is Satan Real? on 21 August 2017 to celebrate the solar eclipse on the same day, celebrating the "hallucinatory nature of reality". They have also covered Pink Floyd's "The Trial" on Magnetic Eye Records' tribute album The Wall Redux.

The band released their first album with Bilocation Records, the second with Kozmik Artifactz, and the third on their own label, Septaphonic Records. While major record labels have shown interest, the band prefers to release material and promote themselves independently. They are known for their white on-stage attire and their rainbow-themed album artwork. Fisher has described the group as a "twofold entity: a new religious movement ... and a 7-piece supergroup" and believes that music can make people appreciate each other and avoid political propaganda.

Their 2019 album Everybody's Going To Die covered themes such as the cult of personality, wanting fame, echo chambers on social media, and death. It received positive reviews, with Mojo saying "Fans of Queen and Queens of the Stone Age will nod sagely", and Jonathan Ross adding that he was "Enjoying this new band’s take on prog".

In 2022, the band announced that they would be playing in a Nottingham music festival, Beat The Streets.

== Personnel ==
- Bill Fisher - guitar, vocals
- Joanne Joyce - vocals
- Caroline Cawley - vocals
- Michael Wetherburn - keyboards, vocals
- Martyn Fisher - guitar
- Sam Lloyd - bass
- Laurence Stone - drums

Former members:

- Amy Nicholson - cello, vocals
- Joe Stone - electric viola

== Discography ==
- Is Satan Real? (2016)
- Science Fiction (2018)
- Everybody's Going To Die (2019)
- There Is No Time (2022)
