= The Thin Ice =

Song by Pink Floyd

from the album The Wall
- Released: 30 November 1979
- Recorded: April – November 1979
- Genre: Progressive rock; hard rock
- Length: 2:30
- Label: Harvest (UK); Columbia (US)
- Songwriter: Roger Waters
- Producers: Bob Ezrin; David Gilmour; James Guthrie; Roger Waters

Official audio
- "The Thin Ice" on YouTube

"The Thin Ice" is a song by the English rock band Pink Floyd. It is the second track on their eleventh studio album, The Wall (1979).

== Composition ==
The song, which is two minutes and 30 seconds in length, begins with the sound of an infant crying. The main body of the song is a '50s progression, with time signature in 6/8, commonly heard in doo-wop songs such as Ben E. King's "Stand by Me", progressing from C Major to A minor, then F Major to G Major, played softly on piano and synthesiser. The first half of the lyrics are sung by David Gilmour in a gentle tone, beginning with "Mama loves her baby", and a refrain of "Ooh babe, ooh, baby blue". A bass guitar creates a dissonant effect mid-song, when it plays an F♯ against an A minor, the major sixth of the chord, and the augmented fourth of the key. Then Roger Waters takes over the lead vocal. The piano becomes staccato, as the lyric takes on a warning tone, with Waters singing "If you should go skating/On the thin ice of modern life...."

As the lyrics end, the diatonic sense of C Major is abandoned, as the melody heard earlier (E, D, F, E, and A) becomes stripped to a simple power chord riff, played loud by distorted guitars, with brief soloing. The song ends on a sustained C Major chord, but through crossfading with the next song on the album, "Another Brick in the Wall, Part 1", a D minor chord is interpolated, contributing to uneasiness intimated by the lyrics.

== Plot ==
The Wall is the story of Pink, who grows up to become an alienated and embittered rock star, with a failing marriage and feelings of megalomania. "The Thin Ice" can be seen as the introduction to his story, since the previous song, the album's opening track "In The Flesh?" is chronologically placed later in the album's narrative, and then the story is begun via flashback. "The Thin Ice" introduces Pink as a baby and young child, and while the lyrics assure the listener that "Mama loves her baby, and Daddy loves you, too", it warns that "[T]he sea may look warm... the sky may look blue", but "Don't be surprised when a crack in the ice/Appears under your feet".

== Film version ==
The film shows hundreds of soldiers in the Second World War, either wounded or dead, then cuts to Pink floating in his hotel pool. As shown later in the film (in the segment for "One of My Turns"), Pink has cut his hand, and the amount of blood in the water is exaggerated, until he appears to be floating in a pool of blood.

The film version has an extended piano intro that plays before Gilmour's vocal.

== Personnel ==
Pink Floyd

- David Gilmour – vocals (first verse), guitars, Prophet-5 synthesiser
- Nick Mason – drums
- Roger Waters – vocals (second verse), bass guitar
- Richard Wright – piano, Hammond organ

Personnel per Fitch and Mahon.
