= Hey You (Pink Floyd song) =

Single by Pink Floyd

from the album The Wall
- A-side: "Comfortably Numb"
- Released: 30 November 1979
- Recorded: April–November 1979
- Genre: Progressive rock; hard rock
- Length: 4:40
- Label: Harvest (UK); Columbia (US)
- Songwriter: Roger Waters
- Producers: Bob Ezrin; David Gilmour; James Guthrie; Roger Waters

Official audio
- "Hey You" on YouTube

"Hey You" is a song by the English rock band Pink Floyd, released on their eleventh studio album The Wall (1979). It also appeared as the B-side to the "Comfortably Numb" single in June 1980. The song, along with "The Show Must Go On", was edited out of Pink Floyd – The Wall (1982) to prevent the film from running too long; however, a rough version is available as an extra on the 25th Anniversary Edition DVD of The Wall.

== Composition ==
The song starts off with an acoustic guitar, restrung in a fashion similar to Nashville tuning, but with the low E string replaced by a high E tuned two full octaves higher than normal. It plays arpeggios over E and D minor added ninth chords. The alternate stringing allows for adjacent pitches (such as the E, F♯, and G of the Em9 chord) to ring out separately on separate strings throughout the arpeggio. A fretless bass enters, also played by guitarist David Gilmour rather than usual bassist Roger Waters. Next to join in is the Fender Rhodes electric piano by Richard Wright, Gilmour's vocals, singing in the first person as the character "Pink" ("Can you feel me?"), and overdubbed acoustic guitar and drums at the start of the second verse. In the middle is a guitar solo underscored by an overdriven Hammond organ which is played over the album's leitmotif of the melody to "Another Brick in the Wall" (in E minor and A minor, rather than D minor). After the solo, Roger Waters sings the lead vocal for the rest of the song, in a narrative role, referring to "Pink" in the third person ("No matter how he tried") and then as Pink ("don't tell me there's no hope at all"). The bridge is a chord sequence later heard on the album as "Bring the Boys Back Home", ending on an E minor chord, leading to a reprise of the instrumental introduction, augmented by prominent ARP Quadra riffs. At this point, there is a piece of indecipherable whispering from the left channel. Drums and vocals then join in. At about 3:23 into the song, a sonar-like sound, similar to the ping in "Echoes", is heard. After the lyrics, "And the worms ate into his brain", the album's chief audio engineer, James Guthrie created the worm-eating sound effect by using the faintly audible sound of a hand-held power drill boring into an undefined material. When Waters sings the final verse, he does so one octave higher than Gilmour, with the highest note being the first C above middle C.

== Plot ==
The Wall tells the story of Pink, an alienated young rock star who is retreating from society and isolating himself. In "Hey You", Pink realizes his mistake of shunning society and attempts to regain contact with the outside world. However, he cannot see or hear beyond the wall. Pink's call becomes more and more desperate as he begins to realize there is no escape.

=== Film version ===
"Hey You" was shot for the film Pink Floyd – The Wall (1982), but the sequence (also known as Reel 13) was ultimately not included. A workprint appears on the special edition DVD, in black and white. Most of the footage was used in other sequences (most notably "Another Brick in the Wall, Part 3").

The scene begins with Pink trying to claw out of his freshly completed wall. The scene then switches to Pink's concert-goers, all of them with a blank and vacant look on their faces. These are the people "Standing in the aisles with itchy feet and fading smiles" that Pink is trying to reach out to. Next is a shot of empty infirmary beds followed by a view of two empty chairs in a white room. A motionless Pink fades into the chair on the left, with his nude wife fading into the right chair a short time later. After turning her head to look at her unresponsive husband, she fades out of the scene, which shifts to a montage of rioting scenes, with people tipping over cars and throwing Molotov cocktails at riot police. After the montage, a hand is shown clawing at a window (the colour version of this is actually shown at the end of "The Trial") followed by a large group of maggots (the "worms" eating into Pink's brain). After a shot of Pink in an infirmary bed and his screaming wife superimposed over the image, the scene takes back to the riot, where a long line of police officers hold back a mob of rioters who have barricaded themselves behind a pile of desks and mattresses. The scene ends with Pink against his wall, having given up on finding a way out.

== Personnel ==
Pink Floyd

- Roger Waters – lead vocals (bridge and last verse)
- David Gilmour – lead vocals (first and second verse), harmony vocals, high strung 6-string acoustic guitar and 12-string acoustic guitars, electric guitars, pedal steel, fretless bass
- Richard Wright – Fender Rhodes electric piano, Hammond organ, ARP Quadra synthesiser
- Nick Mason – drums

with:

- James Guthrie – hand-held power drill

Personnel per Fitch and Mahon.

== Certifications ==
Region	Certification	Certified units/sales
Italy (FIMI)	Gold	25,000^{‡}
New Zealand (RMNZ)	Platinum	30,000^{‡}
United Kingdom (BPI)	Silver	200,000^{‡}
^{‡} Sales+streaming figures based on certification alone.

== Bibliography ==
- Fitch, Vernon (2005). The Pink Floyd Encyclopedia (3rd ed.). Apogee Books. ISBN 1-894959-24-8.
- Fitch, Vernon; Mahon, Richard (2006-07-28). Comfortably Numb — A History of The Wall 1978–1981. PFA Publishing. ISBN 978-0-9777366-0-7.
