= In the Flesh?/In the Flesh =

"In the Flesh?"

Song by Pink Floyd

from the album The Wall
- Released: 30 November 1979
- Recorded: January – November 1979
- Genre: Hard rock; heavy metal; progressive rock
- Length: 3:18 ("In the Flesh?"); 4:15 ("In the Flesh")
- Label: Harvest (UK); Columbia (US)
- Songwriter: Roger Waters
- Producers: Bob Ezrin; David Gilmour; James Guthrie; Roger Waters

"In the Flesh?" and "In the Flesh" are two songs by the English rock band Pink Floyd, released on their eleventh studio album, The Wall (1979). "In the Flesh?" is the opening track, and introduces the story concept of the album. "In the Flesh" is the twenty-first song of the album, and is a reprise of the first with a choir, different verses and more extended instrumentation.

The title is a reference to the band's 1977 In the Flesh Tour, during which Roger Waters, in frustration, spat at a fan who was attempting to climb the fence separating the band from the crowd.

== Composition ==
The majority of the songs are in the key of A major and its time signature is 6/8. The arrangement is dynamic and dramatic. The first few seconds of the first song ("In the Flesh?") are quiet, and feature the melody of the song "Outside the Wall", which is the album's closing track. The recording begins abruptly as a man speaks the phrase "...we came in?" completing the sentence cut off at the end of the album as the man says "Isn't this where..." This link is similar to the way The Dark Side of the Moon (1973) opens and closes with the sound of a heartbeat.

The quiet melody of "Outside the Wall" is interrupted in mid-phrase, as the main body of the song starts loudly, with a succession of power chords on organ and distorted guitars. A low-pitched melody begins at a slow pace with rapid snare drum fills. This is where the album's leitmotif is first heard, with a pattern of D-E-F-E in the guitars. The introduction lasts for more than a minute before the singing starts, and the tone shifts to gentle keyboards and male doo-wop harmony in the background. Following the lyrics, the loud guitar melody returns. During this outro, Roger Waters shouts out stage directions, and a Stuka dive bomber and ground-attack aircraft can be heard. The final sound of the first track is that of a baby crying, which leads into "The Thin Ice", the second track in the album.

The reprise ("In the Flesh") begins the same explosive organ sequence heard in the first song. The song then moves into a slightly quieter choir chorus, before the lyrical section. The end of the song features another organ sequence, and the song fades out to the chanting of "Pink! Floyd! Pink! Floyd!".

Waters said the main chord sequence and melody were not initially part of The Wall, but were borrowed from The Pros and Cons of Hitch Hiking (1984), which was written by Waters at the same time as The Wall and later became his debut solo studio album.

== Plot ==
"In the Flesh?" introduces the story of Pink, a rock star. It begins with the opening of a rock concert. The lyrics inform the listener that, despite his outward appearances, things are much different "behind these cold eyes" and that if the listener wants to know what is truly happening with Pink, they will, lyrically, just have to claw their way through this disguise. The song also subtly indicates that Pink's father was killed in a war, with the sound effect of a dive-bomber. Finally, a baby is heard crying, indicating that Pink and his mother are left without a father and husband, respectively (this is expanded upon two songs later, in "Another Brick in the Wall, Part 1").

Later in the album, the reprise marks the first of a series of songs in which Pink, in a drug-induced hallucination, believes himself to be a fascist dictator, crowing over his faithful audience; this particular song is his hallucination that his concerts can be likened to a political rally. He begins exhorting his fans to show their devotion to him by throwing undesirables such as "queers", Jews, and "coons"; "up against the wall". He punctuates the end of the song with "If I had my way I'd have all of you shot!". The incited crowd then chant "Pink! Floyd! Pink! Floyd!" as the song segues into "Run Like Hell".

== Live performances ==
During the original tour supporting The Wall, the song would be performed onstage by the backing musicians wearing masks to make them look like the real members of Pink Floyd, playing on the lines "Tell me, is something eluding you sunshine? Is this not what you expected to see? You'll just have to claw your way through this disguise", as well as the references to a "surrogate band" in the song's reprise later on.

In Waters' 2010–13 tour of the album, The Wall Live, he performed the song himself, in the guise of the megalomaniacal dictator that his character Pink becomes at the climax of the show.

Waters has also regularly performed the song on his other solo tours, with it featuring in the set for his The Pros and Cons of Hitch Hiking, Radio K.A.O.S., In the Flesh, The Dark Side of the Moon Live, and This Is Not a Drill tours.

In May 2023, Waters' portrayal of the song drew backlash when he donned the dictator persona and costume at a concert in Berlin on the This Is Not a Drill tour. German authorities began investigating Waters for the performance, as Germany has strict laws against incitement to racial hatred. Nazi symbolism is banned in Germany, with exemptions for educational and artistic purposes.

== Film version ==
The beginning of the film shows Pink sitting in a locked hotel room. A housekeeper knocks repeatedly, then uses her keys to let herself in. While this happens, Pink's mind flashes back to a concert, in which a massive crowd of eager concertgoers manages to break down a chained door to the concert venue and rush inside, trampling each other in the process. The film shows quick cuts of rioting fans and a violent police response, interspersed with scenes of soldiers being bombed in the fields of war. A Nazi German Ju 87 Stuka bombs a bunker, in which Pink's father is killed.

The song is performed by Pink (Bob Geldof) in his dictator garb, with the set decorated like a Nazi rally, an insignia of two crossed hammers replacing the swastika. Geldof recorded his own vocals over the original Pink Floyd music track, replacing Waters' vocals.

The film version also uses a mix in which the song's intro was longer, with the E minor power chord riff, and a short David Gilmour solo, repeating twice. This was edited out of the record due to time constraints, however this full length intro has been included in every live performance, except for a heavily abridged instrumental version performed by Waters at the Live Earth concert in 2007.

Later in the film, the reprise is used in a similar way as in the album, picking up shortly after Pink's transformation into a dictator. The song is one of the most radically changed among film versions, having been converted to an orchestral piece. The dictator questions the loyalty of the fans, while setting his dogs against the "queers" and "coons" he singles out. As the song ends, the crowd's chant of "Pink Floyd!" is replaced with "Hammer", invoking the film motif of hammers. In addition, both Pink and the crowd display the "Hammer" salute, arms crossed in front of the chest at the wrists like a pair of crossed hammers. In addition, the "Crossed Hammer" logo can be seen everywhere. The song immediately segues into "Run Like Hell".

== Personnel ==
Personnel according to Fitch and Mehon in A History of The Wall.

=== "In the Flesh?" ===
- Roger Waters – lead vocals, bass guitar, EMS VCS 3
- David Gilmour – guitars
- Richard Wright – Prophet-5 synthesiser
- Nick Mason – drums

Additional musicians

- Fred Mandel – Hammond organ
- Bruce Johnston – backing vocals
- Toni Tennille – backing vocals
- Joe Chemay – backing vocals
- Stan Farber – backing vocals
- Jim Haas – backing vocals
- Jon Joyce – backing vocals

=== "In the Flesh" ===
- David Gilmour – ARP Quadra, guitars
- Nick Mason – drums
- Roger Waters – lead vocals, bass guitar, EMS VCS 3
- Richard Wright – backing vocals

Additional musicians

- James Guthrie – ARP Quadra
- Fred Mandel – organ
- Bob Ezrin – Prophet-5
- Bruce Johnston – backing vocals
- Toni Tennille – backing vocals
- Joe Chemay – backing vocals
- Stan Farber – backing vocals
- Jim Haas – backing vocals
- Jon Joyce – backing vocals

== Cover versions ==
- "In the Flesh?" is incorporated in the beginning of "The Big Medley" by Dream Theater, from their first EP A Change of Seasons (1995).
- The Dresden Dolls played it live during their 2007/08 tour.
- Primus has covered the song throughout their career.
- Type O Negative have frequently played it live, using it to open some of their live concerts, notably seen on their DVD Symphony for the Devil (2006).
- Jane's Addiction occasionally plays an instrumental version of the first half of the song.
- The Foo Fighters covered the song frequently on their Wasting Light tour. They also played the song live with Waters on Late Night with Jimmy Fallon.
- Scorpions performed this song in Roger Waters' The Wall – Live in Berlin. The first part was performed solely by the band (with Klaus Meine on lead vocals), then was performed with Roger Waters in the reprise.
- Country Teasers incorporated elements of "In the Flesh (Reprise)" into "Spiderman in the Flesh" on their fifth studio album The Empire Strikes Back (2006).

== Certifications ==
Certifications for In the Flesh?
Region	Certification	Certified units/sales
New Zealand (RMNZ)	Gold	15,000^{‡}
^{‡} Sales+streaming figures based on certification alone.
