= The Trial (song) =

Song by Pink Floyd

from the album The Wall
- Released: 30 November 1979
- Recorded: April – November 1979
- Genre: Symphonic rock; art rock; hard rock; progressive rock
- Length: 5:13
- Label: Harvest (UK); Columbia (US)
- Songwriters: Roger Waters; Bob Ezrin
- Producers: Bob Ezrin; David Gilmour; James Guthrie; Roger Waters

"The Trial" (working title "Trial by Puppet") is a track from Pink Floyd's 1979 rock opera/concept album The Wall. Written by Roger Waters and Bob Ezrin, it marks the climax of the album and film.

== Plot ==
The song centres on the main character, Pink (based on Roger Waters), who having lived a life filled with emotional trauma and substance abuse has reached a critical psychological break. "The Trial" is the fulcrum on which Pink's mental state balances. In the song, Pink is charged with "showing feelings of an almost human nature." This means that Pink has committed a crime against himself by attempting to interact with his fellow human beings, defying the mission towards self-isolation that defined much of his life. Through the course of the song, he is confronted by the primary influences of his life (who have been introduced over the course of the album): an abusive schoolmaster, his wife, and his overprotective mother; in the animated sequence, they are depicted as grotesque caricatures. Pink's subconscious struggle for sanity is overseen by a new character, "The Judge." In Pink Floyd -- The Wall and the concert animations, the Judge is a giant worm for most of the song until this verse, at which point he transforms into a giant anthropomorphic body from the waist-down (bigger than the marching hammers in "Waiting for the Worms"), his face constructed from various elements of the buttocks and genitals. A prosecutor conducts the early portions, which consist of the antagonists explaining their actions, intercut with Pink's refrains "Crazy/Toys in the attic, I am crazy/Truly gone fishing" and "Crazy/Over the rainbow, I am crazy/Bars in the window". The culmination of the trial is the judge's sentence for Pink "to be exposed before [his] peers" whereupon he orders Pink to "Tear down the wall!"

As Waters sings the dialogue for each character, he transitions into different accents, including a Cockney accent (the prosecutor and judge), a Scottish accent (the schoolmaster) and a Northern English accent (Pink's mother). For the character of Pink's wife, he used his normal voice on the album and in the original 1980-81 tour. However, in his solo 2010-13 tour of The Wall, he portrays the wife with a distinctively French accent.

This and the following song, "Outside the Wall", are the only two songs on the album during which the story is (partly) seen from an outsider's perspective, most notably through the three antagonists of "The Trial," even though it is all in Pink's mind. The song ends with the sound of a wall being demolished, amid chants of "Tear down the wall!", marking the destruction of Pink's metaphorical wall.

== Film version ==
The segment in the film version is a full-length animated sequence of vivid colour and disturbing visuals; the animation was originally used for the album's concert performances, before being reworked for the film adaptation. Political cartoonist Gerald Scarfe directed the design for the segment. The film segment relies not only on visuals, but also on the themes, music, and lyrics of the original song. Pink is portrayed as an almost inanimate rag doll throughout the sequence. Pink's schoolmaster, wife and mother and the prosecutor and judge are depicted as large and grotesque caricatures and are known individually by their role:

- The prosecutor is a caricature of a Victorian barrister. He is short and rotund, wearing a long navy gown which trails behind him, at points above his own head, such as when he leaps onto the wall (depicted as being composed of white bricks, as in the album's cover). His facial features are occasionally greatly exaggerated; depending on what he is saying. For instance, when he describes Pink's charges, while saying that Pink has experienced "feelings of an almost human nature", his face moves close to the camera and assumes a grotesque expression of disgust and contempt.
- The schoolmaster is brought down like a marionette on strings, controlled by his overbearing wife, referring to the earlier song "The Happiest Days of Our Lives". He has a long face with grey skin and two pointy tufts of hair on top, making his head somewhat resemble a hammer, which he morphs into during the line, "Let me hammer him today."
- The wife comes out from underneath the wall, initially represented as the scorpion/praying mantis that previously appeared during "Don't Leave Me Now", before turning into a naked woman with flaming hair.
- The mother comes in as an abstract, morphing image of an airplane (referencing the plane which killed Pink's father, and also the plane which Pink was playing with in "Another Brick in the Wall (Part I)"), and then transforms into a talking vagina, which then encircles Pink before morphing into a caricature of the archetypal mid-20th century British mother. As her verse ends, she transforms into the wall that Pink continues to be trapped behind.
- The judge is initially portrayed as a large worm, before transforming into a giant pair of buttocks — complete with two backwards facing legs, an anus for a mouth (with a monstrous voice), and a scrotum for a chin — wearing a judge's wig.

The judge reaches the final verdict to tear down the wall, and vomits out a montage of clips from the movie; following this is a long moment of silence before the wall begins to burst apart, accompanied by a scream of agony and terror from Pink.

Before the film, the animated sequence was first used in the 1980/81 concert versions of The Wall with Waters singing the song in front of The Wall as "The Trial"'s animation played behind him on the wall. It was then used again in the 2010-13 touring concert version, albeit with the "crazy" interludes modified to incorporate CGI (most prominently the replacement of the floating leaf sequence with one of a deformed humanoid lashing out towards the audience, surrounded by graffiti of hateful messages).

There are also a number of differences on the 1980/81 Live version of the animation compared to the 1982 movie. Several scenes were re-shot to fit the wider screen, while in many other cases (i.e. the "crazy" intervals + most scenes with the judge) stretched to fit the widescreen format, the first scenes of the Trial being set-up there lack cuts in the live version; it's one long tracking shot through the many characters in the scene while the worms form the stage. In other cases too there are scenes entirely deleted like a large humanoid cheering for the judge to "shit on him", as well as the bricks transforming into the wife/mother/schoolmaster characters after the judge's verse, cutting abruptly into Pink's memories; some of these scenes appear intact in the more recent 2010-13 tour.

== Composition ==
The track features distinctive voice work by Waters and a grandiose musical style, which is more akin to an operetta or show tune than a rock song; it is fully orchestrated, with no traditional rock elements until David Gilmour's guitar starts as the verdict is pronounced, along with Nick Mason's heavy drums.

Musically, the structure of "The Trial" is similar to an earlier track on the album, "Run Like Hell," with the same chord sequence of E minor, F, back to E minor, C, and B. However, there are various differences between the two songs, such as vastly different instrumentation. The bass alternates between the root (E) and fifth (B) of the E minor chord, and when the chord changes to F Major, the bass remains the same, resulting in a strong feeling of tension and dissonance, as the relationship between the F chord and the B note is a tritone, an unstable interval.

In the last verse (The Judge's verdict), a distorted electric guitar enters, playing a leitmotif from the album, a melody first heard in "Another Brick in the Wall" (and most recently reprised in the outro to "Waiting for the Worms").

== Concerts and versions ==
- In the Berlin performance of "The Trial", actor Albert Finney portrays the Judge, actor Tim Curry portrays the Prosecutor, musician Thomas Dolby portrays the Schoolmaster, singer and actress Ute Lemper portrays the Wife and singer Marianne Faithfull portrays the Mother. The Wall briefly "becomes" the Berlin Wall, building up graffiti like the actual wall until it is pulled down.
- In the gatefold art, when the judge looks over the crowd, it seems that the "marching hammers" of fame are all lined up in his possession.
- In the film version, the animation from the stage show is used, but certain shots (including the Schoolmaster turning into a hammer) were stretched from their original full-frame image to a 2.39:1 aspect ratio. The rest of the animation that was featured reused the original cels though expanded the backgrounds to fill the cinematic image. Waters used the film's anamorphic version for his 2010–13 tour of The Wall.
- In 2009, pianist Andreas Behrendt released an instrumental version of the song.
- The British rock group Church of the Cosmic Skull covered the song on their 2018 tribute album The Wall [Redux].

== Personnel ==
- Roger Waters – vocals
- Nick Mason – bass drum, cymbals
- David Gilmour – guitars, bass
- Richard Wright – piano

with:

- Vicki Brown and Clare Torry (credited simply as Vicki & Clare) – backing vocals
- New York orchestra conducted by Michael Kamen

Personnel per Fitch and Mahon.
