= Nobody Home =

Song by Pink Floyd

from the album The Wall
- Released: 30 November 1979
- Recorded: April–November 1979
- Genre: Progressive rock; art rock
- Length: 3:26
- Label: Harvest (UK); Columbia (US)
- Songwriter: Roger Waters
- Producers: Bob Ezrin; David Gilmour; James Guthrie; Roger Waters

Official audio
- "Nobody Home" on YouTube

"Nobody Home" is a song from the Pink Floyd eleventh studio album The Wall (1979). This song was one of several to be considered for the band's compilation album, Echoes: The Best of Pink Floyd (2001).

== Background ==
"Nobody Home" was written late into the development of The Wall after an argument between the band and Roger Waters. David Gilmour said that the song "came along when we were well into the thing [The Wall] and he'd [Waters] gone off in a sulk the night before and came in the next day with something fantastic."

== Lyrics ==
In the song, the character Pink describes his lonely life of social isolation behind his self-created mental wall. He has no one to talk to, and all he has are his possessions. The song describes what Roger Waters says he experienced during the band's 1977 tour, the band's first major stadium tour. Additionally, the song contains some references to founding Pink Floyd member, Syd Barrett. The song was written after an argument between Gilmour, Waters, and co-producer Bob Ezrin during the production of The Wall in which Gilmour and Ezrin challenged Waters to come up with one more song for the album. Waters then wrote "Nobody Home" and returned to the studio two days later to present it to the band. It was the last song written for The Wall. On the 30th anniversary of The Wall episode of the US radio show In the Studio with Redbeard, Gilmour revealed that "Nobody Home" was one of his favorite songs from the album.

A television playing in the background is frequently heard, including the line, "Surprise! Surprise, Surprise!" from the American sitcom Gomer Pyle – USMC The lyrics "I got nicotine stains on my fingers, I got a silver spoon on a chain. Got a grand piano to prop up my mortal remains" are said to have been written specifically about Floyd's keyboardist Richard Wright, who was allegedly struggling with cocaine addiction at the time.

== Personnel ==
Pink Floyd

- David Gilmour – bass guitar
- Roger Waters – vocals, EMS VCS 3
- Richard Wright – piano, Prophet-5 synthesiser

with:

- Bob Ezrin – piano
- New York Symphony Orchestra

Personnel per Fitch and Mahon.

== Cover versions ==
- An orchestrated version, arranged by Jaz Coleman of Killing Joke, performed by the London Philharmonic Orchestra, and conducted by Peter Scholes, appears on the instrumental album Us and Them: Symphonic Pink Floyd (1995).
- On Metric's 2011 tour, for their fourth studio album, Fantasies (2009).
- On the tribute album Back Against the Wall (2005), the track is performed by Rick Wakeman of Yes.
- Mark Lanegan performed the song on the tribute album The Wall Redux (2018).

== Bibliography ==
- Fitch, Vernon; Richard Mahon (2006). Comfortably Numb: A History of The Wall 1978–1981.
- Fitch, Vernon (2005). The Pink Floyd Encyclopedia (3rd edition). ISBN 1-894959-24-8.
