= ARP Quadra =

Analogue synthesizer

Quadra
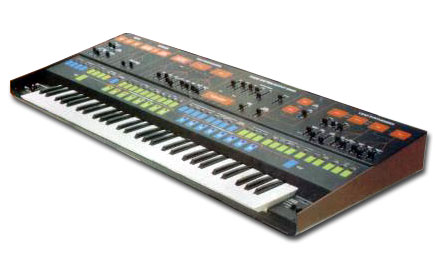
- ARP Quadra
- Manufacturer: ARP Instruments, Inc.
- Dates: 1978–1981

Technical specifications
- Polyphony: 1 (Bass), 2 (Lead), All (String, Polysynth)
- Timbrality: 4
- Oscillator: 4 (2/Lead, 1/Poly+String, 1/Bass)
- LFO: Triangle, Square
- Synthesis type: Analog Subtractive
- Attenuator: Decay (Bass), AR (String), ADSR (Poly), ADSASR (Lead)
- Storage memory: Panel Switch state, Octave, Osc. Interval
- Effects: 1 (Stereo Phase Shifter)

Input/output
- Keyboard: 61-key synth-action with Channel Aftertouch (Lead only)
- Left-hand control: Portamento VCO1, Portamento VCO2
- External control: CV/Gate

The ARP Quadra was a 61-key analog synthesizer produced by ARP Instruments, Inc. from 1978 to 1981. After the costly failure of their Centaur poly synth design and poor sales of the Avatar, they desperately needed some sort of poly synth but had neither the time or resources to develop a new product. The result was the Quadra, a paraphonic synth based on pre-existing products: the Omni string/organ/bass synth, a basic mono synth similar to the Solus, a phaser and a VCF, in one box.

It has four sections. Bass is on the bottom two octaves, has two unison bass circuits (electric and string), with AR and a single pole low pass filter and a related AD envelope for cutoff. A string section is similar to the ARP Omni. Poly Synth, and a two voice Lead Synth similar to the Solus and a five way mixer with four unit outputs, a stereo pair, a line mono and an XLR out.

There are 16 memory locations, but these do not provide storage of slider settings. The synthesizer's 8048-based microcontroller uses battery-backed CMOS SRAM storage to store and recall 16 sets of on/off decisions about which waveforms and modulations are turned on in each of the four sections, and lead intervals. Using LEDs the player is visually directed to the sliders critical to the sound selected but their settings are not updated. This necessary tweaking and fine tuning is the weakness of the Quadra.

Like the Moog Polymoog keyboard, the Quadra was not a true polyphonic. It used divide-down circuits for the Omni-style string section, including ADSR, LFO, filter and VCAs for the Polyphonic Synth section. Both Polyphonic Synth and string sections share the hollow wave button which changes waveforms for both sections.

It has a simple arpeggiator for the lead section and memorizes intervals between the two lead VCOs. Vibrato, LFO and a fast square wave trill can be added to the arpeggiation. There are the two independent portamento rates for each VCO, whether locked together or in interval mode. This is useful in either multiple or single trigger mode.

The top three octaves of the keyboard have a mechanical touch sensor that can either pitch bend or impact brilliance and filter. Unique is the flat pedal feature which allows pedaling to dip individual notes and chords a semitone below so they rise to pitch with the envelope’s attack.

Extensive CV/Gate facilities allow two external sequencers to independently control both the bass and the lead. It is capable of four independent outs, stereo out, mono, and mono XLR but hidden in the quad outs is TRS facility for processing and returning effects on individual parts of the four sections to be recombined with external audio at a built-in mixer, which includes an internal compressor circuit. Like all ARP synthesizers of this series (2800) its true character opens up with selective use of the optional foot pedals.

The Quadra uses the typical ARP orange and black color scheme of the company's later years including the orange “leather” look end pieces and the clean XLR out for DI console recording.

The price was comparable with the recently released Prophet 5, and even more expensive than buying an ARP Omni 2 and an Odyssey separately. It didn’t sell well.

In 2021, Synthchaser released a MIDI adapter for the ARP Quadra.

== Notable users ==
Notable users of the ARP Quadra include:

- David Balfe of The Teardrop Explodes
- Tony Banks of Genesis. First appeared in his Genesis work in 1980, notably in the songs "Behind the Lines", "Abacab" and "Mama"
- John Carpenter
- Rayborn Huff of David and the Giants
- Paul Davis
- Norman Beavers of Lakeside, notably in the song "Fantastic Voyage"
- Kerry Livgren of Kansas
- New Order
- Rick Wright and David Gilmour of Pink Floyd
- Joe Zawinul of Weather Report on album 8:30 track "8:30"
