= One of My Turns =

Single by Pink Floyd

from the album The Wall
- A-side: "Another Brick in the Wall, Part 2"
- Released: 23 November 1979
- Recorded: April–November 1979
- Genre: Progressive rock; hard rock
- Length: 3:37
- Label: Harvest (UK); Columbia (US)
- Songwriter: Roger Waters
- Producers: Bob Ezrin; David Gilmour; James Guthrie; Roger Waters

Pink Floyd singles chronology
"Have a Cigar" (1975)	"Another Brick in the Wall, Part 2" / "One of My Turns" (1979)	"Run Like Hell" (1980)

Official audio
- "One of My Turns" on YouTube

"One of My Turns" is a song by the English rock band Pink Floyd, appearing on their eleventh studio album The Wall (1979). The song was also released as a B-side on the single of "Another Brick in the Wall, Part 2".

== Composition ==
The song is split into distinct segments: a groupie (Trudy Young) performs a monologue ("Oh my God, what a fabulous room!") while a television plays, under which a synthesizer makes atonal sounds, which eventually resolve into a quiet song in C major in 3/4 time ("Day after day / Love turns grey / Like the skin of a dying man."). Finally, the song abruptly leaps into a hard rock song in B-flat major in 4/4 time. The song features some of Waters' most strenuous recorded vocal workouts, with him ending at a relatively high A above middle C. The composition's instrumental introduction makes use of the Phrygian mode, a musical mode rarely used in pop and rock music.

== Plot ==
The Wall is the story of Pink, an embittered and alienated rock star, whose sanity is failing as he isolates himself behind a psychological barrier. "One of My Turns" finds Pink inviting a groupie into his room after learning of his wife's affair. While the groupie tries to get his attention, he ignores her, and muses on his failed relationship with his wife. A TV can be heard in the background, the dialogue mixed in with the groupie's attempts at conversation.

While the hapless groupie continues trying to get his attention, Pink feels "Cold as a razor blade / Tight as a tourniquet / Dry as a funeral drum," before exploding into a fit of violence, destroying his room, and frightening the young woman away. When his hotel room is finally in complete shambles, and the groupie is gone, Pink feels something more: self-pity, and a lack of empathy for others, as he screams "Why are you running away?"

The show that is on the television during the beginning of the song is from September 24–26, 1979, American television soap opera Another World episodes 3864–3866. Kirk Laverty brings Iris Bancroft and her maid, Vivan Gorrow, to his lodge in the Adirondack Mountains. Dobbs was the caretaker of the lodge. Laverty is the man talking to Dobbs, not Mr. Bancroft. Laverty was played by Charles Cioffi.

== Film version ==
Pink enters his hotel room with an American groupie, played by actress Jenny Wright. The groupie tries to be friendly to Pink (Wright performs nearly the same monologue as Trudy Young did on the album). Pink is oblivious to the groupie as he watches the British epic docudrama war film The Dam Busters (1955) on television. When the groupie tries to make contact with Pink saying "Are you feeling okay?", he explodes into a violent fit of rage and begins to destroy everything in his hotel room. Pink then chases the groupie around the room throwing various objects at her, cutting his own hand after he throws a television set out his window onto the street below, shouting "Take that, fuckers!", his only non-lyrical line spoken in the film.

The scene where Pink hurts his hand while destroying the Venetian blinds was not faked. Bob Geldof did indeed cut his hand and he can be seen looking at it for a brief second, but director Alan Parker decided not to stop filming until the scene was over, despite Geldof's injury. In the next scene, the viewer can see a towel or shirt wrapped around Geldof's injured hand. Also, according to Parker's DVD commentary, Wright was informed that Geldof (as Pink) would yell at her and chase her during the scene; however the director, in order to get an authentic reaction from the actress, did not tell her that Geldof would also throw a wine bottle at her (albeit an easily breakable, prop-made bottle) at the start of his enraged outburst. Moreover, years later in an interview Wright stated that she was not told that a food cart, which just missed her by a few inches, would be thrown at her.

== Personnel ==
Pink Floyd

- Roger Waters – vocals, bass guitar
- David Gilmour – lead guitar
- Richard Wright – organ, Prophet-5 synthesizer
- Nick Mason – drums, percussion

with:

- Bob Ezrin – piano
- Lee Ritenour – rhythm guitar and rhythm guitar with a wah-wah pedal
- Trudy Young – voice of the groupie

Personnel per Fitch and Mahon.
