= List of Roger Waters band members =

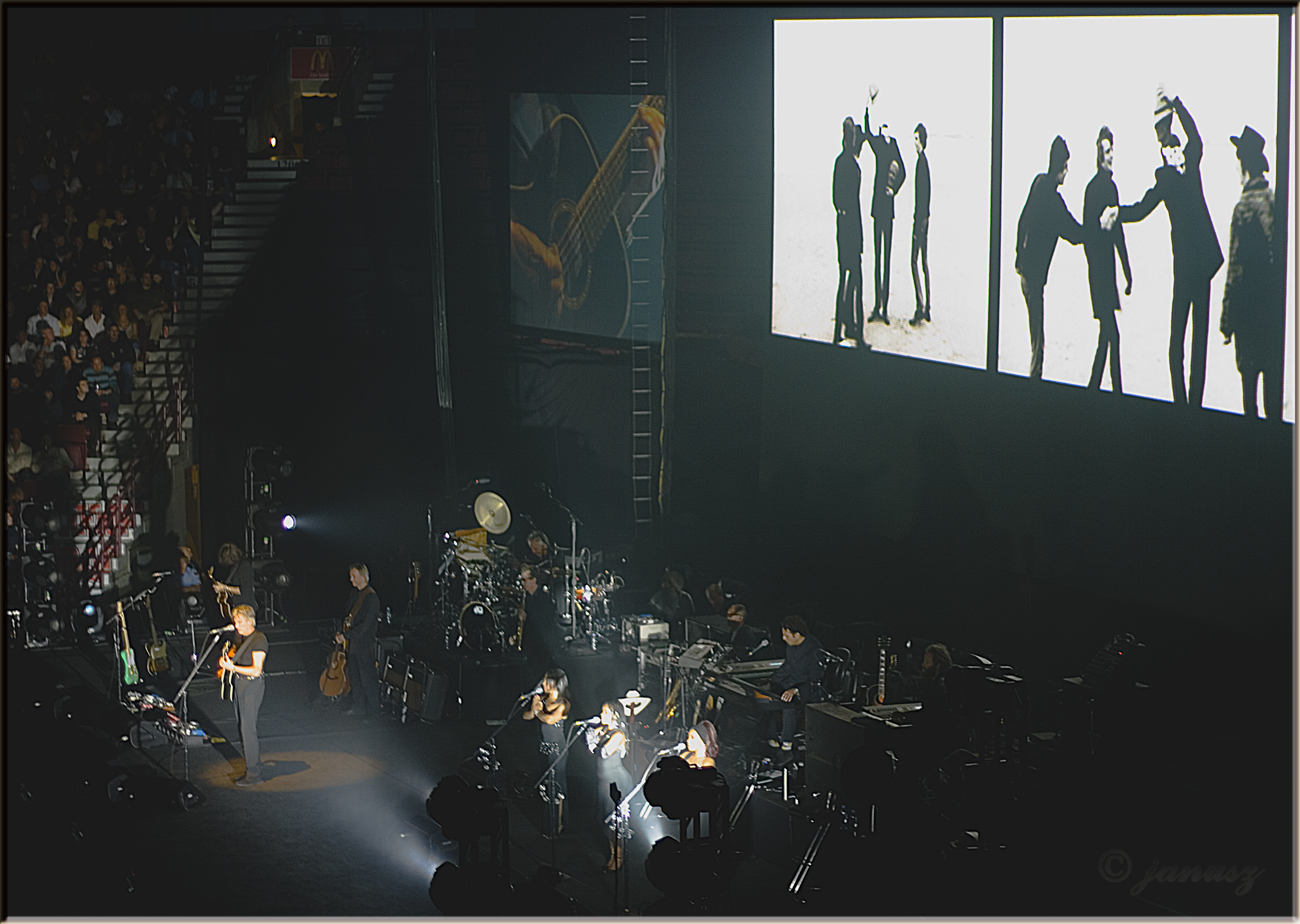
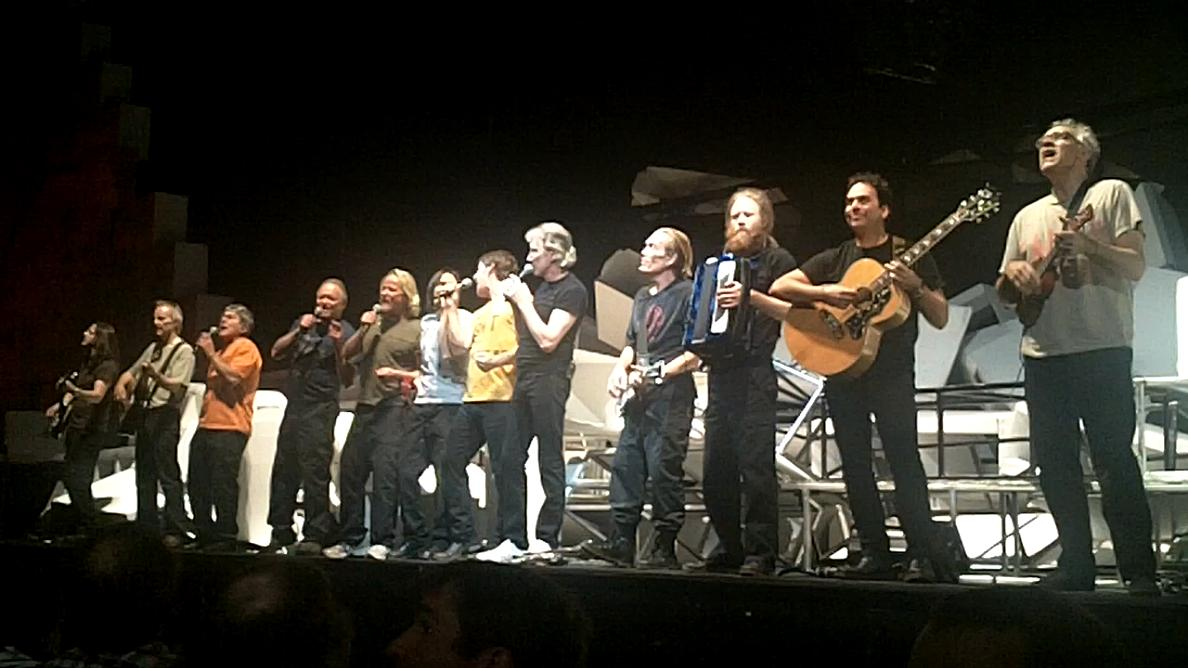
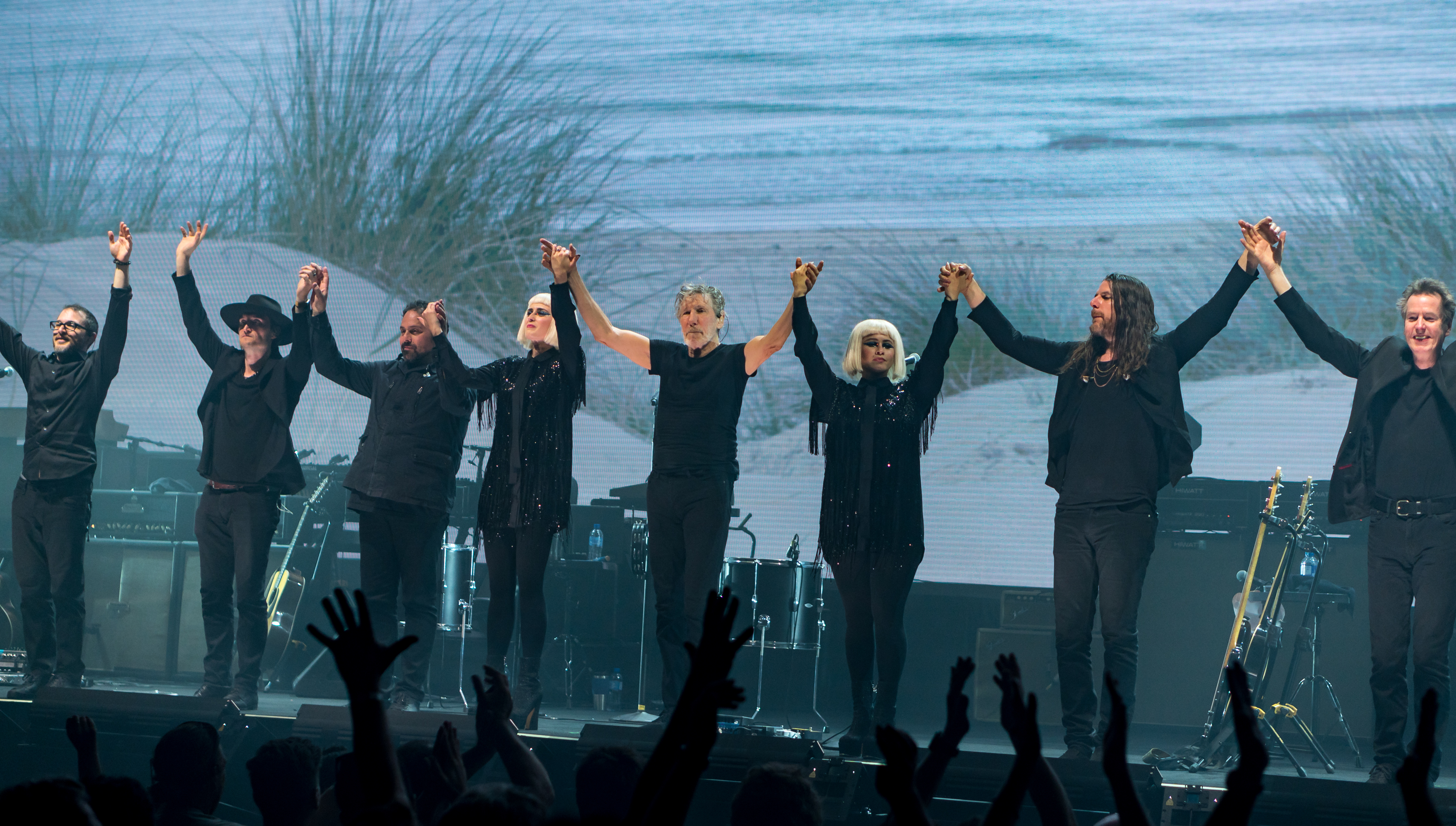
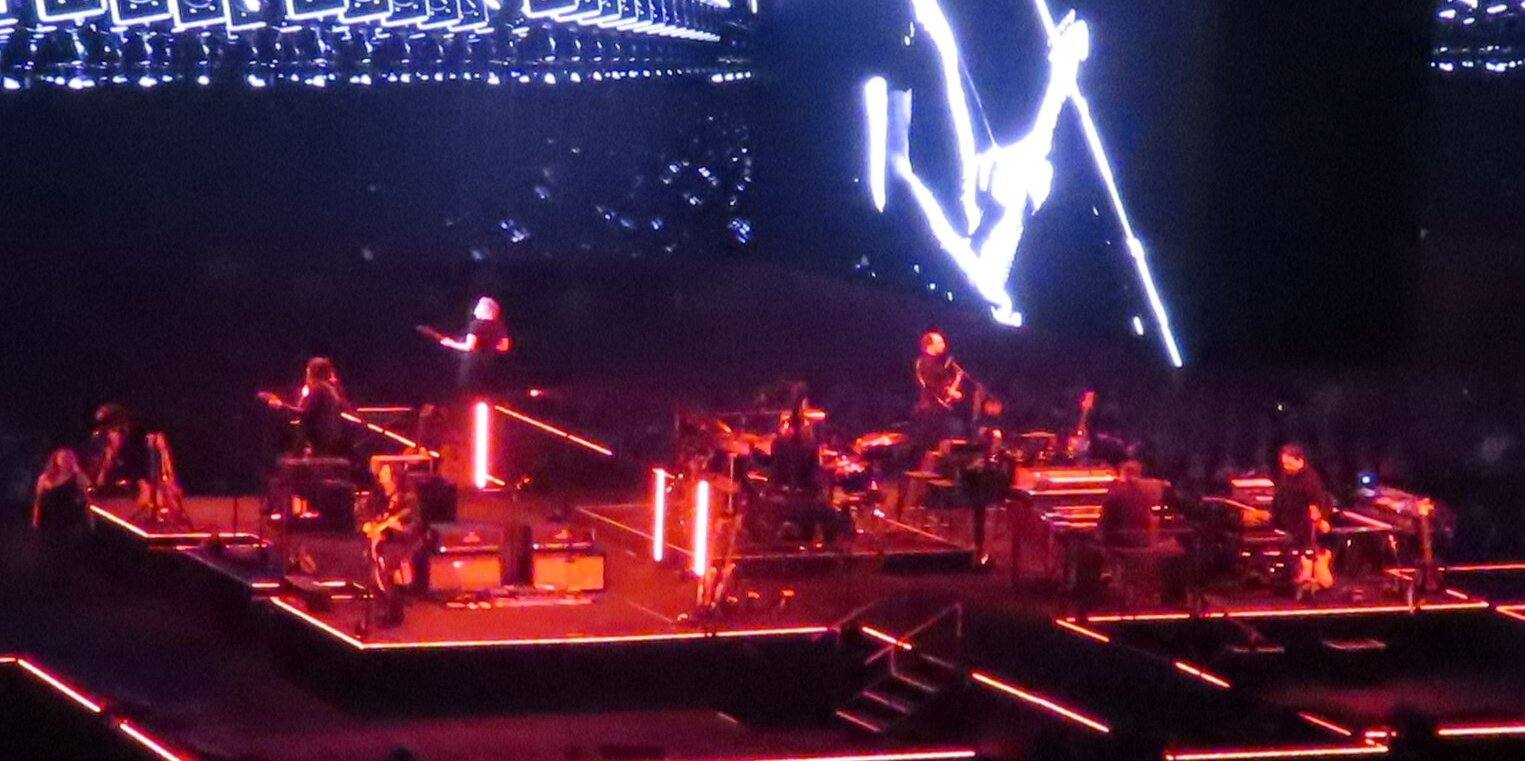
Four lineups of Roger Waters band performing in 2007, 2010, 2018 and 2023.

Roger Waters is an English musician and singer-songwriter who started his career as bassist of Pink Floyd. Before his departure from Pink Floyd, he started touring and recording under his own name in 1984. His first tour band featured Waters on vocals, bass and guitar alongside lead guitarist Eric Clapton, rhythm guitarist/bassist Tim Renwick, keyboardist Michael Kamen, organist/bassist Chris Stainton, drummer Andy Newmark, saxophonist Mel Collins, and backing vocalists, Doreen Chanter and Katie Kissoon. Current members of his band include keyboardist, guitarist and vocalist Jon Carin (from 1999 to 2000 and since 2006), guitarists/vocalists Dave Kilminster (since 2006) and Jonathan Wilson, bassist/guitarist Gus Seyffert, drummer Joey Waronker (all since 2017), organist Robert Walter, saxophonist Seamus Blake and backing vocalists Amanda Belair and Shanay Johnson (all since 2022).

== History ==
=== 1984–1992 ===
In March 1983, the last Pink Floyd album with Waters, The Final Cut, was released. It was subtitled: "A requiem for the post-war dream by Roger Waters, performed by Pink Floyd". Waters wrote all the album's lyrics and music, causing Rolling Stone to view the work as "essentially a Roger Waters solo album".

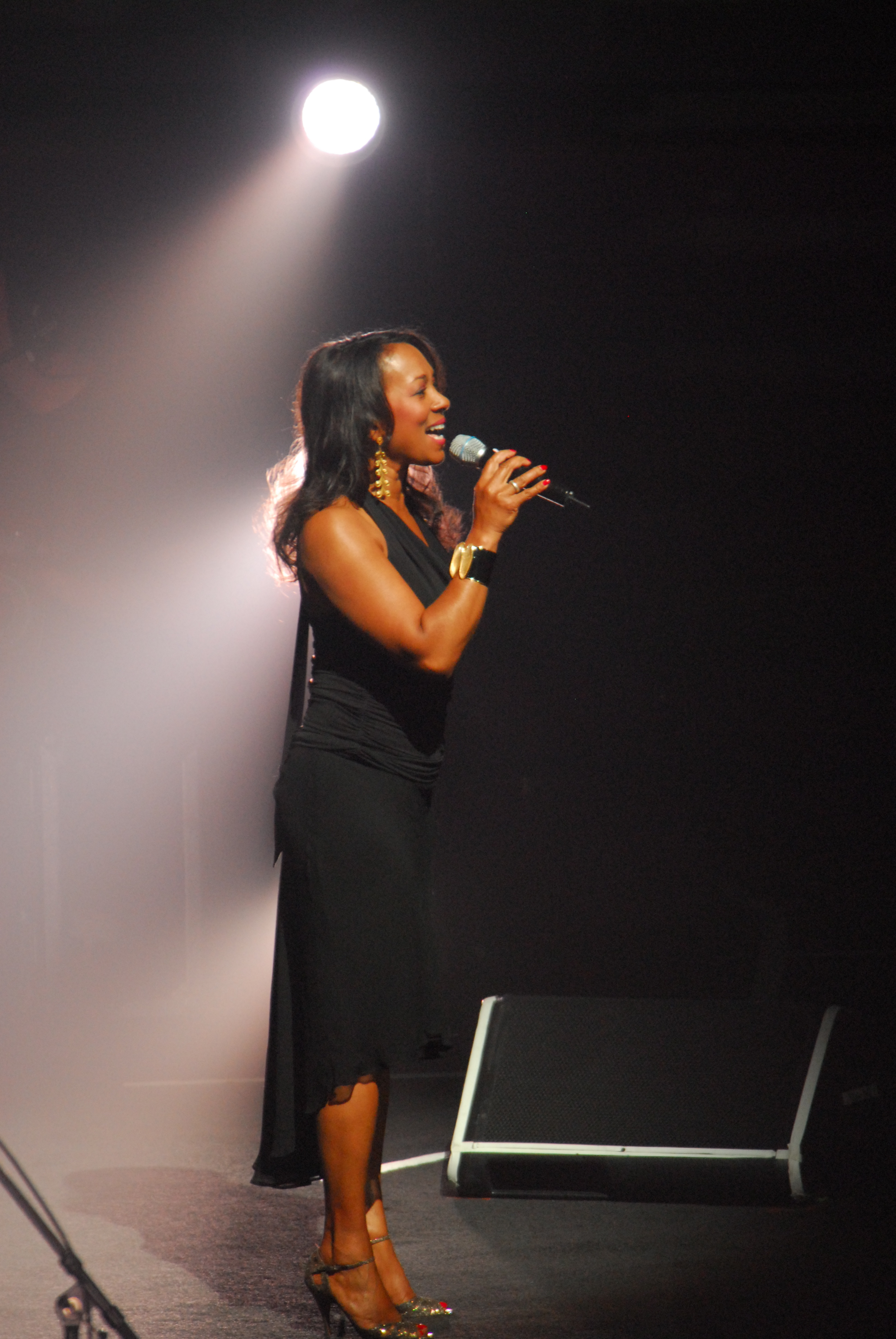
Katie Kissoon regularly performed as a backing vocalist with Waters between 1984 and 2007.

In 1984, Waters released his first solo album, The Pros and Cons of Hitch Hiking, the album featured guitarist Eric Clapton, keyboardists Andy Bown and Michael Kamen (both previously Pink Floyd collaborators) horn players Raphael Ravenscroft, Kevin Flanagan, Vic Sullivan and David Sanborn, percussionists Andy Newmark and Ray Cooper and backing vocalists Madeline Bell, Katie Kissoon and Doreen Chanter.

In support of the album, he toured in June and July 1984 with Clapton, Kamen, Newmark, Kissoon and Chanter alongside guitarist/bassist Tim Renwick, organist/bassist Chris Stainton and saxophonist Mel Collins. Tour undersold tickets causing some concerts at larger venues to be cancelled, despite Clapton's fame, but did better in 1985, though by then Clapton had been replaced by Jay Stapley along with Renwick by Andy Fairweather-Low and Stainton had also departed but was not replaced. The tour continued in 1985 between March and April, during the tour the band also played some Pink Floyd songs, as well as the first time some songs from The Final Cut were performed live.

In 1986, Waters contributed songs and a score to the soundtrack of the animated film When the Wind Blows, based on the Raymond Briggs book of the same name. His backing band featured himself, Stapley, and Collins with guest keyboardist/vocalist Paul Carrack, bassist John Gordon, keyboardists Nick Glennie-Smith and Matt Irving, drummers John Lingwood and Freddie Krc and former Pink Floyd backing vocalist Clare Torry. The album was credited as Roger Waters and The Bleeding Heart Band; other artists on the soundtrack include David Bowie, Hugh Cornwell, Genesis, Squeeze and Paul Hardcastle.

In 1987, Waters released Radio K.A.O.S., which featured Waters, Collins, Fairweather-Low, Stapley, Carrack, Glennie-Smith, Irving and Lingwood alongside drummer Graham Broad, multi-instrumentalist Ian Ritchie. Waters toured in support of the album in 1987; the touring band included returning members Fairweather-Low, Stapley, Collins, Kissoon, Chanter, with new members Graham Broad on drums and Paul Carrack on keyboards and vocals. The setlist included both Waters solo and Pink Floyd material and saw Waters splitting lead vocals with Carrack on several songs.

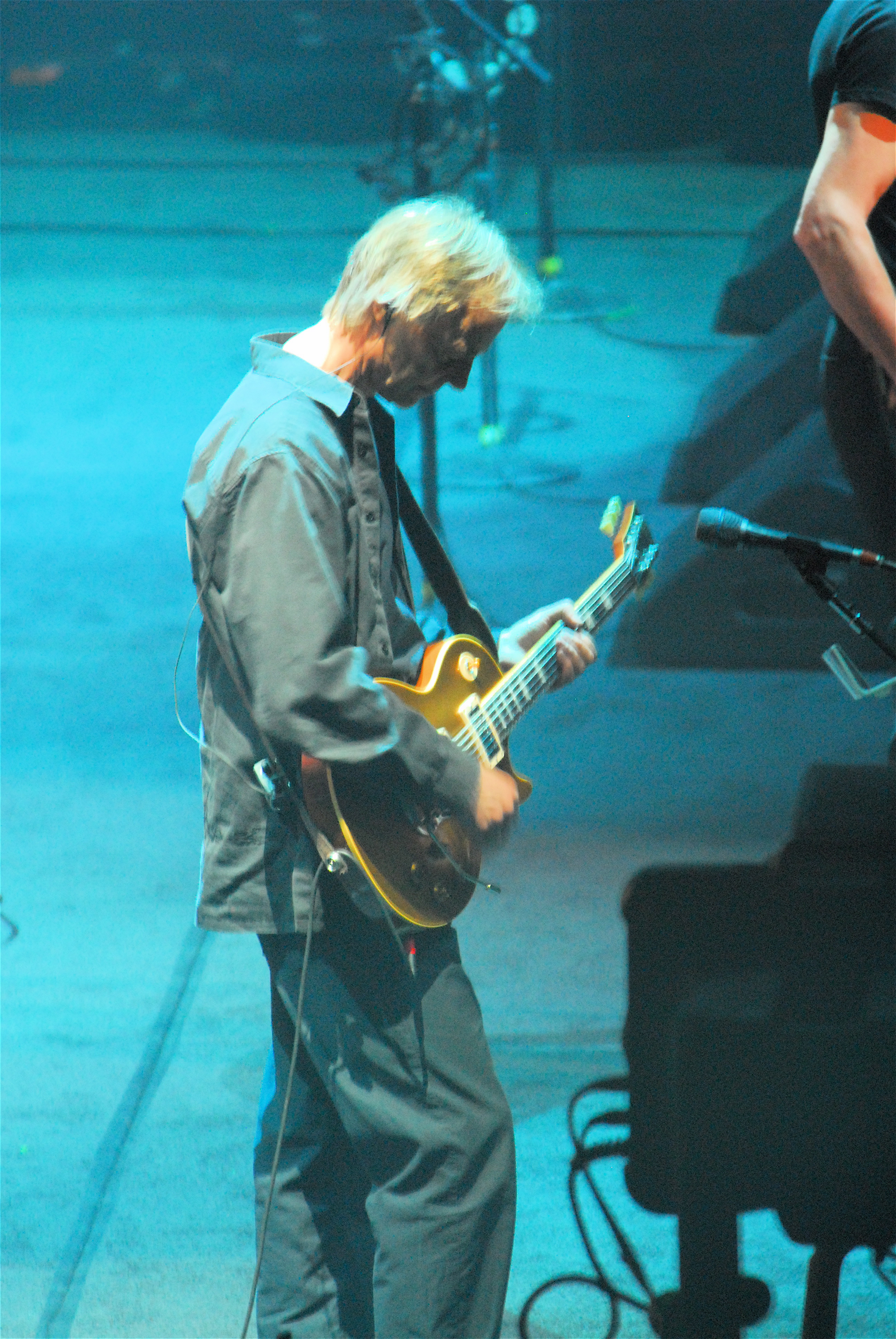
Snowy White first performed with Waters in Pink Floyd between 1977 and 1980 and later joined his band between 1990 and 2016.

After the tour concluded in November 1987, Waters' next show was a performance of Pink Floyd's The Wall on top of the recently fallen Berlin Wall in July 1990. The show featured various guest performers supported by The Bleeding Heart Band which featured Fairweather-Low, Glennie-Smith and Broad with new member Rick Di Fonzo on guitar, as well as the original Pink Floyd tour personnel Snowy White on guitar, Peter Wood on keyboards, and backing vocalists Stan Farber, Joe Chemay, Jim Haas and John Joyce. On 21 August 1990 an album and video of the concert was released under the name The Wall – Live in Berlin.

Following the show, Waters continued to work on his third solo album Amused to Death, which work had started on in 1987, with producer and keyboardist Patrick Leonard. The album features guest appearances from guitarist Jeff Beck alongside various session musicians including live members Graham Broad, Andy Fairweather-Low, Rick DiFonzo, Doreen Chanter, Katie Kissoon, Jon Joyce, Stan Farber and Jim Haas as well as other guest appearances from soul singer P.P. Arnold, Eagles drummer Don Henley and members of Toto.

Prior to the release of Amused to Death, Waters performed at Guitar Legends festival in Seville, Spain on 18 October 1991. The band featured guitarists Andy Fairweather-Low and Snowy White, keyboardists Peter Wood and Patrick Leonard, drummer Graham Broad, guest bassist Tony Levin, and backing vocalists Katie Kissoon and Doreen Chanter. The concert featured a debut live performance of "What God Wants, Part I" and a guest appearance from singer and pianist Bruce Hornsby on "Comfortably Numb". This show would be Waters' last for almost 8 years.

=== 1999–2013 ===
After Amused to Death was released, a tour did not happen. Instead, the first time material was played was at Waters' In the Flesh tour in 1999, the band for this tour included returning members Andy Fairweather-Low, Snowy White, Graham Broad and Katie Kissoon, as well as new members guitarist/vocalist Doyle Bramhall II (who had previously worked with Eric Clapton), keyboardist/guitarist/vocalist Jon Carin (who had worked with post-Waters Pink Floyd), organist Andy Wallace and new backing vocalist P. P. Arnold (who had recorded with Waters on Amused to Death).

This tour, Waters' first in 12 years, did financially well and even had some shows at smaller venues being upgraded to larger venues. The tour continued into 2000 with the band staying the same except for the addition of Prince collaborator Susannah Melvoin joining on backing vocals and various guest saxophonists, including former member Mel Collins, Memphis Horns members Wayne Jackson (on trumpet) and Andrew Love as well as jazz musicians Ed Calle, Don Menza, Steve Tavaglione and various other musicians, a live album and DVD of the tour was recorded mainly on 27 June 2000 at Rose Garden Arena in Portland, Oregon, which featured saxophonist Norbert Stachel.

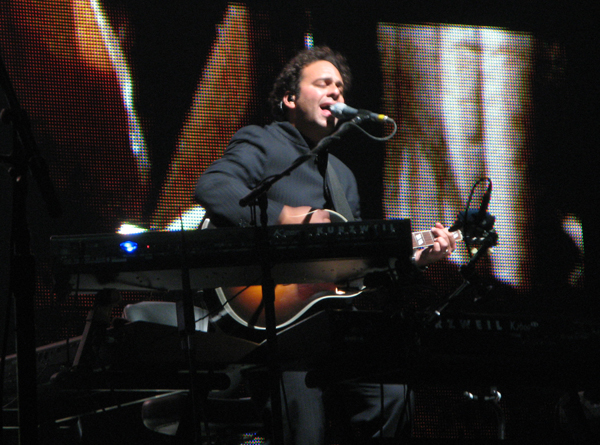
Jon Carin started performing with Pink Floyd from 1986 and joined Waters in 1999.

The tour continued into 2002, taking a break in 2001, with new a change in band members. Bramhall and Melvoin departed and were replaced by Chester Kamen and Linda Lewis respectively, as well as Carin being replaced by Harry Waters (Roger's son), soon after the tour began, Lewis was replaced by Carol Kenyon and saxophonist Norbert Stachel as a permanent member. This leg also featured a guest appearance from Waters former Pink Floyd bandmate Nick Mason on 26 and 27 June. The tour concluded at the Glastonbury Festival on 30 June.

The next time Waters performed live was with his former Pink Floyd bandmates at Live 8 in July 2005 at Hyde Park, musicians at that show were the bands Classic line-up of David Gilmour (guitar, vocals, pedal steel), Waters (bass, vocals, guitar), Richard Wright (keyboards) and Nick Mason (drums), as well as mutual collaborators Jon Carin (keyboards, vocals, lap steel), Tim Renwick (guitar, bass), Dick Parry (saxophone) and Carol Kenyon (backing vocals).

Waters' next release after Live 8 was Ça Ira, a classical style opera which worked had started on in 1989.

In 2006, Waters started on The Dark Side of the Moon Live, which included a similar band to the In the Flesh tour with White, Fairweather-Low, H. Waters and Broad as well as Kenyon, Kissoon and Arnold, the tour also featured a returning Jon Carin and new guitarist/vocalist Dave Kilminster and former producer Ian Ritchie on saxophone. The tour started at to Rock in Rio festival on 2 June 2006, and continued into 2007 with personnel staying the same. In 2008 the band had some major changes, long-time members, Katie Kissoon (who had performed at every show up to that point except The Wall - Live in Berlin) and Andy Fairweather-Low (who had played at every show since 1985) both departed and were replaced by Sylvia Mason-James and a returning Chester Kamen respectively.

On 10 July 2010, Waters made an appearance with his former Pink Floyd bandmate David Gilmour at a charity gig for the Hoping Foundation, backing the band included Guy Pratt on bass and acoustic guitar (who had performed with post Waters Pink Floyd), Harry Waters on keyboards, Andy Newmark on drums, Chester Kamen on guitar and Jonjo Grisdale also on keyboards.

Waters' next tour was a full staging of The Wall which toured between 2010 and 2013, the tour band included returning members Dave Kilminster, Snowy White, Graham Broad, Jon Carin, Harry Waters and John Joyce and new members G. E. Smith (guitar/bass), Robbie Wyckoff (lead and backing vocals) and Venice members Kipp Lennon, Mark Lennon and Pat Lennon. H. Waters and Joyce also performed on the original album. The tour started on 15 September 2010 in Toronto and concluded in Paris 21 September 2013. The tour featured a guest appearance from Gilmour on "Comfortably Numb" and "Outside the Wall" at London O2 show, 12 May 2011, Nick Mason also played tambourine on "Outside the Wall" at that show.

=== 2015–2023 ===
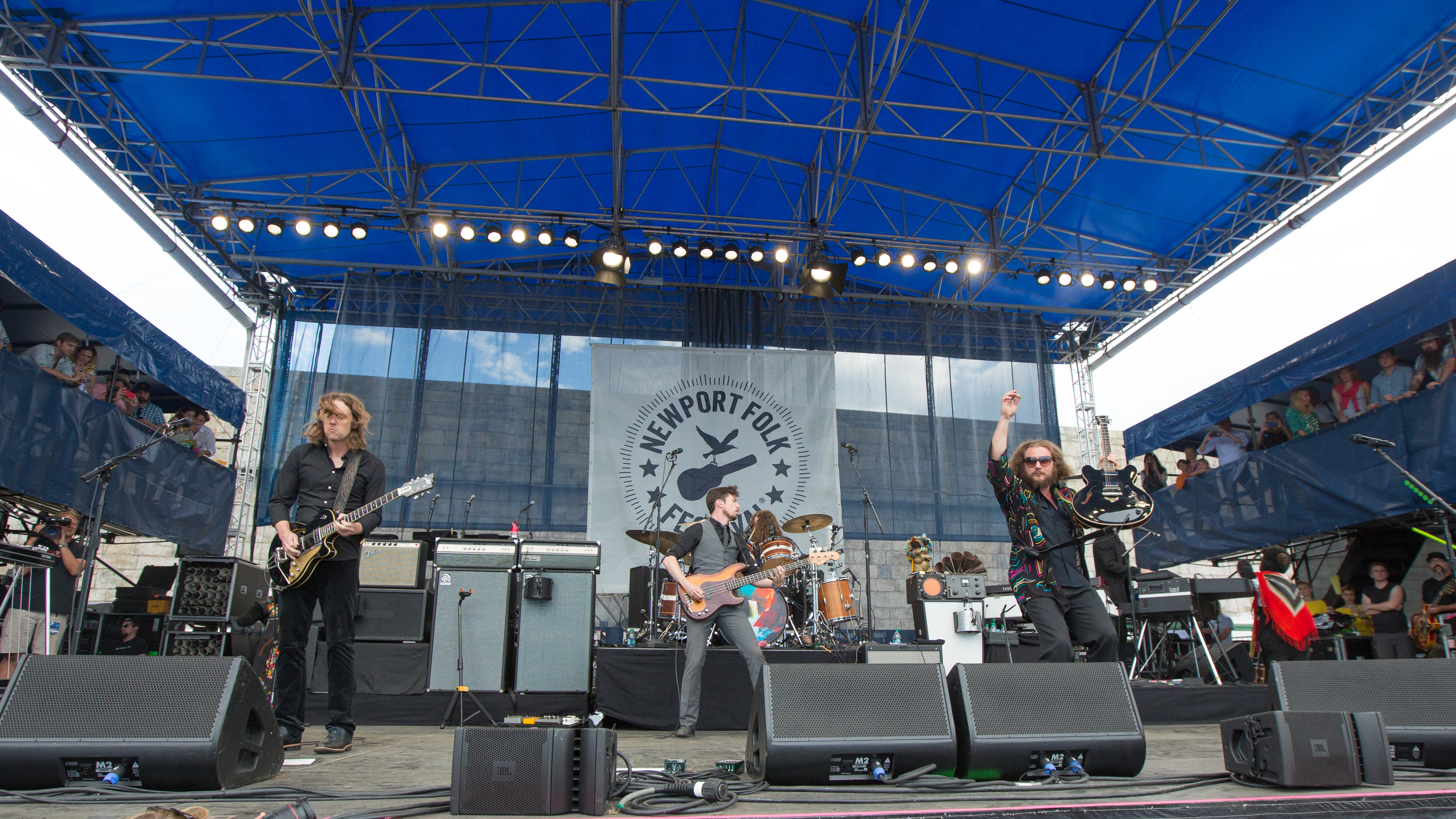
My Morning Jacket acted as a backing band for Waters at the Newport Folk Festival in 2015.

In 2015, Waters headlined the Newport Folk Festival in Newport, Rhode Island, with Jim James (guitar, vocals), Tom Blankenship (bass) Patrick Hallahan (drums) Bo Koster (keys) and Carl Broemel (guitar, pedal steel) of the band My Morning Jacket, along with G.E. Smith (guitar) and Jess Wolfe and Holly Laessig (backing vocals) of the band Lucius acting as a backing band. This show also featured guest appearances from singer Amy Helm and fiddler Sara Watkins.

The next shows were three concerts in Mexico City on September 28, 29 and October 1, and at the Desert Trip festival on October 9 and 16. The band for these shows was similar to that of The Wall tour, but included Wolfe and Laessig instead of the male vocalists.

Waters released his first solo album in nearly 25 years, Is This the Life We Really Want?, on 2 June 2017. Musicians on the album included Gus Seyffert on guitar, keyboards and bass, Nigel Godrich and Jonathan Wilson on guitar and keyboards, Roger Joseph Manning Jr. and Lee Pardini on keyboards, Joey Waronker on drums and Wolfe and Laessig on vocals. Arrangements were provided by Godrich and David Campbell and the album was also produced by Godrich.

The album had a tour to accompany it, the Us + Them Tour, which started in Kansas city on 26 May 2017 and ran till 9 December 2018 at Monterrey and included legs in North America, Europe and South America, included larger line-up changes, with Smith, White, Broad and H. Waters, departing and Seyffert, Wilson, Waronker and Drew Erickson joining, replacing the musicians and saxophonist Ian Ritchie returning. Erickson left due to an injury and was replaced by Bo Koster. A live album and video of the tour called Roger Waters: Us + Them was released on 2 October 2020, which included Amsterdam shows of 18 – 23 June 2018 at the Ziggo Dome.

In January 2020, Waters officially announced the This Is Not a Drill tour which was scheduled to happen in North America between July and October of that year and was described as a "first farewell tour". However, in March, the tour was postposed to 2021 due to the coronavirus pandemic outbreak, this was later changed to 2022.

During the pandemic, Waters posted re-recordings of his previous songs on YouTube under the name The Lockdown Sessions, these recordings featured all the members of the Us + Them tour band, and were later releases on an album in December 2022, along with a re-recording of Comfortably Numb called Comfortably Numb 2022.

The touring band was revealed on The Late Show with Stephen Colbert in June 2022, and featured returning members Jon Carin, Dave Kilminster, Gus Seyffert and Joey Waronker, with new members Robert Walter on organ, Seamus Blake on saxophone and Amanda Belair and Shanay Johnson on backing vocals. Ian Ritchie had intended to be part of the tour but had to step down during rehearsals due to health issues. The tour was extended to have legs in Europe between March and June 2023, and South America between October and December 2023.

== Members ==
=== Current members ===
Image	Name	Years active	Instruments	Release contributions
	Roger Waters	1984–present	lead vocals; bass guitar; rhythm guitar; piano (2015, 2020–present); trumpet (2010–2013)	all releases
	Jon Carin	1999–2000; 2006–2013; 2016–present	piano; keyboards; programming; lap steel guitar; rhythm guitar; vocals (lead (1999–2000, 2006–2008), backing (1999–2000, 2006–2008, 2016–present); Marxophone (2022–present)	In the Flesh – Live (2000); Flickering Flame: The Solo Years Volume 1 (2002); Roger Waters: The Wall (2015); The Lockdown Sessions (2022); Roger Waters: This Is Not a Drill - Live from Prague (2023)
	Dave Kilminster	2006–2013; 2016–present	lead guitar; talk box; vocals (co-lead (2006–2008), backing (2006–2008, 2016–present); additional bass guitar (2006–2013); banjo (2010–2013)	Roger Waters: The Wall (2015); The Lockdown Session (2022); Roger Waters: This Is Not a Drill - Live from Prague (2023)
	Gus Seyffert	2017–present	rhythm guitar; bass guitar; backing vocals; accordion (2022–present)	Is This the Life We Really Want? (2017); Roger Waters: Us + Them (2020); The Lockdown Sessions (2022); Roger Waters: This Is Not a Drill - Live from Prague (2023)
	Jonathan Wilson	2017–present	lead and rhythm guitar; lead and backing vocals	Is This the Life We Really Want? (2017); Roger Waters: Us + Them (2020); The Lockdown Sessions (2022); Roger Waters: This Is Not a Drill - Live from Prague (2023)
	Joey Waronker	2017–present	drums; percussion	Is This the Life We Really Want? (2017); Roger Waters: Us + Them (2020); The Lockdown Sessions (2022); Roger Waters: This Is Not a Drill - Live from Prague (2023)
	Robert Walter	2022–present	Hammond B3 organ; keyboards; piano; melodica	The Lockdown Sessions (2022) one track only; Roger Waters: This Is Not a Drill - Live from Prague (2023)
	Shanay Johnson	2022–present	backing and lead vocals; percussion	The Lockdown Sessions (2022) one track only; Roger Waters: This Is Not a Drill - Live from Prague (2023)
	Amanda Belair	2022–present	backing and lead vocals; percussion	The Lockdown Sessions (2022) one track only; Roger Waters: This Is Not a Drill - Live from Prague (2023)
	Seamus Blake	2022–present	saxophone; clarinet	Roger Waters: This Is Not a Drill - Live from Prague (2023)

=== Former members ===
Image	Name	Years active	Instruments	Release contributions
	Katie Kissoon	1984–1987; 1991; 1999–2007	backing and lead vocals; percussion	The Pros and Cons of Hitch Hiking (1984); Radio K.A.O.S. (1987); Amused to Death (1992); In the Flesh – Live (2000); Flickering Flame: The Solo Years Volume 1 (2002)
	Doreen Chanter	1984–1987; 1991	backing vocals	The Pros and Cons of Hitch Hiking (1984); Radio K.A.O.S. (1987); Amused to Death (1992); Flickering Flame: The Solo Years Volume 1 (2002)
	Mel Collins	1984–1987; 2000	saxophone	When the Wind Blows: Original Motion Picture Soundtrack (1986); Radio K.A.O.S. (1987); Flickering Flame: The Solo Years Volume 1 (2002)
	Michael Kamen	1984–1985 (died 2003)	piano; keyboards; arrangements	The Pros and Cons of Hitch Hiking (1984); Amused to Death (1992); Flickering Flame: The Solo Years Volume 1 (2002)
	Andy Newmark	1984–1985	drums; percussion	The Pros and Cons of Hitch Hiking (1984); Flickering Flame: The Solo Years Volume 1 (2002)
	Eric Clapton	1984	lead guitar; backing vocals	The Pros and Cons of Hitch Hiking (1984); Flickering Flame: The Solo Years Volume 1 (2002)
	Chris Stainton	1984	Hammond organ; keyboards; bass guitar	none – live performances only
	Tim Renwick	1984	rhythm guitar; bass guitar; backing vocals	none – live performances only
	Andy Fairweather Low	1985–2007	rhythm guitar; bass guitar; backing vocals	Radio K.A.O.S. (1987); The Wall – Live in Berlin (1990); Amused to Death (1992); In the Flesh – Live (2000); Flickering Flame: The Solo Years Volume 1 (2002)
	Jay Stapley	1985–1987	lead guitar; backing vocals	When the Wind Blows: Original Motion Picture Soundtrack (1986); Radio K.A.O.S. (1987); Flickering Flame: The Solo Years Volume 1 (2002)
	Graham Broad	1987–2016	drums; percussion	Radio K.A.O.S. (1987); The Wall – Live in Berlin (1990); Amused to Death (1992); In the Flesh – Live (2000); Flickering Flame: The Solo Years Volume 1 (2002); Roger Waters: The Wall (2015)
	Paul Carrack	1987 (guest in 1990)	keyboards; lead and backing vocals	When the Wind Blows: Original Motion Picture Soundtrack (1986); Radio K.A.O.S. (1987); The Wall – Live in Berlin (1990) (on "Hey You" and "The Tide Is Turning"
	Snowy White	1990–2013; 2016	lead and rhythm guitar	The Wall – Live in Berlin (1990); In the Flesh – Live (2000); Roger Waters: The Wall (2015); Flickering Flame: The Solo Years Volume 1 (2002)
	Peter Wood	1990–1991 (died 1993)	keyboards; organ; synthesizers	The Wall – Live in Berlin (1990)
	Nick Glennie-Smith	1990	keyboards; organ; synthesizers	When the Wind Blows: Original Motion Picture Soundtrack (1986); Radio K.A.O.S. (1987); The Wall – Live in Berlin (1990)
	Rick Di Fonzo	1990	lead guitar	The Wall – Live in Berlin (1990); Amused to Death (1992)
	Joe Chemay	1990	backing vocals	The Wall – Live in Berlin (1990); Amused to Death (1992)
	Stan Farber	1990	backing vocals; percussion	The Wall – Live in Berlin (1990); Amused to Death (1992)
	Jim Haas	1990 (died 2018)	backing vocals; percussion	The Wall – Live in Berlin (1990); Amused to Death (1992)
	John Joyce	1990; 2010–2013	backing vocals; percussion	The Wall – Live in Berlin (1990); Amused to Death (1992); Roger Waters: The Wall (2015)
	Patrick Leonard	1991	keyboards; programming; arrangements; acoustic piano; Hammond organ; synthesisers	Amused to Death (1992); Flickering Flame: The Solo Years Volume 1 (2002)
	Tony Levin	1991	bass guitar	none – one live performance
	P. P. Arnold	1999–2008 (session 1987–1992)	backing and lead vocals; percussion	Amused to Death (1992); In the Flesh – Live (2000); Flickering Flame: The Solo Years Volume 1 (2002)
	Andy Wallace	1999–2002	Hammond organ; keyboards; backing vocals	In the Flesh – Live (2000); Flickering Flame: The Solo Years Volume 1 (2002)
	Doyle Bramhall II	1999–2000	lead guitar; lead and backing vocals	In the Flesh – Live (2000); Flickering Flame: The Solo Years Volume 1 (2002)
	Susannah Melvoin	2000	backing vocals; percussion	In the Flesh – Live (2000); Flickering Flame: The Solo Years Volume 1 (2002)
	Norbert Stachel	2000; 2002	saxophone; penny whistle	In the Flesh – Live (2000)
	Harry Waters	2002–2013; 2016	keyboards and acoustic guitar (2002); Hammond organ, piano and synthesiser (2006–2013, 2016); accordion (2010–2013)	Roger Waters: The Wall (2015)
	Chester Kamen	2002; 2008	lead guitar and lead vocals (2002); rhythm guitar; backing vocals; bass guitar (2008)	none – live performances only
	Linda Lewis	2002 (died 2023)	backing vocals; percussion	none – live performances only
	Carol Kenyon	2002–2008	backing and lead vocals; percussion	none – live performances only
	Ian Ritchie	2006–2008; 2017–2021 (Note: Ritchie intended to be part of the This Is Not a Drill tour but he had to step down during rehearsals due to health issues, he was replaced by Seamus Blake.) (session 1986)	saxophone; EWI; bass guitar; keyboards, programming and percussion (session only)	Radio K.A.O.S. (1987); Flickering Flame: The Solo Years Volume 1 (2002); Roger Waters: Us + Them (2020); The Lockdown Sessions (2022)
	Sylvia Mason-James	2008	backing vocals; percussion	none – live performances only
	G. E. Smith	2010–2016	rhythm and lead guitars; bass guitar; backing vocals (2016); mandolin (2010–2013)	Roger Waters: The Wall (2015)
	Robbie Wyckoff	2010–2016	lead and backing vocals; percussion	Roger Waters: The Wall (2015)
	Kipp Lennon	2010–2013	backing vocals; percussion	Roger Waters: The Wall (2015)
	Mark Lennon	2010–2013	backing vocals; percussion	Roger Waters: The Wall (2015)
	Pat Lennon	2010–2013	backing vocals; percussion	Roger Waters: The Wall (2015)
	Bo Koster	2015; 2017–2021	Hammond organ; piano; keyboards; backing vocals (2015)	Roger Waters: Us + Them (2020); The Lockdown Sessions (2022)
	Jim James	2015	guitar; vocals	none – one live performance only
	Tom Blankenship	2015	bass guitar	none – one live performance only
	Patrick Hallahan	2015	drums; percussion	none – one live performance only
	Carl Broemel	2015	guitars; pedal steel; backing vocals	none – one live performance only
	Drew Erickson	2017	Hammond organ; piano; keyboards	none – part of a tour, withdrew due to injury
	Jess Wolfe	2015–2021	backing and lead vocals; percussion	Is This the Life We Really Want? (2017); Roger Waters: Us + Them (2020); The Lockdown Sessions (2022)
	Holly Laessig	2015–2021	backing and lead vocals; percussion	Is This the Life We Really Want? (2017); Roger Waters: Us + Them (2020); The Lockdown Sessions (2022)

== Additional contributors ==
=== Session ===
Image	Name	Years active	Instruments	Release contributions
	Andy Bown	1983	Hammond organ; 12-string guitar	The Pros and Cons of Hitch Hiking (1984)
	Raphael Ravenscroft	1983 (died 2014)	horns	The Pros and Cons of Hitch Hiking (1984)
	Kevin Flanagan	1983	horns	The Pros and Cons of Hitch Hiking (1984)
	Vic Sullivan	1983	horns	The Pros and Cons of Hitch Hiking (1984)
	David Sanborn	1983 (died 2024)	saxophone	The Pros and Cons of Hitch Hiking (1984)
	Ray Cooper	1983	percussion	The Pros and Cons of Hitch Hiking (1984)
	Andy Quigley ('Welshman in Operating Theatre')	1983	voices	The Pros and Cons of Hitch Hiking (1984)
	Cherry Vanilla ('Hitch Hiker' and 'Waitress')	1983	voices	The Pros and Cons of Hitch Hiking (1984)
	Manning Redwood ('Truck Driver')	1983	voices	The Pros and Cons of Hitch Hiking (1984)
	Beth Porter ('Wife')	1983 (died 2023)	voices	The Pros and Cons of Hitch Hiking (1984)
	Ed Bishop ('Truck Drivers')	1983 (died 2005)	voices	The Pros and Cons of Hitch Hiking (1984)
	Jack Palance ('Hell's Angel')	1983 (died 2006)	voices	The Pros and Cons of Hitch Hiking (1984)
	Madeline Bell ('Hell's Angel's Girlfriend')	1983; 1986	backing vocals; voices	The Pros and Cons of Hitch Hiking (1984); Radio K.A.O.S. (1987)
	John Gordon	1985	bass guitar	When the Wind Blows (1986)
	Freddie Krc	1985	drums; percussion	When the Wind Blows (1986)
	Matt Irving	1985 (died 2015)	keyboards; organ	When the Wind Blows (1986); Radio K.A.O.S. (1987)
	John Lingwood	1985	Linn programming; drums	When the Wind Blows (1986); Radio K.A.O.S. (1987)
	Suzanne Rhatigan	1986	backing vocals	Radio K.A.O.S. (1987)
	Steve Langer	1986	backing vocals	Radio K.A.O.S. (1987)
	Vicki Brown	1986 (died 1991)	backing vocals	Radio K.A.O.S. (1987)
	John Thirkell	1986	trumpet	Radio K.A.O.S. (1987)
	Peter Thoms	1986	trombone	Radio K.A.O.S. (1987)
	Jeff Beck	1987–1992 (died 2023)	guitar	Amused to Death (1992)
	Luis Conte	1987–1992	percussion	Amused to Death (1992)
	Geoff Whitehorn	1987–1992	guitar	Amused to Death (1992)
	Tim Pierce	1987–1992	guitar	Amused to Death (1992)
	Steve Lukather	1987–1992	guitar	Amused to Death (1992)
	B.J. Cole	1987–1992	pedal steel guitar	Amused to Death (1992)
	Bruce Gaitsch	1987–1992	acoustic guitar	Amused to Death (1992)
	David Paich	1987–1992	Hammond organ	Amused to Death (1992)
	John "Rabbit" Bundrick	1987–1992	Hammond organ	Amused to Death (1992)
	Randy Jackson	1987–1992	bass	Amused to Death (1992)
	Jimmy Johnson	1987–1992	bass	Amused to Death (1992)
	John Pierce	1987–1992	bass	Amused to Death (1992)
	John Patitucci	1987–1992	bass	Amused to Death (1992)
	Brian Macleod	1987–1992	snare; hi-hat	Amused to Death (1992)
	Denny Fongheiser	1987–1992	drums	Amused to Death (1992)
	Jeff Porcaro	1987–1992 (died 1992)	drums	Amused to Death (1992)
	Steve Sidwell	1987–1992	cornet	Amused to Death (1992)
	Guo Yi & the Peking Brothers	1987–1992	dulcimer; lute; zhen; oboe; bass	Amused to Death (1992)
	John Dupree	1987–1992	strings arranger and conductor	Amused to Death (1992)
	Marv Albert	1987–1992	commentary	Amused to Death (1992)
	Alf Razzell	1987–1992	speech	Amused to Death (1992)
	Charles Fleischer	1987–1992	speech	Amused to Death (1992)
	London Welsh Chorale	1987–1992	choir	Amused to Death (1992)
	N'Dea Davenport	1987–1992	backing vocals	Amused to Death (1992)
	Natalie Jackson	1987–1992	backing vocals	Amused to Death (1992)
	Lynn Fiddmont-Linsey	1987–1992	backing vocals	Amused to Death (1992)
	Jessica Leonard	1987–1992	backing vocals	Amused to Death (1992)
	Jordan Leonard	1987–1992	backing vocals	Amused to Death (1992)
	Screaming Kids	1987–1992	backing vocals	Amused to Death (1992)
	Don Henley	1987–1992	harmony vocals	Amused to Death (1992)
	Rita Coolidge	1987–1992	harmony vocals	Amused to Death (1992)
	Roger Joseph Manning Jr.	2017	keyboards	Is This the Life We Really Want? (2017)
	Lee Pardini	2017	keyboards	Is This the Life We Really Want? (2017)
	David Campbell	2017	string arrangements	Is This the Life We Really Want? (2017)
	Nigel Godrich	2017; 2022	guitar; keyboards; sound collages; arrangements; strings; backing vocals	Is This the Life We Really Want? (2017); The Lockdown Sessions (2022)

=== Guests ===
Image	Name	Years active	Instruments	Notes
	Clare Torry	1985–1987	lead and backing vocals	Torry contributed lead vocals on "The Great Gig in the Sky" on 26 August at Madison Square Garden and on 21 and 22 November at Wembley Arena during the Radio K.A.O.S. tour in 1987. She also contributed backing vocals to When the Wind Blows (1986) and lead vocals to "Home" and "Four Minutes" from Radio K.A.O.S. (1987)
	Klaus Meine	1990	lead vocals; tambourine	Then current members of Scorpions performed "In the Flesh?", "In the Flesh", "Run Like Hell" and "Waiting for the Worms" at The Wall – Live in Berlin concert.
	Rudolf Schenker	1990	rhythm guitar; backing vocals	Then current members of Scorpions performed "In the Flesh?", "In the Flesh", "Run Like Hell" and "Waiting for the Worms" at The Wall – Live in Berlin concert.
	Matthias Jabs	1990	lead guitar; backing vocals	Then current members of Scorpions performed "In the Flesh?", "In the Flesh", "Run Like Hell" and "Waiting for the Worms" at The Wall – Live in Berlin concert.
	Francis Buchholz	1990 (died 2026)	bass guitar; backing vocals	Then current members of Scorpions performed "In the Flesh?", "In the Flesh", "Run Like Hell" and "Waiting for the Worms" at The Wall – Live in Berlin concert.
	Herman Rarebell	1990	drums; backing vocals	Then current members of Scorpions performed "In the Flesh?", "In the Flesh", "Run Like Hell" and "Waiting for the Worms" at The Wall – Live in Berlin concert.
	Ute Lemper	1990	lead and backing vocals	Lemper, along with Waters and the Rundfunk Orchestra & Choir, performed "The Thin Ice" in Berlin and also played the Wife on "The Trial".
	Cyndi Lauper	1990	lead and backing vocals; tambourine	Lauper performed on "Another Brick in the Wall (Part 2)" and on "The Tide Is Turning"
	Thomas Dolby	1990	lead vocals; keytar	Dolby performed a Keytar solo on "Another Brick in the Wall (Part 2)" and also played the Schoolmaster on "The Trial"
	Sinéad O'Connor	1990 (died 2023)	lead and backing vocals	O Connor, members of The Band and the Hooters performed on "Mother".
	Rick Danko	1990 (died 1999)	lead and backing vocals	Members of The Band with Sinéad O'Connor and the Hooters performed on "Mother", as well as on "Comfortably Numb" with Van Morrison, Roger Waters, the Band, and the Rundfunk Orchestra & Choir.
	Levon Helm	1990 (died 2012)	lead and backing vocals	Members of The Band with Sinéad O'Connor and the Hooters performed on "Mother", as well as on "Comfortably Numb" with Van Morrison, Roger Waters, the Band, and the Rundfunk Orchestra & Choir.
	Garth Hudson	1990 (died 2025)	accordion; soprano saxophone	Hudson performed a Sax solo on "Another Brick in the Wall (Part 1)" and played accordion alongside The Band bandmates on "Mother".
	Eric Bazilian	1990	guitar	The Hooters played acoustic instruments on "Mother" with Sinéad O'Connor, members of The Band.
	John Lilley	1990	guitar	The Hooters played acoustic instruments on "Mother" with Sinéad O'Connor, members of The Band.
	Rob Hyman	1990	melodica	The Hooters played acoustic instruments on "Mother" with Sinéad O'Connor, members of The Band.
	Fran Smith Jr.	1990	bass guitar	The Hooters played acoustic instruments on "Mother" with Sinéad O'Connor, members of The Band.
	David Uosikkinen	1990	tambourine	The Hooters played acoustic instruments on "Mother" with Sinéad O'Connor, members of The Band.
	Joni Mitchell	1990	vocals	Mitchell and Galway performed "Goodbye Blue Sky" with the Rundfunk Orchestra & Choir. Mitchell also performed on "The Tide Is Turning"
	James Galway	1990	flute	Mitchell and Galway performed "Goodbye Blue Sky" with the Rundfunk Orchestra & Choir. Mitchell also performed on "The Tide Is Turning"
	Bryan Adams	1990	guitar; lead and backing vocals	Adams performed on "Empty Spaces/What Shall We Do Now?" and "Young Lust" alongside Waters and the Rundfunk Orchestra & Choir. He also performed on "The Tide Is Turning"
	Jerry Hall	1990	spoken word	Hall performed the opening monologue on "One of My Turns".
	Van Morrison	1990	lead and backing vocals	Morrison along with Rick Danko and Levon Helm of the Band performed on "Comfortably Numb" with Roger Waters and the Rundfunk Orchestra & Choir. He also performed on "The Tide Is Turning"
	Tim Curry	1990	lead vocals	Curry played the Prosecutor on "The Trial".
	Marianne Faithfull	1990 (died 2025)	lead vocals	Faithfull played the Mother on "The Trial".
	Albert Finney	1990 (died 2019)	lead vocals	Finney played the Judge on "The Trial".
	Bruce Hornsby	1991	lead vocals; keyboard	Hornsby sang on "Comfortably Numb" at Guitar Legends, Seville 1991.
	Mike MacArthur	2000	saxophone	MacArthur played saxophone on 2 June on the In the Flesh tour.
	Ed Calle	2000	saxophone	Calle played saxophone on 3 June.
	Wayne Jackson	2000 (died 2016)	trumpet	Jackson and Love performed on 6 June.
	Andrew Love	2000 (died 2012)	saxophone	Jackson and Love performed on 6 June.
	Tim Gordon	2000	saxophone	Gordon played saxophone on 7 June.
	Shelley Carroll	2000	saxophone	Carroll played saxophone on the 10-11–13 June.
	Don Menza	2000	saxophone	Menza played saxophone on the 16-17–19 June.
	Steve Tavaglione	2000	saxophone	Tavaglione played saxophone on the 21-22–24 June.
	Eric Walton	2000	saxophone	Walton played saxophone on 30 June & 1 July.
	Mark Harris	2000	saxophone	Harris played saxophone on 3 July.
	Steve Eisen	2000	saxophone	Eisen played saxophone on 6 July.
	Nick Mason	2002; 2006; 2007; 2011	drums and percussion (2002, 2007); tambourine (2011)	Former bandmate Mason has made several appearances with Waters. First was in 2002 at Wembley Arena on 26 and 27 June, Next was in 2006 at 12 June show in Iceland, 29 June in Ireland, the 1 July show at Hyde Park in London, the 12 July show in Italy, the 14 July show in France and various dates in 2007 in North America. He also played tambourine on "Outside the Wall" at London O2 show on 12 May 2011 alongside David Gilmour.
	David Gilmour	2011	lead vocals; guitar; mandolin	Other former bandmate Gilmour performed vocals and lead guitar on Comfortably Numb and mandolin on Outside the Wall at London O2 show on 12 May 2011.
	Eddie Vedder	2012; 2017	lead vocals	Vedder sang on Comfortably Numb at Madison Square Garden at the 12:12:12 Hurricane Sandy benefit and later at Chicago United Center on July 24, 2017.
	Sara Watkins	2015	fiddle	Watkins and Helm played with Waters at Newport Folk Festival.
	Amy Helm	2015	lead and backing vocals	Watkins and Helm played with Waters at Newport Folk Festival.

=== Abridged ===
Image	Name	Years active	Instruments	Notes
	Joe Cocker	1990 (died 2014)	vocals	Stewart and Cocker were confirmed to perform in Berlin but were unavailable when the concert date was put back.
	Rod Stewart	1990	vocals	Stewart and Cocker were confirmed to perform in Berlin but were unavailable when the concert date was put back.
	Peter Gabriel	1990	vocals	Gabriel and Springsteen were asked to perform in Berlin but either turned it down or were unavailable.
	Bruce Springsteen	1990	guitar; vocals	Gabriel and Springsteen were asked to perform in Berlin but either turned it down or were unavailable.
	David Gilmour	1990	guitar; vocals	Ex-Pink Floyd bandmates had apparently "been given the legal go-ahead to perform with Roger [in Berlin] but had not been contacted."
	Nick Mason	1990	drums	Ex-Pink Floyd bandmates had apparently "been given the legal go-ahead to perform with Roger [in Berlin] but had not been contacted."
	Rick Wright	1990 (died 2008)	keyboards	Ex-Pink Floyd bandmates had apparently "been given the legal go-ahead to perform with Roger [in Berlin] but had not been contacted."
	Andrew Latimer	2006	guitar; vocals	Latimer, leader of the progressive rock group Camel had auditioned to be lead guitarist and Gilmour's vocal replacement on The Dark Side of the Moon Live tour, but it was felt his voice could not reach the same high notes.
	Michael Lennon	2010	backing vocals	Lennon (of the band Venice) was confirmed to be part of the touring band for The Wall Live tour but with drew due to vocal issues and was replaced his cousin Pat Lennon, also of Venice.

== Line-ups ==
Period	Members	Releases
February – December 1983	Roger Waters – lead vocals, rhythm guitar, bass guitar; Eric Clapton – lead guitar, backing vocals; Andy Bown – Hammond organ, 12-string guitar; Michael Kamen – piano; Andy Newmark – drums, percussion; Ray Cooper – percussion; Raphael Ravenscroft – horns; Kevin Flanagan – horns; Vic Sullivan – horns; David Sanborn – saxophone; Madeline Bell – backing vocals; Katie Kissoon – backing vocals; Doreen Chanter – backing vocals	The Pros and Cons of Hitch Hiking (1984)
June – July 1984	Roger Waters – lead vocals, bass guitar, acoustic guitar; Eric Clapton – lead guitar, backing vocals; Michael Kamen – keyboards; Andy Newmark – drums, percussion; Doreen Chanter – backing vocals; Katie Kissoon – backing vocals; Tim Renwick – rhythm guitar, bass guitar; Mel Collins – saxophone; Chris Stainton – Hammond organ, bass guitar	none – The Pros and Cons of Hitch Hiking (tour) 1984 dates
March – April 1985	Roger Waters – lead vocals, bass guitar, acoustic guitar; Michael Kamen – keyboards; Andy Newmark – drums, percussion; Doreen Chanter – backing vocals; Katie Kissoon – backing vocals; Mel Collins – saxophone; Jay Stapley – lead guitar, backing vocals; Andy Fairweather-Low – rhythm guitar, bass guitar, backing vocals	none – The Pros and Cons of Hitch Hiking (tour) 1985 dates
Winter 1985	Roger Waters – bass guitar, acoustic guitar, vocals; Mel Collins – saxophone; Jay Stapley – guitar; John Gordon – bass guitar; Matt Irving – keyboards, organ; Nick Glennie-Smith – piano, organ; John Lingwood – programming; Freddie Krc – drums, percussion	When the Wind Blows (1986)
Early 1986	Roger Waters – vocals, guitar, bass; Matt Irving – Hammond organ; Nick Glennie-Smith – synthesizers; John Lingwood – drums; Paul Carrack – lead vocals; Katie Kissoon – backing vocals; Doreen Chanter – backing vocals; Madeline Bell – backing vocals; Steve Langer – backing vocals; Vicki Brown – backing vocals	Radio K.A.O.S. (1987) "The Powers That Be" only
October – December 1986	Roger Waters – vocals, acoustic and electric guitars, bass guitar, keyboards, shakuhachi; Katie Kissoon – backing vocals; Doreen Chanter – backing vocals; Madeline Bell – backing vocals; Steve Langer – backing vocals; Vicki Brown – backing vocals; Suzanne Rhatigan – backing vocals; Mel Collins – saxophones; Jay Stapley – lead guitar; Andy Fairweather Low – rhythm guitar; Graham Broad – drums, percussion; Ian Ritchie – piano, keyboards, tenor saxophone, Fairlight programming, drum programming, Cowbell; John Thirkell – trumpet; Peter Thoms – trombone	Radio K.A.O.S. (1987)
August – November 1987	Roger Waters – vocals, bass guitar and acoustic guitar; Mel Collins – saxophone; Andy Fairweather Low – rhythm guitar, bass guitar, backing vocals; Jay Stapley – lead guitar, backing vocals; Paul Carrack – keyboards, vocals; Doreen Chanter – backing vocals; Katie Kissoon – backing vocals; Graham Broad – drums, percussion	None – Radio K.A.O.S. (tour)
July 1990	Roger Waters – vocals, bass guitar, acoustic and rhythm guitar; Andy Fairweather-Low – bass guitar, rhythm guitar, backing vocals; Graham Broad – drums, electronic percussion; Nick Glennie-Smith – keyboards, organ, synthesizers; Rick Di Fonzo – lead guitars; Snowy White – lead and rhythm guitars; Peter Wood – keyboards, organ, synthesizers; Stan Farber – backing vocals, percussion; Joe Chemay – backing vocals; Jim Haas – backing vocals, percussion; John Joyce – backing vocals	The Wall – Live in Berlin (1990)
1991	Roger Waters – lead vocals, acoustic guitar; Andy Fairweather Low – rhythm guitar; Snowy White – lead guitar; Peter Wood – organ, keyboards; Graham Broad – drums; Katie Kissoon – backing vocals; Doreen Chanter – backing vocals; Patrick Leonard – keyboards; Tony Levin – bass	none – Guitar Legends, Seville 1991
1992	Roger Waters – vocals, EMU synthesizer, bass; Andy Fairweather Low – rhythm electric and acoustic guitars; Graham Broad – drums; Katie Kissoon – backing vocals; Doreen Chanter – backing vocals; Patrick Leonard – keyboards, choir arrangement; Jeff Beck – lead guitar; Geoff Whitehorn – "Arpeggio" guitar; Tim Pierce – "Chorus" guitar; Randy Jackson – bass; N'Dea Davenport – backing vocals; Natalie Jackson – backing vocals	"What God Wants, Part I" (1992)
1992	Roger Waters - co-lead vocals, synthesizers; Patrick Leonard - keyboards, speech; Graham Broad – drums; P.P. Arnold – co lead vocals; Marv Albert – commentary; John Dupree – arrangements; B.J. Cole – pedal steel guitar; Steve Lukather – guitar; Rick DiFonso – guitar; Bruce Gaitsch – acoustic guitar; Jimmy Johnson – bass; Brian Macleod – snare, hi-hat; Luis Conte – percussion	"Perfect Sense, Part II" from Amused to Death
1992	Roger Waters – vocals, twelve-string guitar; Patrick Leonard – keyboards, Hammond organ, synthesisers; Tim Pierce – guitar; Jeff Beck – lead guitar (2015 reissue only); John Pierce – bass; Denny Fongheiser – drums; Lynn Fiddmont-Linsey – backing vocals; Natalie Jackson – backing vocals	"The Bravery of Being Out of Range" (1992)
1987–1992 Unknown dates	Roger Waters – vocals, bass guitar, synthesizers, guitar; Patrick Leonard – keyboards; Jeff Beck – guitar (select tracks); Andy Fairweather Low – guitar, backing vocals (select tracks); Geoff Whitehorn – guitar (select tracks); Graham Broad – drums; Luis Conte – percussion; Jimmy Johnson – bass; with other session musicians	Amused to Death (1992) certain tracks
July – August 1999	Roger Waters – vocals, bass guitar, rhythm guitar; Andy Fairweather Low – rhythm guitar, bass guitar, backing vocals; Graham Broad – drums, percussion; P. P. Arnold – vocals, percussion; Katie Kissoon – vocals, percussion; Snowy White – lead and rhythm guitars; Doyle Bramhall II – lead guitar, vocals; Jon Carin – keyboards, lap steel guitar, vocals, acoustic guitar; Andy Wallace – keyboards, backing vocals	none – In the Flesh (tour) 1999 dates
June – July 2000	Roger Waters – vocals, bass guitar, rhythm guitar; Andy Fairweather Low – rhythm guitar, bass guitar, backing vocals; Graham Broad – drums, percussion; P. P. Arnold – vocals, percussion; Katie Kissoon – vocals, percussion; Snowy White – lead and rhythm guitars; Doyle Bramhall II – lead guitar, vocals; Jon Carin – keyboards, lap steel guitar, vocals, acoustic guitar; Andy Wallace – keyboards, backing vocals; Susannah Melvoin - backing vocals, percussion	In the Flesh – Live (2000) – In the Flesh (tour) 2000 dates
February – April 2002	Roger Waters – vocals, bass guitar, rhythm guitar; Andy Fairweather Low – rhythm guitar, bass guitar, backing vocals; Snowy White – lead guitars; Graham Broad – drums, percussion; Harry Waters – keyboards, acoustic guitar; Andy Wallace – keyboards, backing vocals; P. P. Arnold – vocals, percussion; Katie Kissoon – vocals, percussion; Norbert Stachel – saxophone, penny whistle; Chester Kamen – vocals, lead and rhythm guitar; Linda Lewis – backing vocals, percussion	none – In the Flesh (tour) 2002 dates
May – June 2002	Roger Waters – vocals, bass guitar, rhythm guitar; Andy Fairweather Low – rhythm guitar, bass guitar, backing vocals; Snowy White – lead guitars; Graham Broad – drums, percussion; Harry Waters – keyboards, acoustic guitar; Andy Wallace – keyboards, backing vocals; P. P. Arnold – vocals, percussion; Katie Kissoon – vocals, percussion; Norbert Stachel – saxophone, penny whistle; Chester Kamen – lead and rhythm guitar, vocals; Carol Kenyon – backing vocals, percussion	none – In the Flesh (tour) 2002 dates
June 2006 – July 2007	Roger Waters – vocals, bass guitar, acoustic guitar; Andy Fairweather-Low – rhythm guitar, bass, backing vocals; Graham Broad – drums, percussion; Snowy White – lead and rhythm guitar; Harry Waters – Hammond organ, synthesiser, piano; Carol Kenyon – vocals, percussion; Katie Kissoon – vocals, percussion; P. P. Arnold – vocals, percussion; Jon Carin – synthesiser, piano, guitar, lap steel guitar, vocals; Dave Kilminster – lead guitar, vocals and additional bass; Ian Ritchie – saxophone, EWI and additional bass	none – The Dark Side of the Moon Live (tour)
April – May 2008	Roger Waters – vocals, bass guitar, acoustic guitar; Graham Broad – drums and percussion; Snowy White – lead and rhythm guitar; Harry Waters – Hammond organ, synthesiser; Carol Kenyon – vocals, percussion; P. P. Arnold – vocals, percussion; Jon Carin – synthesiser, piano, guitar, lap steel guitar and vocals; Dave Kilminster – lead guitar, vocals, additional bass; Ian Ritchie – saxophone, EWI and additional bass; Chester Kamen – rhythm guitar, bass, backing vocals; Sylvia Mason-James – backing vocals, percussion	none – The Dark Side of the Moon Live (tour)
September 2010 – September 2013	Roger Waters – lead vocals, bass, acoustic guitar, trumpet; Graham Broad – drums, percussion, ukulele; Snowy White – lead and rhythm guitars, bass; Harry Waters – Hammond organ, keyboards, accordion; Jon Carin – keyboards, lap steel guitar, programming, high-strung guitar on, acoustic guitar, electric guitar; Dave Kilminster – lead guitars, bass, banjo; G. E. Smith – rhythm and lead guitars, bass, mandolin; Robbie Wyckoff – lead and backing vocals, percussion; Jon Joyce – backing vocals, percussion; Kipp Lennon – backing vocals, percussion; Mark Lennon – backing vocals, percussion; Pat Lennon – backing vocals, percussion	Roger Waters: The Wall (2014)
July 2015	Roger Waters – vocals, acoustic guitar, piano; G. E. Smith – lead guitar; Jim James – guitar, vocals; Tom Blankenship – bass; Patrick Hallahan – drums; Bo Koster – keyboards, Hammond organ, piano backing vocals; Carl Broemel – guitar, pedal steel, backing vocals; Jess Wolfe – backing vocals; Holly Laessig – backing vocals	none – Newport Folk Festival with My Morning Jacket
September – October 2016	Roger Waters – lead vocals, bass, rhythm guitar; G. E. Smith – bass, rhythm guitar, backing vocals; Jess Wolfe – backing vocals; Holly Laessig – backing vocals; Graham Broad – drums, percussion; Snowy White – lead and rhythm guitar; Harry Waters – Hammond organ, keyboards, accordion; Jon Carin – keyboards, lap steel guitar, programming, guitar, backing vocals; Dave Kilminster – lead guitars, backing vocals; Robbie Wyckoff – lead and backing vocals, percussion	none – Mexico City and Desert Trip concerts
2010–2017	Roger Waters – vocals, acoustic guitar, bass; Jess Wolfe – vocals; Holly Laessig – vocals; Gus Seyffert – guitar, keyboards, bass; Nigel Godrich – guitar, keyboards, sound collages, arrangements; Jonathan Wilson – guitar, keyboards; Roger Joseph Manning Jr. – keyboards; Lee Pardini – keyboards; Joey Waronker – drums	Is This the Life We Really Want? (2017)
May – August 2017	Roger Waters – lead vocals, bass, acoustic and rhythm guitars; Jess Wolfe – vocals, percussion; Holly Laessig – vocals, percussion; Gus Seyffert – rhythm guitars, bass, backing vocals; Jonathan Wilson – lead and rhythm guitars, lead and backing vocals; Joey Waronker – drums, percussion; Dave Kilminster – lead guitars, talk box, backing vocals; Jon Carin – piano, keyboards, programming, lap steel guitar, acoustic and electric rhythm guitars, backing vocals; Drew Erickson – piano, keyboards, Hammond organ; Ian Ritchie – saxophone, bass	none – Us + Them Tour some 2017 shows
September 2017 – 2022	Roger Waters – lead vocals, bass, acoustic and rhythm guitar; Jess Wolfe – vocals, percussion; Holly Laessig – vocals, percussion; Gus Seyffert – rhythm guitars, bass, backing vocals; Jonathan Wilson – lead and rhythm guitars, vocals; Joey Waronker – drums, percussion; Dave Kilminster – lead guitars, talk box, backing vocals; Jon Carin – piano, keyboards, programming, lap steel guitar, rhythm guitars, backing vocals; Ian Ritchie – saxophone, bass; Bo Koster – piano, keyboards, Hammond organ	Roger Waters: Us + Them (2019); The Lockdown Sessions (2022)
2022	Roger Waters – vocals, acoustic and rhythm guitar, piano, bass guitar; Gus Seyffert – bass guitar, rhythm guitar, backing vocals, accordion; Jonathan Wilson – lead and rhythm guitar, backing vocals; Joey Waronker – drums, percussion; Jon Carin – keyboards, rhythm guitar, pedal steel guitar, backing vocals, Marxophone; Dave Kilminster – lead guitar, backing vocals; Ian Ritchie – saxophone, bass; Amanda Belair – vocals, percussion; Shanay Johnson – vocals, percussion; Robert Walter – Hammond B3 organ, keyboards, piano, melodica	The Lockdown Sessions (2022) one track only
June 2022 – present	Roger Waters – vocals, acoustic and rhythm guitar, piano, bass guitar; Jonathan Wilson – lead and rhythm guitar, backing and lead vocals; Gus Seyffert – bass guitar, rhythm guitar, backing vocals, accordion; Joey Waronker – drums, percussion; Jon Carin – keyboards, rhythm guitar, pedal steel guitar, backing vocals, Marxophone; Dave Kilminster – lead guitar, backing vocals; Amanda Belair – vocals, percussion; Shanay Johnson – vocals, percussion; Robert Walter – Hammond B3 organ, keyboards, piano, melodica; Seamus Blake – saxophone, clarinet	Roger Waters: This Is Not a Drill - Live from Prague (2023)
