= Radio K.A.O.S. (tour) =

1987 concert tour by Roger Waters

K.A.O.S. On the Road
- Tour by Roger Waters
- Location: Europe; North America
- Associated album: Radio K.A.O.S.
- Start date: 14 August 1987
- End date: 22 November 1987
- Legs: 2
- No. of shows: 37

Roger Waters concert chronology
- The Pros and Cons of Hitch Hiking (1984–85); K.A.O.S. On the Road (1987); The Wall – Live in Berlin (1990)

K.A.O.S. On the Road was a concert tour performed by the English musician Roger Waters in 1987 in support of his second solo studio album Radio K.A.O.S. (1987).

The shows included material from the album as well as songs from well known Pink Floyd albums such as The Dark Side of the Moon (1973), Wish You Were Here (1975) and The Wall (1979). The tour started in North America on 14 August 1987 and ended on 22 November 1987 with two performances at Wembley Arena in London, England.

The show included designs by Mark Fisher such as circular screens, quadrophonic sounds, back projections and in some cases introductions to the show by radio DJ Jim Ladd. A telephone booth allowed the audience to direct questions at Waters.

== Performers and presentation ==
Unlike The Pros and Cons of Hitch Hiking tour in 1984, the Radio K.A.O.S. tour established The Bleeding Heart Band. A number of these musicians would continue to play or be involved with Roger Waters over the next 20 years. Both Doreen Chanter and Katie Kissoon had performed on the 1984 tour.

Also unlike Waters's previous solo tours (or his last several tours with Pink Floyd), the Radio K.A.O.S. concept and storyline was presented with fan-favourite Pink Floyd material integrated into the set list, rather than dividing the show in two, with the new album played in its entirety and in its precise running order. "Going to Live in L.A.", a b-side to the single "Radio Waves", was also performed, as well as live exclusive "Molly's Song", which was also released as a b-side to the single "Who Needs Information" after the tour.

Some of Waters's older Pink Floyd songs were significantly revamped, with the female backing vocalists taking a more prominent role, Paul Carrack singing David Gilmour's parts in a "blue-eyed soul" style, funk-style bass playing from Andy Fairweather-Low, and saxophone solos added to songs like "Welcome to the Machine".

With a few exceptions, the Pink Floyd songs Waters chose for his set list were those written by him alone, rather than material like "Comfortably Numb", or other songs co-written with David Gilmour or Richard Wright. However, in response to requests from fans using the telephone booth, he promised to include "Comfortably Numb" in future tours.

=== Personnel ===
The band featured:

- Roger Waters – vocals, bass guitar and acoustic guitar
- Andy Fairweather Low – rhythm guitar, bass guitar and backing vocals
- Jay Stapley – lead guitar and backing vocals
- Paul Carrack – keyboards and vocals
- Graham Broad – drums and percussion
- Mel Collins – saxophone
- Doreen Chanter – backing vocals
- Katie Kissoon – backing vocals
- Clare Torry – lead vocals on "The Great Gig in the Sky" on 26 August at Madison Square Garden and on 21 and 22 November at Wembley Arena

== Setlist ==
First set

1. "Tempted" (Paul Carrack solo performance)
2. "Radio Waves"
3. "Welcome to the Machine"
4. "Who Needs Information"
5. "Money"
6. "In the Flesh"
7. "Have a Cigar"
8. "Pigs (Three Different Ones)"
9. "Wish You Were Here"
10. "Mother"
11. "Molly's Song"
12. "Me or Him"
13. "The Powers That Be"

Second set

1. "Going to Live in L.A."
2. "Sunset Strip"
3. "5:01 AM (The Pros and Cons of Hitch Hiking)" (dropped after 6 September)
4. "Get Your Filthy Hands Off My Desert" (added from September 8 onward)
5. "Southampton Dock" (added from September 8 onward)
6. "Arnold Layne" (video "played" by Billy for the audience)
7. "If"
8. "5:06 AM (Every Strangers Eyes)"
9. "Not Now John"
10. "Another Brick in the Wall, Part 1"
11. "The Happiest Days of Our Lives"
12. "Another Brick in the Wall, Part 2"
13. "Nobody Home"
14. "Home"
15. "Four Minutes"
16. "The Tide Is Turning"

Encore

1. "Breathe"
2. "The Great Gig in the Sky" (performed at both Wembley Arena shows and at Madison Square Garden, New York)
3. "Brain Damage"
4. "Eclipse"
5. "Outside the Wall" (performed at The Forum, Inglewood, California)

Note – "In the Flesh", "Have a Cigar", "Pigs (Three Different Ones)" and "Wish You Were Here" were performed as a medley.

== Tour dates ==
List of 1987 concerts
Date	City	Country	Venue	Tickets sold / available	Revenue
14 August	Providence	United States	Providence Civic Center	8,512 / 9,400	$140,448
15 August	Hartford	United States	Hartford Civic Center		
17 August	Vaughan	Canada	Kingswood Music Theatre		
19 August	Cuyahoga Falls	United States	Blossom Music Center		
20 August	Buffalo	United States	Buffalo Memorial Auditorium		
22 August 1987	Mansfield	United States	Great Woods		
24 August	Philadelphia	United States	The Spectrum		
26 August	New York City	United States	Madison Square Garden	16,000 / 16,000	$300,000
28 August	Saratoga Springs	United States	Saratoga Performing Arts Center		
30 August	Landover	United States	Capital Centre		
2 September	Atlanta	United States	The Omni		
4 September	St. Louis	United States	Fox Theatre		
5 September	Indianapolis	United States	Market Square Arena		
6 September	Columbus	United States	Battelle Hall		
8 September	Clarkston	United States	Pine Knob Music Theatre		
9 September	Hoffman Estates	United States	Poplar Creek Music Theater		
10 September	Minneapolis	United States	Met Center		
12 September	Denver	United States	McNichols Sports Arena		
14 September	Austin	United States	Frank Erwin Center	5,275 / 6,091	$77,364
15 September	Dallas	United States	Reunion Arena		
17 September	Phoenix	United States	Arizona Veterans Memorial Coliseum	8,344 / 12,195	$137,676
20 September	Inglewood	United States	The Forum		
23 September	San Diego	United States	San Diego Sports Arena		
26 September	Oakland	United States	Oakland Arena	9,028 / 11,000	$157,990
28 September	Seattle	United States	Seattle Center Arena		
29 September	Vancouver	Canada	Vancouver Expo		
3 November	Portland	United States	Cumberland County Civic Center		
4 November	East Rutherford	United States	Brendan Byrne Arena	13,517 / 14,953	$233,334
6 November	Montreal	Canada	Montreal Forum		
7 November	Quebec City	Canada	Colisée de Québec		
9 November	Ottawa	Canada	Ottawa Civic Centre		
10 November	Hamilton	Canada	Copps Coliseum	8,768 / 10,800	$121,826
13 November	Milwaukee	United States	MECCA Arena		
14 November	Chicago	United States	Arie Crown Theater		
16 November	Worcester	United States	The Centrum	9,212 / 9,274	$161,210
21 November	London	England	Wembley Arena		
22 November	London	England	Wembley Arena		

== Critical reception ==
The Los Angeles Times, "It looks as if Waters is more than willing to leave Floyd’s former mysterioso image to his old bandmates/new rivals--without, of course, letting go of his title as reigning champion and king of rock-as-theater. Even with a show as uneven as this one, it’s a hefty mantle."

The Courier-Post, "Last night's multimedia presentation definitely had its moments and was overall, a far-better-than-average program of rock music. But it nonetheless fell far short of Waters' estimation."
