= The Bleeding Heart Band =

Backing band for Roger Waters

The Bleeding Heart Band was the name English singer-songwriter Roger Waters gave his backing band for a brief period of his post-Pink Floyd solo career.

Although Waters released The Pros and Cons of Hitch Hiking in 1984, and toured as a solo artist promoting that album (with an unnamed supporting band), he was still a member of Pink Floyd, and did not leave the group until late 1985.

The name of the band most likely comes from the phrase "the bleeding hearts and artists" found on the tracks "The Trial" and "Outside the Wall" on Pink Floyd's 1979 double album The Wall (an album which Waters was heavily involved in and wrote most of).

His first music as an ex-member of Pink Floyd was several contributions to the soundtrack to When the Wind Blows. It was for this soundtrack album that the band moniker "The Bleeding-Heart Band" first appeared.

== Personnel ==
The original personnel, from the soundtrack to When the Wind Blows:

- Roger Waters: bass guitar, acoustic guitar, vocals
- Jay Stapley: guitar
- Snowy White: guitar
- John Gordon: bass guitar
- Matt Irving: keyboards, organ
- Nick Glennie-Smith: piano, organ
- John Lingwood: Linn programming
- Freddie Krc: drums, percussion
- Mel Collins: saxophone
- Clare Torry: vocals
- Paul Carrack: keyboards, vocals

The band's membership would change variously as Waters went on to record the Radio K.A.O.S. album, and then mount the tour.

- Roger Waters - vocals, bass guitar and acoustic guitar
- Andy Fairweather-Low - guitar, bass guitar and backing vocals
- Jay Stapley - lead guitar and backing vocals
- Paul Carrack - keyboards and vocals
- Graham Broad - drums and percussion
- Mel Collins - saxophone
- Doreen Chanter - backing vocals
- Katie Kissoon - backing vocals
- Clare Torry - lead vocals on "The Great Gig in the Sky" on just two shows of the tour

== The Wall, Berlin 1990 ==
When The Wall was performed in Berlin in 1990 to raise money for the charity Memorial Fund for Disaster Relief, the show featured an enormous number of international artists, as well as Roger Waters and the Bleeding Heart Band, which acted as the house band for the evening, and provided the music for the extra vocalists.

The Bleeding Heart Band also had a few extra members, such as Rick DiFonzo on guitar, and Peter Wood (reprising his role from the original Pink Floyd live performances of The Wall) on keyboards. Also present was the vocal quartet of Joe Chemay, Jim Farber, Jim Haas, and John Joyce, reprising their role from the studio album and the Pink Floyd Wall performances. Whether the four were considered official members of the Bleeding Heart Band is unknown.

- Rick Di Fonzo – guitars
- Snowy White – guitars
- Andy Fairweather-Low – bass guitar, guitar, backing vocals
- Peter Wood – keyboards, organ, synthesizers
- Nick Glennie-Smith – keyboards, organ, synthesizers
- Graham Broad – drums, electronic percussion
- Stan Farber – backing vocals, percussion (credited as Jim Farber)
- Joe Chemay – backing vocals
- Jim Haas – backing vocals, percussion
- Jon Joyce – backing vocals

== Later years ==
For several years following his 1999–2002 In the Flesh tour, Roger Waters did not use the Bleeding Heart Band name, even though several of the members (such as Broad, Fairweather-Low, and backing vocalist Katie Kissoon) had long been part of his band. For his The Wall Live tour (2010–2013), Waters introduced them as the Bleeding Heart Band once again.

The Wall Tour 2010-13 Band

- Roger Waters – bass, lead vocals, acoustic guitar, trumpet on "Outside the Wall"
- G. E. Smith – guitars, bass, mandolin on "Outside the Wall"
- Dave Kilminster – guitars, banjo on "Outside the Wall", bass on "Mother"
- Snowy White – guitars, bass on "Goodbye Blue Sky"
- Graham Broad – drums, percussion, ukulele on "Outside the Wall"
- Jon Carin – keyboards, lap steel guitar, programming, high-strung guitar on "Comfortably Numb", acoustic guitar on "Outside The Wall", electric guitar on "Run Like Hell", "Bring The Boys Back Home", "Comfortably Numb" and "Another Brick in the Wall, Part 3"
- Harry Waters – Hammond organ, keyboards, accordion on "Outside the Wall"
- Robbie Wyckoff – lead vocals (songs or parts of songs originally sung by David Gilmour), backing vocals, percussion
- Jon Joyce – backing vocals, percussion
- Kipp Lennon – backing vocals, percussion
- Mark Lennon – backing vocals, percussion
- Pat Lennon – backing vocals, percussion
