= The Tide Is Turning =

1987 single by Roger Waters

Single by Roger Waters

from the album Radio K.A.O.S.
- B-side: "Money" (Live) "Get Back to Radio" (Demo) "The Powers That Be"
- Released: 16 November 1987
- Recorded: 1986
- Studio: Billiard Room (London)
- Genre: Progressive rock
- Length: 5:43
- Label: Columbia/CBS (US); EMI (UK)
- Songwriter: Roger Waters
- Producers: Roger Waters; Nick Griffiths

Roger Waters singles chronology
"Sunset Strip" (1987)	"The Tide Is Turning" (1987)	"Who Needs Information" (1987)

Music video
- "The Tide Is Turning" on YouTube

"The Tide Is Turning (After Live Aid)" is the closing track from Roger Waters' second studio album, Radio K.A.O.S. It was released as the album's third single, in November 1987. A live version of the song was released as the second single from Waters' debut live album, The Wall – Live in Berlin in November 1990.

== Background ==
Roger Waters offered his services for the Live Aid concert in 1985 and was turned down by organizer Bob Geldof. The event still inspired Waters to write this song. After he had recorded the Radio K.A.O.S. album, which ended with a simulated nuclear attack in the song "Four Minutes," his record company informed him that the album was too bleak and needed a more upbeat ending. Waters then recorded and added "The Tide Is Turning" to give the album a more optimistic finish.

== Release ==
It was released as a CD single that included a live solo version of the Pink Floyd song "Money", written by Waters for their highly successful studio album The Dark Side of the Moon (1973). It was recorded during Waters' Radio K.A.O.S. Tour, in which he toured the United States and Canada for four months, ending with two dates at Wembley Arena in the UK, in late 1987. It also included an unreleased track that was recorded during the sessions for Radio K.A.O.S. but not used. "Get Back to Radio" (listed as a demo recording, i.e., not a finished track), was originally written to be an album opener, but later scrapped after the story for Radio K.A.O.S. was fully developed. The demo itself does not follow nor reference Billy or the story of Radio K.A.O.S..

== Track listings ==
UK 7" single
No.	Title	Length
1.	"The Tide Is Turning"	5:43
2.	"Money (Live)"	8:41

UK CD / 12" single
No.	Title	Length
1.	"The Tide Is Turning"	5:43
2.	"Money (Live)"	8:41
3.	"Get Back to Radio (Demo)"	4:46

Australia 7" single
No.	Title	Length
1.	"The Tide Is Turning"	5:43
2.	"The Powers That Be"	4:36

== Charts ==
Chart (1987)	Peak position
UK Singles (Official Charts)	54

== Release history ==
Region	Date	Format(s)
United Kingdom	16 November 1987	7" single
United Kingdom	16 November 1987	12" single
United Kingdom	16 November 1987	CD single
Australia	5 December 1987	7" single

== The Wall – Live in Berlin version ==
"The Tide Is Turning (Live in Berlin)"

Single by Roger Waters, with Joni Mitchell, Cyndi Lauper, Bryan Adams, Van Morrison and Paul Carrack

from the album The Wall – Live in Berlin
- B-side: "Nobody Home" (Live in Berlin)
- Released: 19 November 1990
- Recorded: 21 July 1990
- Genre: Progressive rock
- Length: 5:44
- Label: Mercury
- Songwriter: Roger Waters
- Producers: Roger Waters; Nick Griffiths

Roger Waters singles chronology
"Another Brick in the Wall, Part 2 (Live in Berlin)" (1990)	"The Tide Is Turning (Live in Berlin)" (1990)	"What God Wants, Part 1" (1992)

Music video
- "The Tide Is Turning (Live in Berlin)" on YouTube

Waters performed "The Tide Is Turning" with Joni Mitchell, Cyndi Lauper, Bryan Adams, Van Morrison with the Band and Paul Carrack and the Rundfunk Orchestra & Choir in the 1990 concert, The Wall – Live in Berlin. It served as the closing number of Waters' famous 1990 performance of The Wall in Berlin, replacing "Outside the Wall", which is the closing track on The Wall and all of its subsequent tours. Although not shown on the track list of the album, "Outside the Wall" is affixed to the end of "The Tide Is Turning."

=== Reception ===
David Quantick of NME described the song as, "turning a major world event- ie the Berlin Wall coming down- into a minor one. Van Morrison is on this record somewhere, but I'm not as brave as him and I can only hope this record crawls into the bargain bin and rots."

=== Track listings ===
7" single
No.	Title	Length
1.	"The Tide Is Turning"	5:44
2.	"Nobody Home"	4:45

CD / 12" single
No.	Title	Length
1.	"The Tide Is Turning (LP version)"	5:43
2.	"Nobody Home"	4:45
3.	"The Tide Is Turning (7" version)"	5:44

=== Release History ===
Region	Date	Format(s)
Europe	19 November 1990	7" single
Europe	19 November 1990	12" single
Europe	19 November 1990	CD single
