= Every Stranger's Eyes =

Single by Roger Waters

from the album The Pros and Cons of Hitch Hiking
- Released: 11 June 1984
- Recorded: February–December 1983
- Genre: Progressive rock; blues rock
- Length: 4:50
- Label: Harvest Records (UK); Columbia Records (USA)
- Songwriter: Roger Waters
- Producers: Roger Waters; Michael Kamen

Roger Waters singles chronology
"The Pros and Cons of Hitch Hiking" (1984)	"Every Stranger's Eyes" (1984)	"Radio Waves" (1987)

Music video
- "Every Stranger's Eyes" on YouTube

"Every Stranger's Eyes", also known as "5:06AM (Every Strangers Eyes)", is a song written, produced, and performed by English musician Roger Waters from his debut studio album, The Pros and Cons of Hitch Hiking. It was released worldwide as the album's second single on 11 June 1984.

== Background ==
The song tells the story of the hitch hiking dreams of the album's main character Reg and how he finds camaraderie in the eyes of strangers during his travels.

== Track listings ==
7" single
No.	Title	Length
1.	"Every Stranger's Eyes"	4:57
2.	"4:56AM (For the First Time Today, Part 1)"	2:56

== Critical reception ==
Kurt Loder of Rolling Stone wrote, "The protagonist of the piece, a man not unlike Waters himself, finds redemption in a diner, a new love and even Cause for Hope. In the best hippie tradition, he comes to "recognise myself in every stranger's eyes.""
