= Guitar Legends, Seville 1991 =

Guitar Legends was a concert held over five nights, from October 15 to October 19, 1991, in Seville, Spain, with the aim of positioning the city as an entertainment destination to draw support for Expo '92 beginning the following April.

== The show ==
The event featured 27 top guitarists, including Brian May, B. B. King, George Benson, Joe Walsh, Keith Richards, Les Paul, Robbie Robertson, Robert Cray, Roger Waters, Albert Collins, Steve Vai, Jack Bruce and Joe Satriani. The vocalists included Rickie Lee Jones, Bob Dylan and Joe Cocker.

The event was conceived by British impresario and producer Tony Hollingsworth who originally agreed to stage the concert as a co-production deal with Spanish state television RTVE. But RTVE dropped out on the day the contract was due to be signed when the director-general (and film director) Pilar Miro Romero left the company.

Later, the organisers of Expo '92 took on the project to help overcome the problem that Seville was being seen merely as a civil engineering project. They provided half the $7.2 million budget, with Hollingsworth raising the rest from television pre-sales. RTVE bought the Spanish rights, but paid by providing television and radio airtime for advertising slots. These were then sold to Coca-Cola.

Five 90-minute shows and a one-hour documentary were broadcast. Forty-five countries showed at least one live show. Later, broadcasters in 105 countries broadcast one or more programmes.

Rights in the event are held by Tribute Inspirations Limited.

== Artists appearing at Guitar Legends ==
=== Guitarists ===
- Albert Collins
- B. B. King
- Bo Diddley
- Brian May
- Dave Edmunds
- George Benson
- Joe Walsh
- Joe Satriani
- John McLaughlin
- Keith Richards
- Larry Coryell
- Les Paul
- Nuno Bettencourt
- Paco De Lucia
- Phil Manzanera
- Richard Thompson
- Robbie Robertson
- Robert Cray
- Roger Waters
- Roger McGuinn
- Steve Cropper
- Steve Vai
- Vicente Amigo

=== Vocalists ===
- Bob Dylan
- Gary Cherone
- Joe Cocker
- Miguel Bosé
- Paul Rodgers
- Rickie Lee Jones

=== Backing musicians ===
- Andy Fairweather-Low
- Bill Dillon
- Billy Nicholls
- Bo Dollis
- Brandon Fields
- Bryan Simpson
- Charley Drayton
- China Gordon
- Chris Thompson
- Chris Stainton
- Chuck Leavell
- Cleveland Watkiss
- Cozy Powell
- David Hull
- Debby Hastings
- Dennis Chambers
- Deric Dyer
- Dominique Di Piazza
- Doreen Chanter
- Everette Harp
- Gary Mazaroppi
- George Bohanon
- George Duke
- Graham Broad
- Ivan Neville
- Jack Bruce
- John Miles
- John Leftwich
- John David
- Katie Kissoon
- Kevin Dillon
- Larry Kimpel
- Louis Orapollo
- Maggie Ryder
- Manu Katche
- Miami Horns
- Mike Moran
- Miriam Stockley
- Monk Boudreaux
- Nathan East
- Neil Murray
- Pat Leonard
- Peter Wood
- Pino Palladino
- Ray Cooper
- Ray Brown
- Richard Cousins
- Rick Wakeman
- Robert Smith
- Sal Demandi
- Simon Phillips
- Snowy White
- Stanley Clarke
- Steve Jordan
- Steve Ferrone
- Terry Williams
- Tony Levin
- Trilok Gurtu
