= Radio Waves (Roger Waters song) =

Single by Roger Waters

from the album Radio K.A.O.S.
- B-side: "Going to Live in L.A."
- Released: 18 May 1987
- Recorded: 1986
- Studio: Billiard Room (London)
- Length: 4:59 (album version); 3:47 (single version); 6:58 (extended version)
- Label: Columbia/CBS (US); EMI (UK)
- Songwriter: Roger Waters
- Producers: Roger Waters; Ian Ritchie; Nick Griffiths

Roger Waters singles chronology
| "Every Stranger's Eyes" (1984) | "Radio Waves" (1987) | "Sunset Strip" (1987) |

Music video
- "Radio Waves" on YouTube

"Radio Waves" is the opening track from Roger Waters' second solo studio album, Radio K.A.O.S. It was chosen as the lead single for the album, released worldwide on 18 May 1987.

== Background ==
"Radio Waves" introduces the main character, Billy, a disabled man who finds a way to talk and become friends with a radio disc jockey (DJ). Billy is gifted and has the miracle of hearing and interpreting radio waves in his head. He explores a cordless telephone which was hidden in his wheelchair by his brother Benny, after destroying and robbing a store. Recognising its similarity to a radio, he experiments with the phone and is able to access computers and speech synthesizers, he learns to speak through them. He calls a radio station named Radio KAOS, a completely fictitious radio station based in Los Angeles, California, and tells them of his abilities and his life story throughout the album.

== Track listings ==
US 7" single
| No. | Title | Length |
|---|---|---|
| 1. | "Radio Waves (Edit)" | 4:13 |
| 2. | "Going to Live in L.A." | 5:50 |

International 7" single
| No. | Title | Length |
|---|---|---|
| 1. | "Radio Waves" | 3:47 |
| 2. | "Going to Live in L.A." | 5:50 |

CD / 12" single
| No. | Title | Length |
|---|---|---|
| 1. | "Radio Waves (Extended Remix)" | 6:58 |
| 2. | "Going to Live in L.A." | 5:50 |
| 3. | "Radio Waves (7" Version)" | 3:47 |

Mainstream promotional single
| No. | Title | Length |
|---|---|---|
| 1. | "Radio Waves (Edit)" | 4:13 |
| 2. | "Radio Waves (Single Version)" | 3:47 |

== Charts ==
| Chart (1987) | Peak position |
|---|---|
| Australia (Kent Music Report) | 43 |
| UK Singles (OCC) | 74 |
| US Album Rock Tracks (Billboard) | 12 |
