= Sunset Strip (song) =

Single by Roger Waters

from the album Radio K.A.O.S.
- B-side: "The Tide Is Turning"; "Money" (Live); "Get Back to Radio (Demo)"
- Released: 12 September 1987
- Recorded: 1986
- Studio: Billiard Room (London)
- Length: 4:45 (Album Version); 4:06 (Single Version)
- Label: Columbia/CBS (US); EMI (UK)
- Songwriter: Roger Waters
- Producers: Roger Waters; Ian Ritchie; Nick Griffiths

Roger Waters singles chronology
"Radio Waves" (1987)	"Sunset Strip" (1987)	"The Tide Is Turning" (1987)

Alternative covers
- American single cover

Music video
- "Sunset Strip" on YouTube

"Sunset Strip" is a song written by the English musician and singer-songwriter Roger Waters for his second solo studio album, Radio K.A.O.S. (1987). It was placed as the fifth track on the record. It was also released as the album's second single, on 12 September 1987.

== Background ==
Billy is a young man with a disability. He uses a wheelchair and is thought to be incapable of speech. However, Billy is highly intelligent and gifted, and can hear radio waves in his head. He begins to explore the cordless telephone, recognising its similarity to a radio. He experiments with a phone which his brother, Benny, now in prison, hid in his wheelchair after burgling an electronics shop. Through it Billy is able to access computers and speech synthesisers and learns to speak through them. He calls a radio station in Los Angeles, California, named "Radio KAOS" and tells the disc jockey (DJ) of his life story. "Sunset Strip" is about Billy's sister-in-law, Molly not being able to cope and sending him to L.A. to live with his uncle Dave. During the song Billy expresses his longing for home and the song mentions various things associated with Wales, such as the Red Dragon, male voice choirs, the land of his fathers and the Black Fields.

== Track listings ==
12" single
No.	Title	Length
1.	"Sunset Strip"	4:06
2.	"Money (Live)"	6:28
3.	"Get Back to Radio (Demo)"	4:46

US, Europe and Australian 7" single
No.	Title	Length
1.	"Sunset Strip"	4:06
2.	"Money (Live)"	6:28

South African 7" single
No.	Title	Length
1.	"Sunset Strip"	4:06
2.	"The Tide Is Turning (After Live Aid)"	5:43

== Charts ==
Chart (1987)	Peak position
US Album Rock Tracks (Billboard)	15

== See also ==
- Sunset Strip – known for its boutiques, restaurants, rock clubs, and nightclubs, as well as its array of huge, colourful billboards.
