= The Pros and Cons of Hitch Hiking (song) =

- Brazilian Promotional single cover

Single by Roger Waters

from the album The Pros and Cons of Hitch Hiking
- B-side: "Apparently They Were Travelling Abroad"
- Released: 9 April 1984
- Recorded: February–December 1983
- Genre: Progressive rock; blues rock
- Length: 5:22 (Single edit); 4:36 (Album version)
- Label: Harvest Records (UK); Columbia Records (USA)
- Songwriter: Roger Waters
- Producers: Roger Waters; Michael Kamen

Roger Waters singles chronology
"The Pros and Cons of Hitch Hiking" (1984)	"Every Stranger's Eyes" (1984)

Music video
- "The Pros and Cons of Hitch Hiking" on YouTube

"The Pros and Cons of Hitch Hiking" (also known as "5:01AM (The Pros and Cons of Hitch Hiking, Pt. 10)", is a song written and performed by Roger Waters from his debut studio album, The Pros and Cons of Hitch Hiking. It was released worldwide as the album's first single on 9 April 1984.

== Background ==
Its meaning consists of the lasting memories of the main character Reg, and displays the benefits and problems associated with his hitchhiking, both figuratively and metaphorically. During the song, Waters mentions such popular icons as Dick Tracy, Shane and Yoko Ono. Waters has said the inclusion of Yoko Ono in the song comes from a dream his drummer Andy Newmark had.

== Track listings ==
7" single
No.	Title	Length
1.	"The Pros and Cons of Hitch Hiking"	4:35
2.	"Apparently They Were Travelling Abroad"	3:22

International 12" single
No.	Title	Length
1.	"The Pros and Cons of Hitch Hiking"	5:25
2.	"For the First Time Today, Part 2"	2:21
3.	"For the First Time Today, Part 1"	1:36

US and Europe 12" single
No.	Title	Length
1.	"The Pros and Cons of Hitch Hiking"	5:25
2.	"Apparently They Were Travelling Abroad / Running Shoes"	6:26

== Charts ==
Chart (1984)	Peak position
Australia (Kent Music Report)	30
UK Singles (OCC)	74
US Mainstream Rock Songs (Billboard)	17
The Netherlands	16
