= Radio K.A.O.S. =

Studio album by Roger Waters
- Released: 15 June 1987
- Recorded: October – December 1986
- Studio: Billiard Room (London)
- Genres: New wave; electronic rock; art rock
- Length: 41:24
- Labels: EMI; Columbia
- Producers: Roger Waters; Ian Ritchie; Nick Griffiths

Roger Waters chronology
When the Wind Blows (1986)	Radio K.A.O.S. (1987)	The Wall – Live in Berlin (1990)

Roger Waters studio chronology
The Pros and Cons of Hitch Hiking (1984)	Radio K.A.O.S. (1987)	Amused to Death (1992)

Singles from Radio K.A.O.S.
- 1. "Radio Waves" Released: 18 May 1987; 2. "Sunset Strip" Released: 12 September 1987; 3. "The Tide Is Turning (After Live Aid)" Released: 16 November 1987; 4. "Who Needs Information" Released: 21 December 1987

Radio K.A.O.S. is the second solo studio album by the English singer-songwriter Roger Waters. Released on 15 June 1987 in the United Kingdom and 16 June in the United States, it was Waters' first solo studio album after his formal departure from the band Pink Floyd in 1985. Like his previous and future studio albums and many works of his during his time with Pink Floyd, the album is a concept album, based on a number of key topical subjects of the late 1980s, including monetarism and its effect on citizens, popular culture of the time, and the events and consequences of the Cold War. It also makes criticisms of Margaret Thatcher's government, much like Pink Floyd's The Final Cut (1983), another album conceived by Waters.

The album follows Billy, a mentally and physically disabled man from Wales, forced to live with his uncle David in Los Angeles after his brother Benny is sent to prison following an act intended to support striking coal miners which results in the death of a taxi driver, and his dismissal from his mining job due to "market forces". The album explores Billy's view of the world through an on-air conversation between him and Jim, a disc jockey (DJ) at a fictitious local radio station named Radio KAOS.

== Background and inspiration ==
In 1979, Waters met American disc jockey Jim Ladd for a radio documentary on The Wall album, beginning a friendship which remained until Ladd's death in 2023. Ladd was an inspiration as he brought some light into Waters's dim view of L.A. life, initially through listening to the bizarre Fish Report from KMET. Waters became increasingly interested in Ladd's plight with his radio station KMET, and his eventual sacking to change the programming format of the station in search of market-researched profits. In 1985, Waters wrote a song called "Get Back to Radio," which seemed to be partly based on the experiences of Ladd, and partly from childhood memories – Waters fondly remembers listening to Radio Luxembourg well into the night as a child.

An event from the 1985 miners' strike in Britain where a striking worker threw a concrete block off a motorway bridge, killing a taxi driver who was taking a strikebreaker to his job, seemed to register in Waters's subconscious, emerging in the second song written, "Who Needs Information" and later, "Me or Him." The album, with a working title of Home, took only three months to record, developed from 16 songs throughout 1986 and was worked into a now familiar Waters concept album.

The Ronald Reagan campaign advertisements during "Me or Him" are sampled from an actual 1980 political advertisement of Reagan's.

== Concept ==
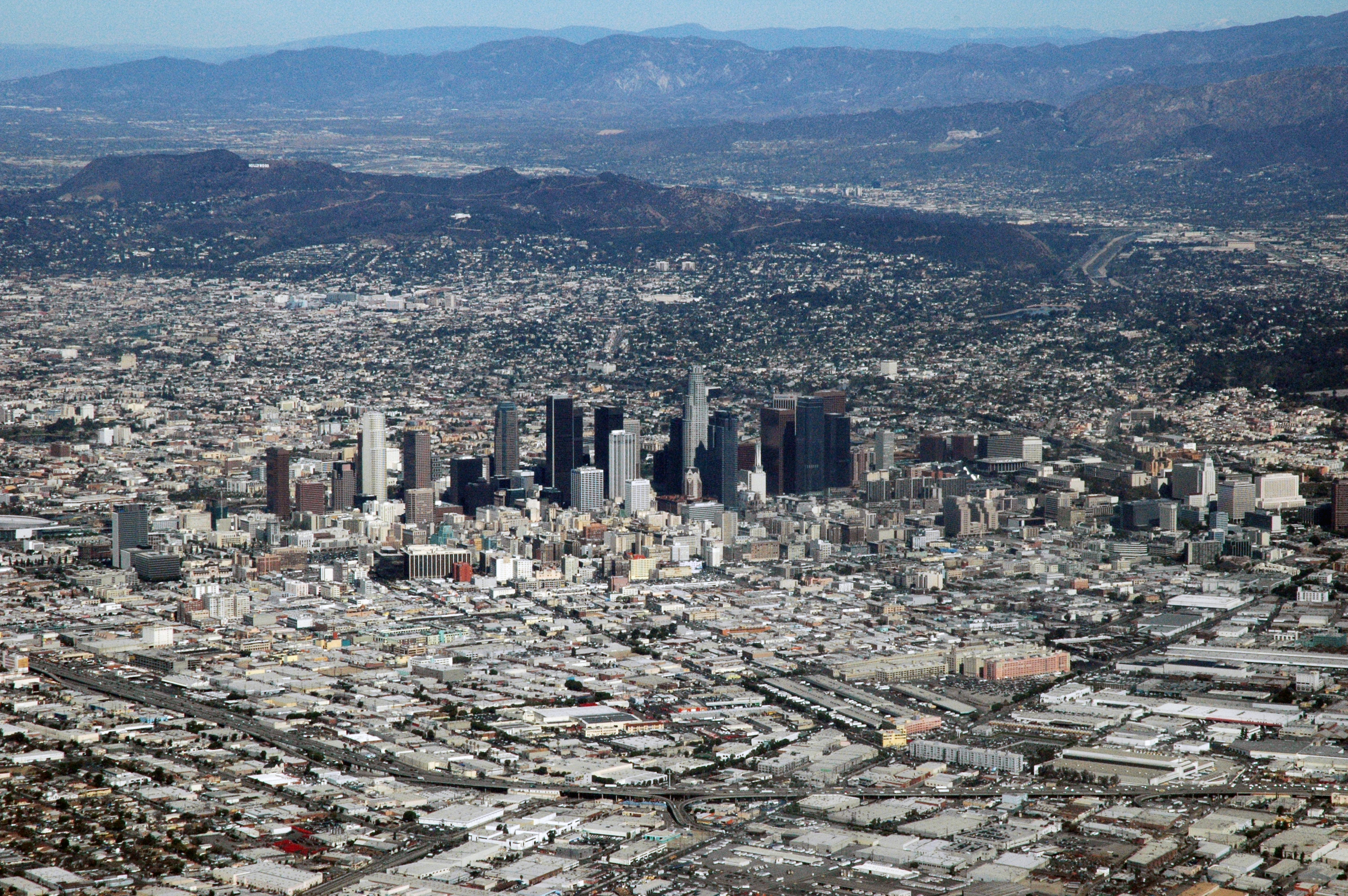
The popular culture of Los Angeles and the radio industry in the area at the time was the inspiration for the fictional Radio KAOS station that plays a significant role in the album.

Billy is a 23-year-old Welshman from the South Wales Valleys. He is mentally and physically disabled as a result of cerebral palsy, uses a wheelchair and is only able to work his upper body. Though he is perceived as mentally challenged, his disability has actually made him not only a genius, but also superhuman, as he also has the ability to literally hear radio waves throughout all frequencies without aid.

Billy was living with his twin brother Benny, who was a coal miner, wife Molly, and their children. Unfortunately, Benny has lost his job in the mines due to the "market forces." One night, Benny and Billy are out on a pub crawl when they pass a shop full of TV screens broadcasting Margaret Thatcher's "mocking condescension." Benny vents his anger on this shop and steals a cordless phone. Next, drunk and looking for fun, Benny poses on a footbridge and considers dropping a cinder block on the passing cars, but they decide against it ("Who Needs Information" - track 2). Later the same night, someone is killed by a concrete block dropped from a similar bridge by Benny ("Me or Him" – track 3). The police question Benny, who hides the phone in Billy's wheelchair.

Benny is taken to prison, and Molly, unable to cope, sends Billy to live with his uncle David in Los Angeles, California, United States. Since Billy can hear radio waves in his head ("Radio Waves" – track 1), he begins to explore the cordless phone, recognising its similarity to a radio. He experiments with the phone and is able to access computers and speech synthesizers, and learns to speak through them. He calls a radio station in L.A. named Radio K.A.O.S. and tells them of his life story about his brother being in jail ("Me or Him" – track 3), about his sister-in-law not being able to cope and sending him to L.A. to live with his uncle Dave ("Sunset Strip" – track 5).

Billy eventually hacks into a military satellite and fools the world into thinking nuclear ICBMs are about to hit major cities all over the world while deactivating the military's power to retaliate ("Home" – track 6, and "Four Minutes" – track 7). The album concludes with a song about how everyone, in thinking they were about to die, realises that the fear and competitiveness peddled by the mass media is much less important than their love for family and the larger community. ("The Tide Is Turning" – track 8).

In the sleeve notes, Waters dedicated the album "to all those who find themselves at the violent end of monetarism."

== Recording ==
The album was recorded at Waters' own personal studio in London called The Billiard Room and mixed at Odyssey Studios in London.

Recording was done with the aid of Roger Waters' backing band the Bleeding Heart Band.

== Release ==
=== Packaging ===
Morse code is a central theme in the art and style of the album, visually and audibly. The artwork for the album, designed by Kate Hepburn, are written Morse code sentences in green imprinted on a black background. The translation spans both the front and the back of the sleeve. The front cover reads ROGER/WATERS/RADIO/KAOS/WHONE/EDSINF/ORMA/TIONTH. The back cover reads EPOWE/RSTHAT/BEHO/METHETI/DEISTU/RNING/RADIO/WAVES. When translated as a whole, the artwork spells out the name of the artist, the album, and five tracks from the album. It reads: Roger Waters, Radio K.A.O.S., "Who Needs Information," "The Powers That Be," "Home," "The Tide Is Turning" and "Radio Waves." The code on the artwork is also heard throughout the album itself, most notably at the beginning and end of the album, book-ending the piece in the same manner as the heartbeat from Pink Floyd's The Dark Side of the Moon (1973) and the Bleeding Heart Band from The Wall (1979).

=== Singles ===
Aside from eight songs that were used on the released album, additional songs appeared as B-sides.

The lead single from the album, "Radio Waves", was released on 11 May 1987 as a 7" single, a 12" extended play single, and a CD single. The b-side was a non-album track called "Going to Live in L.A.". "Radio Waves" briefly went into both the American and British charts in the month of release, reaching No. 74 on the UK singles chart and No. 12 on the US Billboard Mainstream Rock chart.

"Sunset Strip" was released as the second single in September 1987. The B-side included a demo of the song "Get Back to Radio" and a live version of Pink Floyd's "Money". Despite "Sunset Strip" not being released as a promo to American and British radio stations, and competing against Waters's former band whose single "Learning to Fly" was topping the US Billboard Mainstream Rock chart, it managed to go as high as No. 15.

"The Tide Is Turning" was released as the third single in the United Kingdom and Australia. Without direct competition from Waters's former band, Pink Floyd, the single was a small commercial success in Europe. It peaked at No. 54 on the UK singles chart.

"Who Needs Information?" was released in the United States in December 1987 as the fourth and final single, backed with the live exclusive "Molly's Song", another previously unreleased song. The single was in direct competition with Pink Floyd's "On the Turning Away". While Pink Floyd's singles topped the US Mainstream Rock charts back to back, "Who Needs Information?" failed to chart, despite a radio promotional release.

Waters even once said in an interview that he might even release an EP with some unreleased songs from this project for those who might be interested, but this never appeared.

== Promotion ==
The record was first announced via a press release from EMI on 6 April 1987, confirming Waters's new album, its details and release date. The press release mentioned that the project was conceived to be a full-out rock opera, complete with a stage show, film and live album, much like Waters's original vision for the album.

Waters also made a Video EP for this album featuring the songs "Radio Waves," "Sunset Strip," "Fish Report," "Four Minutes" and "The Tide Is Turning (After Live Aid)."

=== Tour ===
The Radio K.A.O.S. tour aka K.A.O.S. On the Road ran from mid-August 1987 to the end of November of the same year. It was entirely in North America except for the final two shows from Wembley, England. The tour, the largest of Waters's career up to that point, featured extravagant staging, props and video. The entirety of the concert was presented as a K.A.O.S. radio special, "K.A.O.S. on the Road", and featured disc jockey (DJ) Jim Ladd introducing the songs, conversing with Billy, or simply complimenting Waters and the band on their performance. The screen used for the tour displayed video of Waters, Ladd, and various other actors playing out aspects of the narrative, as well as animations and video illustrating the songs. The concert was 'interrupted' at one point each night by Billy, who played the video to the début Pink Floyd single "Arnold Layne", in remembrance of Syd Barrett.

Prior to each show, Jim Ladd took calls from people in a booth and these calls were then answered by Waters. The person in each booth was usually chosen via a competition on local radio stations, in keeping with the theme of the concert. The setlist included the entire Radio K.A.O.S. album, with popular Waters-composed Pink Floyd songs mixed into the sequence, and typically lasted more than two and a half hours.

The tour went heavily into debt and Waters used his own money at one point to underwrite the expense, as there were massive overruns and delays. The tour was proposed to go worldwide, but due to financial considerations these discussions never went any further, and the tour ended.

== Critical reception ==
Professional ratings
Review scores
Source	Rating
AllMusic	3.5/5 stars
Los Angeles Times	2.5/4 stars
The Rolling Stone Album Guide	3/5 stars
The Village Voice	B

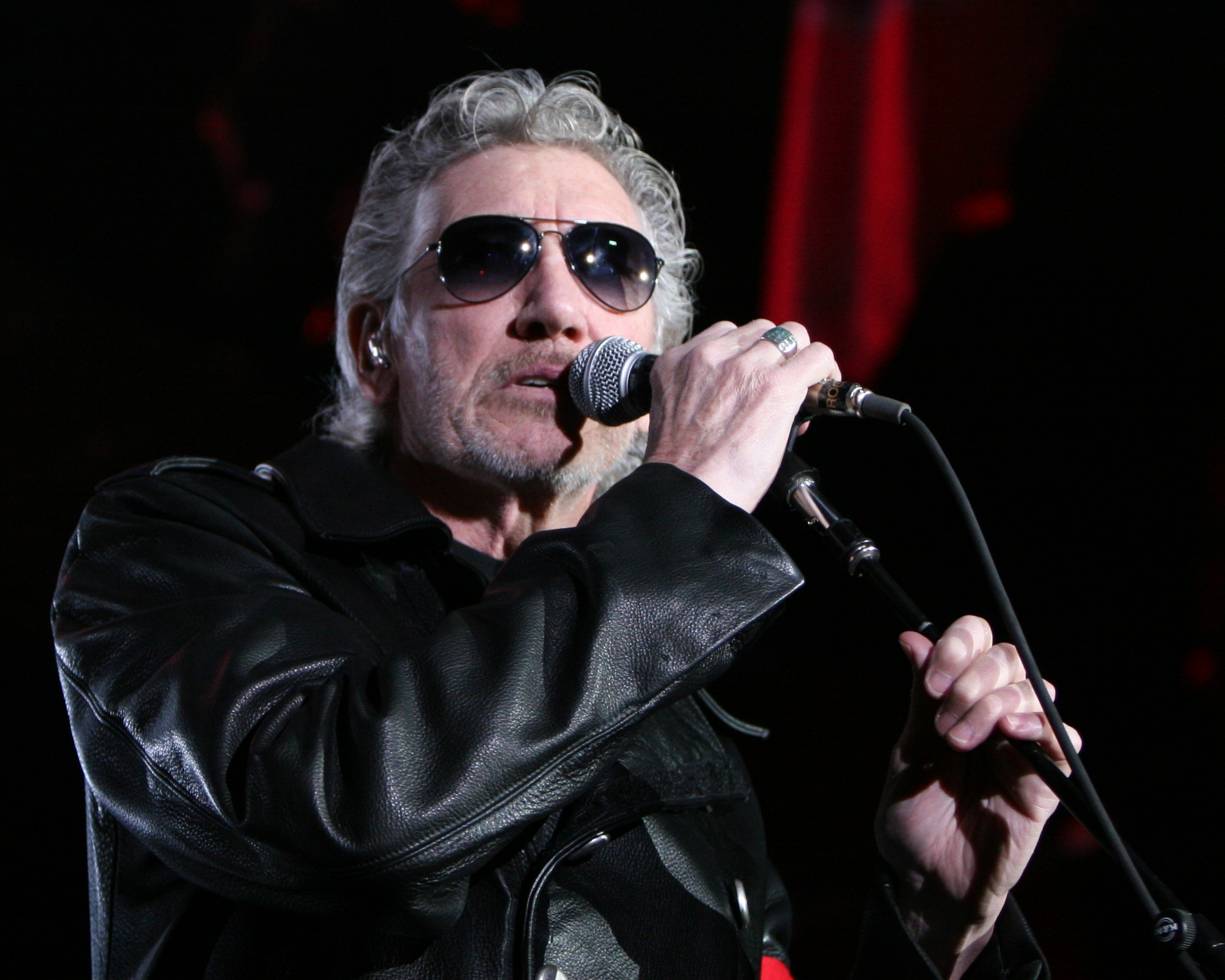
Waters felt a moral disappointment with the album, even going as far as saying he regrets recording it.

Released on 15 June 1987 in the United Kingdom and the United States, the album was met with mixed reviews. It peaked at number 25 in the United Kingdom, 33 in Australia, and 50 in the United States.

J. D. Considine of Rolling Stone magazine gave a positive review, describing the album as "by no means perfect" but "powerful". Although the themes and style of the album were criticised, he deemed it an improvement on its predecessor The Pros and Cons of Hitch Hiking (1984).

Robert Christgau from The Village Voice wrote: "In which Waters's wheelchair-bound version of the deaf, dumb and blind boy learns to control the world's computers with his cordless phone, then simulates impending nuclear holocaust just to scare the shit out of the powers that be. I have serious reservations about any record that can't be enjoyed unless you sit there reading the inner sleeve, but this is not without its aural rewards – a coverable song or two and some nice comping on shakuhachi, as well as the deep engineering that made Floyd famous. As pretentious goes, not stupid."

Waters has since expressed dislike for the album and the effort of creating it. "Between Ian Ritchie and myself, we really fucked that record up," he remarked. "We tried too hard to make it sound modern. Also, the part where Billy pretends that he's just started the Third World War I now find faintly embarrassing. And I dislike the backing vocals on 'The Tide Is Turning'."

In addition to being dissatisfied with the production, Waters regretted trimming the album from a double to a single one, thus losing much of the concept.

In a retrospective review, Mike DeGagne of AllMusic gave the album three-and-a-half stars, stating that, unlike some of Waters's other works, it conveys the music more than the narrative, but "while both The Pros and Cons of Hitch Hiking and Amused to Death convey his talented use of concept, imagination, and lyrical mastery, this album seems to be nothing more than a fictional tale with a blatantly apparent message".

== Track listing ==
All tracks are written by Roger Waters.

No.	Title	Length
1.	"Radio Waves"	4:58
2.	"Who Needs Information"	5:55
3.	"Me or Him"	5:23
4.	"The Powers That Be"	4:36
5.	"Sunset Strip"	4:45
6.	"Home"	6:00
7.	"Four Minutes"	4:00
8.	"The Tide Is Turning (After Live Aid)"	5:43
Total length:		41:24

=== Original Vinyl Pressing (1987) ===
Side one (KAOS 1 A)
No.	Title	Length
1.	"Radio Waves"	5:05
2.	"Who Needs Information"	5:49
3.	"Me or Him"	5:24
4.	"The Powers That Be" (Song ends with dog barking three times)	4:03
Total length:		20:21

Side two (KAOS 1 B)
No.	Title	Length
1.	"Sunset Strip" (Three barks and radio broadcast start the song on this release)	4:03
2.	"Home"	6:59
3.	"Four Minutes"	3:39
4.	"The Tide Is Turning (After Live Aid)"	5:44
Total length:		20:25

== Personnel ==
Credits are adapted from the Radio K.A.O.S. liner notes.

- Roger Waters – vocals; acoustic and electric guitars; bass guitar; keyboards; shakuhachi
- Ian Ritchie – piano; keyboards; tenor saxophone; Fairlight CMI programming; drum machine programming; cowbell
- Graham Broad – percussion; drums
- Mel Collins – saxophones
- Andy Fairweather Low – electric guitars
- Jay Stapley – electric guitars
- Suzanne Rhatigan – main backing vocals on "Radio Waves", "Me or Him", "Sunset Strip" and "The Tide Is Turning (After Live Aid)"
- John Thirkell – trumpet
- Peter Thoms – trombone
- Katie Kissoon, Doreen Chanter, Madeline Bell, Steve Langer and Vicki Brown – backing vocals on "Who Needs Information", "The Powers That Be" and "Radio Waves"
- Clare Torry – lead vocals on "Home" and "Four Minutes"
- Paul Carrack – lead vocals on "The Powers That Be"
- Nick Glennie-Smith – DX7 and E-mu Emulator on "Powers That Be"
- Matt Irving – Hammond organ on "The Powers That Be"
- John Lingwood – drums on "The Powers That Be"
- Pontarddulais Male Voice Choir – chorus
- Paul Batchelor – assistant engineer
- Noel Davis – choir master
- Nick Griffiths – co-producer on "Me or Him" and "The Powers That Be"
- Kate Hepburn – cover design
- Eric Jones – choir arrangement
- Chris Sheldon – engineer
- Kevin Whyte – assistant engineer

== Charts ==
Chart (1987)	Peak position
Australia (Kent Music Report)	33
UK Albums Chart	25
US Billboard 200	50

== Certifications ==
Region	Certification	Certified units/sales
Canada (Music Canada)	Gold	50,000^{^}
United Kingdom (BPI)	Silver	60,000^{^}
^{^} Shipments figures based on certification alone.

== Release history ==
Region	Date	Format	Label	Catalog no.
Argentina	15 June 1987	LP	Columbia Records	120,935
Australia	15 June 1987	LP, CD	CBS Records	450518 1 (LP); 450518 2 (CD)
Brazil	15 June 1987	LP, CD	CBS Records	230,506 (LP); 2 040795 (CD)
Canada	15 June 1987	LP, CD	Columbia Records	FC 40795 (LP); VCK-40795 (CD)
France	15 June 1987	LP, CD	EMI	2407831 (LP); CDKAOS1 (CD, Issue 1); CDP 7 46865 2 (CD, Issue 2)
West Germany	15 June 1987	LP, CD	EMI	064 24 0783 1 (LP); CDKAOS1 (CD, Issue 1); CDP 7 46865 2 (CD, Issue 2)
Greece	15 June 1987	LP, CD	EMI	062-240783 (LP); CDKAOS1 (CD, Issue 1); CDP 7 46865 2 (CD, Issue 2)
Israel	15 June 1987	LP	Columbia Records	KAOS 1-1
Italy	15 June 1987	LP, CD	EMI	64-2407831 (LP); CDKAOS1 (CD, Issue 1); CDP 7 46865 2 (CD, Issue 2)
Japan	15 June 1987	LP	CBS Records / Sony Records	28 AP 3361
New Zealand	15 June 1987	LP, CD	CBS Records	450518 1 (LP); 450518 2 (CD)
South Africa	15 June 1987	LP	CBS Records	ASF 3161
Spain	15 June 1987	LP, CD	EMI	074 240783 1(LP); CDKAOS1 (CD, Issue 1); CDP 7 46865 2 (CD, Issue 2)
Turkey	15 June 1987	LP	EMI	KENT PR 2215
United Kingdom	15 June 1987	LP, CD, Cassette	EMI	KAOS 1 (LP); CDKAOS1 (CD, Issue 1); CDP 7 46865 2 (CD, Issue 2); TC KAOS 1 (CT)
United States	15 June 1987	LP, CD	Columbia Records	FC 40795 (LP); CK 40795 (CD)
Yugoslavia	15 June 1987	LP, CD	Jugoton, EMI	11170 (LP); CDKAOS1 (CD, Issue 1); CDP 7 46865 2 (CD, Issue 2); CAEMI 9263 (MC)
Worldwide	10 January 2003	Digital download	EMI, Columbia	n/a
Europe	14 January 2003	CD	Columbia Records	509591 2
Japan	1 March 2005	CD	Sony Music Entertainment Japan	MHCP 692
