= The Pros and Cons of Hitch Hiking =

Studio album by Roger Waters
- Released: 30 April 1984
- Recorded: February–December 1983
- Studios: Olympic (London); Eel Pie (London); The Billiard Room (London)
- Genres: Progressive rock; blues rock
- Length: 42:14
- Labels: Harvest; Columbia
- Producers: Roger Waters; Michael Kamen

Roger Waters chronology
Music from The Body (1970)	The Pros and Cons of Hitch Hiking (1984)	When the Wind Blows (1986)

Roger Waters studio chronology
The Pros and Cons of Hitch Hiking (1984)	Radio K.A.O.S. (1987)

Singles from The Pros and Cons of Hitch Hiking
- 1. "The Pros and Cons of Hitch Hiking" Released: 9 April 1984; 2. "Every Stranger's Eyes" Released: 11 June 1984

Professional ratings
Review scores
Source	Rating
AllMusic	4/5 stars
Rolling Stone	1/5 stars
The Rolling Stone Album Guide	2/5 stars
Sputnikmusic	4/5

The Pros and Cons of Hitch Hiking is the debut solo studio album by Roger Waters, bassist/songwriter and co-founder of the English rock band Pink Floyd. It was released in 1984 and was certified Gold by the Recording Industry Association of America in 1995.

== Concept history and production ==
The concept was originally envisioned by Waters in 1977 and refined in the early 1980s. In its completed form, it rotates around a man's scattered thoughts during his midlife crisis. These are explored in a dream journey during which he takes a road trip through California, commits adultery with a hitchhiker he picks up along the way, attempts to reconcile with his wife by moving to the wilderness, and finally ends up alone but with greater insight into a common human compassion. Along the way he also faces other fears and paranoia.

The entire story is framed in real time as a fitful dream taking place in the early morning hours of 4:30:18 am to 5:12:32 am on an unspecified day. At the end of the dream, the man wakes up lonely and contrite and turns to his real wife for comfort, presumably having processed his crisis.

In July 1978, Waters presented the concepts and played demos of The Pros and Cons of Hitch Hiking as well as what was then titled Bricks in the Wall, which became The Wall, to his bandmates in Pink Floyd, asking them to decide which should be a group album, and which should be his solo album. After a long debate, they decided that they preferred the concept of Bricks in the Wall, even though their manager at the time, Steve O'Rourke, thought that Pros and Cons was a better-sounding concept, and David Gilmour deemed Pros and Cons stronger musically.

Waters declared:

Well, the idea for the album came concurrently with the idea for The Wall – the basis of the idea. I wrote both pieces at roughly the same time. And in fact, I made demo tapes of them both, and in fact presented both demo tapes to the rest of the Floyd, and said "Look, I'm going to do one of these as a solo project and we'll do one as a band album, and you can choose." So, this was the one that was left over. Um...I mean, it's developed an awful lot since then, I think.

Bricks in the Wall, retitled The Wall, became the next Pink Floyd album in 1979, and Waters shelved Pros and Cons. In early 1983, Waters undertook the shelved project himself. It was recorded in three London studios between February and December 1983: Olympic Studios, Eel Pie Studios and Waters' own Billiard Room, where his demos were constructed. The album features conductor Michael Kamen, actor Jack Palance, saxophonist David Sanborn and guitarist Eric Clapton. Guitarist Tim Renwick said:

Roger's a very different sort of person [i.e. from Eric Clapton or David Gilmour, described as easygoing]. I have tremendous respect for him. He's a very clever man, but he is very serious. When Eric and I toured with him, he wanted everything exactly the same as the record, which, unfortunately, kind of took the fun out of performing.

Track 7, "4.50 AM (Go Fishing)," includes the same refrain as "The Fletcher Memorial Home" from Pink Floyd's The Final Cut: "The Fletcher Memorial Home for incurable tyrants and kings". This song also includes one of the car sounds, and the slightly changed chorus melody, from that album's "Your Possible Pasts".

"I played through some of the songs from the Pros and Cons album," Waters remarked in 1992, "and I was struck by how good they sounded. Looking back, that record dragged a little but, individually, some of the material was excellent." Also the melody first heard in the song In the Flesh?/In the Flesh from The Wall originated from this album and can be heard sporadically throughout the album.

=== Notes on real time ===
The original album was released in 1984 on the traditional two-sided vinyl LP and cassette formats. In keeping with Waters' concept, there are five seconds missing between sides one and two to allow the listener to flip the record (or eject, turn, and reinsert the cassette) in order to keep the second half starting at exactly 4:50 AM as planned.

An unintended consequence of the album's release on CD a few years later was that this gap was lost due to continuous play, which moves the start of the second half, "4:50 AM (Go Fishing)," back to 4:49:55 AM, and the start of the final track, "5:11 AM (The Moment of Clarity)," back to 5:10:59 AM.

Further to this, Track 6 on the first side, "4:47 AM (The Remains of Our Love)," actually begins at 4:46:46 AM.

== Packaging ==
Gerald Scarfe, who had created the album artwork and some animation for Pink Floyd's The Wall album, created all the graphics and animation for the Pros and Cons album. Its cover prompted controversy for featuring a rear-view nude photograph of model and softcore porn actress Linzi Drew. Although it was originally released with the nudity intact, subsequent editions distributed by Columbia Records censored Drew's buttocks with a black box.

== Possible film ==
A film based on the concept was proposed, and in 1987 a press release for the Radio K.A.O.S. album claimed a film adaptation of Pros and Cons... had been completed, though nothing has been heard of it since.

A film was made in 1984 and 1985 which combined Gerald Scarfe's animations and Nicolas Roeg's live-action footage with slit-scan photography created by Peter Truckel at The Moving Picture Company. Also directed by Nicolas Roeg the film was projected on a backdrop behind the stage as the band played. Three promotional videos were also directed by Roeg. "The Pros and Cons of Hitch Hiking" features snippets of the live action material from the screen films interspersed with footage of "Shane" and other cowboy films. "Sexual Revolution" also featured screen film material interspersed with footage Waters singing the song and playing his bass. "Every Stranger's Eyes" is identical to the screen projection, except for the fact that footage of Waters is also interspersed here.

== Track listing ==
All tracks are written by Roger Waters.

Side one
No.	Title	Length
1.	"4:30AM (Apparently They Were Travelling Abroad)"	3:12
2.	"4:33AM (Running Shoes)"	4:08
3.	"4:37AM (Arabs with Knives and West German Skies)"	2:17
4.	"4:39AM (For the First Time Today, Part 2)"	2:02
5.	"4:41AM (Sexual Revolution)"	4:49
6.	"4:47AM (The Remains of Our Love)"	3:09

Side two
No.	Title	Length
1.	"4:50AM (Go Fishing)"	6:59
2.	"4:56AM (For the First Time Today, Part 1)"	1:38
3.	"4:58AM (Dunroamin, Duncarin, Dunlivin)"	3:03
4.	"5:01AM (The Pros and Cons of Hitch Hiking, Part 10)"	4:36
5.	"5:06AM (Every Stranger's Eyes)"	4:48
6.	"5:11AM (The Moment of Clarity)"	1:28
Total length:		42:14

== Personnel ==
Credits adapted from the album's liner notes.

Personnel

- Roger Waters – lead vocals, rhythm guitar, bass, tape effects, production, sleeve design
- Eric Clapton – lead guitar, backing vocals, Roland guitar synthesizer
- Andy Bown – Hammond organ, 12-string guitar
- Michael Kamen – piano, production
- Raphael Ravenscroft, Kevin Flanagan, Vic Sullivan – horns
- David Sanborn – saxophone
- Madeline Bell, Katie Kissoon, Doreen Chanter – backing vocals
- Andy Newmark – drums, percussion
- Ray Cooper – percussion
- The National Philharmonic Orchestra, conducted and arranged by Michael Kamen

Actors (in order of appearance)

- Andy Quigley as 'Welshman in Operating Theatre'
- Beth Porter as 'Wife'
- Roger Waters as 'Man'
- Cherry Vanilla as 'Hitch Hiker' and 'Waitress'
- Manning Redwood and Ed Bishop as 'Truck Drivers'
- Jack Palance as 'Hell's Angel'
- Madeline Bell as 'Hell's Angel's Girlfriend'

Technical personnel

- Andy Jackson – engineer
- Laura Boisan – assistant engineer
- Michael King – SFX boffin
- Zuccarelli Labs – holophonics
- Doug Sax and Mike Reese – mastering
- Gerald Scarfe – sleeve design, illustrations and lettering
- Alex Henderson – photography
- The Artful Dodgers – co-ordination

== Chart positions ==
Chart (1984)	Peak position
Australia (Kent Music Report)	30
New Zealand (RIANZ)	14
Norway (VG-lista)	4
Sweden (Sverigetopplistan)	3
Switzerland (Media Control AG)	12
UK Albums (The Official Charts Company)	13
US Billboard 200	31

== Certifications ==
Region	Certification	Certified units/sales
United Kingdom (BPI)	Silver	60,000^{‡}
United States (RIAA)	Gold	500,000^{^}
^{^} Shipments figures based on certification alone.^{‡} Sales+streaming figures based on certification alone.
