= Jim Haas =

American singer

- Born: James Edwin Haas; Montana, U.S.
- Died: January 2018
- Genres: Rock
- Occupation: Singer
- Instrument: Vocals
- Years active: 1960s–2018

James Edwin Haas (died January 2018) was an American singer who performed vocals for many artists including Andy Williams, Neil Diamond, Jackson Browne, David Cassidy, Leif Garrett, Pink Floyd, and Barry Manilow. Leif Garrett, after Haas' death, explained that in multiple tracks in his earlier albums Haas actually replaced his vocals entirely. The producers had wanted him to "smooth" Garrett's uneven vocals, but made the choice sometimes to replace Garrett entirely on his own albums. In some cases, Garrett's producers even brought in Haas to sing for Garrett behind a curtain during some live concert tour performances. He was a member of Roger Waters' The Bleeding Heart Band.

A Facebook post from one of his associated acts announced Haas' death in January 2018, which was later confirmed in an interview with Garrett.

== Discography ==
- 1974: LP release – Love Is Loving You
- 1974: Lead vocal "Happy Days" theme song (for seasons 1–2 closing credits).
- 1976: Backing vocals – Donny & Marie
- 1979: Backing vocals – Pink Floyd's The Wall
- 1979: Backing vocals – Vicki Lawrence's Newborn Woman
- 1980: Backing vocals – The Wall Tour
- 1980–1981: Backing vocals – Is There Anybody Out There? The Wall Live 1980–81
- 1992: Backing vocals – "Weird Al" Yankovic's Off the Deep End
