= Outside the Wall (song) =

Song by Pink Floyd

from the album The Wall
- Released: 30 November 1979
- Recorded: April – November 1979
- Genre: Art rock; spoken word
- Length: 1:41
- Label: Harvest (UK); Columbia (US)
- Songwriter: Roger Waters
- Producers: Bob Ezrin; David Gilmour; James Guthrie; Roger Waters

"Outside the Wall" (working titles "Bleeding Hearts", "The Buskers") is a song written by Roger Waters. It is the final track on the 1979 Pink Floyd album, The Wall.

== Overview ==
This song is meant as a dénouement to the album. The story ends with "The Trial", in which a "judge" decrees, "Tear down the wall!". An explosion is heard to signify the wall's destruction, and "Outside the Wall" quietly begins. It is not explicitly stated what happens to Pink, the protagonist, after the dismantling of his psychological "wall". At the end, the song cuts off abruptly, as the man says "Isn't this where...", leading into the voice clip at the beginning of "In the Flesh?" that states "...we came in?", giving a sort of circularity to the album.

== Composition ==
The song is the quietest on the album. It is a diatonic song in C major, in 3/4 and is 1:41 in length. In the original demo version of this song, a harmonica was used in place of the clarinet heard on the album version.

== Film version ==
A longer and more elaborate version was recorded for the film which runs for a little more than four minutes and includes the National Philharmonic Orchestra, the Pontarddulais Male Choir and Waters singing the lyrics melodically, rather than reciting them as on the album version. Helping extend the song through the entire end credits is an instrumental bridge, composed of the chords and melody from "Southampton Dock", from The Wall's eventual successor, The Final Cut. This version was never released officially, but was later reused for the credits for The Wall – Live in Berlin. It is in E-flat major for the film rather than C, and the Live in Berlin version is done in E major, while "Southampton Dock" would be finalized in F major.

== Stage performance ==
The stage performances of The Wall ended with "Outside the Wall" after "The Trial", where the performers came walking over the stage in front of the now demolished wall, playing acoustic instruments and singing the vocal tracks. Waters played clarinet and recited the lyrics, while the backing singers sang the lyrics in harmony. David Gilmour played mandolin, Richard Wright played accordion, Willie Wilson played tambourine, Andy Bown played 12-string acoustic guitar, and Snowy White (replaced by Andy Roberts for the 1981 shows), Peter Wood and (unusually) Nick Mason played 6-string acoustic guitars. A similar format was used for the track during Waters' 2010-2013 tour, The Wall Live, including the appearance of Gilmour playing the mandolin and Mason playing a tambourine.

The song was performed again as the closing number for Waters' This Is Not a Drill, with Waters starting on piano while the rest of his band gathers on acoustic instruments and parades around the stage before walking off, with the cameras projecting the final closing moments of the song from backstage onto the LED monitors above the stage.

== Personnel ==
Pink Floyd - Album Version

- Roger Waters – lead vocals

with:

- Frank Marocco – concertina
- Larry Williams – clarinet
- Trevor Veitch – mandolin
- Children's choir from New York – backing vocals

Pink Floyd - Live version, 1980 & 1981:

- David Gilmour – mandolin
- Nick Mason – acoustic guitar
- Roger Waters – lead vocals, clarinet
- Richard Wright – piano accordion

with:

- Andy Bown – 12-string acoustic guitar
- Peter Wood, Snowy White (1980) & Andy Roberts (1981) – acoustic guitar
- Willie Wilson – tambourine
- Joe Chemay, Stan Farber, Jim Haas & Jon Joyce – backing vocals

Roger Waters - Live Version 2010-13

- Roger Waters – lead vocals, trumpet
- G. E. Smith – mandolin
- David Kilminster – banjo
- Snowy White & Jon Carin – acoustic guitar
- Graham Broad – ukulele
- Harry Waters – accordion
- Robbie Wyckoff – backing vocals, tambourine
- Jon Joyce, Kipp Lennon, Mark Lennon & Pat Lennon – backing vocals

with:

- David Gilmour – guest mandolin at London O2 show, 12 May 2011.
- Nick Mason – guest tambourine at London O2 show, 12 May 2011.

Roger Waters - This Is Not A Drill Tour 2022-2023

- Roger Waters – lead vocals, piano
- Jon Carin – marxophone
- Dave Kilminster – acoustic guitar
- Jonathan Wilson – acoustic guitar
- Robert Walter – Hammond organ, melodica
- Seamus Blake – clarinet
- Gus Seyffert – accordion
- Joey Waronker – drum
- Shanay Johnson – backing vocals
- Amanda Belair – backing vocals
