= Jay Stapley =

British guitarist and composer (born 1957)

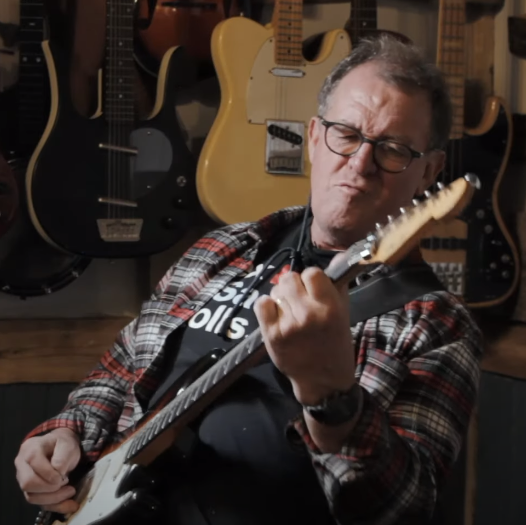
- Stapley in 2019

Background information
- Born: Jeremy Stapley; 13 April 1957 (age 69); Cuckfield, West Sussex, England
- Genres: Rock; blues; folk; country; ambient; electronica
- Occupations: Guitarist; composer; record producer; musical director; educator; music technologist
- Instrument: Guitar
- Years active: 1979–present
- Label: Dammit Music
- Website: jaystapley.co.uk

Jeremy Stapley (born 13 April 1957) or also known as Jay Stapley is a British guitarist, composer, record producer, musical director, and educator, known for his extensive work as a session musician and his long-term collaborations in the European music scene. Over a career spanning more than four decades, he has contributed guitar to dozens of albums across various genres, toured internationally with major artists, composed music for film and television, and is also recognized for his work in music technology and education.

== Early life ==
Jeremy Stapley was born on 13 April 1957 in Cuckfield, West Sussex, England, and spent his early life between Kent and Sussex. He developed an interest in the guitar during his teenage years, quickly moving from initial lessons to performing with local bands. This early experience in live performance provided the groundwork for his eventual decision to pursue music professionally, leading him to relocate to London in the late 1970s to establish himself in the thriving session scene.

== Career ==
=== Session work and major collaborations ===
While in London, Stapley quickly established himself as a versatile and reliable session guitarist. His ability to adapt to diverse styles, from rock and blues to pop and electronic music, resulted in a comprehensive discography. His work includes collaborations with artists such as Mike Oldfield, Suede, Scott Walker, Kirsty MacColl, Toyah Willcox, Slim Whitman, and the pop group Bucks Fizz.

His most recognized touring role was with former Pink Floyd bassist, Roger Waters. Stapley was selected as the touring guitarist for Waters' 1987 Radio K.A.O.S. tour. He was reportedly instructed by Waters to "play his own voice" rather than attempt to replicate the signature sound of David Gilmour. This tour required Stapley to integrate advanced technology, utilizing a Roland GR-100 guitar synthesizer on stage to handle complex textures and parts traditionally played by keyboards.

=== European focus and work with Westernhagen ===
A pivotal point in Stapley's career was his connection to the German music scene. During a tour with singer-songwriter Julian Dawson in the early 1980s, Stapley met producer René Tinner. This meeting led to frequent studio work in Cologne, solidifying his presence in European production circles.

This connection ultimately led to a long-term, defining creative partnership with major German rock star Marius Müller-Westernhagen. Stapley became an integral part of Westernhagen's creative team, serving as a guitarist, musical director for tours, and co-producer on several of his successful albums, demonstrating his capabilities beyond instrumental performance.

=== Solo and instrumental work ===
Stapley has pursued a parallel career as a solo instrumental artist, primarily focusing on instrumental and atmospheric music. In the 1990s, he recorded and released four instrumental albums under a deal with WEA.

His 2017 release, Ambient Blues II, recorded at his own Driftwood Studio in London, combines blues guitar sensibilities with atmospheric, ambient textures, showcasing his interest in combining traditional playing with modern production.

=== Film, television, and production music ===
As a composer and instrumentalist, Stapley has contributed significantly to media scores. His guitar work is featured in major British film and television productions, including the cult classic *Withnail & I*, *How to Get Ahead in Advertising*, *Hale & Pace*, and *The Duty Men*. Beyond specific project work, he is active in producing music for various production libraries and advertising campaigns.

=== Music technology and education ===
Stapley has extensive experience in the field of music technology, which he has integrated into both his playing and his teaching. He has worked directly with companies like Roland Corporation and Digidesign (creators of Pro Tools), providing demonstrations of new gear and offering training at international trade shows and industry events.

He holds a long-standing role as an educator, having taught at the prestigious Institute of Contemporary Music Performance (formerly the Guitar Institute) in London. Here, he designed and delivered specialized courses covering critical industry topics such as live performance, music technology, and songwriting. His commitment to music education is highlighted by his involvement with JAMES, a UK music education organization that documents and promotes his educational work. He continues to deliver masterclasses globally.

=== Label management and business activities ===
In 2011, Stapley founded the independent record label Dammit Music. The label was created to release his own instrumental work as well as projects from other singer-songwriters. This venture formalizes his role as a producer and curator. Furthermore, he serves as the Technical Director of Dammit Ltd, where he oversees studio operations and artist development, managing the technical and business aspects of music production.

== Musical style and philosophy ==
Stapley’s playing style is frequently described as highly supportive and focused on the essence of the composition. He favors a “clean, simple, and powerful” approach, prioritizing musicality and emotional impact over technical virtuosity for its own sake. His philosophy is centered on serving the song, a trait valued highly by the artists and producers he works with. He is also a pioneer in incorporating technology, notably his use of guitar synthesizer technology, to expand the sonic possibilities of the instrument in both live and studio settings.

== Selected discography ==
- Ambient Blues II (2017) – solo
- Four instrumental albums for WEA (1990s) – solo

Key collaborations (selected):

- Roger Waters – *Radio K.A.O.S.* (1987) tour
- Marius Müller-Westernhagen – Guitarist, Musical Director, and Co-Producer on multiple albums
- Mike Oldfield – Session musician
- Suede – Session musician
- Kirsty MacColl – Session musician
- Julian Dawson – Recordings and live performances
- Film/TV: Withnail & I, *How to Get Ahead in Advertising*
