= Doreen Chanter =

British singer

Doreen Chanter is a British singer best known as a member of the Chanter Sisters, and for her work as a backing vocalist and session vocalist, primarily during the 1970s and 1980s.

== Chanter Sisters ==
Chanter started as a member of a group called the Chanters in 1967 with her sister Irene Chanter and her five brothers, releasing four singles which failed to chart. In 1968, the Chanter sisters became a duo initially known as Birds of a Feather.

The duo released four singles between 1967 and 1972 but none of them achieved chart success. Their first album was Birds of a Feather, released in 1970 and featuring Elton John on piano. The Chanter sisters had appeared as backing singers for John in a Radio 1 session.

Long John Baldry asked the sisters to join his live band in 1973. They also featured on June 1, 1974, a live album featuring Nico, Brian Eno, Kevin Ayers and John Cale, and appeared on the Chris Farlowe album BBC Radio 1 Live in Concert. Both sisters are credited on the 1974 John Cale album Fear and, the same year, Ronnie Wood's album I've Got My Own Album to Do, and Rod Stewart's album Smiler. Other credits include Manfred Mann's Earth Band's Solar Fire (1973), Nightingales and Bombers (1975), The Roaring Silence (1976) and Watch (1978), plus John Entwistle's Mad Dog (1975), Andy Fairweather Low's La Booga Rooga (1975), Chris Rea's Whatever Happened to Benny Santini? (1978) and Justin Hayward's Night Flight (1980).

In 1976, Polydor released their second album First Flight, although it failed to make any lasting impression. They sang live with John Miles and appeared on a live album. The sisters released two albums in 1978 through Safari Records, both of which failed to chart.

In 1971, both sisters were cast as schoolgirls in the Hammer film Twins of Evil.

== Solo singer ==
On Phil Manzanera's first solo album Diamond Head (1975), John Wetton and Doreen sang duo on the track "Same Time Next Week". She subsequently joined Jacqui Sullivan as one of The Sirens, backing vocalists for Roxy Music's 1975–76 tour dates. (They can be heard on the band's 1976 live album Viva!) In 1976 her name was credited on Bryan Ferry's album Let's Stick Together, and the following year she appeared as a backing vocalist on another Ferry album, In Your Mind.

In 1981, Chanter was part of a chorus that sang at The Secret Policeman's Ball, with other chorus members including Phil Collins, Donovan, Sheena Easton, Bob Geldof, Midge Ure and Tom Robinson. She also wrote two singles for Kiki Dee, released in 1981, and a song sung by Dee for the British television series Roll Over Beethoven in 1985. The Chanter-penned 1981 single "Star" became the theme song for the talent show Opportunity Knocks when it was revived by the BBC in 1987. She made a cameo in the film Pink Floyd The Wall in 1982 as a vocalist in a choir and, with Irene, provided backing vocals on the Pink Floyd song, "Not Now John", from the band's 1983 album, The Final Cut. Also in 1983, both Doreen and Irene appeared as backing singers on The Undertones track "The Love Parade" on their The Sin of Pride album. The same year, Chanter provided vocals for the song "Say You're Sorry" from Ministry's With Sympathy. Also in 1983, she guested on backing vocals on Keith Emerson's Murder Rock album on one song, "Not So Innocent", as well as lead vocalist on three songs. She also wrote the lyrics for them.

Chanter was part of the touring bands for both Roger Waters and Van Morrison in 1984. She sang on Waters' album The Pros and Cons of Hitchhiking, released in that year, and provided backing vocals together with Katie Kissoon during the tour promoting the record in 1984–85. The duo returned again for the Radio K.A.O.S tour in 1987. Chanter performed on Waters' next releases – first, she sang on three songs from Radio K.A.O.S. in 1987 and then on five songs on the Amused to Death album in 1992.

She also toured as part of Meat Loaf's backing band Neverland Express in 1984–85, including appearing on Bad Attitude – Live! (1985), and as part of Joe Cocker's touring band in 1989. Chanter featured on Cocker's live album Joe Cocker Live, released in 1990.

Chanter appeared as a backing vocalist on one of Chris Farlowe's albums, Waiting in the Wings (1992).
