= Roger Waters discography =

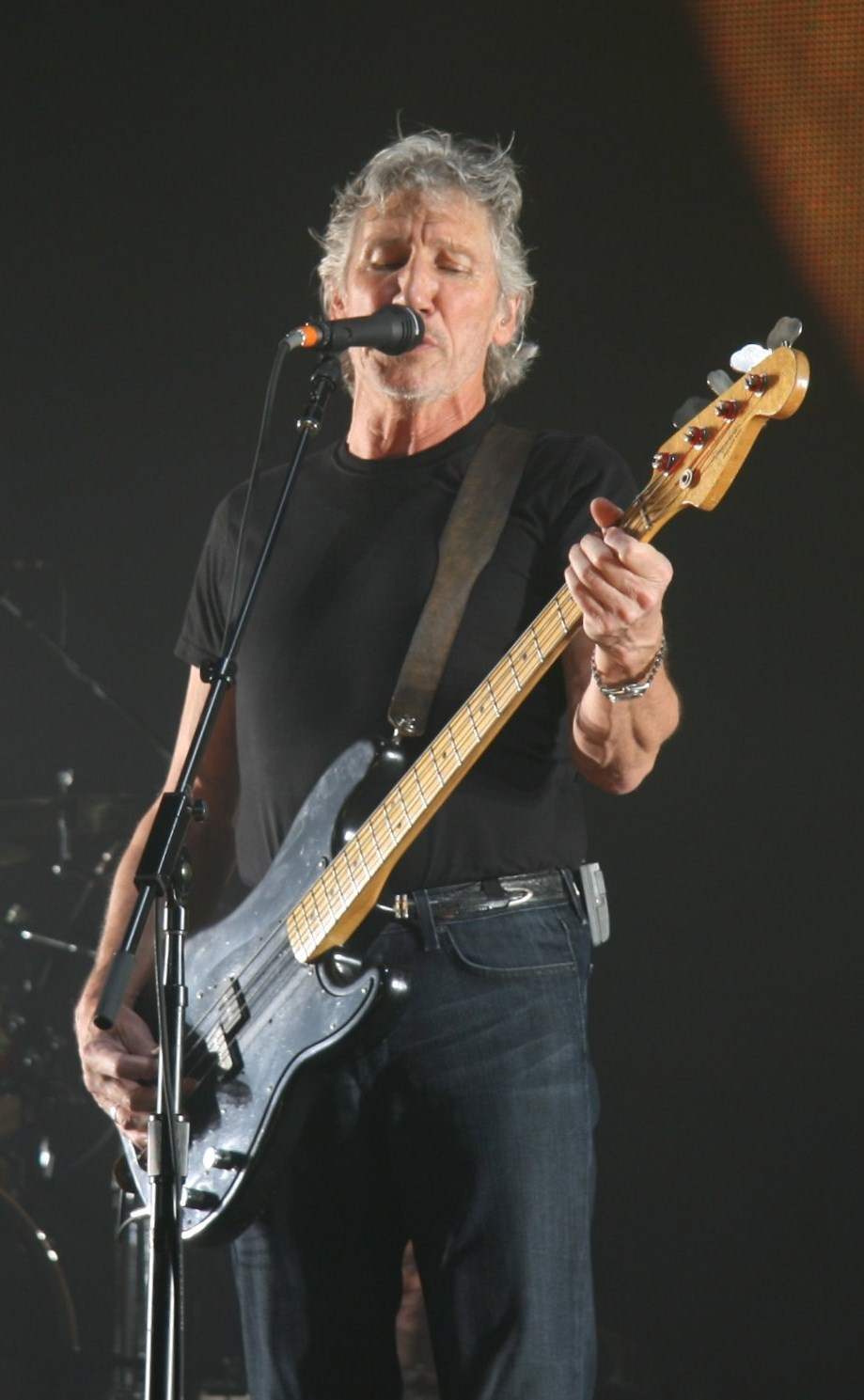
- Roger Waters performing at London's O2 Arena on 18 May 2008
- Studio albums: 7
- Extended plays: 1
- Soundtrack albums: 2
- Live albums: 5
- Compilation albums: 1
- Singles: 24
- Video albums: 4
- Music videos: 13
- Box sets: 1
- Classical albums: 1

Roger Waters' solo career includes seven studio albums: The Pros and Cons of Hitchhiking (1984), Radio K.A.O.S. (1987), Amused to Death (1992), Is This the Life We Really Want? (2017), Igor Stravinsky's The Soldier's Tale (2019), The Lockdown Sessions (2022), and The Dark Side of the Moon Redux (2023). The Pros and Cons of Hitch Hiking, has been certified Gold by the RIAA. Amused to Death is Waters' most critically acclaimed solo recording to date, garnering some comparison to his previous work with Pink Floyd. Waters described the record as "a stunning piece of work", ranking the album with The Dark Side of the Moon and The Wall as one of the best of his career. The album had one hit, the song "What God Wants, Part 1", which reached number 35 in the UK in September 1992 and number 5 on Billboard's Mainstream Rock chart in the US. Amused to Death was certified Silver by the British Phonographic Industry. Jeff Beck played lead guitar on many of the album's tracks, which were recorded with an impressive cast of studio musicians at ten different studios. Sales of Amused to Death topped out at around one million and there was no tour in support of this album. Waters would first perform material from it seven years later during his In the Flesh tour (not to be confused to the 1977 Pink Floyd tour of the same name).

In 1986, he contributed songs and a score to the soundtrack of the movie When the Wind Blows based on the Raymond Briggs book of the same name. In 1990, he staged one of the largest rock concerts in history, The Wall – Live in Berlin, on the vacant terrain between Potsdamer Platz and the Brandenburg Gate, with an estimated 200,000 people in attendance. In 1996, Waters was inducted into the US and UK Rock and Roll Hall of Fame as a member of Pink Floyd. He has toured extensively as a solo act since 1999 and played The Dark Side of the Moon in its entirety for his world tours of 2006–2008. In 2005, he released Ça Ira, an opera in three acts translated from Etienne Roda-Gil and his wife Nadine Delahaye's libretto about the early French Revolution. On 2 July 2005, he reunited with other members of Pink Floyd—Nick Mason, Richard Wright, and David Gilmour—for the Live 8 concert in London's Hyde Park, Pink Floyd's only appearance with Waters since their performance of The Wall at Earls Court in London 24 years earlier. In 2010, he commenced The Wall Live tour, which concluded in 2014.

== Albums ==
=== Studio albums ===
Title	Album details	Peak chart positions											Certifications
Title	Album details	UK	AUS	AUT	GER	ITA	NLD	NOR	NZ	SWE	SWI	US	Certifications
The Pros and Cons of Hitch Hiking	Released: 30 April 1984; Label: Harvest, Columbia; Formats: CD, CS, LP, DL	13	30	—	49	—	1	4	14	3	12	31	BPI: Silver; RIAA: Gold
Radio K.A.O.S.	Released: 15 June 1987; Label: EMI, Columbia; Formats: CD, CS, LP, DL	25	33	—	58	—	31	6	13	12	20	50	BPI: Silver; MC: Gold
Amused to Death	Released: 7 September 1992; Label: Columbia; Formats: CD, CS, LP	8	14	25	4	22	10	2	6	10	12	21	ARIA: Gold; BPI: Gold; MC: Gold
Is This the Life We Really Want?	Released: 2 June 2017; Label: Columbia; Formats: CD, LP	3	7	3	3	2	2	1	2	3	1	11	BPI: Silver; FIMI: Gold; IFPI SWI: Gold
Igor Stravinsky's The Soldier's Tale	Released: 26 October 2018; Label: Sony Classical Masterworks; Formats: CD, LP	—	—	—	—	46	163	—	—	—	—	—	
The Lockdown Sessions	Released: 9 December 2022; Label: Legacy	56	—	—	14	24	26	—	33	—	13	—	
The Dark Side of the Moon Redux	Released: 6 October 2023; Label: Cooking Vinyl; Formats: CD, 2LP	4	55	6	3	5	3	—	24	39	5	142	
"—" denotes a recording that did not chart or was not released in that territory.

=== Soundtracks ===
Title	Album details
Music from The Body (with Ron Geesin)	Released: 28 November 1970; Label: Harvest, EMI; Format: CD, CS, LP, DL
When the Wind Blows: Original Motion Picture Soundtrack (with The Bleeding Heart Band)	Released: 1986; Label: Virgin; Format: CD, CS, LP

=== Live albums ===
Title	Album details	Peak chart positions												Certifications
Title	Album details	UK	AUS	AUT	GER	ITA	NLD	NOR	NZ	POL	SWE	SWI	US	Certifications
The Wall – Live in Berlin	Released: 17 September 1990; Label: Mercury; Formats: CD, SACD, CD+DVD, CS, LP, DL	27	10	25	10	—	15	17	4	47	34	11	56	ARIA: Gold; MC: 2× Platinum
In the Flesh – Live	Released: 5 December 2000; Label: Columbia; Formats: CD, SACD, CD+DVD, CS, DL	170	100	—	99	61	10	2	24	13	10	15	136	
Roger Waters: The Wall	Released: 20 November 2015; Label: Legacy; Formats: CD, CD+DVD, CD+Blu-ray, LP	53	46	29	22	11	19	11	38	—	—	20	134	
Roger Waters: Us + Them	Released: 3 October 2020; Label: Legacy; Formats: CD, LP	9	35	—	4	5	15	—	—	3	—	6	—	
Roger Waters: This Is Not a Drill – Live from Prague	Released: 1 August 2025; Label: Columbia, Legacy; Formats: 2×CD, 4×LP, Blu-ray, DVD, streaming	20	—	2	1	12	8	61	—	—	—	5	—	
"—" denotes a recording that did not chart or was not released in that territory.

=== Compilation albums ===
Title	Album details	Peak chart positions				
Title	Album details	GER	ITA	NOR	POL	SWI
Flickering Flame: The Solo Years Volume 1	Released: 30 April 2002; Label: Columbia, Sony Music; Format: CD, DL	53	35	21	43	62

=== Operas ===
Title	Album details	Peak chart positions			Certifications
Title	Album details	FRA	ITA	POL	Certifications
Ça Ira	Released: 4 October 2005; Label: Sony Classical, Columbia; Formats: CD, CD+DVD, SACD, DL	187	31	12	ZPAV: Platinum

=== Other albums ===
Title	Album details
Pros and Cons (The Interviews)	Released: 7 April 2015; Label: Euromax; Formats: CD

=== Video albums ===
Title	Album details	Peak chart positions				Certifications
Title	Album details	US	NLD	SWE	SWI	Certifications
The Wall – Live in Berlin	Released: 21 August 1990; Label: PolyGram Music Video; Formats: Laserdisc, VHS, DVD	6	6	8	3	ARIA: Platinum; BPI: Gold; MC: Platinum; RIAA: Gold
In the Flesh – Live	Released: 5 December 2000; Label: Columbia; Formats: VHS, DVD	19	1	1	—	ARIA: 2× Platinum; BPI: Gold; BVMI: Gold
Roger Waters: The Wall	Released: 6 September 2014; Label: Legacy; Formats: DVD, Blu-ray	134	14	—	—	BPI: Platinum; BVMI: Gold; RIAA: Platinum; ZPAV: Gold
Roger Waters: Us + Them	Release: 2 October 2020; Label: Sony Music; Formats: DVD, Blu-ray	—	—	—	1	
"—" denotes a recording that did not chart or was not released in that territory.

== Box sets ==
Title	Album details	Peak chart positions
Title	Album details	NOR
The Collection	Released: 2011; Label: Columbia; Formats: 7 CD+DVD	34

== Singles ==
List of singles, with selected chart positions
Year	Title	Peak chart positions					Album
Year	Title	UK	AUS	NLD	NZ	US Main.	Album
1984	"The Pros and Cons of Hitch Hiking"	76	74	18	—	17	The Pros and Cons of Hitch Hiking
1984	"Every Stranger's Eyes"	—	—	—	—	—	The Pros and Cons of Hitch Hiking
1987	"Radio Waves"	74	43	—	26	12	Radio K.A.O.S.
1987	"Sunset Strip"	—	—	—	—	15	Radio K.A.O.S.
1987	"The Tide Is Turning (After Live Aid)"	54	49	—	—	—	Radio K.A.O.S.
1987	"Who Needs Information"	—	—	—	—	—	Radio K.A.O.S.
1990	"Another Brick in the Wall (Part 2)" (with Cyndi Lauper)	82	—	—	—	—	The Wall – Live in Berlin
1990	"The Tide Is Turning" (with Joni Mitchell, Cyndi Lauper, Bryan Adams, Van Morrison and Paul Carrack)	—	—	—	—	—	The Wall – Live in Berlin
1992	"What God Wants, Part I"	35	103	49	26	4	Amused to Death
1992	"The Bravery of Being Out of Range"	—	—	—	—	—	Amused to Death
1993	"Three Wishes"	—	—	—	—	—	Amused to Death
2004	"To Kill the Child/Leaving Beirut"	—	—	—	—	—	non-album single
2007	"Hello (I Love You)" (with Howard Shore)	—	—	—	—	—	The Last Mimzy: Original Motion Picture Soundtrack
2010	"We Shall Overcome"	—	—	—	—	—	non-album single
2017	"Smell the Roses"	—	—	—	—	—	Is This the Life We Really Want?
2017	"Déjà Vu"	—	—	—	—	—	Is This the Life We Really Want?
2017	"The Last Refugee"	—	—	—	—	—	Is This the Life We Really Want?
2022	"Comfortably Numb 2022"	—	—	—	—	—	The Lockdown Sessions
2023	"Money"	—	—	—	—	—	The Dark Side of the Moon Redux
2023	"Time"	—	—	—	—	—	The Dark Side of the Moon Redux
2023	"Speak to Me"/"Breathe"	—	—	—	—	—	The Dark Side of the Moon Redux
2025	"Wish You Were Here"	—	—	—	—	—	Roger Waters: This Is Not a Drill – Live from Prague
2025	"Is This the Life We Really Want?"	—	—	—	—	—	Roger Waters: This Is Not a Drill – Live from Prague
2025	"Have a Cigar"	—	—	—	—	—	Roger Waters: This Is Not a Drill – Live from Prague
"—" denotes a release that did not chart.

== Collaborations and other appearances ==
Year	Album/single	Collaborator	Comment
1999	The Legend of 1900	Ennio Morricone	The song "Lost Boys Calling" performed by Ennio Morricone feat. Eddie Van Halen and Roger Waters
1999	Vagabond Ways	Marianne Faithfull	The song "Incarceration of a Flower Child" is written by Roger Waters, who also performs bass and keyboards
2007	Live Earth: The Concerts for a Climate in Crisis	Various Artists	The album features the track "Another Brick in the Wall Part II" performed by Roger Waters which also includes the song "The Happiest Days of Our Lives"
2013	Love for Levon: Benefit to Save the Barn	Various Artists	The album features Roger Waters performing the songs "The Night They Drove Old Dixie Down" (with My Morning Jacket and G.E. Smith) and "Wide River To Cross" (with G.E. Smith)
2013	12-12-12: The Concert for Sandy Relief	Various Artists	The album features Roger Waters performing the songs "Another Brick in the Atlantic Wall Part I, II & III" (the actual songs are "The Happiest Days of Our Lives", "Another Brick in the Wall (Part II)" and "The Ballad of Jean Charles de Menezes"), "Us and Them" and "Comfortably Numb" (with Eddie Vedder)

== Music videos ==
Year	Song	Director(s)	Album
1984	"The Pros and Cons of Hitch Hiking"		The Pros and Cons of Hitch Hiking
1984	"Every Stranger's Eyes"		The Pros and Cons of Hitch Hiking
1984	"Sexual Revolution"		The Pros and Cons of Hitch Hiking
1987	"Radio Waves"		Radio K.A.O.S.
1987	"Sunset Strip"		Radio K.A.O.S.
1987	"The Tide Is Turning"		Radio K.A.O.S.
1992	"What God Wants, Part I"		Amused to Death
1992	"Three Wishes"		Amused to Death
1992	"Amused to Death"		Amused to Death
2015	"What God Wants, Part I" (2015)		Amused to Death
2017	"The Last Refugee"	Sean Evans & Roger Waters	Is This the Life We Really Want?
2017	"Wait for Her"	Sean Evans	Is This the Life We Really Want?
2022	"Comfortably Numb 2022"	Sean Evans	The Lockdown Sessions
