= Roger Waters: Us + Them =

- Film poster
- Directed by: Roger Waters; Sean Evans
- Written by: Roger Waters
- Screenplay by: Roger Waters; Sean Evans
- Produced by: Mark Fenwick; Clare Spencer; Roger Waters
- Starring: Roger Waters; Dave Kilminster; Jon Carin; Jonathan Wilson; Joey Waronker; Gus Seyffert; Lucius (Holly Laessig, Jess Wolfe); Bo Koster; Ian Ritchie
- Cinematography: Brett Turnbull
- Edited by: Katharine McQuerrey
- Music by: Roger Waters
- Distributed by: Us + Them Production Limited
- Release dates: 7 September 2019 (Venice); 2 October 2019 (UK)
- Running time: 135 minutes
- Country: United Kingdom
- Language: English

Roger Waters: Us + Them is a 2019 British concert film and live album by English musician Roger Waters, founding member of Pink Floyd. The film was directed by Waters and Sean Evans, and captures a truncated performance from Waters' tour of the same name. This is the second film where both Waters and Evans are involved, their first being Roger Waters: The Wall.

The film, recorded across the four shows from the Ziggo Dome in Amsterdam., features songs from Pink Floyd albums and Waters' last album, Is This the Life We Really Want?.

== Release ==
The cinema release of the film was accompanied by a documentary titled A Fleeting Glimpse, capturing behind the scenes footage of the band rehearsing, performing sound-checks before shows and the aftermath of performances. Before its theatrical release, the film premiered on 7 September 2019 at Venice Film Festival. The film released in theaters across the world on 2 and 6 October in 2019.

In May 2020, it was announced that the film would be getting a digital release, starting with YouTube on 16 June, and followed by Blu-ray, DVD, 3-LP and 2-CD set on 2 October, including as an extra, the songs "Smell the Roses" & "Comfortably Numb" on the DVD and Blu-Ray.

== Track listing ==
Roger Waters: Us + Them

Live album by Roger Waters
- Released: 2 October 2020
- Recorded: June 18–23, 2018
- Venue: Ziggo Dome Amsterdam
- Genre: Progressive rock
- Length: 120:21
- Label: Columbia Records
- Producer: Nigel Godrich

Roger Waters chronology
Igor Stravinsky's The Soldier's Tale (2018)	Roger Waters: Us + Them (2020)	The Lockdown Sessions (2022)

CD one:

1. "Intro"
2. "Speak to Me" (Played on tape, with parts of the vocal track from "When We Were Young")
3. "Breathe"
4. "One of These Days"
5. "Time / Breathe (Reprise)"
6. "The Great Gig in the Sky"
7. "Welcome to the Machine"
8. "Déjà Vu"
9. "The Last Refugee"
10. "Picture That"
11. "Wish You Were Here"
12. "The Happiest Days of Our Lives"
13. "Another Brick in the Wall (Part II)"
14. "Another Brick in the Wall (Part III)"

CD two:

1. "Dogs"
2. "Pigs (Three Different Ones)"
3. "Money"
4. "Us and Them"
5. "Brain Damage" (with vocal intro)
6. "Eclipse"
7. "The Last Refugee (Reprise)"
8. "Deja Vu (Reprise)"

Extra tracks: (Only on the digital, DVD & Blu-Ray editions)

1. "Smell the Roses"
2. "Comfortably Numb"
- Note: On digital releases, all tracks are noted "Live in Amsterdam, June, 2018".

== Performers and personnel ==
- Rufat Aliyev as Refugee
- Farshid Azizi as Refugee
- Nikoo Bafti as Refugee
- Azzurra Caccetta as The Last Refugee
- Anais Dupay-Rahman as Her Child
- Salem Hanna as Refugee
- Hayley as Dancer in Money
- Glendon Jones as Prisoner
- Farzad Khaledi as Refugee
- Buket Kömür as Palestinian Girl
- Lucas Kornacki as Drone Pilot
- Jad Marz as Refugee
- Pedram Mehdian as Refugee
- Nader Moradi as Refugee
- Feride Morcay as Refugee
- Liat Mordechai as Refugee
- Farahnaz Rahmani as Refugee
- Sylvana Savvas as Refugee
- Reza Zohreh Kermani as Refugee (as Reza Kermani)

== Musicians ==
- Roger Waters - vocals, guitars, bass
- Gus Seyffert - backing vocals, guitars, bass
- Jonathan Wilson - guitars, vocals
- Dave Kilminster - guitars, talkbox, backing vocals
- Jon Carin - keyboards, piano, programming, synthesizers, lap steel guitar, guitars, backing vocals
- Bo Koster - keyboards, hammond organ
- Holly Laessig - vocals
- Jess Wolfe - vocals
- Ian Ritchie - saxophone
- Joey Waronker - drums

== Charts ==
Chart performance for Us + Them
Chart (2020)	Peak position
Australian Albums (ARIA)	35
Austrian Albums (Ö3 Austria)	12
Belgian Albums (Ultratop Flanders)	23
Belgian Albums (Ultratop Wallonia)	10
Dutch Albums (Album Top 100)	15
French Albums (SNEP)	33
German Albums (Offizielle Top 100)	4
Hungarian Albums (MAHASZ)	10
Irish Albums (OCC)	27
Italian Albums (FIMI)	5
New Zealand Albums (RMNZ)	24
Norwegian Albums (VG-lista)	15
Polish Albums (ZPAV)	3
Portuguese Albums (AFP)	1
Scottish Albums (OCC)	5
Spanish Albums (PROMUSICAE)	13
Swiss Albums (Schweizer Hitparade)	6
UK Albums (OCC)	9

== Certifications ==
Region	Certification	Certified units/sales
France (SNEP) video	Gold	5,000^{*}
^{*} Sales figures based on certification alone.
