= List of songs recorded by Roger Waters =

A list of songs recorded by English musician Roger Waters as a solo artist.

== List ==
All songs written by Roger Waters, except where noted.

Key
†	Indicates single release

Name of song, producer(s), original release, and year of release
Song	Producer(s)	Original release	Year	Ref.
"4:30 am (Apparently They Were Travelling Abroad)"	Roger Waters; Michael Kamen	The Pros and Cons of Hitch Hiking	1984	
"4:33 am (Running Shoes)"	Roger Waters; Michael Kamen	The Pros and Cons of Hitch Hiking	1984	
"4:37 am (Arabs with Knives and West German Skies)"	Roger Waters; Michael Kamen	The Pros and Cons of Hitch Hiking	1984	
"4:39 am (For the First Time Today, Part 2)"	Roger Waters; Michael Kamen	The Pros and Cons of Hitch Hiking	1984	
"4:41 am (Sexual Revolution)"	Roger Waters; Michael Kamen	The Pros and Cons of Hitch Hiking	1984	
"4:47 am (The Remains of Our Love)"	Roger Waters; Michael Kamen	The Pros and Cons of Hitch Hiking	1984	
"4:50 am (Go Fishing)"	Roger Waters; Michael Kamen	The Pros and Cons of Hitch Hiking	1984	
"4:56 am (For the First Time Today, Part 1)"	Roger Waters; Michael Kamen	The Pros and Cons of Hitch Hiking	1984	
"4:58 am (Dunroamin, Duncarin, Dunlivin)"	Roger Waters; Michael Kamen	The Pros and Cons of Hitch Hiking	1984	
"5:01 am (The Pros and Cons of Hitch Hiking, Part 10)" †	Roger Waters; Michael Kamen	The Pros and Cons of Hitch Hiking	1984	
"5:06 am (Every Stranger's Eyes)" †	Roger Waters; Michael Kamen	The Pros and Cons of Hitch Hiking	1984	
"5:11 am (The Moment of Clarity)"	Roger Waters; Michael Kamen	The Pros and Cons of Hitch Hiking	1984	
"Amused to Death"	Roger Waters; Patrick Leonard; Nick Griffiths	Amused to Death	1992	
"The Ballad of Bill Hubbard"	Roger Waters; Patrick Leonard; Nick Griffiths	Amused to Death	1992	
"Bed-Time-Dream-Clime" (Note: Written by Ron Geesin)	Roger Waters; Ron Geesin	Music from The Body	1970	
"Bird in a Gale"	Nigel Godrich	Is This the Life We Really Want?	2017	
"Body Transport" (Note: Co-written by Roger Waters and Ron Geesin)	Roger Waters; Ron Geesin	Music from The Body	1970	
"The Bravery of Being Out of Range" †	Roger Waters; Patrick Leonard; Nick Griffiths	Amused to Death	1992	
"Breathe"	Roger Waters; Ron Geesin	Music from The Body	1970	
"Bridge Passage for Three Plastic Teeth"	Roger Waters; Ron Geesin	Music from The Body	1970	
"Broken Bones"	Nigel Godrich	Is This the Life We Really Want?	2017	
"Chain of Life"	Roger Waters; Ron Geesin	Music from The Body	1970	
"Dance of the Red Corpuscles"	Roger Waters; Ron Geesin	Music from The Body	1970	
"Déjà Vu" †	Nigel Godrich	Is This the Life We Really Want?	2017	
"Embryo Thought"	Roger Waters; Ron Geesin	Music from The Body	1970	
"Embryonic Womb-Walk"	Roger Waters; Ron Geesin	Music from The Body	1970	
"Four Minutes"	Roger Waters; Ian Ritchie; Nick Griffiths	Radio K.A.O.S.	1987	
"A Gentle Breeze Blew Through Life"	Roger Waters; Ron Geesin	Music from The Body	1970	
"Get Back to Radio"	Roger Waters	"Sunset Strip"	1987	
"Give Birth to a Smile"	Roger Waters; Ron Geesin	Music from The Body	1970	
"Going to Live in L.A."	Roger Waters	"Radio Waves"	1987	
"Hand Dance – Full Evening Dress"	Roger Waters; Ron Geesin	Music from The Body	1970	
"Hello (I Love You)" (Note: Written by Roger Waters and Howard Shore) †	Roger Waters; James Guthrie	Non-album single	2007	
"Home"	Roger Waters; Ian Ritchie; Nick Griffiths	Radio K.A.O.S.	1987	
"Is This the Life We Really Want?"	Nigel Godrich	Is This the Life We Really Want?	2017	
"It's a Miracle"	Roger Waters; Patrick Leonard; Nick Griffiths	Amused to Death	1992	
"The Last Refugee" †	Nigel Godrich	Is This the Life We Really Want?	2017	
"Late Home Tonight, Part I"	Roger Waters; Patrick Leonard; Nick Griffiths	Amused to Death	1992	
"Late Home Tonight, Part II"	Roger Waters; Patrick Leonard; Nick Griffiths	Amused to Death	1992	
"Leaving Beirut" †	Roger Waters; Nick Griffiths	Non-album single	2004	
"Lick Your Partners"	Roger Waters; Ron Geesin	Music from The Body	1970	
"March Past of the Embryos"	Roger Waters; Ron Geesin	Music from The Body	1970	
"Me or Him"	Roger Waters; Ian Ritchie; Nick Griffiths	Radio K.A.O.S.	1987	
"Molly's Song"	Roger Waters	"Who Needs Information"	1987	
"More Than Seven Dwarfs in Penis-Land"	Roger Waters; Ron Geesin	Music from The Body	1970	
"The Most Beautiful Girl"	Nigel Godrich	Is This the Life We Really Want?	2017	
"Mrs. Throat Goes Walking"	Roger Waters; Ron Geesin	Music from The Body	1970	
"Oceans Apart"	Nigel Godrich	Is This the Life We Really Want?	2017	
"Old Folks Ascension"	Roger Waters; Ron Geesin	Music from The Body	1970	
"Our Song"	Roger Waters; Ron Geesin	Music from The Body	1970	
"Part of Me Died"	Nigel Godrich	Is This the Life We Really Want?	2017	
"Perfect Sense, Part I"	Roger Waters; Patrick Leonard; Nick Griffiths	Amused to Death	1992	
"Perfect Sense, Part II"	Roger Waters; Patrick Leonard; Nick Griffiths	Amused to Death	1992	
"Picture That"	Nigel Godrich	Is This the Life We Really Want?	2017	
"Piddle in Perspex"	Roger Waters; Ron Geesin	Music from The Body	1970	
"The Powers That Be"	Roger Waters; Ian Ritchie; Nick Griffiths	Radio K.A.O.S.	1987	
"Radio Waves" †	Roger Waters; Ian Ritchie; Nick Griffiths	Radio K.A.O.S.	1987	
"Red Stuff Writhe"	Roger Waters; Ron Geesin	Music from The Body	1970	
"Sea Shell and Soft Stone"	Roger Waters; Ron Geesin	Music from The Body	1970	
"Sea Shell and Stone"	Roger Waters; Ron Geesin	Music from The Body	1970	
"Smell the Roses" †	Nigel Godrich	Is This the Life We Really Want?	2017	
"Sunset Strip" †	Roger Waters; Ian Ritchie; Nick Griffiths	Radio K.A.O.S.	1987	
"Three Wishes" †	Roger Waters; Patrick Leonard; Nick Griffiths	Amused to Death	1992	
"The Tide Is Turning (After Live Aid)" †	Roger Waters; Ian Ritchie; Nick Griffiths	Radio K.A.O.S.	1987	
"To Kill the Child" †	Roger Waters; Nick Griffiths	Non-album single	2004	
"Too Much Rope"	Roger Waters; Patrick Leonard; Nick Griffiths	Amused to Death	1992	
"Wait for Her" (Note: Written by Roger Waters and Mahmoud Darwish) †	Nigel Godrich	Is This the Life We Really Want?	2017	
"Watching TV"	Roger Waters; Patrick Leonard; Nick Griffiths	Amused to Death	1992	
"We Shall Overcome" †	–	Non-album single	2010	
"What God Wants, Part I" †	Roger Waters; Patrick Leonard; Nick Griffiths	Amused to Death	1992	
"What God Wants, Part II"	Roger Waters; Patrick Leonard; Nick Griffiths	Amused to Death	1992	
"What God Wants, Part III"	Roger Waters; Patrick Leonard; Nick Griffiths	Amused to Death	1992	
"When We Were Young"	Nigel Godrich	Is This the Life We Really Want?	2017	
"Who Needs Information" †	Roger Waters; Ian Ritchie; Nick Griffiths	Radio K.A.O.S.	1987	
"The Womb Bit"	Roger Waters; Ron Geesin	Music from The Body	1970	
