= This Is Not a Drill =

2022–23 concert tour by Roger Waters

- Tour by Roger Waters
- Logo for the North American leg of the tour
- Location: Europe; North America; South America
- Start date: 6 July 2022
- End date: 9 December 2023
- Legs: 3
- No. of shows: 99

Roger Waters concert chronology
- Us + Them Tour (2017–18); This Is Not a Drill (2022–23); ...

This Is Not a Drill was the seventh concert tour by the English songwriter Roger Waters. The tour began at the PPG Paints Arena in Pittsburgh, United States, on 6 July 2022, and ended at the Estadio Olímpico Atahualpa of Quito, Ecuador, on 9 December 2023. (Note: It was originally scheduled to take place between July and October 2020, was suspended after the COVID-19 pandemic advance, and rescheduled to take place in 2022.) Waters first talked about a new live spectacle following his Us + Them Tour during a Rolling Stone interview in September 2019. In 2021, he called the show his "first farewell tour".

== Background ==
In 2017, Waters released his fourth solo album Is This the Life We Really Want?, conceived as a radio play about a man and his granddaughter investigating why children are being killed in other parts of the world. Waters described the play as "part magic carpet ride, part political rant, part anguish".

To promote the album, Waters embarked on the Us + Them Tour, visiting North America, Oceania, Europe, and Latin America between May 2017 and December 2018. A portion of the show featured extensive anti-Donald Trump imagery during the performance of Pink Floyd songs, which led some attendees to boo or even walk out of the show. Waters responded to the pro-Trump critics by saying, "I find it slightly surprising that anybody could have been listening to my songs for 50 years without understanding", and said to those critics if they didn't like politics in music to "go see Katy Perry or watch the Kardashians. I don't care".

The tour was chronicled in a film, Roger Waters: Us + Them, recorded at the Ziggo Dome in Amsterdam, and released in September 2019. In an interview promoting the film, Waters talked to Rolling Stone about his plans for the future, where he first mentioned the main concept for a following tour:

It will be even more political than Us + Them was — political and humane. We were listening to songs and looking at set lists today. We were talking about, what should we call it? I shouldn't be giving this away, but I don't give a shit because it will probably all change, but imagine the iconic helicopter that normally comes before “Happiest Days” and “Brick 2” — that noise that we all know and love — and imagine a megaphone, somebody abused this device before, I know — but, "This is not a drill". I thought that could be a good title for the show: This Is Not a Drill. The ruling class is killing us.

In the same interview, Waters stated the tour would only visit arenas, with no concerts held in outdoor venues, and it would visit cities in United States, Canada, "and maybe three gigs in Mexico City. And that’s all. I can’t go off around the world, and I don’t really want to either".

== Development ==
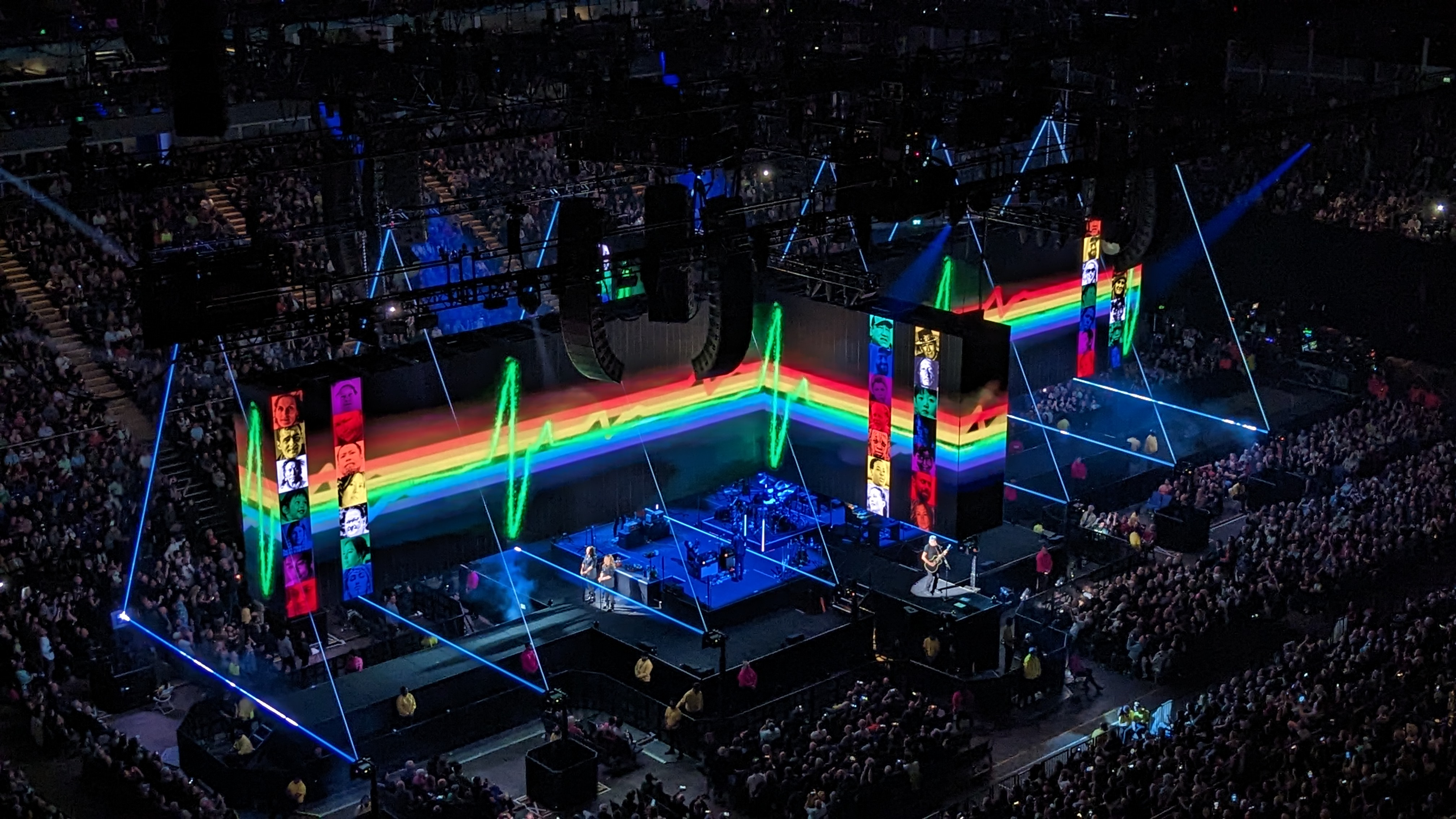
The 360° stage during North American and European arena concerts featured a cross-shaped screen, and several visual effects.

In January 2020, Waters officially announced the tour, named This Is Not a Drill. "This tour will be part of a global movement by people who are concerned by others to affect the change that is necessary", said Waters in a video announcing the tour. "That’s why we’re going on the road. That’s why speak to each other in pubs. That’s why this conversation should be on everybody’s lips, constantly, the whole time, because it’s super important. So I hope you’ll all come to the shows". The show saw him performing in a 360° stage for the first time. Originally, the final show in the United States was due to take place on 3 October 2020, exactly one month before the 2020 presidential election.

On 27 March 2020, Waters posted a statement on his website and social media, announcing the postponement of the tour to the following year due to the coronavirus pandemic outbreak, declaring that the situation was a "Bummer, but if it saves one life, it’s worth it". In April 2021, tour dates in Canada and United States were announced to take place in 2022, while the concerts in Mexico were announced later in June. In a statement, it was specified that the show "includes a dozen great songs from Pink Floyd’s Golden Era alongside several new ones — words and music, same writer, same heart, same soul, same man". Waters has called This Is Not a Drill his "first farewell tour". In November 2021, a new show in Monterrey, Mexico, was announced, followed by three new shows in the United States announced later in March 2022. Concerts in North America took place between July and October 2022.

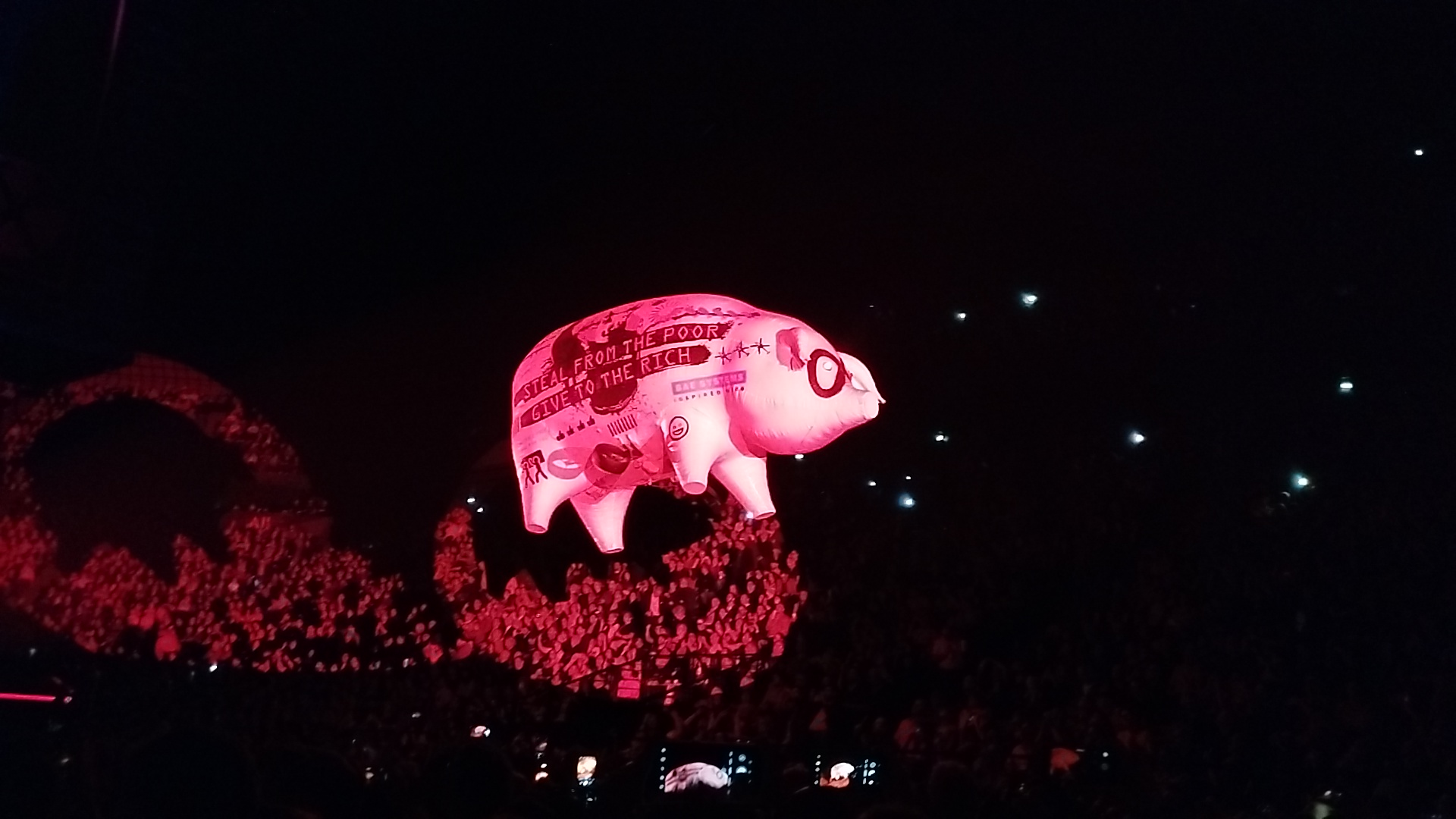
During concerts, Waters makes use of the Pink Floyd pigs from the cover of Animals, which he has used on most of his tours.

Rehearsals for the tour began around 13 June 2022 in Southampton, with the first full rehearsal taking place on 16 June. Sean Evans, Waters' tour creative director, reprises his role for this tour, creating all visuals and stage design. To promote the tour, Waters and his band made an appearance on The Late Show with Stephen Colbert on 21 June, and performed a medley of songs from The Wall.

At the beginning of every concert, a voiceover described by journalist James Ball as "a plummy British announcer" requested audience members to turn off their cell phones, and to "fuck off to the bar" if they like Pink Floyd but "can’t stand Roger’s politics". Waters debuted a new song at the show, titled "The Bar", which was written during lockdown.

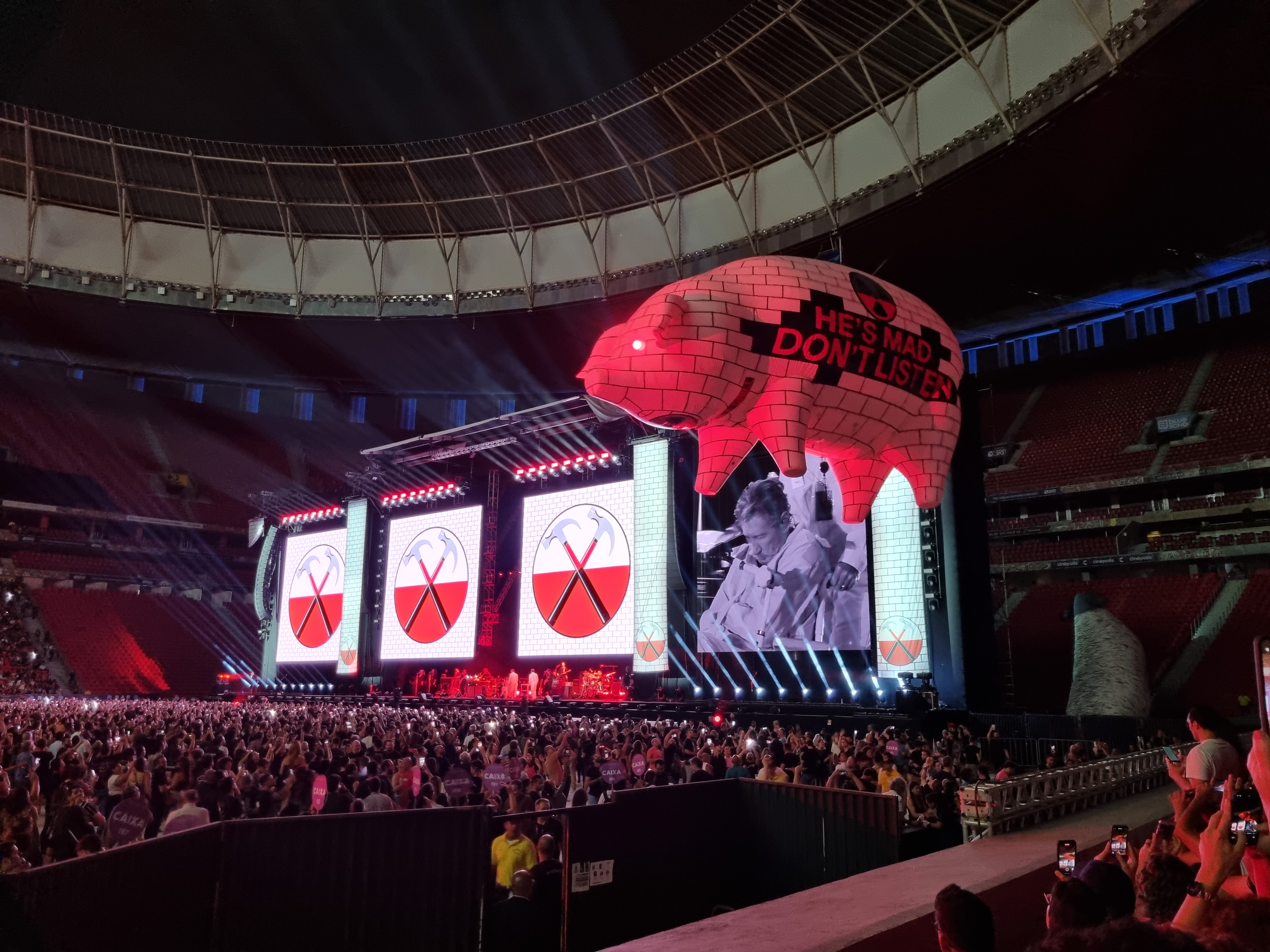
Concerts in Latin American stadiums saw a different stage with square screens showing the visual content.

In September 2022, contrary to what Waters expressed previously, the first concerts in Europe were officially announced on his website and social media. Concerts took place between March and June 2023. In May 2023, Waters announced concerts in stadiums in South America, which took place between October and December 2023. These concerts didn't feature the 360° stage from previous legs, but a traditional stage instead. The South American leg saw other differences in the theatrics of the show itself. "Comfortably Numb 2022" included Waters pacing back and forth in front of the stage screens to sing, while wearing an all-white doctor's robe. And during "In The Flesh", where Waters used to come out dressed as the character Pink from The Wall, Waters was rolled out on stage in a white wheelchair, dressed in an all-white straitjacket. He appeared frail and weak until he was "injected" with a syringe and peaked up in time to sing. Although no opening acts were announced for the whole tour, the shows in Santiago had local artists Rosa Quispe Huanca and Inti-Illimani opening each date.

== Controversies ==
=== Pulling of ads by MLB ===
In 2020, Major League Baseball stopped advertising Waters' This Is Not a Drill concerts after receiving criticism from Jewish advocacy groups. Jewish organisation B'nai B'rith criticised MLB's decision to sponsor ticket pre-sales for the tour and wrote that the Boycott, Divestment and Sanctions movement, which Waters joined in 2011, "far exceed the boundaries of civil discourse".

=== The Weeknd comments ===
In July 2022, during an interview with Canadian newspaper The Globe and Mail, Waters questioned journalist Brad Wheeler about the lack of coverage of the first of his two shows in Toronto, Canada. When replied that the date coincided with the opening show of the Weeknd's After Hours til Dawn Tour (which was ultimately postponed) and that his "wasn’t the biggest in town that night", Waters declared not to know who the Weeknd is, and questioned why his concert was not reviewed on the following night. He continued by saying his statement was not "a personal attack", adding "with all due respect to the Weeknd or Drake or any of them, I am far, far, far more important than any of them will ever be, however many billions of streams they’ve got. There is stuff going on here that is fundamentally important to all of our lives". Rolling Stone commented on the controversy that "it is unclear by which metric Waters measures importance".

=== Stance on Russo-Ukrainian War ===
In September 2022, Waters wrote an open letter to Ukrainian first lady Olena Zelenska in response to her interview in Sunday with Laura Kuenssberg. In the letter, Waters criticised the country's stance in the Russo-Ukrainian War, blaming the West and Washington particularly for supplying Ukraine with weapons and "extreme nationalists" for having "set your country on the path to this disastrous war", while calling for an end to the conflict. After Zelenska replied with a tweet, Waters posted a second letter calling for an end of the armed conflict, and the start of negotiations.

In reaction to the letters, Tauron Arena in Kraków, Poland, stated that the concerts in the venue, which were to be held on 21 and 22 April 2023, would no longer take place, with an official saying "Roger Waters' manager decided to withdraw... without giving any reason". Waters was also declared persona non grata in the city after a proposal from Łukasz Wantuch, a member of the Kraków City Council. Waters posted an open letter on social media stating that the decision to cancel was not his and that, if the cancellation was confirmed, "it will be a sad loss for me, because I have been looking forward to sharing my message of love with the people of Poland", and that Wantuch's "draconian censoring of my work will deny them the opportunity to make up their own minds".

Waters' name appears on Myrotvorets, a controversial website that maintains a list of people it deems enemies of Ukraine. Critics, including Waters, describe Myrotvorets as a "kill list".

=== Antisemitism allegations and attempts to cancel German concerts ===
In 2023, due to Waters' comments, German cities announced plans to cancel shows, which were unsuccessful. In February, the Frankfurt city council released a statement announcing the cancellation of the concert in the city, to take place on 28 May at the Festhalle, calling Waters "one of the world’s most well-known antisemites". A coalition of parties in Munich's city council also filed a motion for Waters’ concert at the city's Olympiahalle on 21 May to be cancelled, and a similar motion was tabled in Cologne in February, with management of the Lanxess Arena claiming "there is currently no legal basis for an extraordinary termination" of Waters’ concert there. Munich mayor Dieter Reiter said in March that it's "unspeakable" that Waters should appear in city, and so close to the site of the 1972 Munich Olympics massacre, however, he declared that "we do not currently see any legally secure possibility... to reverse the decision already made". The city planned shows of solidarity promoting tolerance on the same day as the show, and called for a public boycott instead.

Waters threatened legal action against both cities, and the concerts remained on his website. On 3 April, he confirmed in his website the filing of a suit in Frankfurt, stating "I’m coming, bringing my message of love and peace to all my brothers and sisters". On 24 April, the court ruled in Waters' favour and lifted the ban. During his first concert in Berlin on 17 May, Waters reacted through a pre-recorded message in the screen, stating "A court in Frankfurt has ruled that I am not an anti-Semite. Excellent. Just to be clear, I condemn anti-Semitism unreservedly".

Online, and at later shows during the tour, a statement was projected before the show saying:

My recent performance in Berlin has attracted bad faith attacks from those who want to smear and silence me because they disagree with my political views and moral principles.

The elements of my performance that have been questioned are quite clearly a statement in opposition to fascism, injustice, and bigotry in all its forms. Attempts to portray those elements as something disingenuous are politically motivated. The depiction of an unhinged fascist demagogue has been a feature of my shows since Pink Floyd's 'The Wall' in 1980.

I have spent my entire life speaking out against authoritarianism and oppression wherever I see it. When I was a child after the war, the name Anne Frank was often spoken in our house, she became a permanent reminder for what happens when fascism is left unchecked. My parents fought the Nazis in World War II, with my father [Eric Fletcher Waters] paying the ultimate price.

Regardless of the consequences of the attacks against me, I will continue to condemn injustice and all those who perpetrate it.

— Roger Waters,

== Setlist ==
The following set list was obtained from the concert held on 6 July 2022 at the PPG Paints Arena in Pittsburgh.

Set 1

1. "Comfortably Numb 2022"
2. "The Happiest Days of Our Lives"
3. "Another Brick in the Wall, Part 2"
4. "Another Brick in the Wall, Part 3"
5. "The Powers That Be"
6. "The Bravery of Being Out of Range"
7. "The Bar"
8. "Have a Cigar"
9. "Wish You Were Here"
10. "Shine On You Crazy Diamond (Parts VI–IX)"
11. "Sheep"

Set 2

12. "In the Flesh"
13. "Run Like Hell"
14. "Déjà Vu"
15. "Is This the Life We Really Want?"
16. "Money"
17. "Us and Them"
18. "Any Colour You Like"
19. "Brain Damage"
20. "Eclipse"

Encore

21. "Two Suns in the Sunset"
22. "The Bar" (reprise)
23. "Outside the Wall"

=== Notes ===
- During some concerts, part VIII of "Shine On You Crazy Diamond" was replaced with part V.
- During the concerts in Paris on 4 May 2023, and in Hamburg on 7 May 2023, Waters performed "Broken Bones" after "The Bravery of Being Out of Range".
- During the concert in Prague on 25 May 2023, Waters performed an excerpt of "Stop" after "Run Like Hell".
- During the concerts in Frankfurt on 28 May 2023, and in Birmingham on 31 May 2023, "In The Flesh" was performed with Waters not dressed as Pink from The Wall, and didn't include the mock machine-gun firing.
- The South American leg saw Waters opt for a "He's Gone Mad" theme during "In The Flesh", where he came out wheeled in a straitjacket instead of his characteristic "Pink" character garb.

== Recordings and broadcasts ==
The tour debuted a new stripped down "haunting organ and vocals version" of "Comfortably Numb" as the show's opener every night. The recording was released on 17 November 2022, titled "Comfortably Numb 2022", as the lead single from his album The Lockdown Sessions.

In April 2023, Waters announced that his concert at the O_{2} Arena in Prague on 25 May would be a cinema event. The film Roger Waters: This Is Not a Drill was directed by long-time collaborator Sean Evans, and broadcast live in more than 1,500 cinemas across more than 50 countries. Tickets were released on 25 April. The second concert in Buenos Aires on 22 November was livestreamed in Argentine television through cable operator Flow.

On 5 June 2025, Waters announced This Is Not a Drill – Live From Prague, a live album and film chronicling both his performances in the city, including the performance previously livestreamed. The film premiered in cinemas worldwide on 23 and 27 July, and was released on 1 August in CD, LP and home video.

== Boxscore data ==
The concerts in the United States and Canada ranked #31 on Billboards Boxscore Charts, grossing $66,330,771. Those shows sold 519,362 tickets.

== Tour dates ==
List of 2022 concerts, showing date, city, country, venue, attendance and gross
Date	City	Country	Venue	Attendance	Gross
6 July 2022	Pittsburgh	United States	PPG Paints Arena	10,447 / 15,479	$1,073,335
8 July 2022	Toronto	Canada	Scotiabank Arena	28,754 / 33,748	$3,193,049
9 July 2022	Toronto	Canada	Scotiabank Arena	28,754 / 33,748	$3,193,049
12 July 2022	Boston	United States	TD Garden	15,679 / 15,679	$2,515,971
15 July 2022	Montreal	Canada	Bell Centre	18,893 / 19,433	$2,268,886
17 July 2022	Quebec City	Canada	Videotron Centre	15,135 / 17,972	$1,423,818
20 July 2022	Albany	United States	MVP Arena	9,513 / 12,472	$966,516
23 July 2022	Detroit	United States	Little Caesars Arena	11,486 / 16,389	$1,398,525
26 July 2022	Chicago	United States	United Center	14,707 / 16,644	$2,153,151
28 July 2022	Milwaukee	United States	Fiserv Forum	11,025 / 13,705	$1,428,420
30 July 2022	Minneapolis	United States	Target Center	10,913 / 16,165	$1,382,461
2 August 2022	Cincinnati	United States	Heritage Bank Center	10,716 / 15,021	$1,206,615
5 August 2022	Philadelphia	United States	Wells Fargo Center	25,864 / 32,394	$3,074,885
6 August 2022	Philadelphia	United States	Wells Fargo Center	25,864 / 32,394	$3,074,885
10 August 2022	Columbus	United States	Nationwide Arena	7,955 / 16,814	$902,920
13 August 2022	Elmont	United States	UBS Arena	10,056 / 11,500	$928,566
16 August 2022	Washington, D.C.	United States	Capital One Arena	11,322 / 15,757	$1,685,710
18 August 2022	Raleigh	United States	PNC Arena	10,106 / 15,252	$1,269,918
20 August 2022	Atlanta	United States	State Farm Arena	11,676 / 14,445	$1,308,458
23 August 2022	Miami	United States	FTX Arena	13,225 / 17,139	$1,722,142
25 August 2022	Orlando	United States	Amway Center	12,424 / 15,742	$1,642,724
27 August 2022	Nashville	United States	Bridgestone Arena	10,600 / 14,588	$1,329,482
30 August 2022	New York City	United States	Madison Square Garden	29,314 / 34,082	$4,327,748
31 August 2022	New York City	United States	Madison Square Garden	29,314 / 34,082	$4,327,748
3 September 2022	Kansas City	United States	T-Mobile Center	11,316 / 15,463	$1,308,795
6 September 2022	Denver	United States	Ball Arena	15,372 / 16,034	$2,003,945
8 September 2022	Salt Lake City	United States	Vivint Arena	11,686 / 13,983	$1,450,457
10 September 2022	Portland	United States	Moda Center	14,252 / 16,434	$1,706,704
13 September 2022	Edmonton	Canada	Rogers Place	11,527 / 15,706	$1,114,840
15 September 2022	Vancouver	Canada	Rogers Arena	16,105 / 16,105	$1,955,650
17 September 2022	Tacoma	United States	Tacoma Dome	14,951 / 18,365	$1,997,075
20 September 2022	Sacramento	United States	Golden 1 Center	11,455 / 14,479	$1,386,609
23 September 2022	San Francisco	United States	Chase Center	26,362 / 30,625	$3,724,860
24 September 2022	San Francisco	United States	Chase Center	26,362 / 30,625	$3,724,860
27 September 2022	Los Angeles	United States	Crypto.com Arena	30,044 / 30,044	$4,680,308
28 September 2022	Los Angeles	United States	Crypto.com Arena	30,044 / 30,044	$4,680,308
1 October 2022	Las Vegas	United States	T-Mobile Arena	15,161 / 17,460	$1,665,199
3 October 2022	Glendale	United States	Desert Diamond Arena	9,029 / 13,918	$1,080,686
6 October 2022	Austin	United States	Moody Center	12,728 / 12,728	$1,541,375
8 October 2022	Dallas	United States	American Airlines Center	15,832 / 16,569	$2,410,363
11 October 2022	Monterrey	Mexico	Arena Monterrey	17,000 / 17,000	$993,675
14 October 2022	Mexico City	Mexico	Palacio de los Deportes	43,764 / 43,764	$3,488,706
15 October 2022	Mexico City	Mexico	Palacio de los Deportes	43,764 / 43,764	$3,488,706

List of 2023 concerts, showing date, city, country, venue, attendance and gross
Date	City	Country	Venue	Attendance	Gross
17 March 2023	Lisbon	Portugal	Altice Arena	34,021	$2,834,980
18 March 2023	Lisbon	Portugal	Altice Arena	34,021	$2,834,980
21 March 2023	Barcelona	Spain	Palau Sant Jordi	—N/a	—N/a
23 March 2023	Madrid	Spain	WiZink Center	—N/a	—N/a
24 March 2023	Madrid	Spain	WiZink Center	—N/a	—N/a
27 March 2023	Milan	Italy	Mediolanum Forum	—N/a	—N/a
28 March 2023	Milan	Italy	Mediolanum Forum	—N/a	—N/a
31 March 2023	Milan	Italy	Mediolanum Forum	—N/a	—N/a
1 April 2023	Milan	Italy	Mediolanum Forum	—N/a	—N/a
4 April 2023	Amsterdam	Netherlands	Ziggo Dome	—N/a	—N/a
6 April 2023	Amsterdam	Netherlands	Ziggo Dome	—N/a	—N/a
7 April 2023	Amsterdam	Netherlands	Ziggo Dome	—N/a	—N/a
11 April 2023	Oslo	Norway	Telenor Arena	—N/a	—N/a
12 April 2023	Oslo	Norway	Telenor Arena	—N/a	—N/a
15 April 2023	Stockholm	Sweden	Tele2 Arena	—N/a	—N/a
17 April 2023	Copenhagen	Denmark	Royal Arena	—N/a	—N/a
18 April 2023	Copenhagen	Denmark	Royal Arena	—N/a	—N/a
21 April 2023	Bologna	Italy	Unipol Arena	—N/a	—N/a
23 April 2023	Budapest	Hungary	MVM Dome	—N/a	—N/a
25 April 2023	Zürich	Switzerland	Hallenstadion	—N/a	—N/a
28 April 2023	Bologna	Italy	Unipol Arena	—N/a	—N/a
29 April 2023	Bologna	Italy	Unipol Arena	—N/a	—N/a
3 May 2023	Paris	France	Accor Arena	—N/a	—N/a
4 May 2023	Paris	France	Accor Arena	—N/a	—N/a
7 May 2023	Hamburg	Germany	Barclays Arena	—N/a	—N/a
9 May 2023	Cologne	Germany	Lanxess Arena	—N/a	—N/a
12 May 2023	Lille	France	Stade Pierre-Mauroy	—N/a	—N/a
14 May 2023	Antwerp	Belgium	Sportpaleis	—N/a	—N/a
17 May 2023	Berlin	Germany	Mercedes-Benz Arena	—N/a	—N/a
18 May 2023	Berlin	Germany	Mercedes-Benz Arena	—N/a	—N/a
21 May 2023	Munich	Germany	Olympiahalle	—N/a	—N/a
24 May 2023	Prague	Czech Republic	O_{2} Arena	—N/a	—N/a
25 May 2023	Prague	Czech Republic	O_{2} Arena	—N/a	—N/a
28 May 2023	Frankfurt	Germany	Festhalle	—N/a	—N/a
31 May 2023	Birmingham	England	Utilita Arena	—N/a	—N/a
2 June 2023	Glasgow	Scotland	OVO Hydro	—N/a	—N/a
3 June 2023	Glasgow	Scotland	OVO Hydro	—N/a	—N/a
6 June 2023	London	England	The O_{2} Arena	—N/a	—N/a
7 June 2023	London	England	The O_{2} Arena	—N/a	—N/a
10 June 2023	Manchester	England	AO Arena	—N/a	—N/a
24 October 2023	Brasília	Brazil	Arena BRB Mané Garrincha	—N/a	—N/a
28 October 2023	Rio de Janeiro	Brazil	Estádio Olímpico Nilton Santos	—N/a	—N/a
1 November 2023	Porto Alegre	Brazil	Arena do Grêmio	—N/a	—N/a
4 November 2023	Curitiba	Brazil	Arena da Baixada	—N/a	—N/a
8 November 2023	Belo Horizonte	Brazil	Mineirão Stadium	—N/a	—N/a
11 November 2023	São Paulo	Brazil	Allianz Parque	—N/a	—N/a
12 November 2023	São Paulo	Brazil	Allianz Parque	—N/a	—N/a
17 November 2023	Montevideo	Uruguay	Estadio Centenario	—N/a	—N/a
21 November 2023	Buenos Aires	Argentina	Estadio River Plate	—N/a	—N/a
22 November 2023	Buenos Aires	Argentina	Estadio River Plate	—N/a	—N/a
25 November 2023	Santiago	Chile	Estadio Monumental	—N/a	—N/a
26 November 2023	Santiago	Chile	Estadio Monumental	—N/a	—N/a
29 November 2023	Lima	Peru	National Stadium	—N/a	—N/a
2 December 2023	San José	Costa Rica	Estadio Nacional de Costa Rica	—N/a	—N/a
5 December 2023	Bogotá	Colombia	Coliseo Live	—N/a	—N/a
9 December 2023	Quito	Ecuador	Estadio Olímpico Atahualpa	—N/a	—N/a
Total				—	—

=== Cancelled shows ===
List of cancelled concerts, showing date, city, country, venue and reason for cancellation
Date	City	Country	Venue	Reason
21 April 2023	Kraków	Poland	Tauron Arena	Cancelled due to stance on Russo-Ukrainian War
22 April 2023	Kraków	Poland	Tauron Arena	Cancelled due to stance on Russo-Ukrainian War

== Personnel ==
Tour band

- Roger Waters – vocals, acoustic guitar, electric guitar, piano, bass guitar
- Jon Carin – keyboards, guitar, pedal steel guitar, backing vocals, Marxophone
- Dave Kilminster – guitar, backing vocals
- Jonathan Wilson – guitar, backing vocals, lead vocals on "Money" and "Us and Them"
- Gus Seyffert – bass guitar, guitar, backing vocals, accordion
- Joey Waronker – drums, percussion
- Amanda Belair – vocals, percussion
- Shanay Johnson – vocals, percussion
- Robert Walter – Hammond B3 organ, keyboards, piano, melodica
- Seamus Blake - saxophone, clarinet

Notes

- The touring band was confirmed on their appearance on The Late Show with Stephen Colbert in June.
- Producer and saxophonist Ian Ritchie confirmed that while he was intended to be part of the tour, he had to step down during rehearsals due to health issues.
