= Roger Waters: This Is Not a Drill – Live from Prague =

- Film poster
- Directed by: Roger Waters; Sean Evans
- Written by: Roger Waters
- Screenplay by: Roger Waters; Sean Evans
- Produced by: Roger Waters
- Starring: Roger Waters; Dave Kilminster; Jon Carin; Jonathan Wilson; Joey Waronker; Gus Seyffert; Robert Walter; Shanay Johnson; Amanda Belair; Seamus Blake
- Music by: Roger Waters
- Distributed by: Sony Music Vision · Trafalgar Releasing
- Release dates: 23 July 2025 (Various countries); 27 July 2025 (Various countries)
- Running time: 165 minutes
- Country: United Kingdom
- Language: English

Roger Waters: This Is Not a Drill – Live from Prague is a 2025 British concert film and live album by English musician Roger Waters, founding member of Pink Floyd. The film was directed by Waters and Sean Evans, and captures a performance from the european leg of Waters' first farewell tour of the same name, filmed at the O_{2} Arena in Prague on 24 and 25 May 2023.

== Release ==
The film was released in cinemas worldwide on 23 and 27 July 2025, distributed by Sony Music Vision and Trafalgar Releasing. The accompanying live album and home video, released on 1 August 2025 by Legacy Recordings and Sony Music, was made available in multiple formats including 4-LP, 2-CD, Blu-ray, DVD, and digital download.

Roger Waters: This Is Not a Drill – Live from Prague

Live album by Roger Waters
- Released: 1 August 2025
- Recorded: 24–25 May 2023
- Venues: O₂ Arena, Prague
- Genre: Progressive rock
- Length: 134:41
- Label: Legacy Recordings
- Producer: Roger Waters

Roger Waters chronology
The Dark Side of the Moon Redux Live (2025)	Roger Waters: This Is Not a Drill – Live from Prague (2025)

== Critical reception ==
Professional ratings
Review scores
Source	Rating
Laut.de	3/5 stars

Emil Dröll of Laut.de observed that the project embodies what Waters represents: it is "uncomfortable, ambitious, musically brilliant", yet "incredibly exhausting" on a personal level. Dröll felt there is little room for "individuality" and the audience is merely "handled", which is both a positive sign and a source of disappointment.

== Track listing ==
All tracks are written by Roger Waters, except where noted.

Roger Waters: This Is Not a Drill – Live from Prague track listing
No.	Title	Writer(s)	Length
1.	"Introduction"		1:07
2.	"Comfortably Numb 2022"	David Gilmour; Waters	7:25
3.	"The Happiest Days of Our Lives"		1:35
4.	"Another Brick in the Wall (Part 2)"		2:13
5.	"Another Brick in the Wall (Part 3)"		1:50
6.	"The Powers That Be"		4:45
7.	"The Bravery of Being Out of Range"		9:57
8.	"The Bar (Part 1)"		4:32
9.	"Have a Cigar"		5:14
10.	"Wish You Were Here"	Gilmour; Waters	5:08
11.	"Shine On You Crazy Diamond"	Gilmour; Waters; Richard Wright	8:17
12.	"Sheep"		10:21
13.	"In the Flesh"		4:08
14.	"Run Like Hell"	Gilmour; Waters	6:37
15.	"Déjà Vu"		7:47
16.	"Is This the Life We Really Want?"		5:49
17.	"Money"		6:23
18.	"Us and Them"	Wright; Waters	7:32
19.	"Any Colour You Like"	Gilmour; Wright; Nick Mason	3:25
20.	"Brain Damage"		3:50
21.	"Eclipse"		6:40
22.	"Two Suns in the Sunset"		10:37
23.	"The Bar (Part 2)"		4:42
24.	"Outside the Wall"		4:47
Total length:			134:41

- All tracks are noted as "Live From Prague May 2023".

== Performers and personnel ==
- Roger Waters – vocals, bass, guitars
- Gus Seyffert – backing vocals, guitars, bass
- Jonathan Wilson – guitars, vocals
- Dave Kilminster – guitars, backing vocals
- Jon Carin – keyboards, synthesizers, guitars, backing vocals
- Robert Walter – keyboards
- Joey Waronker – drums
- Shanay Johnson – vocals
- Amanda Belair – vocals
- Seamus Blake – saxophone

== Charts ==
Chart performance
Chart (2025)	Peak position
Austrian Albums (Ö3 Austria)	2
Belgian Albums (Ultratop Flanders)	17
Belgian Albums (Ultratop Wallonia)	6
Croatian International Albums (HDU)	5
Dutch Albums (Album Top 100)	8
Finnish Albums (Suomen virallinen lista)	46
French Albums (SNEP)	50
French Rock & Metal Albums (SNEP)	1
German Albums (Offizielle Top 100)	1
Italian Albums (FIMI)	12
Norwegian Albums (IFPI Norge)	61
Polish Albums (ZPAV)	4
Portuguese Albums (AFP)	18
Scottish Albums (Official Charts)	2
Spanish Albums (PROMUSICAE)	46
Swiss Albums (Schweizer Hitparade)	5
UK Albums (Official Charts)	20
UK Rock & Metal Albums (Official Charts)	1
