= The Lockdown Sessions =

The Lockdown Sessions may refer to:

- Lockdown Sessions (Lara Fabian album), a 2020 album by Lara Fabian
- Lockdown Sessions, a 2022 EP by Machine Gun Kelly
- The Lockdown Sessions (Elton John album), a 2021 album by Elton John
- The Lockdown Sessions (Roger Waters album), a 2022 album by Roger Waters
