= Kilminster =

Kilminster may refer to:

== People ==
- Dave Kilminster, a British guitarist who toured with Keith Emerson and Roger Waters
- For Ian Fraser Kilmister, known as "Lemmy", an English musician and founder of heavy metal band Motorhead, see Lemmy Kilmister.
