= Us + Them Tour =

2017–18 concert tour by Roger Waters

- Tour by Roger Waters
- Promotional poster for the tour
- Location: Central America; Europe; North America; Oceania; South America
- Associated album: Dark Side of the Moon and Is This the Life We Really Want?
- Start date: 21 May 2017
- End date: 9 December 2018
- Legs: 5
- No. of shows: 157
- Box office: US $261,784,386

Roger Waters concert chronology
- The Wall Live (2010–13); Us + Them Tour (2017–18); This Is Not a Drill (2022–23)

The Us + Them Tour was a concert tour by the rock musician Roger Waters. The tour visited the United States, Canada, New Zealand, Australia and countries in Europe and Latin America, showcasing songs from Waters' career with Pink Floyd and his 2017 album Is This the Life We Really Want? It opened on 26 May 2017 in Kansas City, United States and ended on 9 December 2018 in Monterrey, Mexico.

== Background ==
In mid-October 2016, Waters announced that he would return to North America in 2017 with a pioneering new tour named "Us + Them", stating: "We are going to take a new show on the road, the content is very secret. It'll be a mixture of stuff from my long career, stuff from my years with Pink Floyd, some new things. Probably 75% of it will be old material and 25% will be new, but it will be all connected by a general theme. It will be a cool show, I promise you. It'll be spectacular like all my shows have been." The tour is named after the track "Us and Them", from Pink Floyd's 1973 album The Dark Side of the Moon.

== Personnel ==
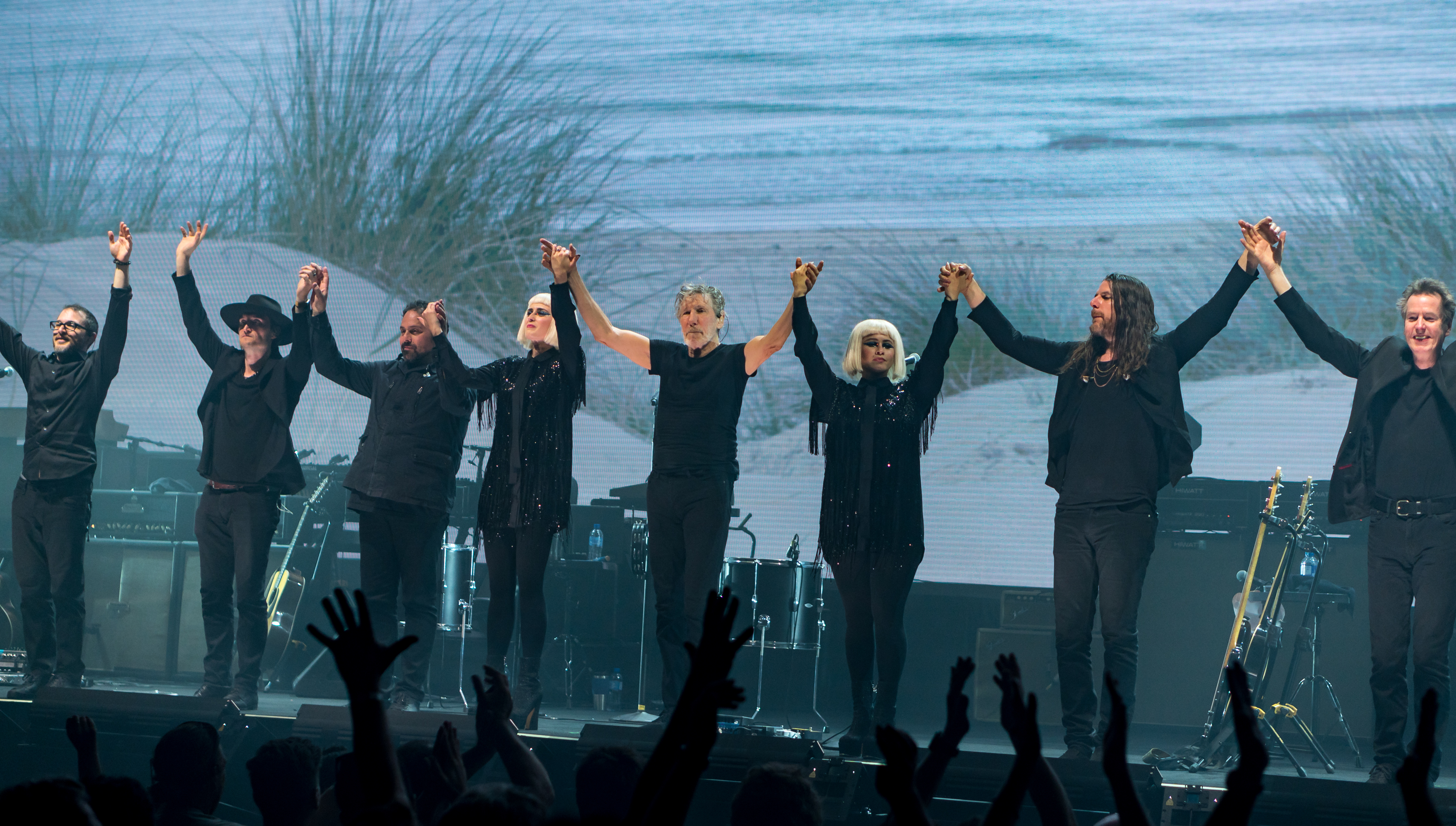
The touring band saying good night on 24 January 2018 in New Zealand

- Roger Waters – lead vocals, bass, acoustic guitar, electric guitar on "Welcome to the Machine" and "Picture That"
- Dave Kilminster – acoustic and electric guitars, talk box, backing vocals
- Jon Carin – piano, keyboards, programming, lap steel guitar, acoustic and electric guitars, backing vocals
- Gus Seyffert – acoustic and electric guitars, bass, backing vocals
- Jonathan Wilson – acoustic and electric guitars, lead and backing vocals
- Drew Erickson – piano, keyboards, Hammond organ (withdrew from tour before Newark date, due to injury)
- Bo Koster – piano, keyboards, Hammond organ (replaced an injured Erickson, from Newark date onwards)
- Ian Ritchie – saxophone, bass
- Joey Waronker – drums, percussion
- Jess Wolfe – backing vocals, percussion, lead vocals on "The Great Gig in the Sky" and "Mother"
- Holly Laessig – backing vocals, percussion, lead vocals on "The Great Gig in the Sky" and "Mother"

== Set list ==
The following set list was obtained from the concert held on September 12, 2017 at the Barclays Center in Brooklyn. It does not represent all concerts for the duration of the tour.

Set 1

1. "Speak to Me"
2. "Breathe"
3. "One of These Days"
4. "Time / "Breathe" (Reprise)
5. "The Great Gig in the Sky"
6. "Welcome to the Machine"
7. "When We Were Young"
8. "Déjà Vu"
9. "The Last Refugee"
10. "Picture That"
11. "Wish You Were Here"
12. "The Happiest Days of Our Lives"
13. "Another Brick in the Wall, Part 2"
14. "Another Brick in the Wall, Part 3"

Set 2

15. "Dogs"
16. "Pigs (Three Different Ones)"
17. "Money"
18. "Us and Them"
19. "Smell the Roses"
20. "Brain Damage"
21. "Eclipse"

Encore

22. "Vera"
23. "Bring the Boys Back Home"
24. "Comfortably Numb"

=== Notes ===
The following songs were performed during the tour, with each song noted the city and date it was performed:

- "Vera" / "Bring the Boys Back Home" (medley) (all shows until 11 August 2017; Oslo, 14 August 2018; Stockholm, 18 August 2018)
- "Mother" (Nashville, 13 August 2017; Boston, 27 & 28 September 2017; Québec, 6 & 7 October 2017; Ottawa, 10 October 2017; Toronto, 13 October 2017; Montreal, 16, 17 & 18 October 2017; Winnipeg, 22 October 2017; Vancouver, 28 October 2017; Auckland, 24 & 26 January 2018; Dunedin, 30 January 2018; Sydney, 2 & 3 February 2018; Melbourne, 10, 11 & 13 February 2018; Adelaide, 16 February 2018; Bologna, 21, 24 & 25 April 2018; Budapest, 2 May 2018; Zagreb, 6 May 2018; Lyon, 9 May 2018; Antwerp, 11 May 2018; Rome, 14 July 2018; Kraków, 3 August 2018; São Paulo, 9 & 10 November 2018; Brasília, 13 October 2018; Rio de Janeiro, 24 October 2018; San José, 24 November 2018)
- "Wait for Her" / "Oceans Apart" / "Part of Me Died" (medley) (Vancouver, 29 October 2017; Perth, 20 February 2018; Bologna, 22 April 2018; Prague, 28 April 2018; Antwerp, 12 May 2018; Lisbon, 20 May 2018; Amsterdam, 18 June 2018; Glasgow, 29 June 2018; Gdańsk, 5 August 2018)
- "Danny Boy" (Dublin, 26 & 27 June 2018)
- "Broken Bones" (Copenhagen, 10 August 2018; Oslo, 15 August 2018; Helsinki, 21 August 2018; Bogotá, 21 November 2018)
- "The Bravery of Being Out of Range" (Riga, 24 August 2018; Kaunas, 26 August 2018; St. Petersburg, 29 August 2018; Moscow, 31 August 2018)
- "Two Suns in the Sunset" (Salvador, 17 October 2018; Belo Horizonte, 21 October 2018; Montevideo, 3 November 2018; Lima, 17 November 2018)
- "The Gunner's Dream" (Santiago, 14 November 2018)

== Reception ==
As of July 2017, the Us + Them Tour, which had cost $4 million to produce, had grossed over $25 million in North America and ranked 19th in highest grossing shows in North America for that year. The tour has been highly praised for its setlist, which is heavy on songs from Waters' tenure in Pink Floyd, along with its visuals and technology.

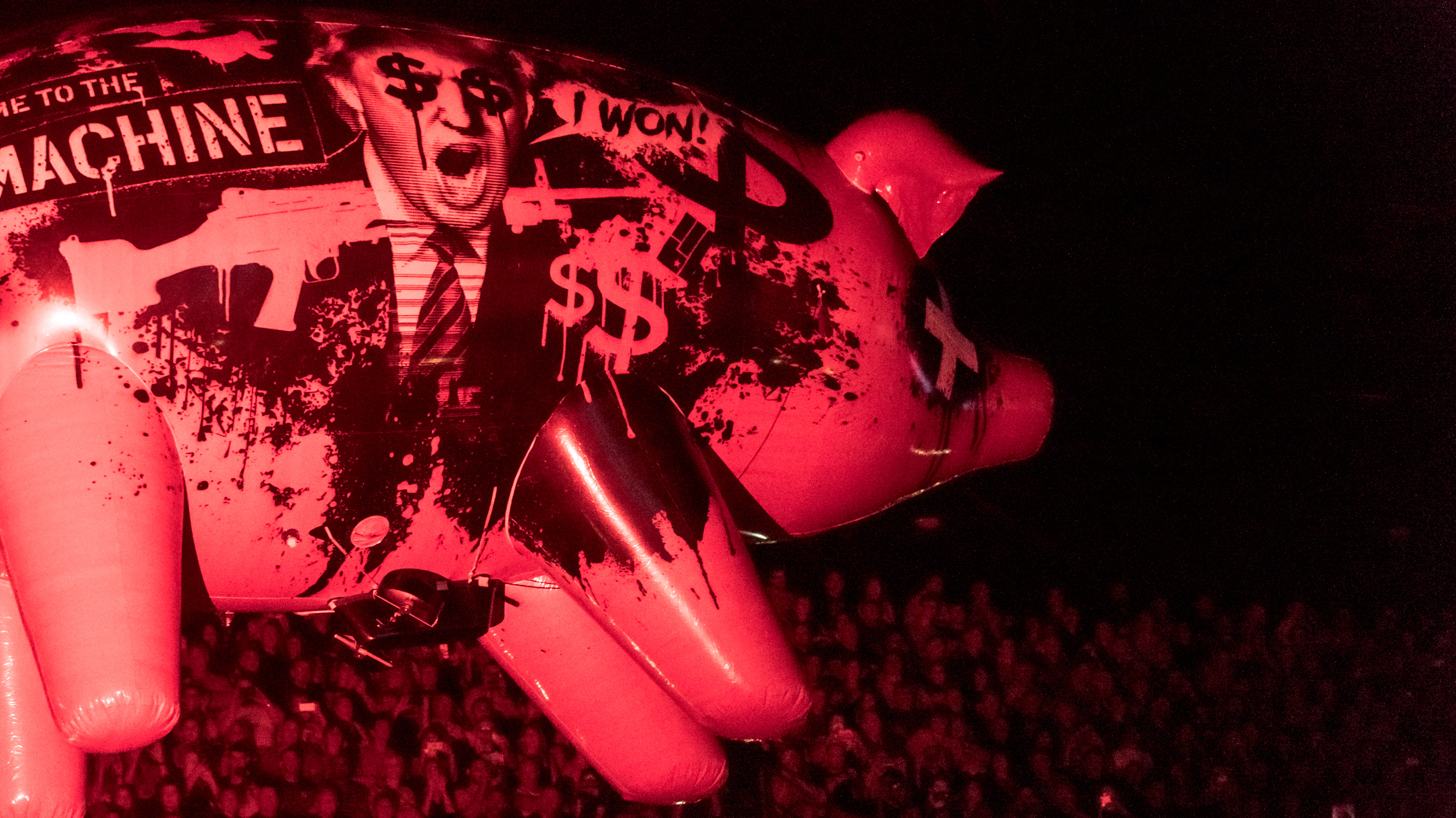
Anti-Donald Trump imagery from the tour

One portion of the show features extensive anti-Donald Trump imagery, which led some attendees to boo or even walk out of the show. Waters responded to the anti-Trump critics by saying, "I find it slightly surprising that anybody could have been listening to my songs for 50 years without understanding", and said to those critics if they didn't like what he was doing, "Go see Katy Perry or watch the Kardashians. I don't care." Waters also said that due to his anti-Trump images that he lost sponsors such as American Express, who refused to have their company associated with his shows in the U.S., although they are still sponsoring the tour in Canada, according to Waters. In Brazil, Waters similarly attacked then presidential candidate Jair Bolsonaro and was also booed by members of the crowd during his tours. Some imagery mentioned "neo-fascism is on the rise", and also cited multiple other politicians such as Vladimir Putin and Marine Le Pen.

Waters also was met with some backlash, boycotts and even attempts to cancel his show by some lawmakers in various cities due to his anti-Israel boycott which some felt was anti-semitic. Prior to his performances in Washington, D.C., the Jewish Community Relations Council of Greater Washington produced a video criticizing Waters' support of BDS, the boycott, divestment and sanctions movement that compares the country's treatment of Palestinians to apartheid. In October 2016, Waters lost $4 million in sponsorship after American Express refused to fund the tour due to his anti-Israel rhetoric at a previous festival sponsored by the financial company. In November 2016, Citibank joined American Express in cutting ties to Waters.

== Movie and live album ==
The Amsterdam shows of 18 – 23 June 2018 at the Ziggo Dome were filmed for Roger Waters: Us + Them. The movie was premiered at Venice Film Festival in 2019. A live album with the songs from the movie was released on 2 October 2020.

== Tour dates ==
Date	City	Country	Venue	Attendance	Gross
North America
21 May 2017 (Note: Production rehearsal.)	East Rutherford	United States	Meadowlands Arena	—N/a	—N/a
26 May 2017	Kansas City	United States	Sprint Center	12,077 / 12,077	$1,412,641
28 May 2017	Louisville	United States	KFC Yum! Center	11,760 / 11,760	$1,336,338
30 May 2017	St. Louis	United States	Scottrade Center	11,682 / 11,682	$1,083,554
1 June 2017	Tulsa	United States	BOK Center	10,031 / 10,031	$1,059,057
3 June 2017	Denver	United States	Pepsi Center	22,731 / 22,731	$2,619,769
4 June 2017	Denver	United States	Pepsi Center	22,731 / 22,731	$2,619,769
7 June 2017	San Jose	United States	SAP Center	12,230 / 12,230	$1,977,011
10 June 2017	Oakland	United States	Oracle Arena	12,665 / 12,665	$1,708,813
12 June 2017	Sacramento	United States	Golden 1 Center	12,980 / 12,980	$1,635,413
14 June 2017	Glendale	United States	Gila River Arena	11,682 / 11,682	$1,422,541
16 June 2017	Las Vegas	United States	T-Mobile Arena	12,601 / 12,601	$1,767,456
20 June 2017	Los Angeles	United States	Staples Center	38,003 / 38,003 (Note: The score data is combined from the shows held at the Staples Center from 20, 21 & 27 June 2017 respectively.)	$5,613,448
21 June 2017	Los Angeles	United States	Staples Center	38,003 / 38,003	$5,613,448
24 June 2017	Tacoma	United States	Tacoma Dome	18,073 / 18,073	$2,337,871
25 June 2017	Portland	United States	Moda Center	11,547 / 11,547	$1,223,572
27 June 2017	Los Angeles	United States	Staples Center		
1 July 2017	San Antonio	United States	AT&T Center	11,170 / 12,000	$1,168,987
3 July 2017	Dallas	United States	American Airlines Center	13,002 / 13,002	$1,930,195
6 July 2017	Houston	United States	Toyota Center	9,413 / 10,500	$1,296,710
8 July 2017	New Orleans	United States	Smoothie King Center	11,397 / 11,397	$1,179,322
11 July 2017	Tampa	United States	Amalie Arena	12,750 / 12,750	$1,552,781
13 July 2017	Miami	United States	American Airlines Arena	12,742 / 12,742	$1,597,676
16 July 2017	Duluth	United States	Infinite Energy Arena	9,458 / 9,458	$1,320,554
18 July 2017	Greensboro	United States	Greensboro Coliseum	12,632 / 12,632	$1,316,674
20 July 2017	Columbus	United States	Nationwide Arena	13,198 / 13,198	$1,615,737
22 July 2017	Chicago	United States	United Center	32,414 / 36,000 (Note: The score data is combined from the shows held at the United Center from 22, 23 & 28 July 2017 respectively.)	$4,162,170
23 July 2017	Chicago	United States	United Center	32,414 / 36,000	$4,162,170
26 July 2017	Saint Paul	United States	Xcel Energy Center	12,875 / 12,875	$1,755,448
28 July 2017	Chicago	United States	United Center		
29 July 2017	Milwaukee	United States	BMO Harris Bradley Center	12,039 / 12,500	$1,298,257
2 August 2017	Auburn Hills	United States	The Palace of Auburn Hills	12,138 / 12,138	$1,330,313
4 August 2017	Washington, D.C.	United States	Verizon Center	20,022 / 22,000	$2,650,410
5 August 2017	Washington, D.C.	United States	Verizon Center	20,022 / 22,000	$2,650,410
8 August 2017	Philadelphia	United States	Wells Fargo Center	34,589 / 36,000	$4,165,354
9 August 2017	Philadelphia	United States	Wells Fargo Center	34,589 / 36,000	$4,165,354
11 August 2017	Philadelphia	United States	Wells Fargo Center	34,589 / 36,000	$4,165,354
13 August 2017	Nashville	United States	Bridgestone Arena	12,515 / 12,515	$1,393,041
7 September 2017	Newark	United States	Prudential Center	12,064 / 12,064	$1,810,911
9 September 2017	Buffalo	United States	KeyBank Center	10,634 / 13,183	$1,148,574
11 September 2017	Brooklyn	United States	Barclays Center	21,018 / 25,048	$2,779,735
12 September 2017	Brooklyn	United States	Barclays Center	21,018 / 25,048	$2,779,735
15 September 2017	Uniondale	United States	Nassau Veterans Memorial Coliseum	18,137 / 20,765	$2,280,573
16 September 2017	Uniondale	United States	Nassau Veterans Memorial Coliseum	18,137 / 20,765	$2,280,573
19 September 2017	Pittsburgh	United States	PPG Paints Arena	10,772 / 12,701	$1,208,751
21 September 2017	Cleveland	United States	Quicken Loans Arena	11,458 / 13,104	$1,275,858
23 September 2017	Albany	United States	Times Union Center	11,017 / 11,017	$1,217,536
24 September 2017	Hartford	United States	XL Center	7,783 / 10,014	$810,988
27 September 2017	Boston	United States	TD Garden	24,094 / 24,094	$3,331,153
28 September 2017	Boston	United States	TD Garden	24,094 / 24,094	$3,331,153
2 October 2017	Toronto	Canada	Air Canada Centre	40,061 / 40,061 (Note: The score data is combined from the shows held at the Air Canada Centre from 2, 3 & 13 October 2017 respectively.)	$4,640,310
3 October 2017	Toronto	Canada	Air Canada Centre	40,061 / 40,061	$4,640,310
6 October 2017	Quebec City	Canada	Videotron Centre	25,105 / 25,105	$2,966,180
7 October 2017	Quebec City	Canada	Videotron Centre	25,105 / 25,105	$2,966,180
10 October 2017	Ottawa	Canada	Canadian Tire Centre	11,365 / 12,478	$1,148,110
13 October 2017	Toronto	Canada	Air Canada Centre		
16 October 2017	Montreal	Canada	Bell Centre	34,983 / 38,143	$3,813,280
17 October 2017	Montreal	Canada	Bell Centre	34,983 / 38,143	$3,813,280
19 October 2017	Montreal	Canada	Bell Centre	34,983 / 38,143	$3,813,280
22 October 2017	Winnipeg	Canada	Bell MTS Place	11,152 / 12,682	$1,182,730
24 October 2017	Edmonton	Canada	Rogers Place	19,347 / 23,440	$1,973,130
25 October 2017	Edmonton	Canada	Rogers Place	19,347 / 23,440	$1,973,130
28 October 2017	Vancouver	Canada	Rogers Arena	25,520 / 27,312	$2,927,440
29 October 2017	Vancouver	Canada	Rogers Arena	25,520 / 27,312	$2,927,440
Oceania
24 January 2018	Auckland	New Zealand	Spark Arena	14,744 / 17,580	$1,605,066
26 January 2018	Auckland	New Zealand	Spark Arena	14,744 / 17,580	$1,605,066
30 January 2018	Dunedin	New Zealand	Forsyth Barr Stadium	12,790 / 14,836	$1,211,553
2 February 2018	Sydney	Australia	Qudos Bank Arena	16,608 / 16,716	$2,145,500
3 February 2018	Sydney	Australia	Qudos Bank Arena	16,608 / 16,716	$2,145,500
6 February 2018	Brisbane	Australia	Brisbane Entertainment Centre	12,927 / 16,444	$1,476,330
7 February 2018	Brisbane	Australia	Brisbane Entertainment Centre	12,927 / 16,444	$1,476,330
10 February 2018	Melbourne	Australia	Rod Laver Arena	25,824 / 29,727	$3,203,621
11 February 2018	Melbourne	Australia	Rod Laver Arena	25,824 / 29,727	$3,203,621
13 February 2018	Melbourne	Australia	Rod Laver Arena	25,824 / 29,727	$3,203,621
16 February 2018	Adelaide	Australia	Adelaide Entertainment Centre	7,202 / 7,765	$904,922
20 February 2018	Perth	Australia	Perth Arena	12,624 / 12,707	$1,546,760
Europe
13 April 2018	Barcelona	Spain	Palau Sant Jordi	26,070 / 30,258	$2,339,029
14 April 2018	Barcelona	Spain	Palau Sant Jordi	26,070 / 30,258	$2,339,029
17 April 2018	Milan	Italy	Mediolanum Forum	19,094 / 19,094	$2,124,221
18 April 2018	Milan	Italy	Mediolanum Forum	19,094 / 19,094	$2,124,221
21 April 2018	Bologna	Italy	Unipol Arena	48,400 / 64,844	$4,379,175
22 April 2018	Bologna	Italy	Unipol Arena	48,400 / 64,844	$4,379,175
24 April 2018	Bologna	Italy	Unipol Arena	48,400 / 64,844	$4,379,175
25 April 2018	Bologna	Italy	Unipol Arena	48,400 / 64,844	$4,379,175
27 April 2018	Prague	Czech Republic	O_{2} Arena	30,764 / 30,764	$2,770,112
28 April 2018	Prague	Czech Republic	O_{2} Arena	30,764 / 30,764	$2,770,112
2 May 2018	Budapest	Hungary	Budapest Sports Arena	13,332 / 13,380	$1,072,031
4 May 2018	Sofia	Bulgaria	Arena Armeec	13,564 / 14,750	$856,600
6 May 2018	Zagreb	Croatia	Arena Zagreb	14,471 / 15,705	$925,312
9 May 2018	Lyon	France	Halle Tony Garnier	13,788 / 13,788	$1,147,029
11 May 2018	Antwerp	Belgium	Sportpaleis	25,929 / 29,602	$2,694,928
12 May 2018	Antwerp	Belgium	Sportpaleis	25,929 / 29,602	$2,694,928
14 May 2018	Hamburg	Germany	Barclaycard Arena	10,652 / 11,696	$1,218,910
16 May 2018	Vienna	Austria	Wiener Stadthalle	9,758 / 9,852	$1,277,703
20 May 2018	Lisbon	Portugal	Altice Arena	32,068 / 32,068	$2,563,839
21 May 2018	Lisbon	Portugal	Altice Arena	32,068 / 32,068	$2,563,839
24 May 2018	Madrid	Spain	WiZink Center	28,402 / 32,722	$2,835,089
25 May 2018	Madrid	Spain	WiZink Center	28,402 / 32,722	$2,835,089
28 May 2018	Zürich	Switzerland	Hallenstadion	16,942 / 19,000	$2,806,270
29 May 2018	Zürich	Switzerland	Hallenstadion	16,942 / 19,000	$2,806,270
1 June 2018	Berlin	Germany	Mercedes-Benz Arena	23,059 / 23,059	$2,483,560
2 June 2018	Berlin	Germany	Mercedes-Benz Arena	23,059 / 23,059	$2,483,560
4 June 2018	Mannheim	Germany	SAP Arena	9,239 / 9,361	$1,084,250
8 June 2018	Nanterre	France	U Arena	45,639 / 56,540	$4,281,563
9 June 2018	Nanterre	France	U Arena	45,639 / 56,540	$4,281,563
11 June 2018	Cologne	Germany	Lanxess Arena	13,530 / 13,555	$1,508,170
13 June 2018	Munich	Germany	Olympiahalle	10,711 / 10,751	$1,284,431
16 June 2018	Lille	France	Stade Pierre-Mauroy	23,649 / 27,137	$1,903,451
18 June 2018 (Note: This show was filmed for the Roger Waters: Us + Them film.)	Amsterdam	Netherlands	Ziggo Dome	56,524 / 58,620	$5,146,945
19 June 2018	Amsterdam	Netherlands	Ziggo Dome	56,524 / 58,620	$5,146,945
22 June 2018	Amsterdam	Netherlands	Ziggo Dome	56,524 / 58,620	$5,146,945
23 June 2018	Amsterdam	Netherlands	Ziggo Dome	56,524 / 58,620	$5,146,945
26 June 2018	Dublin	Ireland	3Arena	15,226 / 16,506	$1,885,287
27 June 2018	Dublin	Ireland	3Arena	15,226 / 16,506	$1,885,287
29 June 2018	Glasgow	Scotland	SSE Hydro	19,678 / 20,042	$2,404,309
30 June 2018	Glasgow	Scotland	SSE Hydro	19,678 / 20,042	$2,404,309
2 July 2018	Liverpool	England	Echo Arena Liverpool	9,103 / 9,192	$1,097,010
3 July 2018	Manchester	England	Manchester Arena	11,478 / 13,697	$1,361,650
6 July 2018 (Note: The concert on 6 July 2018 at Hyde Park in London was part of the British Summer Time.)	London	England	Hyde Park	—	—
7 July 2018	Birmingham	England	Arena Birmingham	11,319 / 11,391	$1,358,340
11 July 2018	Lucca	Italy	Lucca City Walls	18,680 / 23,000	$2,111,898
14 July 2018	Rome	Italy	Circus Maximus	30,710 / 33,800	$3,003,301
3 August 2018	Kraków	Poland	Tauron Arena Kraków	16,937 / 17,054	$1,390,587
5 August 2018	Gdańsk	Poland	Ergo Arena	12,092 / 12,293	$1,009,888
7 August 2018	Herning	Denmark	Jyske Bank Boxen	10,040 / 10,444	$1,350,013
10 August 2018	Copenhagen	Denmark	Royal Arena	23,512 / 24,270	$3,217,551
11 August 2018	Copenhagen	Denmark	Royal Arena	23,512 / 24,270	$3,217,551
14 August 2018	Oslo	Norway	Telenor Arena	33,596 / 38,808	$3,712,435
15 August 2018	Oslo	Norway	Telenor Arena	33,596 / 38,808	$3,712,435
18 August 2018	Stockholm	Sweden	Friends Arena	19,043 / 19,238	$1,782,758
21 August 2018	Helsinki	Finland	Hartwall Arena	10,632 / 10,632	$1,094,232
24 August 2018	Riga	Latvia	Arēna Rīga	8,151 / 8,336	$1,082,662
26 August 2018	Kaunas	Lithuania	Žalgiris Arena	10,622 / 11,077	$931,553
29 August 2018	St. Petersburg	Russia	SKK Peterburgskiy	13,047 / 18,708	$1,061,555
31 August 2018	Moscow	Russia	SK Olimpiyskiy	23,045 / 25,027	$2,161,790
Latin America
9 October 2018	São Paulo	Brazil	Allianz Parque	81,545 / 86,860	$6,542,670
10 October 2018	São Paulo	Brazil	Allianz Parque	81,545 / 86,860	$6,542,670
13 October 2018	Brasília	Brazil	Estádio Mané Garrincha	50,478 / 55,342	$3,142,130
17 October 2018	Salvador	Brazil	Itaipava Arena Fonte Nova	28,477 / 54,493	$1,410,590
21 October 2018	Belo Horizonte	Brazil	Mineirão	49,709 / 50,987	$3,690,650
24 October 2018	Rio de Janeiro	Brazil	Maracanã Stadium	43,727 / 63,843	$2,412,970
27 October 2018	Curitiba	Brazil	Estádio Couto Pereira	41,833 / 42,325	$3,106,950
30 October 2018	Porto Alegre	Brazil	Estádio Beira-Rio	40,297 / 46,989	$3,814,250
3 November 2018	Montevideo	Uruguay	Estadio Centenario	40,103 / 47,500	$3,038,885
6 November 2018	La Plata	Argentina	Estadio Ciudad de La Plata	80,693 / 89,252	$5,318,280
10 November 2018	La Plata	Argentina	Estadio Ciudad de La Plata	80,693 / 89,252	$5,318,280
14 November 2018	Santiago	Chile	Estadio Nacional Julio Martínez Prádanos	52,624 / 52,624	$5,020,763
17 November 2018 (Note: The show on 17 November 2018 in Lima was originally scheduled in the National Stadium but it was moved to the Monumental Stadium for unknown reasons.)	Lima	Peru	Estadio Monumental "U"	21,830 / 28,000	$2,204,038
21 November 2018	Bogotá	Colombia	Estadio El Campín	29,682 / 32,789	$3,212,948
24 November 2018	San José	Costa Rica	Estadio Nacional de Costa Rica	46,111 / 47,101	$3,285,421
28 November 2018	Mexico City	Mexico	Estadio GNP Seguros	42,654 / 43,191	$4,264,174
29 November 2018	Mexico City	Mexico	Estadio GNP Seguros	42,654 / 43,191	$4,264,174
1 December 2018	Mexico City	Mexico	Estadio GNP Seguros	42,654 / 43,191	$4,264,174
4 December 2018	Guadalajara	Mexico	VFG Arena	25,123 / 26,062	$2,745,495
5 December 2018	Guadalajara	Mexico	VFG Arena	25,123 / 26,062	$2,745,495
8 December 2018	Monterrey	Mexico	Monterrey Arena	16,996 / 19,084	$1,618,985
9 December 2018	Monterrey	Mexico	Monterrey Arena	16,996 / 19,084	$1,618,985
Total				2,312,023 / 2,533,258 (91.2%)	$261,784,386
