= The Lockdown Sessions (Roger Waters album) =

2022 studio album by Roger Waters

Studio album by Roger Waters
- Released: 9 December 2022
- Recorded: 2020–2022
- Genre: Rock; progressive rock
- Length: 39:31
- Label: Legacy
- Producer: Roger Waters; Gus Seyffert

Roger Waters chronology
Roger Waters: Us + Them (2020)	The Lockdown Sessions (2022)	The Dark Side of the Moon Redux (2023)

Singles from The Lockdown Sessions
- 1. "Comfortably Numb 2022" Released: 18 November 2022

The Lockdown Sessions is the sixth studio album by the English singer-songwriter Roger Waters, released on 9 December 2022 by Legacy Recordings. It compiles home recordings he made during lockdown due to the COVID-19 pandemic, later remastered for this release.

== Overview ==
All of the songs are re-recordings of tracks from Waters' previous work with Pink Floyd (The Wall and The Final Cut) and solo (Amused to Death). Most of the songs were previously performed in these versions during the encore of his Us + Them Tour.

The reimagined "Comfortably Numb 2022" was introduced as the show opener for his This Is Not a Drill concerts; this rendition differs from the original version in its absence of guitar solos and being performed in a slower tempo, like a dirge.

== Track listing ==
All tracks are written by Roger Waters, except "Comfortably Numb 2022" written by David Gilmour and Roger Waters.

The Lockdown Sessions track listing
No.	Title	Length
1.	"Mother"	7:20
2.	"Two Suns in the Sunset"	6:01
3.	"Vera" (contains "Bring the Boys Back Home")	5:14
4.	"The Gunner's Dream"	5:32
5.	"The Bravery of Being Out of Range"	6:51
6.	"Comfortably Numb 2022"	8:30
Total length:		39:31

== Personnel ==
Personnel adapted from The Lockdown Sessions press release.

- Roger Waters – vocals, guitar, piano (all tracks)
- Dave Kilminster – guitar, rhythm guitar (all tracks)
- Jonathan Wilson – guitar, harmonium, synthesizer, backing vocals (all tracks)
- Gus Seyffert – bass, synthesizer, cello, backing vocals (all tracks)
- Bo Koster – Hammond organ (tracks 2–5)
- Robert Walter – organ, piano (track 6)
- Jon Carin – keyboards, synthesizer, backing vocals (all tracks)
- Joey Waronker – drums, percussion (all tracks)
- Lucius – backing vocals (all tracks)
- Amanda Belair – backing vocals (track 6)
- Shanay Johnson – vocals (track 6)
- Ian Ritchie – saxophone (track 2)
- Nigel Godrich – strings, backing vocals (track 6)

== Charts ==
Chart performance for The Lockdown Sessions
Chart (2023)	Peak position
Austrian Albums (Ö3 Austria)	18
Belgian Albums (Ultratop Flanders)	36
Belgian Albums (Ultratop Wallonia)	27
Dutch Albums (Album Top 100)	26
French Albums (SNEP)	100
German Albums (Offizielle Top 100)	14
Hungarian Albums (MAHASZ)	21
Italian Albums (FIMI)	24
New Zealand Albums (RMNZ)	33
Polish Albums (ZPAV)	29
Portuguese Albums (AFP)	4
Scottish Albums (OCC)	9
Spanish Albums (PROMUSICAE)	54
Swiss Albums (Schweizer Hitparade)	13
UK Albums (OCC)	56
