= Comfortably Numb =

1980 single by Pink Floyd

- Japanese single cover

Single by Pink Floyd

from the album The Wall
- B-side: "Hey You"
- Released: 23 June 1980
- Recorded: April–November 1979
- Genre: Progressive rock; art rock
- Length: 6:21 (album version); 3:59 (single edit); 6:53 (Echoes version)
- Label: Harvest (UK); Columbia (US)
- Songwriters: David Gilmour; Roger Waters
- Producers: Bob Ezrin; David Gilmour; James Guthrie; Roger Waters

Pink Floyd singles chronology
"Run Like Hell" (1980)	"Comfortably Numb" (1980)	"When the Tigers Broke Free" (1982)

Audio
- "Comfortably Numb" on YouTube

"Comfortably Numb" is a song by the English rock band Pink Floyd, released on their eleventh studio album, The Wall (1979). It was released as a single in 1980, with "Hey You" as the B-side.

The lyrics were written by the bassist, Roger Waters, who recalled his experience of being injected with tranquilisers before a performance in 1977. The music was composed by the guitarist, David Gilmour. Waters sang lead vocals on the verses, and Gilmour, the chorus. The two argued during the recording, with Waters seeking an orchestral arrangement and Gilmour preferring a more stripped-down arrangement. They compromised by combining both versions. Gilmour said "Comfortably Numb" was the last time he and Waters were able to work together constructively.

"Comfortably Numb" is one of Pink Floyd's most popular songs and is notable for its two guitar solos. In 2021, it was ranked number 179 on Rolling Stone's list of "the 500 Greatest Songs of All Time". A cover by Scissor Sisters in a radically different arrangement was a UK top ten hit in 2004. Gilmour contributed guitar to a cover by Body Count, released in 2024.

== Background and writing ==
The Wall is a concept album about an embittered and alienated rock star named Pink. In "Comfortably Numb", Pink is medicated by a doctor so he can perform for a show.

"Comfortably Numb" originated in a wordless demo recorded by the guitarist, David Gilmour, while he was working on his debut solo album in 1978. He did not use it for the album, and the demo was later picked up by Ezrin. The verses, which are also found in the wordless demo that Gilmour composed in 1978, were originally composed in the key of E minor, which Waters, later, asked to be changed to B minor. According to Gilmour, Waters also asked him to provide extra bars of music for the chorus, in order to add the line "I have become Comfortably Numb", which are the same chords found at the first bars of the chorus, but in a different order.

Waters' lyrics were inspired by his experience of being injected with tranquilizers for stomach cramps before a performance in 1977 at the Philadelphia Spectrum during Pink Floyd's In the Flesh Tour. He said, "That was the longest two hours of my life, trying to do a show when you can hardly lift your arm." The song's working title was "The Doctor". The producer, Bob Ezrin, looked at the completed lyrics and said they "just gave me goosebumps".

The verses are in B minor, while the chorus has been described as using a modal interchange of D major (B minor's relative major) and D Mixolydian.

== Recording ==
For the chorus, Gilmour and the session player Lee Ritenour used a pair of acoustic guitars strung in a similar manner to Nashville tuning, but with the low E string replaced with a high E string, two octaves higher than standard tuning. The same tuning was used for the arpeggios in another song from The Wall, "Hey You". To compose the two guitar solos, Gilmour recorded "five or six" solos, while Guthrie pieced together his preferred segments for the final take. He used a Big Muff distortion and delay effects on the solos.

The strings were recorded in New York by Ezrin and the American composer Michael Kamen. According to Waters, although he and Ezrin were satisfied with the recording, Gilmour found it "sloppy" and spent a week rerecording it. Waters described Gilmour's version as "just awful ... stilted and stiff, and it lost all the passion and life the original had". The disagreement became acrimonious.

Eventually, the group compromised by using the orchestral elements for the main portion and using Gilmour's stripped-down mix for the final guitar solo. Waters said: "That's all we could do without somebody 'winning' and somebody 'losing.' And of course, who lost, if you like, was the band, because it was clear at that point that we didn't [all] feel the same way about music." Ezrin later said he was happy with the final mix, as it provided a good contrast. Gilmour said "Comfortably Numb" represented "the last embers" of his ability to work collaboratively with Waters.

== Live performances ==
=== Pink Floyd ===
During the Wall Tour, where a giant wall was constructed across the stage during the performance, the song was performed with Waters dressed as a doctor at the bottom of the wall, and Gilmour singing and playing guitar from the top of the wall on a raised platform with spotlights shining from behind him. It was the first time the audience's attention was drawn to the top of the completed wall. According to Gilmour, the final solo was one of the few opportunities during those concerts in which he was free to improvise completely. Gilmour said:

It was a fantastic moment, I can tell [you], to be standing up on there, and Roger's just finished singing his thing, and I'm standing there, waiting. I'm in pitch darkness and no one knows I'm there yet. And Roger's down and he finishes his line, I start mine and the big back spots and everything go on and the audience, they're all looking straight ahead and down, and suddenly there's all this light up there and they all sort of—their heads all lift up and there's this thing up there and the sound's coming out and everything. Every night there's this sort of "[gasp!]" from about 15,000 people. And that's quite something, let me tell you.

After Waters left the band, Gilmour revised the verses to suit his preference for "grungier" live performances. Verse vocals were arranged for three-part harmony; these were sung by Richard Wright, Guy Pratt and Jon Carin. The ending guitar solo was also extended substantially, which resulted in performances often reaching 10 minutes or longer.

In December 1988, a video of the live performance from the A Momentary Lapse of Reason Tour, released on the live album Delicate Sound of Thunder, reached number 11 on MTV's Top 20 Video Countdown. The video was two minutes shorter than the album version and the video clip had different camera angles from the home video version.

Pink Floyd performed the song at Knebworth Park on 30 June 1990 and it was published on CD as Knebworth: The Album, and on video as Live At Knebworth 1990, along with "Run Like Hell". This version followed a similar arrangement to the A Momentary Lapse of Reason Tour version, however featured a slightly shorter ending solo, which was then cut down even further on the 2021 release Live at Knebworth 1990, which documented Pink Floyd's entire performance at the event.

Pink Floyd's performance on 20 October 1994 at Earls Court, London, as part of The Division Bell Tour, featured the full 10 minute performance of Comfortably Numb. The Pulse album and video releases edited out approximately 1:20 minutes of the ending solo, whereas the original pay-per-view video broadcast showed the unedited version.

Pink Floyd, complete with Waters, reunited briefly to perform at the Live 8 concert in Hyde Park, London on 2 July 2005. The set consisted of four songs, of which "Comfortably Numb" was the last. This version was arranged near-identically to the studio version.

=== Roger Waters ===
After leaving Pink Floyd, Waters first performed "Comfortably Numb" at the 1990 concert staging of The Wall – Live in Berlin on 21 July 1990. The event's purpose was to commemorate the fall of the Berlin Wall. Waters sang lead, Van Morrison sang Gilmour's vocal parts backed by Rick Danko and Levon Helm of The Band, with guitar solo by Rick Di Fonzo and Snowy White, and backup by the Rundfunk Orchestra & Choir. This version was used in the 2006 film The Departed, directed by Martin Scorsese. Van Morrison's 2007 compilation album Van Morrison at the Movies – Soundtrack Hits includes this version.

Waters subsequently performed the song at the Guitar Legends festival in Spain in 1991 with White on guitar solos, Waters playing acoustic guitar during the second solo, and guest vocals by Bruce Hornsby; and later at the Walden Woods benefit concert in Los Angeles in 1992 with guest vocals by Don Henley.

During Waters' In the Flesh concert tour, Doyle Bramhall II and Snowy White stood in for Gilmour's vocals and guitar solos; a role carried out by Chester Kamen and White in 2002. Waters played acoustic guitar in unison with Jon Carin, with Andy Fairweather Low on bass; his part was performed by Harry Waters in 2002. In his show The Dark Side of the Moon Live, Gilmour's vocals were performed by Jon Carin and Andy Fairweather Low, while both playing acoustic guitar and Waters playing bass, with Dave Kilminster and White performing the guitar solos.

During Waters' The Wall Live, Robbie Wyckoff sang Gilmour's vocals, and Dave Kilminster performed the guitar solos with G E Smith on bass. Both Wyckoff and Kilminster stood on top of the wall as Gilmour had done in the original tour. During the performance of 12 May 2011 at the London O2 Arena, David Gilmour appeared as a guest during this song, and both sang the choruses and played guitar from the top of the wall, echoing the original performances from The Wall Tour. The song contains one of the show's most memorable moments, when, at a specific point of the final guitar solo, Waters steps toward the wall and pounds it with his fists, triggering both an explosion of colours on the previously dark-grey screen projections and a collapsing wall.

Waters performed the song with Eddie Vedder singing Gilmour's vocals at 12-12-12: The Concert for Sandy Relief.

During Mexico City and Desert Trip shows, Waters performed with the same band setup as The Wall Live. During the Us + Them Tour, Gilmour's vocals were performed by Jonathan Wilson with guitar solos by Kilminster and bass by Gus Seyffert. On This Is Not a Drill, Waters performed a new "stripped down" version of the song as an introduction to the concerts.

=== David Gilmour ===
Gilmour has performed the song during each of his solo tours. In About Face, his 1984 tour to promote his album of the same title, the set list referred to the song as "Come on Big Bum". The vocals during the verses were performed by band members Gregg Dechert and Mickey Feat (in harmony). During a performance at the Hammersmith Odeon on April 30th 1984 Nick Mason was brought on stage as a guest and played drums on the song.

In 2001 and 2002, the verse vocals were performed on different dates by guest singers Robert Wyatt, Kate Bush, Durga McBroom, and Bob Geldof, who had played Pink in the film version of The Wall. Wyatt and Geldof, who had not memorised the verses, read the lyrics as they sang.

On 29 May 2006, at the Royal Albert Hall, David Bowie made a guest appearance and sang the verses, in what would be his final live performance in the United Kingdom. The next day, 30 May, Richard Wright sang the verses by himself (as on the rest of the tour) at the same venue. Both performances were included on Gilmour's Remember That Night concert video, compiled from all three of his shows there on 29, 30 and 31 May 2006, which were part of his On an Island concert series to promote his album of the same title. The show on the 31st featured Nick Mason on drums during the song

For the final show of the On an Island Tour, Gilmour performed the song at the Gdańsk Shipyard, Poland, with the Polish Baltic Philharmonic Orchestra providing the orchestral parts that had usually been created with backing tapes or multiple synthesizers. This version was released on Live in Gdańsk.

On the 2016 Rattle That Lock Tour, the verses were sung by Jon Carin (on legs 1–3), Chuck Leavell (on leg 4) (this version can be seen and heard on Live at Pompeii), and Bryan Chambers (leg 5). They were also performed by Benedict Cumberbatch on 28 September 2016 at the Royal Albert Hall.

During a performance at the Royal Albert Hall on 24 April 2016, Gilmour and his band incorporated the final refrain of the Prince song "Purple Rain" into the song as a tribute to Prince, who had died three days earlier.

On Gilmour's 2024 Luck and Strange Tour, the song's verses were sung by Guy Pratt (longtime touring bassist for Pink Floyd) and David Gilmour. Romany Gilmour, David Gilmour's youngest child, sang backing vocals for the chorus with her father.

== Reception ==
In both its original studio release and all subsequent live versions, "Comfortably Numb" has since received unanimous acclaim from music critics and many high-profile musicians following the release of its parent album, The Wall, at the end of November 1979, and has gone on to become recognized as one of Pink Floyd’s definitive works, as a band.

David Gilmour’s performance on the track has been consistently lauded as being the crowning achievement of his career as a guitarist. Cash Box said that "Gilmour's guitar cries out eloquently." Billboard said that "it displays the supergroup's lyrical strengths and passion for colorful, textured melody". Billboard critic David Farrell further said that it is a "miniature masterpiece in terms of arrangement, production and performance". Record World said that "dreamy vocals float over a sea of thick synthesizer textures and solo guitar waves". Author Mike Cormack wrote that the song "is perhaps the apex of rock music as an artform. No other song cuts deeper, says so much about the human condition, or hits such moments of beauty and horror" and that Gilmour's second guitar solo "is an utter master at work, leaving space, repeating and building on licks to give a sense of structure, not overplaying, building to a shrieking climax, and then fading out while leaving the listener wanting more".

In 2011, the song was ranked fifth in the BBC Radio 4's listeners' Desert Island Discs choices. In a poll of readers of Guitar World, Gilmour's solo was rated the fourth-best guitar solo of all time. In August 2006, it was voted the greatest guitar solo of all time in a poll by listeners of the radio station Planet Rock. Gilmour's guitar tone in the song was named best guitar sound by Guitarist in November 2010. The two guitar solos were ranked as the greatest guitar solos of all time by Planet Rock listeners. In 2017, Billboard and Paste both ranked the song number four on their lists of the greatest Pink Floyd songs.

== Personnel ==
Pink Floyd

- Roger Waters – lead vocals (verses), bass guitar (verses)
- David Gilmour – lead and harmony vocals (chorus), acoustic guitar (verses), electric guitar, bass guitar (chorus), pedal steel guitar, Prophet-5 synthesiser
- Nick Mason – drums
- Richard Wright – Hammond organ

Additional personnel

- Michael Kamen – orchestral arrangements
- Lee Ritenour – acoustic guitar (chorus)

== Certifications ==
Certifications for "Comfortably Numb" by Pink Floyd
Region	Certification	Certified units/sales
Denmark (IFPI Danmark)	Gold	45,000^{‡}
Italy (FIMI) sales since 2009	Platinum	50,000^{‡}
New Zealand (RMNZ)	4× Platinum	120,000^{‡}
Spain (Promusicae)	Gold	30,000^{‡}
United Kingdom (BPI) sales since 2004	Platinum	600,000^{‡}
^{‡} Sales+streaming figures based on certification alone.

== Other versions ==
=== Scissor Sisters version ===
"Comfortably Numb"

Single by Scissor Sisters

from the album Scissor Sisters
- B-side: "Rock My Spot (Crevice Canyon)"
- Released: 19 January 2004
- Genre: Post-disco; art rock
- Length: 4:25
- Label: Polydor
- Songwriters: David Gilmour; Roger Waters
- Producer: Scissor Sisters

Scissor Sisters singles chronology
"Laura" (2003)	"Comfortably Numb" (2004)	"Take Your Mama" (2004)

American pop rock band Scissor Sisters recorded a radically re-arranged disco-oriented cover that Polydor Records released as a single in January 2004. Backed with the B-side "Rock My Spot (Crevice Canyon)", this version reached number 10 on the UK Singles Chart. David Gilmour and Nick Mason expressed a liking for the group's version, and Roger Waters is said to have congratulated the Scissor Sisters on the version. Jake Shears, the band's lead singer, was invited by Gilmour to sing "Comfortably Numb" with him in some 2006 shows, but the idea was dropped at the last moment to Shears' public disappointment. This cover received a Grammy nomination for Best Dance Recording but lost to "Toxic" by Britney Spears.

==== Charts ====
===== Weekly charts =====
Weekly chart performance for "Comfortably Numb" by Scissor Sisters
Chart (2004)	Peak position
Australia (ARIA)	73
Australian Club Chart (ARIA)	4
Australian Dance (ARIA)	9
Belgium (Ultratop 50 Flanders)	39
Belgium (Ultratip Bubbling Under Wallonia)	10
CIS Airplay (TopHit)	164
Croatia (HRT)	8
Germany (GfK)	97
Ireland (IRMA)	30
Ireland Dance (IRMA)	2
Netherlands (Dutch Top 40 Tipparade)	2
Netherlands (Single Top 100)	84
Russia Airplay (TopHit)	167
Scottish Singles Sales (Official Charts)	9
Sweden (Sverigetopplistan)	27
UK Singles (Official Charts)	10
UK Dance (Official Charts)	1

===== Year-end charts =====
Year-end chart performance for "Comfortably Numb" by Scissor Sisters
Chart (2004)	Position
Australian Club Chart (ARIA)	17
UK Singles (OCC)	175

==== Release history ====
Release history and formats for "Comfortably Numb" by Scissor Sisters
Region	Date	Format(s)	Label(s)	Ref.
United Kingdom	19 January 2004	12-inch vinyl; CD	Polydor	
Australia	15 March 2004	CD	Polydor	

=== "Comfortably Numb 2022" ===
"Comfortably Numb 2022"

Single by Roger Waters

from the album The Lockdown Sessions
- Released: 17 November 2022
- Recorded: 2022
- Length: 8:30
- Label: Legacy
- Songwriters: David Gilmour; Roger Waters
- Producers: Waters; Gus Seyffert

Roger Waters singles chronology
"The Last Refugee" (2017)	"Comfortably Numb 2022" (2022)	"Money" (2023)

In November 2022, Waters released a new version, "Comfortably Numb 2022", recorded during the COVID-19 lockdowns to use as an opener for his This Is Not a Drill concerts. The song was later included on his album The Lockdown Sessions. A music video was produced and directed by Sean Evans.

The new version was recorded at various studios during the tour's North American leg, including Bias Studios outside of Washington D.C., Electric Lady Studios in New York City, Armoury Studios in Vancouver, and Tree Sound Studios in Atlanta. It was produced by Waters and Gus Seyffert.

Waters lowered the key to A minor "to make it darker", and removed the solos but for a vocal solo from Shanay Johnson. He said he intended it as "a wakeup call, and a bridge towards a kinder future with more talking to strangers". A live rendition was released on the live album and film Roger Waters: This Is Not a Drill – Live from Prague in August 2025.

=== Body Count version ===
The American metal band Body Count released a cover of "Comfortably Numb" in September 2024. It features Gilmour on guitar and additional lyrics by the rapper Ice-T. Gilmour offered to record guitar after Ice-T contacted him to request permission to cover the song. Ice-T said it was an "introspective song" that acknowledged his advancing age: "I'm telling the younger generation, you've got two choices: you can keep the fire burning or you can give up." Gilmour said he liked the additional lyrics, and that "It astonishes me that a tune I wrote almost 50 years ago is back with this great new approach. They've made it relevant again."

=== "Comfortably Numb Re-Imagined" ===
Roger Waters and Mona Miari released a new version of the song "as a tribute to Gaza’s citizens" in June 2026.

== Bibliography ==
- Blake, Mark (2008), Comfortably Numb – The Inside Story of Pink Floyd (1st US paperback ed.), Cambridge, Massachusetts: Da Capo Press, ISBN 978-0-306-81752-6
- Blake, Mark (2011) [2007]. Pigs Might Fly : The Inside Story of Pink Floyd. Arum Press. ISBN 978-1-781-31519-4. Archived from the original on 21 May 2021.
- Cormack, Mike (2024). Everything Under The Sun: The Complete Guide To Pink Floyd. The History Press. ISBN 978-1803995359.
- Fitch, Vernon. The Pink Floyd Encyclopedia (3rd edition), 2005. ISBN 1-894959-24-8
- Mabbett, Andy (1995). The Complete Guide to the music of Pink Floyd. Omnibus Press. ISBN 0-7119-4301-X.
