= Igor Stravinsky's The Soldier's Tale =

Studio album by Roger Waters
- Released: 26 October 2018
- Recorded: 11 – 12 December 2014
- Venue: Bridgehampton Presbyterian Church
- Genre: Classical
- Length: 79:02
- Label: Sony Classical Masterworks

Roger Waters chronology
Is This the Life We Really Want? (2017)	Igor Stravinsky's The Soldier's Tale (2018)	Roger Waters: Us + Them (2020)

Professional ratings
Review scores
Source	Rating
AllMusic	3.5/5 stars

Igor Stravinsky's The Soldier's Tale is the fifth studio album by English rock musician Roger Waters, released on 26 October 2018 by Sony Classical Masterworks. It was recorded on 11 to 12 December in 2014 at Bridgehampton Presbyterian Church. It is an adaptation of the narration for Igor Stravinsky’s 1918 theatrical work. In 2018, Waters recorded this version with members of the Bridgehampton Chamber Music Festival, in which he narrates his adaptation of the story and portrays all characters.

== Track listing ==
=== Part I ===
All music is composed by Igor Stravinsky.

No.	Title	Length
1.	"The Soldier's March"	1:47
2.	"Slogging Homeword..."	2:20
3.	"Airs by a Stream"	2:35
4.	"As You Can Hear..."	7:41
5.	"The Soldier's March (Reprise)"	1:48
6.	"Eventually, Joseph Reaches His Home Village..."	2:55
7.	"Pastorale"	2:35
8.	"The Soldier, Disconsolate..."	4:14
9.	"Pastorale (Reprise)"	0:37
10.	"The Soldier, Slowly Coming Back to Himself..."	2:48
11.	"Airs by a Stream (Reprise): To Stretch Out on the Grass..."	0:47
12.	"Hey Satan, You Bastard..."	5:33
13.	"Airs by a Stream (2nd Reprise)"	0:46
14.	"Naught to Be Gained Here..."	0:05
Total length:		36:30

=== Part II ===
All music is composed by Igor Stravinsky.

No.	Title	Length
1.	"The Soldier’s March (2nd Reprise): Down a Hot and Dusty Track..."	0:50
2.	"He Doesn't Even Know Himself..."	0:52
3.	"The Soldier’s March (3rd Reprise): Will He Take the Road to Home..."	0:28
4.	"He Doesn't Have a Home Anymore..."	3:56
5.	"The Royal March"	2:38
6.	"So, All Was Arranged..."	0:58
7.	"Later That Night..."	8:39
8.	"The Little Concert: Light Floods the Eastern Sky..."	2:59
9.	"The Soldier, with a Confident Air..."	0:46
10.	"Three Dances: Tango (Part 1)"	1:18
11.	"Three Dances: Tango (Part 2)"	1:01
12.	"Three Dances: Waltz & Ragtime"	4:02
13.	"So, First a Tango..."	0:40
14.	"The Devil's Dance"	1:20
15.	"The Devil, Confused..."	0:27
16.	"The Little Chorale"	0:42
17.	"The Devil Recovers Some of His Wits..."	0:14
18.	"The Devil's Song: Alright! You’ll Be Safe at Home..."	0:39
19.	"Hm, a Fair Warning..."	0:14
20.	"Grand Chorale (Part 1)"	0:29
21.	"Spring, Summer, Autumn..."	0:16
22.	"Grand Chorale (Part 2)"	0:30
23.	"Steady Now..."	0:11
24.	"Grand Chorale (Part 3)"	0:27
25.	"Steady, Just Smell the Flowers..."	0:14
26.	"Grand Chorale (Part 4)"	0:52
27.	"Now I Have Everything..."	0:34
28.	"Grand Chorale (Part 5)"	0:55
29.	"The Princess, All Excited..."	1:21
30.	"Grand Chorale (Part 6)"	0:26
31.	"And So, Off They Go..."	1:14
32.	"Triumphal March of the Devil"	2:24
Total length:		42:32

== See also ==
- L'Histoire du soldat
