= Joey Waronker =

American drummer

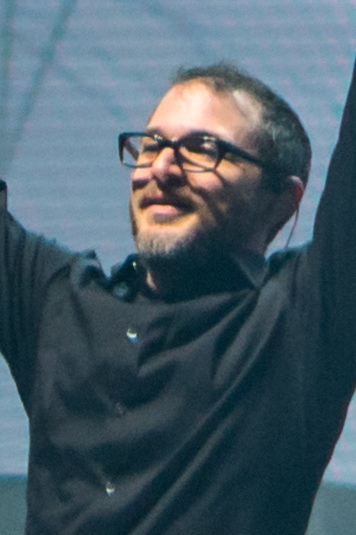
- Waronker in 2018
- Born: Jon Joseph Waronker; 1968 or 1969 (age 57–58); Los Angeles, California, U.S.
- Occupations: Musician; songwriter
- Parents: Lenny Waronker (father); Donna Loren (mother)
- Relatives: Anna Waronker (sister); Si Waronker (grandfather)
- Musical career
- Genres: Alternative rock; pop; experimental rock
- Instrument: Drums
- Years active: 1989–present
- Member of: Ultraísta
- Formerly of: Walt Mink; Ima Robot; Atoms for Peace

Jon Joseph Waronker (born 1968 or 1969) is an American drummer who has performed with artists including Beck, Oasis, and R.E.M. He is a member of Ultraísta and a former member of Walt Mink, Ima Robot and Atoms for Peace.

== Early life ==
Waronker was born in Los Angeles, California. His father Lenny is the former head of Warner Bros. Records and DreamWorks Records. His mother is actress and singer Donna Loren. His parents are Jewish. His sister Anna is a singer-songwriter, and his grandfather was classical violinist Simon Waronker.

== Career ==
Waronker began his career drumming for the alternative rock band Walt Mink, whom he joined in college. Starting in the 1990s, Waronker worked with Beck, R.E.M., the Smashing Pumpkins, and Richard Thompson.

In 2009, Waronker joined Thom Yorke, Nigel Godrich, Mauro Refosco and Flea to play material from Yorke's album The Eraser, as well as other original pieces, for three dates in Los Angeles in October 2009. The band, now named Atoms for Peace, then played a brief tour of America in April 2010. Their full-length album Amok was released February 25, 2013, on XL Records. Waronker later contributed drums to the song "The Axe" from Yorke's third studio album, Anima.

Waronker formed Ultraísta with Nigel Godrich and Laura Bettison, releasing their debut album in 2012. The same year, he appeared on Irish folk musician Malojian's 2017 album, Let Your Weirdness Carry You Home.

Waronker played on Roger Waters' album Is This the Life We Really Want? (2017) and joined Waters' band during the Us + Them Tour. He contributed to Waters' Lockdown Session, The Dark Side of the Moon Redux album and performed on Waters' This Is Not a Drill tour (2022–2023).

In 2023, producer Greg Kurstin enlisted Waronker to play drums on Liam Gallagher and John Squire's self-titled collaboration album, and Waronker also joined its subsequent tour. In July 2025, Waronker became a touring member of Oasis on their 2025 tour, with Liam Gallagher saying of Waronker: "He's the best and we're lucky to have him. I've enjoyed all our drummers but this guy is special."

== Album credits ==
- Mellow Gold – Beck (1994)
- Odelay – Beck (1996)
- Mutations – Beck (1998)
- Let It Rain – Tracy Chapman (2002)
- Folklore – Nelly Furtado (2003)
- Chariot – Gavin DeGraw (2003)
- Melancolista – Adam Cohen (2004)
- Chaos and Creation in the Backyard – Paul McCartney (2005)
- Fires – Nerina Pallot (2005)
- How the Mighty Fall – Mark Owen (2005)
- Wreck of the Day – Anna Nalick (2005)
- What's Left of Me – Nick Lachey (2006)
- Loose – Nelly Furtado (2006)
- Two Lights (album) – Five for Fighting (2006)
- The Sermon on Exposition Boulevard – Rickie Lee Jones (2007)
- Our Bright Future – Tracy Chapman (2008)
- The Fall – Norah Jones (2009)
- IRM – Charlotte Gainsbourg (2009)
- ...Little Broken Hearts – Norah Jones (2012)
- AMOK – Atoms for Peace (2013)
- Melody Road – Neil Diamond (2014)
- The Desired Effect – Brandon Flowers (2015)
- Victorious – Wolfmother (2016)
- Bleeding Heart – Regina Spektor (2016)
- Is This the Life We Really Want? – Roger Waters (2017)
- Tasmania – Pond (2019)
- Anima – Thom Yorke (2019)
- Rare Birds – Jonathan Wilson (2018)
- American Utopia – David Byrne (2018)
- Home, Before and After – Regina Spektor (2022)
- Us + Them – Roger Waters (2022)
- Cry Baby – Tegan and Sara (2022)
- Radio Daze + Glamping – Roger Manning (2023)
- The Lockdown Sessions – Roger Waters (2023)
- The Dark Side of the Moon Redux – Roger Waters (2023)
- Autumn Jones – Norah Jones (2024)
- Liam Gallagher John Squire – Liam Gallagher and John Squire (2024)
- This Is Not a Drill: Live from Prague – Roger Waters (2025)
- I Used to Go to This Bar – Joyce Manor (2026)
