= The Last Refugee =

Single by Roger Waters

from the album Is This the Life We Really Want?
- Released: May 19, 2017
- Genre: Alternative rock, indie rock
- Length: 4:12
- Label: Columbia
- Songwriter: Roger Waters
- Producer: Nigel Godrich

Roger Waters singles chronology
| "Déjà Vu" (2017) | "The Last Refugee" (2017) |

Music video
- "The Last Refugee" on YouTube

"The Last Refugee" is a song by English rock musician and former Pink Floyd member, Roger Waters. It is the third single and track on his fourth studio album, Is This the Life We Really Want? It was released as a single on 19 May 2017 and the album was released on 2 June 2017, by Columbia Records.

The song was performed at every show of Waters' Us + Them Tour from 2017-2018.

== Track listing ==
UK promotional single
| No. | Title | Writer(s) | Length |
|---|---|---|---|
| 1. | "The Last Refugee" | Roger Waters | 4:12 |

== Music video ==
The music video, co-directed by Sean Evans and Roger Waters, features a Syrian refugee woman.

== Personnel ==
- Roger Waters – vocals, piano
- Gus Seyffert – bass
- Nigel Godrich – keyboards, sound collages, arrangements
- Joey Waronker – drums
- Jessica Wolfe – vocals
- Holly Laessig – vocals
- David Campbell – string arrangements
