= Smell the Roses =

Single by Roger Waters

from the album Is This the Life We Really Want?
- Released: 20 April 2017
- Genre: Progressive rock
- Length: 5:15
- Label: Columbia
- Songwriter: Roger Waters
- Producer: Nigel Godrich

Roger Waters singles chronology
"We Shall Overcome" (2010)	"Smell the Roses" (2017)	"Déjà Vu" (2017)

"Smell the Roses" is a song by English rock musician and former Pink Floyd member Roger Waters, and the ninth track on his fifth studio album, Is This the Life We Really Want? It was released as a single on 20 April 2017, and the album was released on 2 June 2017, by Columbia Records.

In an interview, Waters said of the song: "“Smell the Roses” is almost an afterthought. It’s Nigel going, “Oh fuck, you’ve written all these ballads, thank God we’ve done some jams. Could you please write some words to this thing?” “What thing?” “Oh, that thing in E.” “Do I have to?” “Yeah.” So I wrote that song four or five times and then eventually I said, “I’ve had this idea, which I think might work. What if Battersea Power Station is a munitions factory? And also it’s where we torture people? And it’s also this, and that, and the other, and we wrap everything up?” “Whatever, just write it!” So that’s it. It’s the image of this malevolent presence."

The track marks the first music from Waters' first album in 25 years and his first record of new studio material since 1992's Amused to Death. The track later appeared on his next LP, which Waters said would provide listeners with "unflinching commentary on the modern world and uncertain times."

== Track listing ==
UK promotional single
No.	Title	Writer(s)	Length
1.	"Smell the Roses"	Roger Waters	5:15
