= Déjà Vu (Roger Waters song) =

Single by Roger Waters

from the album Is This the Life We Really Want?
- Released: 8 May 2017
- Genre: Art rock
- Length: 4:27
- Label: Columbia
- Songwriter: Roger Waters
- Producer: Nigel Godrich

Roger Waters singles chronology
| "Smell the Roses" (2017) | "Déjà Vu" (2017) | "The Last Refugee" (2017) |

"Déjà Vu" is a song by English rock musician and former Pink Floyd member Roger Waters, and the second track on his fourth solo studio album, Is This the Life We Really Want? It was released as a single on 8 May 2017, with the album being released on 2 June 2017, by Columbia Records. It was previously known as "Lay Down Jerusalem (If I Had Been God)" when played live before the single's official release. Waters reintroduced the 'Lay Down Jerusalem' refrain in live performances dating from the 2018 Oceania leg of his Us + Them Tour.

== Track listing ==
UK promotional single
| No. | Title | Writer(s) | Length |
|---|---|---|---|
| 1. | "Déjà Vu" | Roger Waters | 4:27 |

== Personnel ==
- Roger Waters – vocals, acoustic guitar, bass guitar
