= Dave Kilminster =

British musician

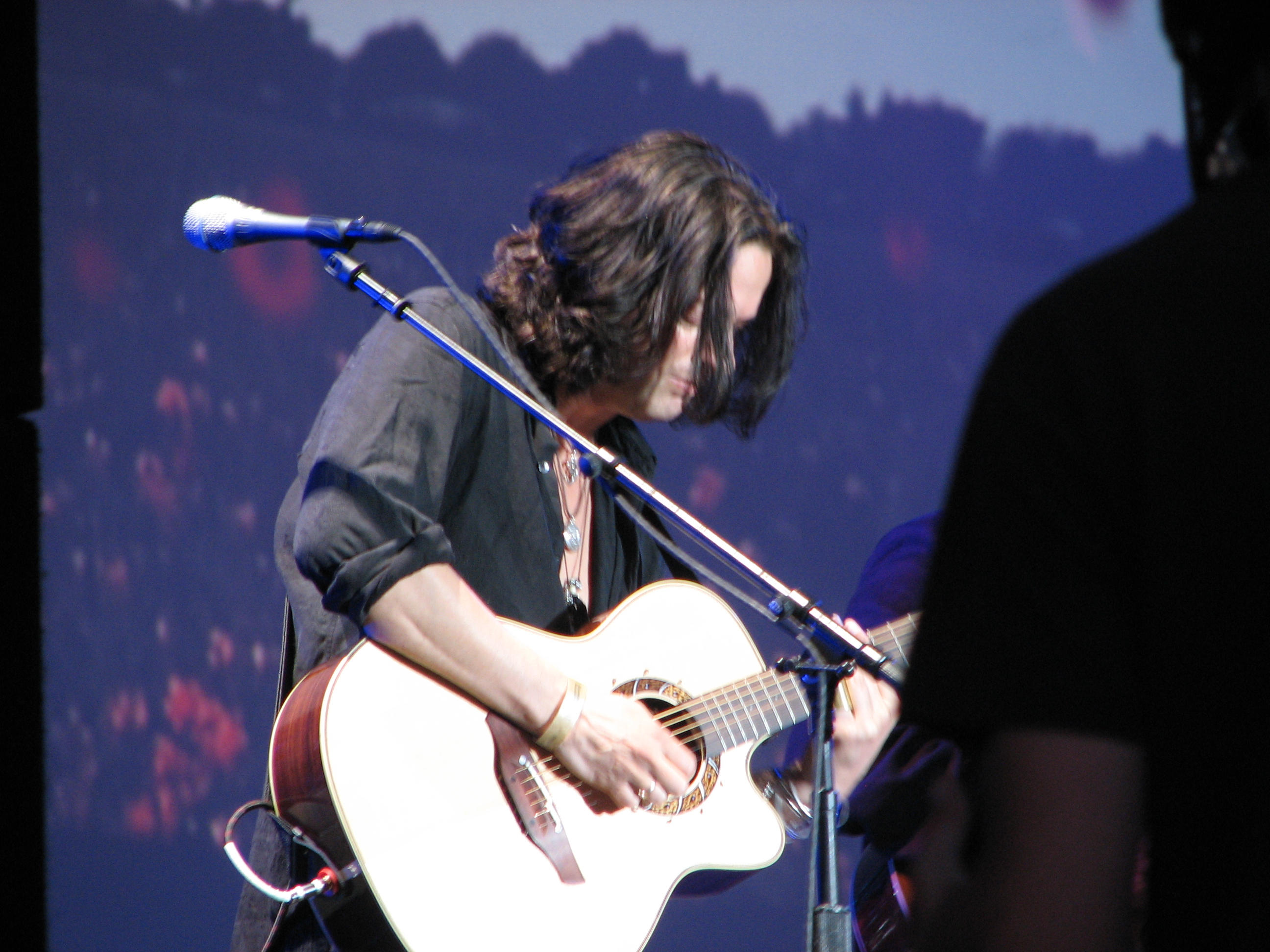
- Kilminster performing with Roger Waters' band at Arrow Rock Festival, 2006

Background information
- Born: David Kilminster; 25 January 1962 (age 63); England
- Genres: Progressive rock
- Occupations: Musician; producer; music teacher
- Instruments: Vocals; guitar
- Years active: 1991–present
- Member of: Roger Waters Band; Steven Wilson Band
- Formerly of: John Wetton Band; Qango; Keith Emerson
- Website: davekilminster.com

David Kilminster (born 25 January 1962) is a British guitarist, vocalist, songwriter, producer and music teacher. He has toured as a sideman with Steven Wilson and Roger Waters.

== Biography ==
Kilminster began playing piano in childhood, and later took up the guitar. During his youth he also sang in a barbershop quartet. He had a temporary job working on computers for IBM. He was asked to teach at the Guitar Institute in Acton, where his job also involved writing exam material and courses for Trinity College and Thames Valley University.

Kilminster has taught at the Academy of Contemporary Music in Guildford and written for Guitar Techniques magazine. He has launched a series of instructional DVDs for Roadrock's Lick Library after the success of his global satellite series, Killer Guitar.

In 2002, Kilminster toured with Keith Emerson and Emerson's group the Nice, emulating the guitar work of David O'List. An album was released called Vivacitas Live at Glasgow 2002, featuring Keith Emerson, Lee Jackson and Brian Davison of the Nice, with Kilminster, Phil Williams and Pete Riley on the recording also. From 2006 to 2008, he toured with Roger Waters on his The Dark Side of the Moon Live tour, and from 2010 to 2013 performed as lead guitarist on Waters' The Wall Live 2010–2013 tour. On both tours, he performed similar parts to David Gilmour on the original studio albums. He has also played alongside John Wetton (ex King Crimson), Ken Hensley (ex Uriah Heep), Qango (an Asia spin-off), the Nice, and Carl Palmer. In May 2015, Kilminster replaced Guthrie Govan in Steven Wilson's band for its 2015 North American tour. From 2017 to 2018 he joined Roger Waters on his global "Us + Them" tour alongside guitarist Jonathan Wilson. He subsequently also played guitar on Roger Waters’ 2022 / 2023 This Is Not a Drill world tour.

Kilminster rereleased his acoustic guitar album 'Playing with Fire' in 2004. In 2007, he launched the rock album Scarlet, which featured Emerson bandmates, drummer Pete Riley and bassist Phil Williams. It was rereleased as 'Scarlet – The Director's Cut' in 2012. This was followed up by a new album of original material, and ... The Truth will set you free in 2014. Kilminster co-produced Anne-Marie Helder's first solo album, The Contact (2004). She sings backing vocals on Scarlet.

== Style and equipment ==
Kilminster is left-handed, but after damaging his right wrist in a go-kart accident, he started playing guitar right-handed. He has since said he is ambidextrous He has used many different playing techniques such as tapping and sweep picking, but considers them to be "just tools really" and not an important part of his playing style.

Kilminster has used Fender Telecasters and Takamine acoustic guitars. For the Dark Side of the Moon tour, he used a Richie Kotzen signature telecaster with custom DiMarzio pickups. He has used Cornford guitar amplifiers. As of May 2015, he uses Suhr custom-made guitars and Brunetti amplifiers. On last tour with Roger Waters he used Paoletti custom guitars
