= Is This the Life We Really Want? =

2017 studio album by Roger Waters

Studio album by Roger Waters
- Released: 2 June 2017
- Recorded: 2010–2017
- Studios: Electric Lady Studios (New York City, NY); Fivestar Studio (Los Angeles, California), United Recording Studios, Wack Formula Studio
- Genres: Rock; progressive rock
- Length: 54:06
- Label: Columbia
- Producer: Nigel Godrich

Roger Waters chronology
Roger Waters: The Wall (2015)	Is This the Life We Really Want? (2017)	Igor Stravinsky's The Soldier's Tale (2018)

Roger Waters studio chronology
Ça Ira (2005)	Is This the Life We Really Want? (2017)	Igor Stravinsky's The Soldier's Tale (2018)

Singles from Is This the Life We Really Want?
- 1. "Smell the Roses" Released: 20 April 2017; 2. "Déjà Vu" Released: 8 May 2017; 3. "The Last Refugee" Released: 19 May 2017

Is This the Life We Really Want? is the fourth solo album by the English rock musician Roger Waters, released on 2 June 2017 by Columbia Records. It was produced by Nigel Godrich, who urged Waters to make a more concise, less theatrical album. It was Waters' first solo album since Amused to Death (1992), and his first studio work since the opera Ça Ira (2005).

The album reached number three in the UK and number 11 in the US. "Smell the Roses", "Déjà Vu", "The Last Refugee" and "Wait for Her" were released as singles. It was nominated for the 2018 Grammy Award for Best Engineered Album, Non-Classical.

== Recording ==
Is This the Life We Really Want? was recorded in Los Angeles and London. It was produced by Nigel Godrich, who met Waters when he produced the 2015 live album Roger Waters: The Wall. Though Waters had not heard Godrich's work with Radiohead, they got on well and discussed working together. Godrich, a fan of Waters' work with Pink Floyd, was frank with Waters, telling him he found some of his solo work "unlistenable". However, he was reassured that Waters "really still had it" after hearing his demo of "Déjà Vu".

Godrich wanted to create a pared-back album to showcase Waters "the poet". He felt Waters' creativity had been invigorated by his recent Wall Live tour, and that his role as producer was "to push him a little bit". He encouraged Waters to make a concise record, reminding him that Pink Floyd's 1973 album The Dark Side of the Moon is only 43 minutes long. Unlike most of his work, Waters did not co-produce the record, saying in an interview: "[Godrich] did a brilliant job ... I sat on my hands with lips zipped. You've rented this dog, let it work." Godrich used tape loops and found sounds extensively to create segues between tracks. He is also credited for arrangement, sound collages, keyboards, guitar and mixing.

== Themes ==
Waters initially planned to record a concept album. He conceived a radio play about a man and his granddaughter investigating why children are being killed in other parts of the world. He described the play as "part magic carpet ride, part political rant, part anguish", and said it featured about a dozen songs. Godrich persuaded Waters to abandon the theatrical elements and create a "less linear" work. Waters said he planned to produce the original idea in the future.

Waters said of the themes:

The concerns I have with that central question – "Why are we killing the children?" – are still there. I'm still deeply concerned that we're killing children all over the world with hardly a second thought because we've become so insensitive to the idea of every time the curtain falls on some forgotten life, it is because we stood by silent and indifferent – it's normal. I'm quoting from the record now. And unfortunately, it has become normal; we have normalized the death of the innocent.

Waters also said the album was influenced by having fallen in love:

The record is really about love – which is what all of my records have been about, in fact ... It's also the question of how do we take these moments of love – if we are granted any in our lives – and allow that love to shine on the rest of existence, on others.

The lyrics criticise the President Donald Trump and his administration, as well as samples of Trump speaking. Matilda Berke of Atwood Magazine wrote: "Upon closer inspection, however, it becomes clear that Waters has larger targets than a single orange-haired demagogue. [...] Apathy, it seems, is Roger Waters' primary foe."

== Release ==
Is This the Life We Really Want? was released on 2 June 2017 by Columbia Records. It was Waters' first solo album since Amused to Death (1992). It reached number 3 in the UK and number 11 in the US before falling off the US charts in four weeks. "Smell the Roses" was released as a single on 20 April, followed by "Déjà Vu" on 8 May, "The Last Refugee" on 19 May and "Wait for Her" on 19 July. The album was blocked from release in Italy after the artist Emilio Isgrò alleged that the cover art plagiarised his work.

== Critical reception ==
Professional ratings
Aggregate scores
Source	Rating
Metacritic	72/100
Review scores
Source	Rating
AllMusic	4/5 stars
Consequence of Sound	B
Drowned in Sound	8/10
Exclaim!	7/10
The Independent	2/5 stars
The Observer	3/5 stars
Pitchfork	6.9/10
Record Collector	5/5 stars
Rolling Stone	4/5 stars
Sputnikmusic	4.1/5

At Metacritic, which assigns a normalized rating out of 100 to reviews from critics, the album received an average score of 72, based on 16 reviews, indicating "generally favorable reviews". Rolling Stone said: "The music is quintessential post-Dark Side Of The Moon Floyd, but channeled by offspring ... Godrich brings prog-rock grandeur, multi-instrumentalist Jonathan Wilson microdose psychedelia, Lucius alt-R&B backing vocals." Drowned in Sound said the album is "a long, sprawling epic that stretches out for its slightly-padded running time, but one so full of ideas and intricacies that it's an easy album to get sucked into".

Consequence of Sound said the album was "easily the most accessible of Waters' solo work—a distillation in many regards of the anti-fascist, anti-imperialist, anti-greed messages he's been broadcasting since Pink Floyd". Pitchfork said the "myriad sonic references to his work with Pink Floyd suggest that Waters is comfortable with his past. The more you accept how much his past reflects in his present, the more receptive you'll be to this album's charms." Is This the Life We Really Want? was nominated for the 2018 Grammy Award for Best Engineered Album, Non-Classical.

== Track listing ==
All tracks are written by Roger Waters, except "Wait for Her", written by Waters & Mahmoud Darwish.

No.	Title	Length
1.	"When We Were Young"	1:39
2.	"Déjà Vu"	4:27
3.	"The Last Refugee"	4:12
4.	"Picture That"	6:47
5.	"Broken Bones"	4:57
6.	"Is This the Life We Really Want?"	5:55
7.	"Bird in a Gale"	5:31
8.	"The Most Beautiful Girl"	6:09
9.	"Smell the Roses"	5:15
10.	"Wait for Her"	4:56
11.	"Oceans Apart"	1:07
12.	"Part of Me Died"	3:14
Total length:		54:06

== Personnel ==
- Roger Waters – vocals, acoustic guitar, bass
- Gus Seyffert – guitar, keyboards, bass
- Nigel Godrich – guitar, keyboards, sound collages, arrangements
- Jonathan Wilson – guitar, keyboards
- Roger Joseph Manning Jr. – keyboards
- Lee Pardini – keyboards
- Joey Waronker – drums
- Jessica Wolfe – vocals
- Holly Laessig – vocals
- David Campbell – string arrangements

== Charts ==
=== Weekly charts ===
Chart (2017)	Peak position
Australian Albums (ARIA)	7
Austrian Albums (Ö3 Austria)	3
Belgian Albums (Ultratop Flanders)	2
Belgian Albums (Ultratop Wallonia)	1
Canadian Albums (Billboard)	4
Czech Albums (ČNS IFPI)	1
Danish Albums (Hitlisten)	2
Dutch Albums (Album Top 100)	2
Finnish Albums (Suomen virallinen lista)	9
French Albums (SNEP)	3
German Albums (Offizielle Top 100)	3
Hungarian Albums (MAHASZ)	8
Irish Albums (IRMA)	8
Italian Albums (FIMI)	2
Mexican Albums (AMPROFON)	20
New Zealand Albums (RMNZ)	2
Norwegian Albums (VG-lista)	1
Polish Albums (ZPAV)	1
Portuguese Albums (AFP)	3
Scottish Albums (Official Charts)	1
South Korean Albums (Gaon)	67
Spanish Albums (Promusicae)	5
Swedish Albums (Sverigetopplistan)	3
Swiss Albums (Schweizer Hitparade)	1
UK Albums (Official Charts)	3
US Billboard 200	11
US Top Rock Albums (Billboard)	3

=== Year-end charts ===
Chart (2017)	Position
Belgian Albums (Ultratop Flanders)	49
Belgian Albums (Ultratop Wallonia)	30
Dutch Albums (MegaCharts)	49
French Albums (SNEP)	187
German Albums (Offizielle Top 100)	94
Italian Albums (FIMI)	49
Swiss Albums (Schweizer Hitparade)	42
US Top Rock Albums (Billboard)	87

== Certifications ==
Region	Certification	Certified units/sales
Italy (FIMI)	Gold	25,000^{*}
Poland (ZPAV)	Gold	10,000^{‡}
Switzerland (IFPI Switzerland)	Gold	10,000^{‡}
United Kingdom (BPI)	Silver	60,000^{‡}
^{*} Sales figures based on certification alone.^{‡} Sales+streaming figures based on certification alone.
