= Flickering Flame: The Solo Years Volume 1 =

Compilation album by Roger Waters
- Released: 13 May 2002
- Recorded: 1983–2001
- Genre: Art rock
- Length: 70:23
- Label: Columbia
- Producer: Roger Waters; Nick Griffiths; Patrick Leonard; Ian Ritchie; James Guthrie

Roger Waters chronology
In the Flesh – Live (2000)	Flickering Flame: The Solo Years Volume 1 (2002)	Ça Ira (2005)

Professional ratings
Review scores
Source	Rating
AllMusic	4/5 stars
The Rolling Stone Album Guide	3/5 stars

Flickering Flame: The Solo Years Volume 1 is a compilation album of former Pink Floyd member Roger Waters' solo material, released in Europe and Australia in 2002 (see 2002 in music). It was not released in the US and UK until 30 May 2011, when this album along with the rest of the Waters' solo material was released as part of "The Roger Waters Collection" Boxset. The album will be sold separately from the compilation, for a 12-month term.

The original versions of this album were released on CD with a note on the cover saying "will not play on a PC/Mac", due to a form of copy protection. Users of Apple computers reported they were unable to eject CDs with this kind of copy protection.

== Track listing ==
All tracks composed by Roger Waters, except where noted.

No.	Title	Original release	Length
1.	"Knockin' on Heaven's Door" (Bob Dylan)	Previously unreleased, originally featured in The Dybbuk of The Holy Apple Field film	4:06
2.	"Too Much Rope"	Amused to Death	5:12
3.	"The Tide Is Turning"	Radio K.A.O.S.	5:24
4.	"Perfect Sense, Parts I & II" (Live)"	In the Flesh – Live	7:22
5.	"Three Wishes"	Amused to Death	6:49
6.	"5:06 AM (Every Stranger's Eyes)"	The Pros and Cons of Hitch Hiking	4:47
7.	"Who Needs Information"	Radio K.A.O.S.	5:55
8.	"Each Small Candle (Live)"	In the Flesh – Live	8:34
9.	"Flickering Flame (New Demo)"	Previously unreleased	6:45
10.	"Towers of Faith"	When the Wind Blows: Original Motion Picture Soundtrack	6:52
11.	"Radio Waves"	Radio K.A.O.S.	4:31
12.	"Lost Boys Calling (Original Demo)" (Ennio Morricone and Waters)	Previously unreleased, the finished version previously released on The Legend of 1900: Original Motion Picture Soundtrack	4:06
Total length:			1:10:23

== Personnel ==
01 Knockin' On Heaven's Door

- Roger Waters – vocals, bass
- Simon Chamberlain – keyboards
- Clem Clempson – electric/acoustic guitar
- Katie Kissoon – backing vocals
- Nick Griffiths – produced

02 Too Much Rope & 05 Three Wishes

- Roger Waters – words & music, vocals
- Patrick Leonard – keyboards
- Andy Fairweather Low – Rickenbacker 12 string played with a feather
- Geoff Whitehorn – guitars
- Steve Lukather – additional guitars
- James Johnson – bass
- Graham Broad – drums
- Luis Conte – percussion
- Katie Kissoon – background vocals
- Doreen Chanter – background vocals
- Jessica & Jordan Leonard – screaming kids at the end
- National Philharmonic Orchestra
- Patrick Leonard & Roger Waters – produced
- Nick Griffiths – co-produced & recorded
- James Guthrie – mixed

03 The Tide Is Turning, 07 Who Needs Information & 11 Radio Waves

- Roger Waters – words & music, vocals, bass
- Andy Fairweather Low & Jay Stapley – electric guitar
- Mel Collins – saxophones
- Ian Ritchie – fairlight programming, drum programming, piano, keyboards
- Graham Broad – drums and percussion
- Suzanne Rhatigan – main backing vocals
- Ian Ritchie, John Thirkell, Peter Thomas – horn section
- Ian Ritchie – arranged
- Roger Waters & Ian Ritchie – produced

04 Perfect Sense, Part I & II & 08 Each Small Candle

- Roger Waters – words & music, vocals, bass & guitar
- Doyle Bramhall II – guitar
- Snowy White – guitar
- Andy Fairweather Low – guitar, bass & vocal
- Graham Broad – drums
- Jon Carin – keyboards
- Andy Wallace – hammond/keyboards
- Katie Kissoon, Susannah Melvoin, P P Arnold – low vocals
- P P Arnold – solo vocals on Perfect Sense
- James Guthrie – produced & mixed

06 5.06am (Every Stranger's Eyes)

- Roger Waters – words & music, vocals, bass, guitar
- Andy Bown – hammond organ & 12 string guitar
- Ray Cooper – percussion
- Eric Clapton – lead guitar
- Michael Kamen – piano, National Philharmoninc Orchestra conducted & arranged
- Andy Newmark – drums
- David Sanborn – saxophone
- Madeline Bell, Katie Kissoon, Doreen Chanter – backing vocals
- Raphael Ravenscroft, Kevin Flanagan, Vic Sullivan – horns
- Roger Waters & Michael Kamen – produced

09 Flickering Flame

- Roger Waters – words & music, vocals, acoustic guitar, bass
- Jon Carin – keyboards
- Doyle Bramhall II – guitar, bass
- Roger Waters & Nick Griffiths – produced

10 Towers of Faith

- Roger Waters – words & music, vocals
- Matt Irving – keyboards
- Jay Stapely – electric guitar
- John Lingwood – linn programming
- Freddie KRC – drums
- Mel Collins – saxophone
- John Gordon – bass
- Clare Torry – vocals
- Roger Waters – produced
- Nick Griffiths – co-producer & engineer
- Colin Lyon – assistant engineer

12 Lost Boys Calling (original demo)

- Ennio Morricone – music
- Roger Waters – words, vocals
- Rick Wentworth – orchestration
- Nick Griffiths – mixed
