= The Bravery of Being Out of Range =

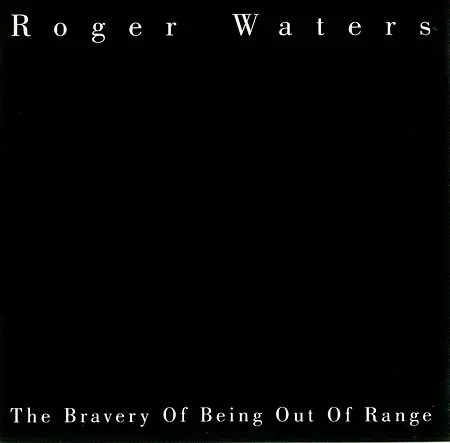

Single by Roger Waters

from the album Amused to Death
- Released: 30 November 1992
- Recorded: 1992
- Genre: Progressive rock
- Length: 4:44
- Label: Columbia
- Songwriter: Roger Waters
- Producer: Roger Waters

Roger Waters singles chronology
"What God Wants, Part I" (1990)	"The Bravery of Being Out of Range" (1992)	"Three Wishes" (1993)

"The Bravery of Being Out of Range" is the fifth song and second single from the album, Amused to Death, released by former Pink Floyd bassist, Roger Waters. According to Waters, the song was written as a criticism of the neoliberal policies adopted by Ronald Reagan and Margaret Thatcher.

== Overview ==
The song follows the point of view of a politician fighting the Gulf War from afar, as though it is a game, continuing the theme explored in the album's previous song, Perfect Sense, where live transmissions of wars are a form of entertainment.

The song includes a reference to a song written by Waters on Pink Floyd's 1977 album Animals, "Sheep", and to the 1909 song "Swing Low, Sweet Chariot". In "Swing Low, Sweet Chariot", the lyrics say, "I looked over Jordan and what did I see? Coming for to carry me home". In "Sheep" Waters sings, "I've looked over Jordan and I have seen, things are not what they seem"; in "The Bravery of Being Out of Range," he sings "I looked over Jordan and what did I see? I saw a U.S. Marine in a pile of debris".

The song was part of the 2015 re-released and remastered edition of the album, this version featured a new lead guitar part performed by Jeff Beck.

== Personnel ==
=== Amused to Death version ===
The following people are credited with the original 1992 version, and the 2015 reissue:

- Roger Waters – vocals, twelve-string guitar
- Patrick Leonard – keyboards, Hammond organ, synthesisers
- Tim Pierce – guitar
- Jeff Beck – lead guitar (2015 reissue only)
- John Pierce – bass
- Denny Fongheiser – drums
- Lynn Fiddmont-Linsey – backing vocals
- Natalie Jackson – backing vocals

=== In the Flesh – Live version ===
From video and album credits

- Roger Waters – electric guitar, vocals
- Doyle Bramhall II – electric guitar
- Andy Fairweather Low – bass guitar
- Snowy White – electric guitar
- Andy Wallace – Hammond organ
- Jon Carin – keyboards
- Katie Kissoon – backing vocals
- Susannah Melvoin – backing vocals
- P. P. Arnold – backing vocals
- Graham Broad – drums, percussion

=== Lockdown sessions version ===
From YouTube video and description

- Roger Waters – piano, vocals
- Dave Kilminster – guitar
- Joey Waronker – drums
- Lucius- Jess Wolfe and Holly Laessig – vocals
- Gus Seyffert – bass
- Jonathan Wilson – guitar
- Jon Carin – piano, keyboards, acoustic guitar (uncredited)
- Bo Koster – Hammond organ

== Live performances ==
The song was performed as part of Waters' In the Flesh tour, playing a similar part to his original 12 string part on an electric guitar. In 2000, a recording of this was released as the sixth track of the second disk of the live album, In the Flesh – Live. This track has a length of 5:05, and features additional vocals by Katie Kissoon, P. P. Arnold, and Susannah Melvoin. Like other songs from Amused to Death performed on the In the Flesh tour, it featured differences, like a new lead guitar part played by Snowy White. This new lead guitar part is similar to the parted added by Jeff Beck to the 2015 re-release.

Waters performed the song at the Newport Folk Festival in 2015, for the first time in 13 years. Waters played the acoustic guitar on this version with My Morning Jacket and G.E Smith performing the rest of the instrumentation.

Waters subsequently performed the song as an encore at some shows during the Us + Them Tour. When performed, Waters sang an additional new verse, created to express his feelings of despair at the lack of change, regarding politics and war, in subsequent years. The same arrangement was performed during his 2022—23 This Is Not a Drill concert series. Waters later released this version officially on The Lockdown Sessions.
