= To Kill the Child/Leaving Beirut =

"To Kill the Child" / "Leaving Beirut"

Single by Roger Waters
- A-side: "To Kill the Child"
- B-side: "Leaving Beirut"
- Released: 2004
- Genre: Progressive rock
- Label: Columbia; Sony Music Japan (CD5)
- Songwriter: Roger Waters
- Producers: Roger Waters and Nick Griffiths

Roger Waters singles chronology
"Three Wishes" (1992)	"To Kill the Child" / "Leaving Beirut" (2004)	"Hello (I Love You)" (2007)

"To Kill the Child"/"Leaving Beirut" is a 2004 digital download and a Japan-only CD single written and performed by Roger Waters.

== "To Kill the Child" ==
The first song of the single runs at 3 minutes and 31 seconds. The lyrics open with the image of a child sleeping "in the glow of [a] Donald Duck light", a reference to Waters' prior song "The Tide Is Turning." Waters goes on to ask why a culture whose primary concerns are luxury, consumption and petty values would "kill the child". The song ends with a plea to protect children from the crusade-waging "bigots and bully boys / Slugging it out in the yard."

== "Leaving Beirut" ==
The second track of the single runs at 12 minutes and 29 seconds. Most of the song's lyrics are derived from a short story about Waters' hitchhiking excursion in Lebanon when he was a teenager. These passages, intoned in monologue over a descending synthesizer ostinato, are interspersed with more recently penned refrains outlining Waters' reaction to United States and United Kingdom involvement in the Iraq War. Waters performed the song at every show on his The Dark Side of the Moon Live tour, replacing the spoken-word recitation with a visual backdrop of the story as a graphic novel.

=== Controversy and criticism ===
Waters' condemnation of George W. Bush (at one point, the song's lyrics claim "that Texas education must have fucked [him] up") received negative reactions from audience members during his show at New Jersey's PNC Bank Arts Center on 6 September 2006, at Madison Square Garden in New York City on 12 September 2006 and in Tampa, Florida on 19 May 2007; however, audience reactions during the 5 October 2006 performance at the Hollywood Bowl were overwhelmingly positive, with many patrons rising to their feet and cheering. The song also received a positive reaction during its American performances at the Boston, Massachusetts and Camden, New Jersey Tweeter Centers, in New York on 30 May 2007, as well as in other cities worldwide, particularly Mumbai and Dubai. Ironically, during his first show in Dallas, Texas on 2 May 2008, the line referring to George Bush and the Texas education was met with uproarious applause. His last show on the American leg of the tour, in Houston on the 4th, was met with a fairly mixed reaction.

While many fans have embraced the song's lyrical content, which is sympathetic towards the people of Lebanon, some have objected to Waters' political stance. In 2006, Waters performed a concert in Neve Shalom, Israel in front of a crowd of 50,000. During the concert, which included "Leaving Beirut" in the set-list, Waters expressed his belief that Israel had to "tear down the walls" of the Israeli West Bank barrier (pictured in the single's cover art) to make peace with its neighbours. The morning after Waters' concert in Neve Shalom, editorial writer Ben Dror Yemini wrote in the Israel newspaper Maariv:

[I]nstead of demonstrating against genocide in Sudan, or arrests in Syria, or the oppression of women in Saudi Arabia, Waters demonstrated against Israel[...] So who made you boss, Mr. Waters? Who are you to preach to us against the separation fence? What do you know about the hundreds of Israelis whose blood was spilled? What do you know about an entire nation that has to protect itself? What do you know about the hundreds of suicide bombers who came here not to kill the occupation, but to kill Jews?

The song has also received some criticism for its musical content and style; one review of the 10 October show at the Shoreline Amphitheater in Mountain View, California claimed that the song "floundered" musically despite being lyrically "one of Waters' best post-Floyd works."

== Track listing ==
All tracks are written by Roger Waters.

No.	Title	Length
1.	"To Kill the Child"	3:31
2.	"Leaving Beirut"	12:29
Total length:		16:00

== Personnel ==
- Roger Waters – vocals, guitar, bass, keyboards, producer
- Andy Fairweather Low – guitar
- Graham Broad – drums
- Carol Kenyon – vocals
- Katie Kissoon – vocals
- P. P. Arnold – vocals
- Nick Griffiths – producer, engineer

== See also ==
- List of anti-war songs
