= The Dark Side of the Moon Live =

2006–08 concert tour by Roger Waters

- Tour by Roger Waters
- Promotional poster for the tour
- Location: Asia; Australia; Europe; Latin America; New Zealand; North America
- Associated album: The Dark Side of the Moon
- Start date: 2 June 2006
- End date: 6 June 2008
- Legs: 7
- No. of shows: 119

Roger Waters concert chronology
- In the Flesh (1999–2002); The Dark Side of the Moon Live (2006–08); The Wall Live (2010–13)

The Dark Side of the Moon Live was a worldwide concert tour by Roger Waters, lasting two years. Waters and his band performed the titular album in its entirety at each show, beginning at the Rock in Rio festival on 2 June 2006.

The tour featured elaborate stage design by Mark Fisher, who in the past designed the stage for Pink Floyd's The Wall Tour, including giant puppets, large video screen displays and a 360° quadraphonic sound system. The performances were divided into two sets: the first being a collection of Pink Floyd material along with songs from Roger's solo career, and the second The Dark Side of the Moon in its entirety, plus encores.

Pink Floyd's iconic pig was used extensively during the tour, introduced on 6 September 2006, the opening night of the North American leg, and since appearing at almost every venue. During the tour, the pig often carried messages critical of the American government, Waters' socialist views, and the support of repressed Latin American populations, including indictments of discrimination and calls for the further prosecution of former dictators.

== The Performers ==
Waters retained much of the backing band from his 1999–2002 In the Flesh tours, including guitarists Snowy White and Andy Fairweather-Low, backing vocalists Katie Kissoon and P.P. Arnold, plus Graham Broad on drums. Guitarist Dave Kilminster, along with Waters and Jon Carin, sang much of the lead vocal parts performed by David Gilmour and Rick Wright on the original Pink Floyd recordings. Andrew Latimer, leader of the progressive rock group Camel was auditioned to be lead guitarist and Gilmour's vocal replacement on the tour, but it was felt his voice could not reach the same high notes, although his guitar playing (often compared to Gilmour's) was exemplary.

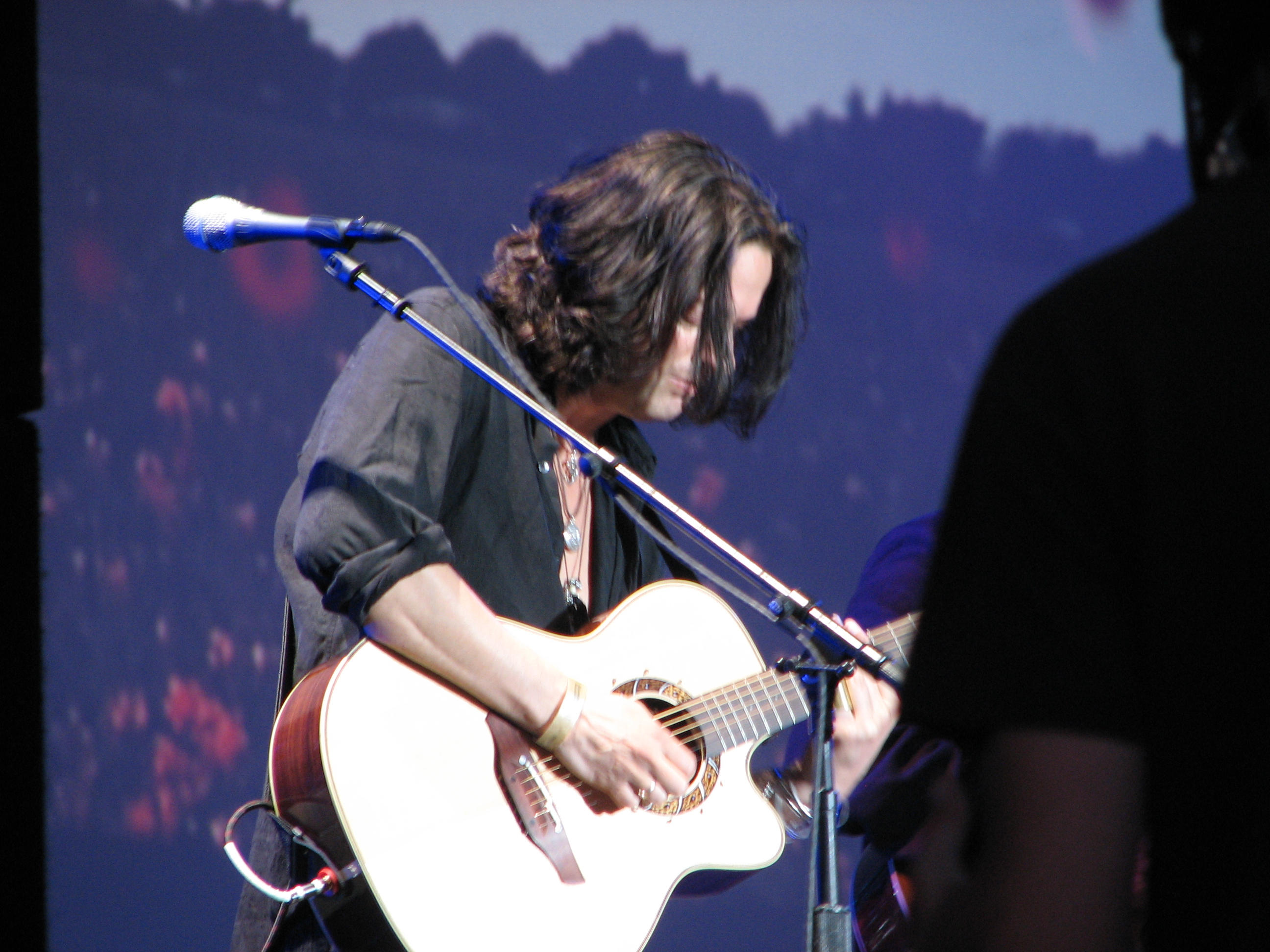
Dave Kilminster performing with Waters at the Arrow Rock Festival, 10 June 2006

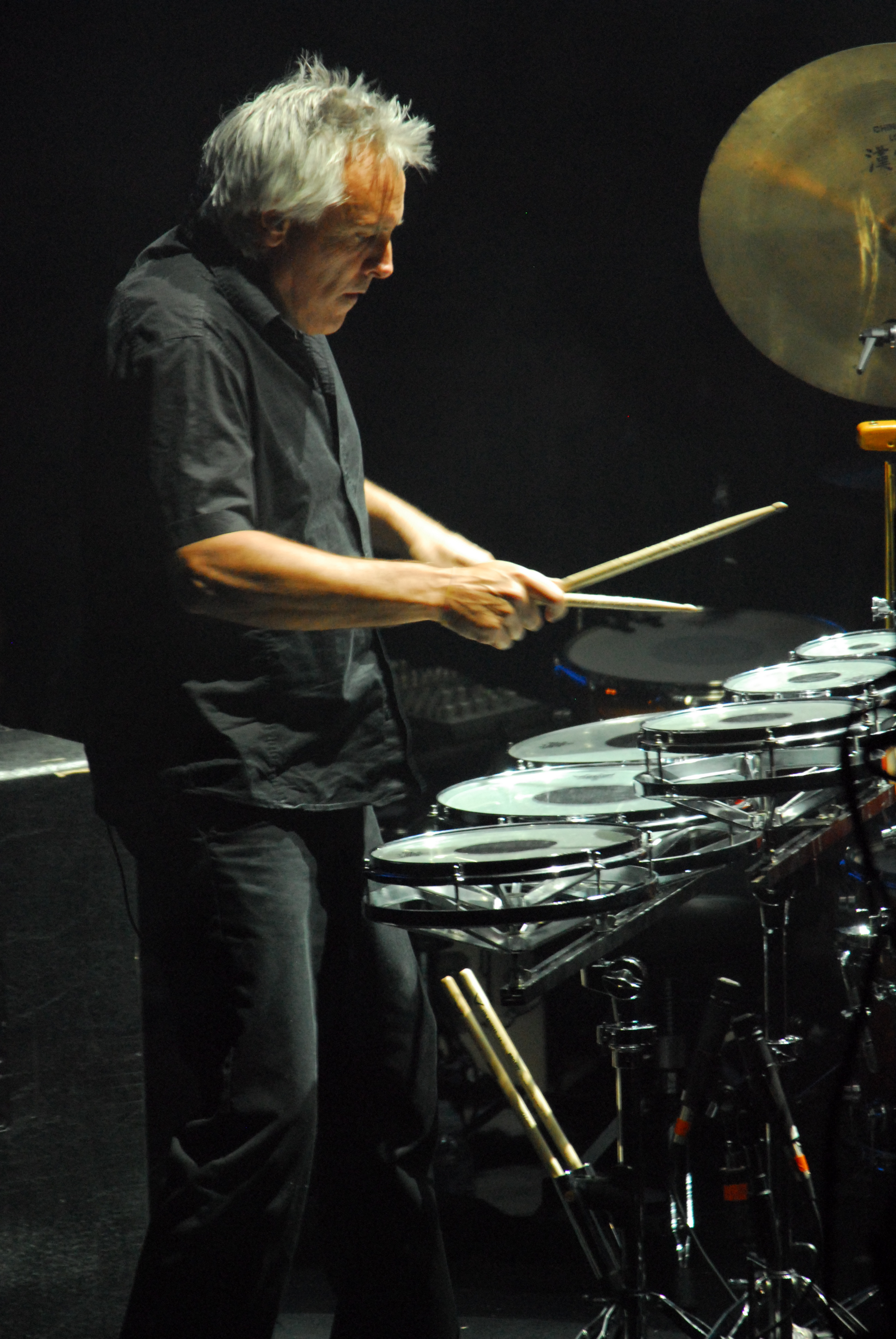
Graham Broad Performs "Time" with Roger Waters in Ottawa 6 June 2007

=== Personnel 2006–2007 ===
- Roger Waters – Vocals, bass guitar and acoustic guitar
- Snowy White – Guitar (former member of Thin Lizzy, played with Pink Floyd in 1977 and 1980).
- Dave Kilminster – Guitar, vocals and additional bass (has toured with Keith Emerson and Spinal Tap).
- Andy Fairweather-Low – Guitar, bass and backing vocals (has toured and recorded with George Harrison, The Who, Who member Pete Townshend, and Eric Clapton).
- Jon Carin – Synthesiser, piano, guitar, lap steel guitar and vocals (has toured with Waters in the past, as well as with the post-Waters Pink Floyd, Floyd guitarist David Gilmour, and The Who).
- Harry Waters – Hammond organ, synthesiser (Roger Waters' son).
- Carol Kenyon – Backing vocals, percussion, lead vocals on "The Great Gig in the Sky" (session singer who has recorded for Van Morrison and Tears for Fears).
- Katie Kissoon – Backing vocals, percussion, lead vocals on "Mother" (backed the likes of Elton John, Clapton, Van Morrison, and many others).
- P.P. Arnold – Backing vocals, percussion, lead vocals on "Perfect Sense" (former backing band member for Ike and Tina Turner), backing vocals, percussion. Solo artist, who sang the original version of "First Cut Is The Deepest", and "Angel Of the Morning", produced by Andrew Oldham, Mick Jagger, Mike Hurst, Barry Gibb, Eric Clapton, and Steve Cradock. (Her original touring band The Nice was led by Keith Emerson, later toured on their own) backing vocals with Peter Gabriel and many others.
- Ian Ritchie – Saxophone, EWI and additional bass
- Graham Broad – Drums and percussion (part of former Rolling Stones member Bill Wyman's band The Rhythm Kings).

Most of the touring band for Waters has toured with him and other Pink Floyd members for many years and even recorded with them in a few instances.

Waters' former Pink Floyd bandmate Nick Mason played drums alongside Broad at the 12 June show in Iceland, the 29 June show in Ireland, the 1 July show at Hyde Park in London, the 12 July show in Italy, and the 14 July show in France. During the North American tour, he performed at both Madison Square Garden shows and all three nights at the Hollywood Bowl. On 12 May at Earls Court in London, Mason was introduced on stage to play the second set, the whole of The Dark Side of the Moon and the encores by Waters.

=== Personnel 2008 ===
A small personnel change was made due to two of the band members having already booked April and May 2008. Chester Kamen replaced Andy Fairweather-Low on guitars, bass and backing vocals. Chester toured with Waters in 2002 during the third year of the In The Flesh tour, back then replacing Doyle Bramhall II. Kamen is the brother of pop singer Nick Kamen. Sylvia Mason-James replaced Katie Kissoon on backing vocals. Mason-James also toured with the Pet Shop Boys. These Roger Waters concerts were the first without Fairweather-Low since 1984, when he replaced Tim Renwick, and the first ever without Kissoon (apart from Wall concert in Berlin in 1990, which utilized the male backing singers from the original tour.)

- Roger Waters – Vocals, bass guitar and acoustic guitar
- Snowy White – Guitar (former member of Thin Lizzy, played with Pink Floyd in 1977 and 1980).
- Dave Kilminster – Guitar, vocals and additional bass (has toured with Keith Emerson and Spinal Tap).
- Chester Kamen – Guitar, bass and backing vocals (Toured with Waters in 2002 on the In The Flesh Tour).
- Jon Carin – Synthesiser, piano, guitar, lap steel guitar and vocals (has toured with Waters in the past, as well as with the post-Waters Pink Floyd, Floyd guitarist David Gilmour, and The Who).
- Harry Waters – Hammond organ, synthesiser (Roger Waters' son).
- Carol Kenyon – Backing vocals, percussion, lead vocals on "The Great Gig in the Sky" and "Mother" (session singer who has recorded for Van Morrison and Tears for Fears).
- Sylvia Mason-James – Backing vocals, percussion (toured with the Pet Shop Boys)
- P.P. Arnold – Backing vocals, percussion, lead vocals on "Perfect Sense" (former backing band member for Ike and Tina Turner.)backing vocals, percussion (former backing band member for Ike and Tina Turner. Solo Artist, who sang the original version of "First Cut Is The Deepest" and "Angel Of the Morning", produced by Andrew Oldham, Mick Jagger, Mike Hurst, Barry Gibb, Eric Clapton, Steve Cradock. Her original touring band ´The Nice´ was led by Keith Emerson, and later toured on their own) backing vocals with Peter Gabriel and so many others.
- Ian Ritchie – Saxophone, EWI and additional bass
- Graham Broad – Drums and percussion (part of former Rolling Stones member Bill Wyman's band The Rhythm Kings).

== Set list ==
The tour's set list remained constant after 8 June 2006. Earlier shows' sets differed in that they featured "The Gunner's Dream" along with a different running order. A power outage at the 29 June 2006 show forced an early intermission, and so the second set featured "Leaving Beirut" and "Sheep" before The Dark Side of the Moon.

Set one

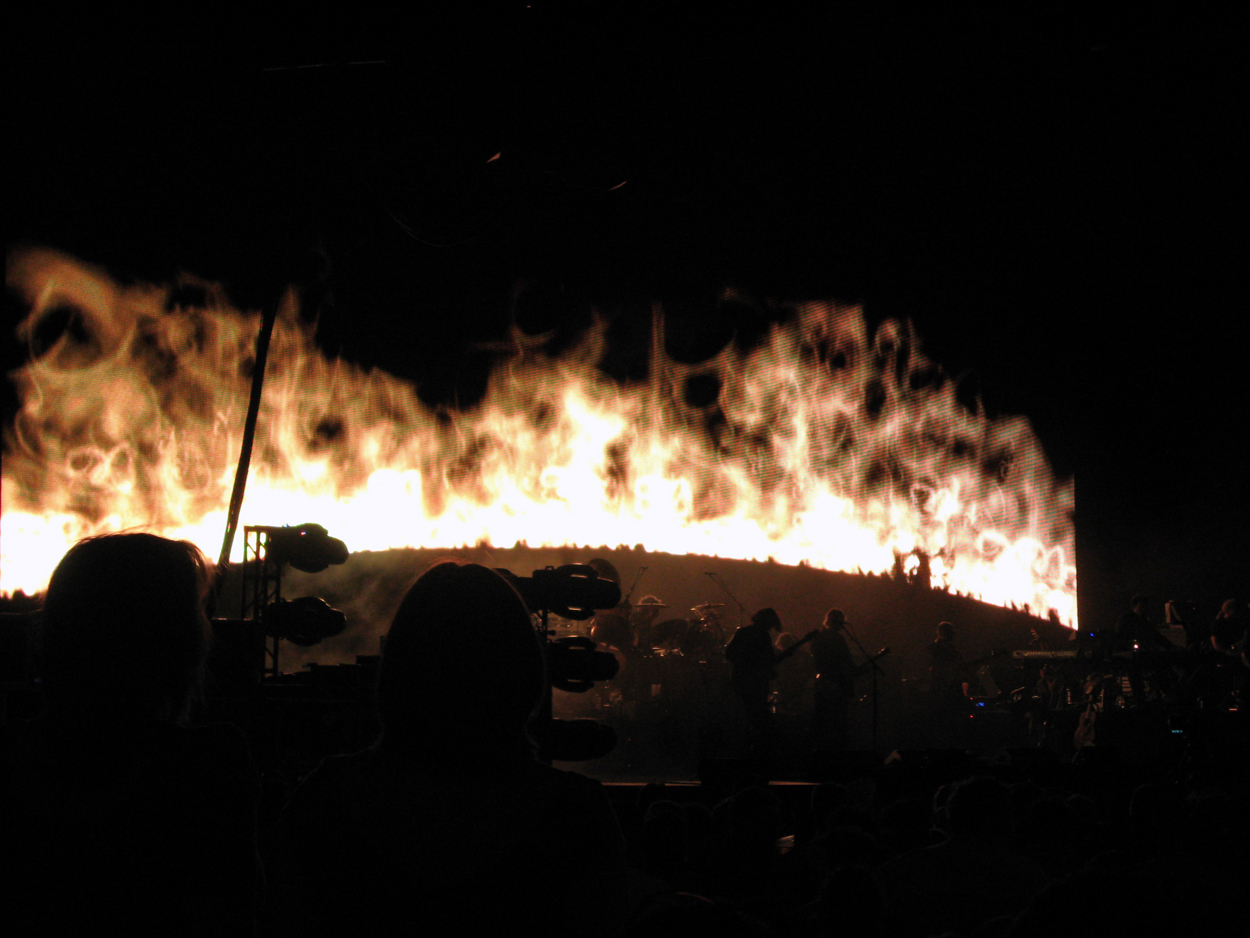
Roger Waters and his band performing Pink Floyd's "Set the Controls for the Heart of the Sun"

1. "In the Flesh"
2. "Mother"
3. "Set the Controls for the Heart of the Sun"
4. "Shine On You Crazy Diamond (Parts II–V)" (abridged)
5. "Have a Cigar"
6. "Wish You Were Here"
7. "Southampton Dock"
8. "The Fletcher Memorial Home"
9. "Perfect Sense"
10. "Leaving Beirut"
11. "Sheep"

Set two: The Dark Side of the Moon

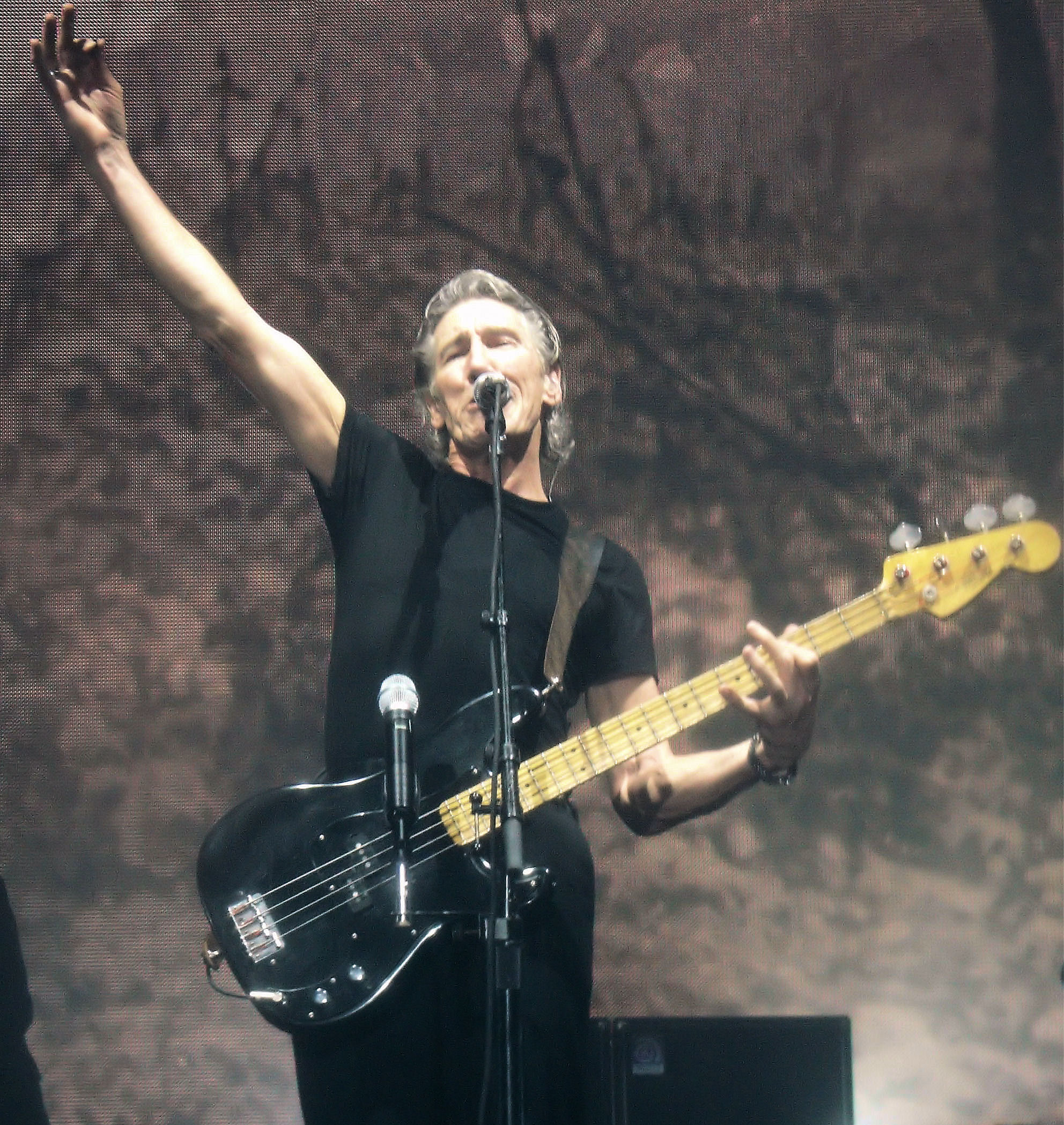
Roger Waters performing Dark Side of the Moon Live in 2007

12. "Speak to Me" / "Breathe"
13. "On the Run"
14. "Time / Breathe (Reprise)"
15. "The Great Gig in the Sky"
16. "Money"
17. "Us and Them"
18. "Any Colour You Like"
19. "Brain Damage"
20. "Eclipse"

Encore

21. "The Happiest Days of Our Lives"
22. "Another Brick in the Wall (Part 2)"
23. "Vera"
24. "Bring the Boys Back Home"
25. "Comfortably Numb"

== DVD release ==
According to an interview with Roger's manager, a DVD of the tour is in the works but until it is finished there will be no release date. At different points in 2009–2011, a DVD document was rumoured to be coming soon but to no avail.

== Tour images ==
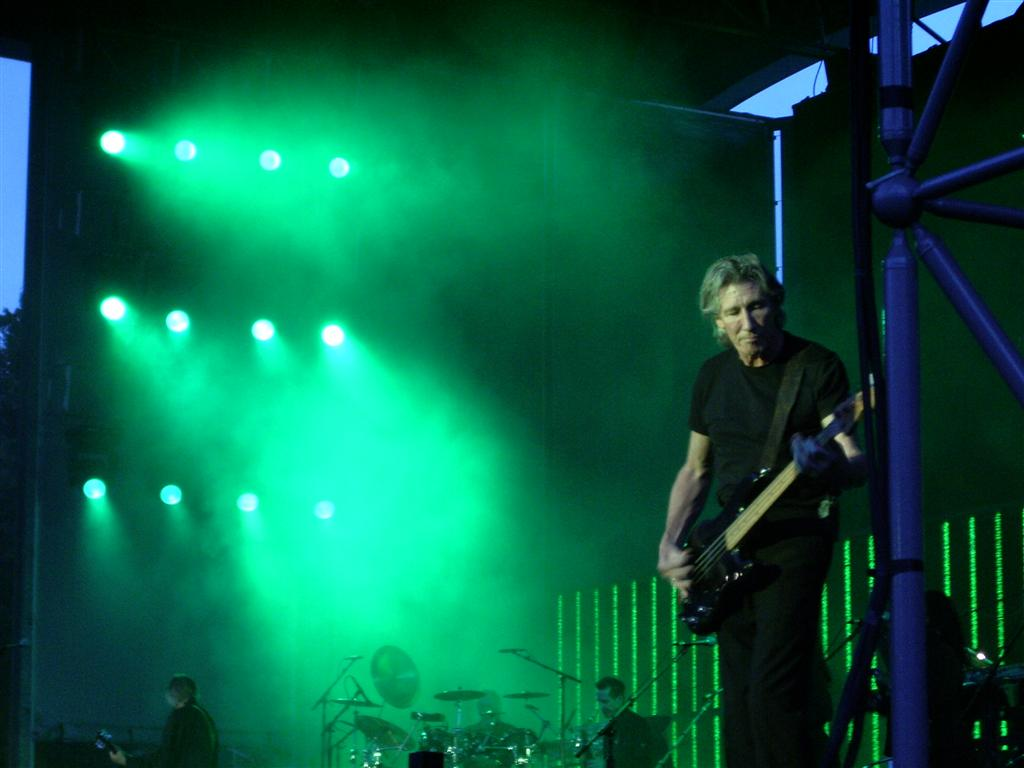
Roger Waters live at Wuhlheide, Berlin on 8 June 2006

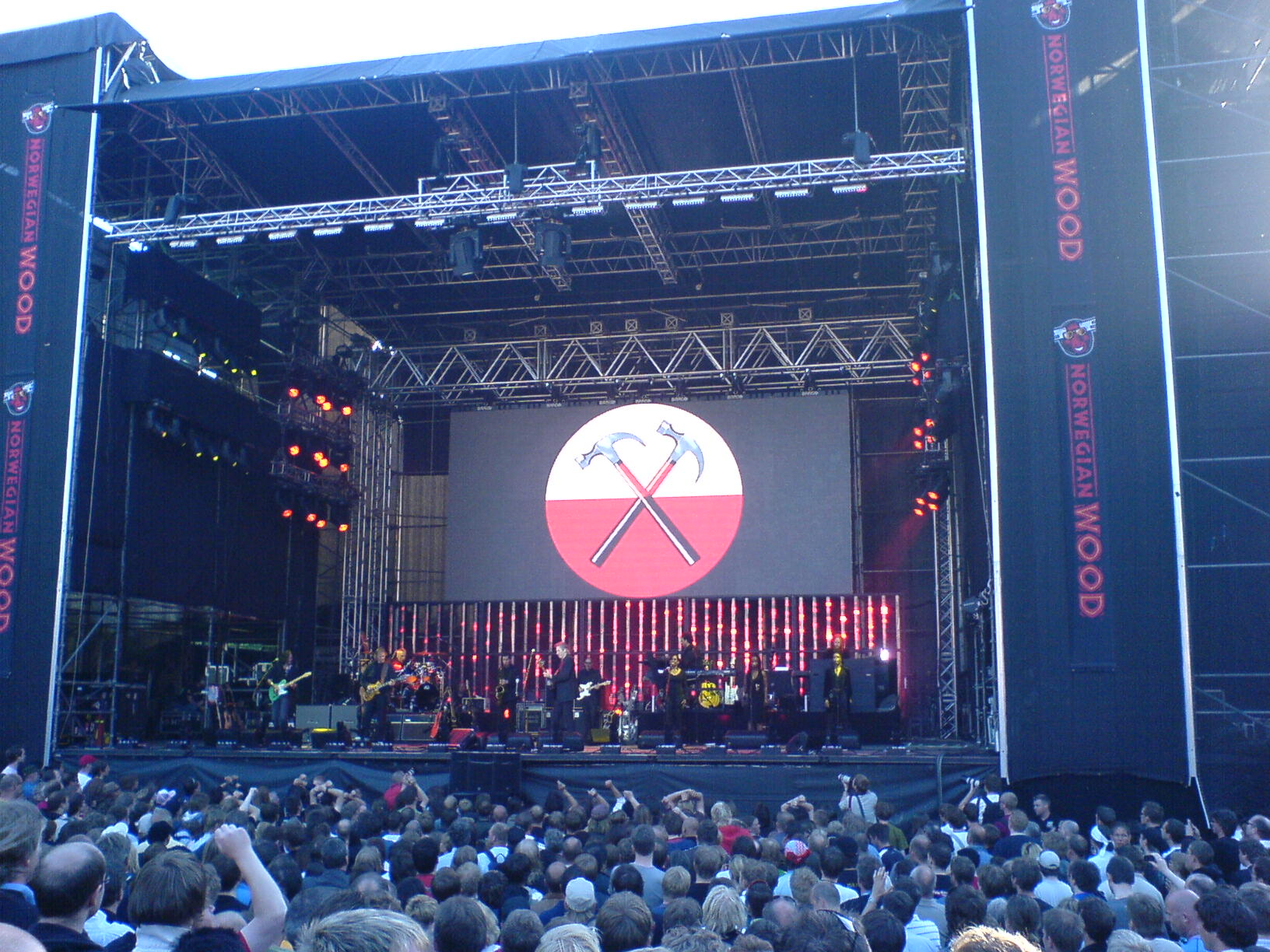
Roger Waters live at Norwegian Wood festival on 14 June 2006

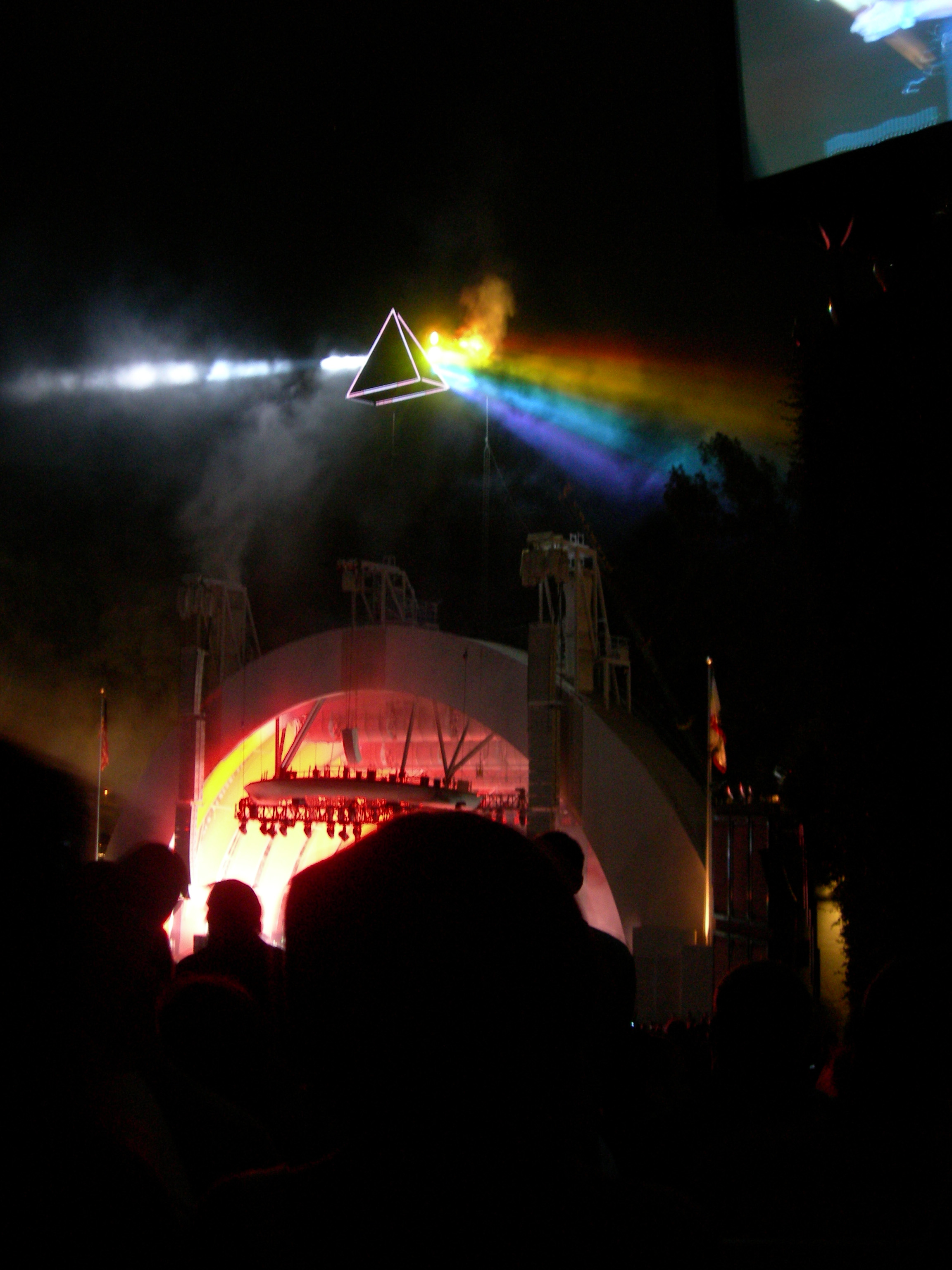
"Eclipse" live at Hollywood Bowl on 5 October 2006

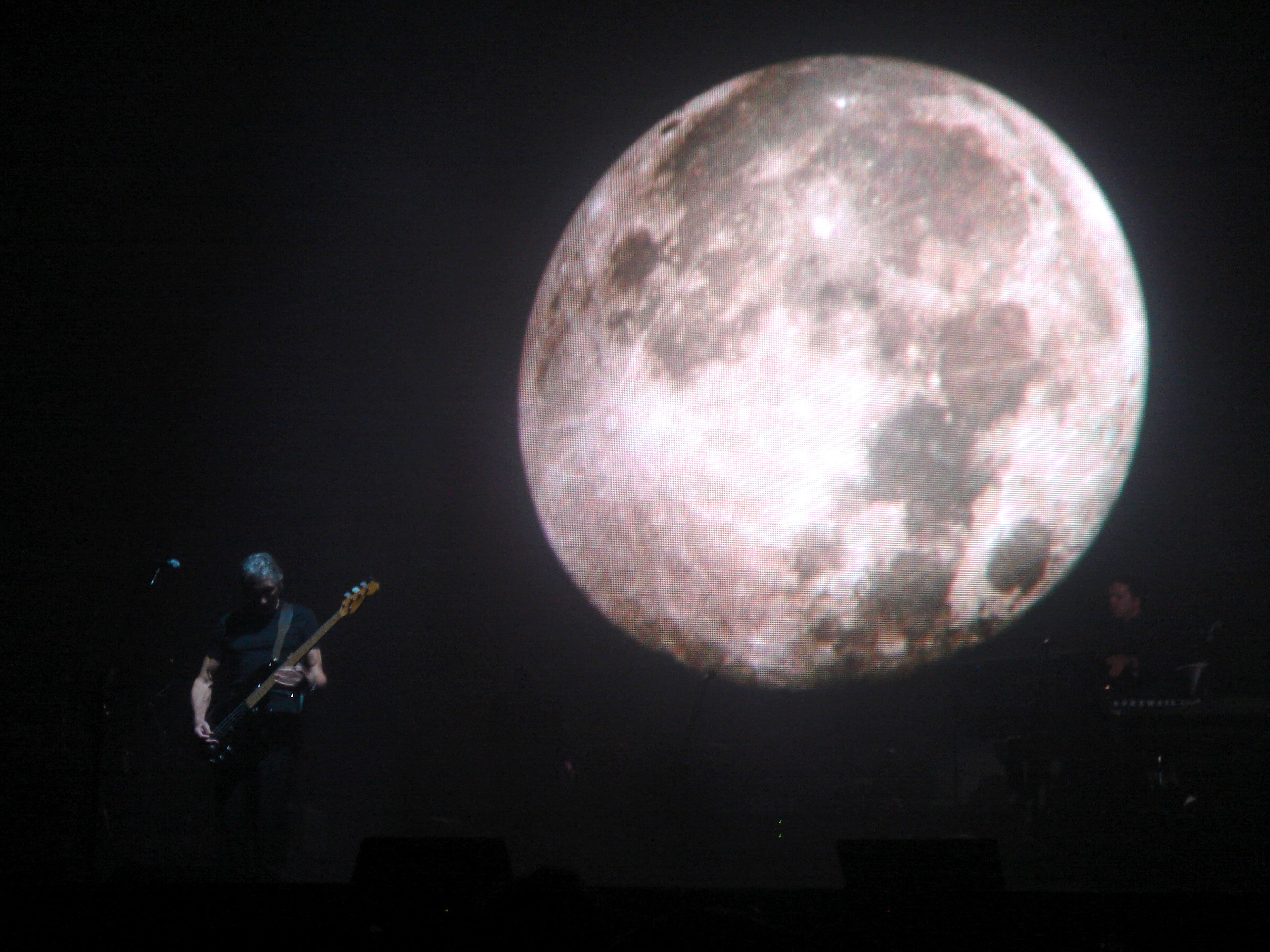
Roger Waters. Palau Sant Jordi, Barcelona, on 21 April 2007

== Tour dates ==
Waters announced that he would be performing 62 more dates worldwide in 2007. The tour resumed in late January and February with shows in Australia, New Zealand, India, Hong Kong, and China. More shows in South America and Europe, including the UK, followed, with 27 US and Canadian dates in June and July.

On 17 December 2007 it was announced that Roger Waters would play a single one-off show in Odense, Denmark 13 May 2008., but on 19 December, only two days later than the first announcement, it was announced he would also play at the Pinkpop Festival in The Netherlands 11 May 2008. On 21 January 2008, a big rumour and a lot of speculation was finally put to rest when it was announced that Roger will also play the annual Coachella Valley Music and Arts Festival in California, on Sunday, 27 April, as the final night's headliner.

On 3 February it was announced that Waters would also play in Denver, Colorado, on 30 April, almost eight years since he last played there, on 3 July 2000, during the In The Flesh tour. Two more US dates were confirmed, Dallas on 2 May and Houston on 4 May, both in the state of Texas, again almost 8 years since he has played in the area. On 20 February, another European date was announced, this time in Granada, Spain, 9 May.

On 26 February, what were supposed to be the last dates of the tour as confirmed by Roger Waters' manager, were announced, two concerts in England, 15 May in Liverpool and 18 May in London. Finally, on 5 March a second London show was announced.

The final show of the tour took place on 6 June at the Palace Square in Saint Petersburg, Russia during White Nights.

Date	City	Country	Venue	Tickets sold / available	Revenue
Leg 1: Europe
2 June 2006 (1)	Lisbon	Portugal	Parque da Bela Vista		
4 June 2006	Verona	Italy	Verona Arena	22,000 / 26,000	$1,470,366
5 June 2006	Verona	Italy	Verona Arena		
8 June 2006	Berlin	Germany	Kindl-Bühne Wuhlheide	13,422 / 15,000	$863,217
10 June 2006 (2)	Lichtenvoorde	Netherlands	Achterhoek		
12 June 2006 (3)	Reykjavík	Iceland	Egilshöll		
14 June 2006 (4)	Oslo	Norway	Frognerbadet		
16 June 2006	Rome	Italy	Stadio Olimpico	13,906 / 18,000	$750,692
18 June 2006	Attica	Greece	Terra Vibe Park		
20 June 2006	Istanbul	Turkey	Turkcell Kuruçeşme Arena	12,000 / 14,000	$967,624
22 June 2006	Latrun	Israel	Neve Shalom	55,000	$4,680,000
24 June 2006	Moscow	Russia	Red Square		
26 June 2006	Stavanger	Norway	Viking Stadion		
29 June 2006 (5)	Cork	Ireland	Marquee Showgrounds (with Nick Mason)		
1 July 2006 (6)	London	England	Hyde Park (with Nick Mason)		
2 July 2006 (7)	Roskilde	Denmark	Roskilde Festivalgrounds		
7 July 2006	Rotterdam	Netherlands	Rotterdam Ahoy	9,547 / 9,547	$722,783
10 July 2006	Swieqi	Malta	Luxol Fields		
12 July 2006 (3)	Lucca	Italy	Piazza Napoleone	10,795 / 11,000	$569,592
14 July 2006 (3)	Nevers	France	Circuit de Nevers Magny-Cours		
16 July 2006 (8)	Locarno	Switzerland	Piazza Grande		
Leg 2: North America
6 September 2006	Holmdel Township	United States	PNC Bank Arts Center	15,279 / 15,457	$1,068,411
8 September 2006	Mansfield	United States	Tweeter Center		
9 September 2006	Mansfield	United States	Tweeter Center		
12 September 2006 (3)	New York City	United States	Madison Square Garden	29,488 / 29,488	$2,722,257
13 September 2006 (3)	New York City	United States	Madison Square Garden	29,488 / 29,488	$2,722,257
15 September 2006	Wantagh	United States	Nikon at Jones Beach Theater	14,046 / 14,119	$1,068,651
16 September 2006	Camden	United States	Tweeter Center	24,963 / 24,963	$1,245,885
18 September 2006	Auburn Hills	United States	The Palace of Auburn Hills	12,101 / 14,693	$911,424
20 September 2006	Toronto	Canada	Air Canada Centre	15,282 / 15,282	$1,381,277
21 September 2006	Montreal	Canada	Bell Centre		
23 September 2006	Bristow	United States	Nissan Pavilion		
24 September 2006	Burgettstown	United States	Post-Gazette Pavilion		
27 September 2006	Cleveland	United States	Quicken Loans Arena		
29 September 2006	Tinley Park	United States	First Midwest Bank Amphitheatre		
30 September 2006	Noblesville	United States	Verizon Wireless	19,734 / 24,474	$1,105,577
3 October 2006	Phoenix	United States	Cricket Wireless Pavilion		
5 October 2006 (3)	Los Angeles	United States	Hollywood Bowl	50,321 / 50,321	$4,484,902
6 October 2006 (3)	Los Angeles	United States	Hollywood Bowl	50,321 / 50,321	$4,484,902
8 October 2006 (3)	Los Angeles	United States	Hollywood Bowl	50,321 / 50,321	$4,484,902
10 October 2006	Mountain View	United States	Shoreline Amphitheatre		
12 October 2006	Seattle	United States	KeyArena		
Leg 3: 2007 Australia, New Zealand & Asian tour dates
25 January 2007	Sydney	Australia	Acer Arena	10,668 / 12,607	$1,347,091
27 January 2007	Christchurch	New Zealand	AMI Stadium	14,032 / 14,733	$1,275,191
29 January 2007	Auckland	New Zealand	North Harbour Stadium	19,425 / 19,885	$2,658,331
1 February 2007	Melbourne	Australia	Rod Laver Arena	19,596 / 22,450	$2,510,478
2 February 2007	Melbourne	Australia	Rod Laver Arena		
5 February 2007	Brisbane	Australia	Brisbane Entertainment Centre	9,505 / 9,588	$1,278,039
7 February 2007	Adelaide	Australia	Adelaide Entertainment Centre	6,864 / 6,990	$857,127
9 February 2007	Perth	Australia	Perth Oval	11,215 / 11,615	$1,469,613
12 February 2007	Shanghai	China	Shanghai Grand Stage	6,212 / 6,800	$341,660
15 February 2007	Hong Kong	China	Convention & Exhibition Centre	6,748 / 6,991	$567,778
18 February 2007	Mumbai	India	MMRDA Grounds	12,137 / 12,200	$425,489
21 February 2007	Dubai	United Arab Emirates	Media City	12,251 / 12,300	$1,898,905
Leg 4: Latin America
2 March 2007	Monterrey	Mexico	Estadio Universitario	20,279 / 27,220	$886,909
4 March 2007	Guadalajara	Mexico	Estadio Tres de Marzo	21,707 / 22,224	$1,307,088
6 March 2007	Mexico City	Mexico	Foro Sol	54,344 / 54,344	$2,692,145
9 March 2007	Bogotá	Colombia	Simón Bolívar Park	15,536 / 18,200	$1,238,361
12 March 2007	Lima	Peru	Estadio Monumental	13,293 / 15,451	$966,003
14 March 2007	Santiago	Chile	Estadio Nacional	46,166 / 50,000	$2,259,940
17 March 2007	Buenos Aires	Argentina	Estadio Monumental Antonio Vespucio Liberti	107,844 / 116,692	$4,803,326
18 March 2007	Buenos Aires	Argentina	Estadio Monumental Antonio Vespucio Liberti	107,844 / 116,692	$4,803,326
23 March 2007	Rio de Janeiro	Brazil	Praça da Apoteose	34,833 / 38,040	$1,650,950
24 March 2007	São Paulo	Brazil	Estádio do Morumbi	42,321 / 47,978	$3,067,106
Leg 5: Europe
11 April 2007	Zurich	Switzerland	Hallenstadion		
13 April 2007	Prague	Czech Republic	Sazka Arena		
14 April 2007	Budapest	Hungary	Papp László Budapest Sportaréna		
16 April 2007	Cologne	Germany	Cologne Arena		
18 April 2007	Leipzig	Germany	Leipzig Arena		
19 April 2007	Hamburg	Germany	Colour Line Arena		
21 April 2007	Barcelona	Spain	Palau Sant Jordi		
23 April 2007	Milan	Italy	Datchforum		
25 April 2007	Antwerp	Belgium	Sportpaleis Merksem		
27 April 2007	Stockholm	Sweden	Globen		
29 April 2007	Bergen	Norway	Vestlandshallen		
1 May 2007	Soenderborg	Denmark	Augustenborg		
3 May 2007	Paris	France	Palais Omnisports de Paris-Bercy		
5 May 2007	Arnhem	Netherlands	Gelredome		
7 May 2007	Manchester	England	Manchester Evening Arena		
8 May 2007	Birmingham	England	NEC Arena		
11 May 2007	London	England	Earls Court Exhibition Centre		
12 May 2007 (3)	London	England	Earls Court Exhibition Centre		
14 May 2007	Dublin	Ireland	The Point Theatre	8,280 / 8,280	$970,182
Leg 6: North America
18 May 2007	West Palm Beach	United States	Sound Advice Amphitheatre	19,381 / 19,381	$1,000,052
19 May 2007	Tampa	United States	Ford Amphitheatre	19,366 / 19,366	$1,030,400
22 May 2007	Atlanta	United States	Philips Arena	12,204 / 13,525	$1,158,623
24 May 2007	East Rutherford	United States	Continental Airlines Arena	13,945 / 13,945	$1,271,704
30 May 2007	New York City	United States	Madison Square Garden	15,217 / 15,217	$1,411,844
1 June 2007	Philadelphia	United States	Wachovia Center	28,692 / 28,692	$2,753,651
2 June 2007	Philadelphia	United States	Wachovia Center	28,692 / 28,692	$2,753,651
4 June 2007	Quebec City	Canada	Colisée Pepsi	9,414 / 9,530	$1,007,119
6 June 2007	Ottawa	Canada	Scotiabank Place	10,937 / 12,898	$1,202,327
7 June 2007	Montreal	Canada	Bell Centre	12,896 / 13,351	$1,413,522
9 June 2007	Chicago	United States	United Center	14,372 / 14,736	$1,498,817
13 June 2007	Los Angeles	United States	Hollywood Bowl	16,790 / 16,790	$1,402,454
15 June 2007	Irvine	United States	Verizon Wireless Amphitheatre	16,037 / 16,037	$1,195,129
16 June 2007	Paradise	United States	MGM Grand Las Vegas	13,145 / 13,145	$1,386,402
19 June 2007	Oakland	United States	Oracle Arena	13,008 / 13,008	$1,357,056
21 June 2007	Vancouver	Canada	GM Place	12,678 / 14,202	$1,394,640
23 June 2007	Calgary	Canada	Pengrowth Saddledome	11,642 / 12,254	$1,399,887
24 June 2007	Edmonton	Canada	Rexall Place	10,654 / 12,369	$1,023,978
27 June 2007	Winnipeg	Canada	MTS Centre	9,710 / 11,454	$1,105,123
29 June 2007	Omaha	United States	Qwest Center Omaha		
30 June 2007	Saint Paul	United States	Xcel Energy Center	14,326 / 15,873	$1,091,829
2 July 2007	Milwaukee	United States	Marcus Amphitheater		
7 July 2007 (9)	East Rutherford	United States	Giants Stadium	46,160 / 50,010	$6,090,704
9 July 2007	Boston	United States	TD Banknorth Garden		
10 July 2007	Hartford	United States	New England Dodge Music Center		
12 July 2007	Corfu	United States	Darien Lake Performing Arts Center		
14 July 2007	Toronto	Canada	Rogers Centre		
Leg 7: 2008 North America & Europe
27 April 2008	Indio	United States	Coachella Valley Music and Arts Festival		
30 April 2008	Denver	United States	Pepsi Center		
2 May 2008	Dallas	United States	SuperPages.com Center		
4 May 2008	The Woodlands	United States	Cynthia Woods Mitchell Pavilion		
9 May 2008	Granada	Spain	Campo de Futbol de Atarfe		
11 May 2008	Landgraaf	Netherlands	Megaland		
13 May 2008	Odense	Denmark	Fionia Park		
15 May 2008	Liverpool	England	Echo Arena	9,335 / 9,335	$906,913
18 May 2008	London	England	The O_{2} Arena	24,817 / 26,000	$2,556,224
19 May 2008	London	England	The O_{2} Arena	24,817 / 26,000	$2,556,224
6 June 2008	Saint Petersburg	Russia	Palace Square		

(1) - The show of 2 June 2006 as part of Rock in Rio Lisboa

(2) - The show of 10 June 2006 as part of Arrow Rock Festival

(3) - These shows are with Nick Mason

(4) - The show of 14 June 2006 as part of Norwegian Wood

(5) - The show of 29 June 2006 as part of Live at the Marquee

(6) - The show of 1 July 2006 as part of Hyde Park Calling

(7) - The show of 2 July 2006 as part of Roskilde Festival

(8) - The show of 16 July 2006 as part of Moon and Stars Festival

(9) - The show of 7 July 2007 as part of Live Earth

== See also ==
- Inflatable pigs on Roger Waters' tours
