= In the Flesh – Live =

Live album by Roger Waters
- Released: 5 December 2000
- Recorded: 16–27 June 2000
- Genre: Progressive rock
- Length: 147:35
- Label: Columbia
- Producer: James Guthrie

Roger Waters chronology
Amused to Death (1992)	In the Flesh – Live (2000)	Flickering Flame: The Solo Years Volume 1 (2002)

Roger Waters live chronology
The Wall – Live in Berlin (1990)	In the Flesh – Live (2000)	Roger Waters: The Wall (2014)

Professional ratings
Review scores
Source	Rating
AllMusic	3.5/5 stars
Progarchives	4/5 stars
Rolling Stone	2/5 stars
The Rolling Stone Album Guide	3/5 stars

In the Flesh – Live is a two-disc live album that captures performances from Roger Waters' three-year In the Flesh tour. He states to Classic Rock that "I've been involved in two absolutely classic albums – The Dark Side of the Moon and The Wall. And if you haven't got Amused to Death, you haven't got the full set. So this album – the live one, which pulls together songs from all three albums – hopefully redresses the balance." The album features selected songs from a number of Pink Floyd albums, Waters' solo efforts and a new song, "Each Small Candle".

A DVD of the same title was also produced, and the two were released in a new package in 2006. A SACD featuring both stereo and 5.1 mixes was also released. The material for the DVD was taken from a 27 June 2000 performance at the Rose Garden Arena in Portland, Oregon, while the double CD contains various recordings drawn from four performances in Phoenix, AZ; Las Vegas, NV; Irvine, CA and Portland, OR.

== Track listing ==
All songs written, composed and with lead vocals by Roger Waters, except where noted.

=== Disc one ===
No.	Title	Writer(s)	Lead vocals	Length
1.	"In the Flesh" (from The Wall, 1979)			4:41
2.	"The Happiest Days of Our Lives" (The Wall)			1:34
3.	"Another Brick in the Wall, Part II" (The Wall)			5:53
4.	"Mother" (The Wall)		Roger Waters and Katie Kissoon	5:37
5.	"Get Your Filthy Hands Off My Desert" (The Final Cut, 1983)			0:56
6.	"Southampton Dock" (The Final Cut)			2:15
7.	"Pigs on the Wing, Part 1" (Animals, 1977)			1:18
8.	"Dogs" (Animals)	Waters, David Gilmour	Jon Carin, Roger Waters and Doyle Bramhall II	16:26
9.	"Welcome to the Machine" (Wish You Were Here, 1975)			6:57
10.	"Wish You Were Here" (Wish You Were Here)	Gilmour, Waters		4:54
11.	"Shine on You Crazy Diamond, Pts. I–VIII" (Wish You Were Here)	Gilmour, Waters, Richard Wright		14:42
12.	"Set the Controls for the Heart of the Sun" (A Saucerful of Secrets, 1968)			7:15
Total length:				1:12:28

=== Disc two ===
No.	Title	Writer(s)	Lead vocals	Length
1.	"Speak to Me/Breathe (In the Air)^{[note A]}" (The Dark Side of the Moon, 1973)	Nick Mason/Gilmour, Waters, Wright	Doyle Bramhall II and Jon Carin	3:22
2.	"Time" (The Dark Side of the Moon)	Gilmour, Mason, Waters, Wright	Roger Waters and Doyle Bramhall II	6:24
3.	"Money" (The Dark Side of the Moon)		Doyle Bramhall II	6:11
4.	"5:06 AM (Every Stranger's Eyes)^{[note B]}" (The Pros and Cons of Hitch Hiking, 1984)			5:19
5.	"Perfect Sense, Pt. 1 & 2" (Amused to Death, 1992)		Roger Waters and P.P. Arnold	7:26
6.	"The Bravery of Being Out of Range" (Amused to Death)			5:05
7.	"It's a Miracle" (Amused to Death)			8:12
8.	"Amused to Death" (Amused to Death)		Roger Waters and Katie Kissoon	9:24
9.	"Brain Damage" (The Dark Side of the Moon)			4:07
10.	"Eclipse" (The Dark Side of the Moon)			2:18
11.	"Comfortably Numb" (The Wall)	Gilmour, Waters	Roger Waters and Doyle Bramhall II	8:10
12.	"Each Small Candle^{[note C]}"			9:18
Total length:				1:15:16

==== Notes ====
A. "Speak to Me" is not listed in the album sleeve, but is played before "Breathe (In the Air)".
B. The album sleeve listed the song as "The Pros and Cons of Hitch Hiking, Part 11 (AKA "5:06 AM (Every Stranger's Eyes)")".
C. "Each Small Candle" is previously unreleased.

== Personnel ==
- Roger Waters – bass guitar, acoustic & electric guitars, lead & backing vocals
- Doyle Bramhall II – guitars, lead & backing vocals
- Andy Fairweather Low – acoustic & electric guitars, bass guitar, backing vocals
- Snowy White – electric & acoustic guitars
- Andy Wallace – keyboards, Hammond organ, backing vocals
- Jon Carin – keyboards, programming, lap steel guitar, acoustic guitar on "Dogs" and "Comfortably Numb", lead & backing vocals
- Katie Kissoon – backing vocals, percussion, co-lead vocals on "Amused to Death"
- Susannah Melvoin – backing vocals, percussion
- P. P. Arnold – backing vocals, percussion, co-lead vocals on "Perfect Sense, Pt. 1 & 2"
- Graham Broad – drums, percussion
- Norbert Stachel – saxophones

== Charts ==
Chart (2000)	Peak position
Norwegian Albums Chart	37
US Billboard 200	136

Chart (2001)	Peak position
German Albums Chart	99

Chart (2002)	Peak position
Australian Music DVDs (ARIA)	2
Dutch Albums Chart	83

Chart (2007)	Peak position
Australian Albums (ARIA)	100
New Zealand Albums Chart	24

Chart (2011)	Peak position
Portuguese Albums Chart	7

== Video Certifications ==
Region	Certification	Certified units/sales
Australia (ARIA)	2× Platinum	30,000^{^}
Brazil (Pro-Música Brasil)	Gold	25,000^{*}
Germany (BVMI)	Gold	25,000^{^}
Poland (ZPAV)	Gold	5,000^{*}
Switzerland (IFPI Switzerland)	Gold	3,000^{^}
United States (RIAA)	Gold	50,000^{^}
^{*} Sales figures based on certification alone.^{^} Shipments figures based on certification alone.
