= Hello I Love You =

Hello I Love You may refer to:

- "Hello, I Love You", a 1968 song by the Doors
- "Hello (I Love You)", a 2007 song by Roger Waters
- "Hello, I Love You", a 2014 song by Adore Delano from Till Death Do Us Party
- "Hello I Love You", a 1978 song by Crystal Gayle from When I Dream
