= What God Wants, Part I =

Single by Roger Waters

from the album Amused to Death
- B-side: "What God Wants, Part III"
- Released: 24 August 1992
- Recorded: 1992
- Genre: Progressive rock, arena-rock
- Length: 6:00
- Label: Columbia
- Songwriter(s): Roger Waters
- Producer(s): Roger Waters

Roger Waters singles chronology
"The Tide Is Turning (Live in Berlin)" (1990)	"What God Wants, Part I" (1992)	"The Bravery of Being Out of Range" (1992)

"What God Wants, Part I" is the first song in a series of songs written and released by former Pink Floyd bassist, Roger Waters on his third solo studio album, Amused to Death (1992). "What God Wants" is separated into three parts, similar to Pink Floyd's earlier "Another Brick in the Wall". "What God Wants, Part I" was released as a lead single from the album b/w Part III.

== Lyrics and music ==
"What God Wants, Part I" deals with the contradictory duality and hypocrisy perceived by Waters in dogmatic religion and its power over man. The following parts, along with other songs on the album, deal with worship in religion and in regard to materialism and consumption. All together, its viewpoint is on the power of simplistic conformity; how people adhere to something, not entirely by volition, but out of submission.

"I'm very upset by religious dogma," Waters remarked. "I get angry – gobsmacked, in fact – when I hear George Bush saying that God was on their side during the Gulf War. It's amazing that, in 1992, one of the most powerful men in the world can reduce political rhetoric to that level."

The song features the guitar playing of Jeff Beck.

== Music video ==
A music video was released, featuring gorillas watching TV, CGI and stop motion animation of a frog skeleton picking at a piece of cheese on a mouse trap, only to be subdued by electrical wiring and fused with the cheese to create a small television set. The video was directed by Tony Kaye and produced by Sarah Whistler. Animation for the video was contracted out to several studios, including Pacific Data Images (CG) and Will Vinton Studios (stop motion). Crew members for Pacific Data Images include Raman Hui, the stop motion animation artists included Chuck Duke, Scott Nordlund, Webster Colcord and Schell Hickel.

On July 21, 2015, Waters and Rolling Stone premiered a remastered version of the original video, featuring updated computer graphics and an all-new transfer of the original 35mm footage of Waters in the studio with guitarist Jeff Beck. The video is being presented exclusively through Rolling Stone by Vevo and Sony Music.

== Release ==
BBC Radio 1 refused to play the single as it considered the lyrics controversial.

== Personnel ==
- Roger Waters – vocals, EMU synthesizer, bass
- Jeff Beck – lead guitar
- Patrick Leonard – keyboards, choir arrangement
- Geoff Whitehorn – "Arpeggio" guitar
- Andy Fairweather Low – rhythm electric and acoustic guitars
- Tim Pierce – "Chorus" guitar
- Randy Jackson – bass
- Graham Broad – drums
- Katie Kissoon, Doreen Chanter, N'Dea Davenport, and Natalie Jackson – backing vocals
- London Welsh Chorale conducted by Kenneth Bowen

All credits are according to 2015 reissue liner notes.

== Chart performance ==
Chart (1992)	Peak position
Australia (ARIA)	103
Netherlands (Single Top 100)	49
New Zealand (Recorded Music NZ)	26
Norway (VG-lista)	9
UK Singles (OCC)	35
US Mainstream Rock Songs (Billboard)	4
