= Perfect Sense (song) =

Song by Roger Waters

from the album Amused to Death
- Released: 7 September 1992
- Recorded: 1987–1992
- Genre: Progressive rock
- Length: Part I: 4:16; Part II: 2:51; Both: 7:07
- Label: Columbia
- Songwriter: Roger Waters
- Producers: Roger Waters, Nick Griffiths, Patrick Leonard

"Perfect Sense, Part I" and "Perfect Sense, Part II" are the third and fourth tracks from the concept album Amused to Death by ex-Pink Floyd member Roger Waters. The songs are sung partially by Roger Waters but mainly by P. P. Arnold on both the original album and live shows.

== Overview ==
Part I of the song begins with a loud and unintelligible rant cutting out the noise of the previous track, "What God Wants, Part I". Following this is a backwards spoken message:

Julia, however, in the light and visions of the issues of Stanley, we changed our minds. We have decided to include a backward message. Stanley, for you, and for all the other book burners...

The message climaxes with Waters yelling in the aggressive Scottish voice he used to depict the character of the teacher in The Wall. This is not the first example of Roger Waters using reversed messages in his musical work. In an interview with Rockline on 8 February 1993 Roger Waters stated that he had wanted to use samples of HAL 9000 from 2001: A Space Odyssey on the album. Stanley Kubrick, the director, turned him down on the basis that it would open the door to too many other people using the sound sample. Since this incident Waters has used the audio of HAL describing his mind being taken away during the introduction of "Perfect Sense, Part I" in live performances, such as the In the Flesh tour in 2002, after Kubrick had died.

The opening lines of the song begin with a reference from the film 2001: A Space Odyssey in which "The monkey sat on a pile of stones and stared at the broken bone in his hand". This monkey – the human being – is referred to continuously throughout the album.

In Part II, famed sportscaster Marv Albert commentates a war as if it were a basketball game.

Both parts of the song were performed as part of Waters' In the Flesh tour. In 2000, a recording of this was released as the fifth track of the second disk of the live album, In the Flesh – Live. Both parts were released as one track, titled "Perfect Sense, Pt. 1 & 2", with a length of 7:26.

In the 2015 re-released and remastered edition of the album, the samples of HAL 9000 were finally included, and the backwards message omitted.

== Personnel ==
=== Amused to Death version ===
- Roger Waters - co-lead vocals, synthesizers (only part II)
- P.P. Arnold – co lead vocals
- Marv Albert – commentary (only part II)
- Patrick Leonard - keyboards, speech (only part II)
- John Dupree – arrangements
- B.J. Cole – pedal steel guitar
- Steve Lukather – guitar
- Rick DiFonso – guitar
- Bruce Gaitsch – acoustic guitar
- Jimmy Johnson – bass
- Brian Macleod – snare, hi-hat
- Graham Broad – drums
- Luis Conte – percussion

=== In the Flesh tour version ===
- Roger Waters – co-lead vocals
- P. P. Arnold – co-lead vocals
- Doyle Bramhall II – electric guitar, backing vocals (1999-2000 dates)
- Chester Kamen - electric guitar, backing vocals (2002 dates)
- Snowy White – electric guitar
- Andy Fairweather Low – bass guitar
- Jon Carin – piano, backing vocals (1999-2000 dates)
- Harry Waters - Piano (2002 dates)
- Andy Wallace – keyboards
- Katie Kissoon – backing vocals
- Susannah Melvoin – backing vocals (1999-2000 dates)
- Linda Lewis – backing vocals (first leg 2002 dates)
- Carol Kenyon – backing vocals (second leg 2002 dates)
- Graham Broad – drums, percussion

=== The Dark Side of the Moon Live version ===
- Roger Waters – co-lead vocals,
- P.P. Arnold – co-lead vocals
- Dave Kilminster – electric guitar, backing vocals
- Snowy White – electric guitar
- Andy Fairweather-Low – bass guitar (2006-07 dates)
- Chester Kamen – bass guitar (2008 dates)
- Jon Carin – piano, backing vocals
- Harry Waters – keyboards
- Carol Kenyon – backing vocals
- Katie Kissoon – backing vocals (2006-07 dates)
- Sylvia Mason-James - backing vocals (2008 dates)
- Graham Broad – drums, percussion
