= Amused to Death =

Studio album by Roger Waters
- Released: 7 September 1992
- Recorded: 1987–1992
- Studios: The Billiard Room (London); Olympic Studios (London); CTS Studios (London); Angel Recording Studios (London); Abbey Road Studios (London); Compass Point Studios (Nassau); Ameraycan Studios (Los Angeles); Johnny Yuma Recording (Burbank); Devonshire Sound Studios (Los Angeles)
- Genre: Progressive rock
- Length: 72:36
- Label: Columbia
- Producers: Patrick Leonard; Roger Waters

Roger Waters chronology
The Wall – Live in Berlin (1990)	Amused to Death (1992)	In the Flesh – Live (2000)

Roger Waters studio chronology
Radio K.A.O.S. (1987)	Amused to Death (1992)	Ça Ira (2005)

Singles from Amused to Death
- 1. "What God Wants, Part I" Released: 24 August 1992; 2. "The Bravery of Being Out of Range" Released: 30 November 1992; 3. "Three Wishes" Released: 1993

Alternative cover
- Cover of the 2015 reissue

Amused to Death is the third studio album by the English singer-songwriter Roger Waters, released on 7 September 1992 by Columbia Records. Produced by Waters and Patrick Leonard, it was mixed in QSound to enhance its spatial feel. The album features Jeff Beck on lead guitar on several tracks. The album's title was inspired by Neil Postman's 1985 book Amusing Ourselves to Death.

In 2015, the album was remixed and re-released with new artwork and in different formats, including a new 5.1 surround sound mix by original engineer James Guthrie, assisted by Joel Plante.

== Background and production ==
Roger Waters started working on Amused to Death in 1987 when he first wrote "Perfect Sense." It was several years before the album was released.

Amused to Death was produced by Waters and Patrick Leonard, with co-production by Nick Griffiths. It was recorded in London at The Billiard Room, Olympic Studios, CTS Studios, Angel Recording Studios and Abbey Road Studios. The album was engineered by Hayden Bendall, Jerry Jordan, and Stephen McLaughlan and mixed by James Guthrie. The album is mixed in QSound to enhance the spatial feel of the audio, and the many sound effects on the album – rifle range ambience, sleigh-bells, cars, planes, distant horses, chirping crickets, and dogs – all make use of the 3-D facility.

== Themes ==
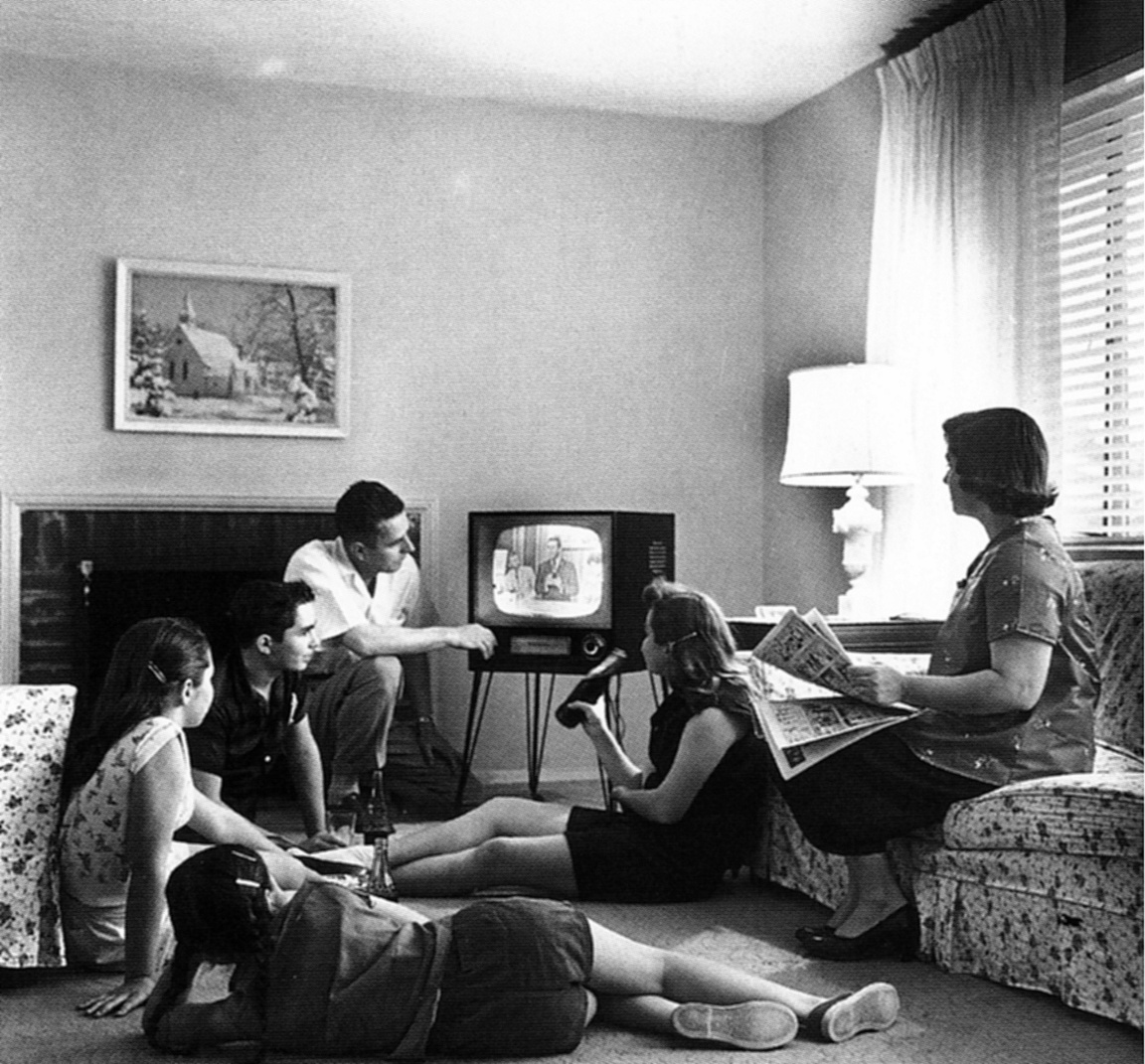
The album centers around the effects of televised mass media.

The album is loosely organized around the idea of an ape randomly switching channels on a television, but explores numerous political and social themes, including critiques of the First Gulf War in "The Bravery of Being Out of Range" and "Perfect Sense".

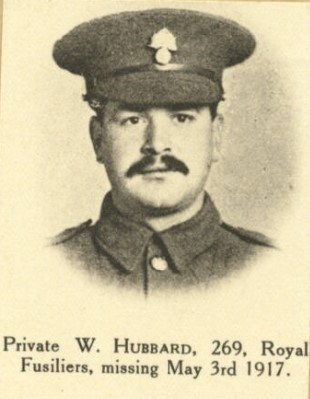
Private W. Hubbard, Royal Fusiliers

The first track, "The Ballad of Bill Hubbard", features the voice of World War I veteran Alfred Razzell. A member of the Royal Fusiliers, he describes finding fellow soldier William "Bill" Hubbard (1888-3 May 1917) – to whom the album is dedicated – severely wounded on the battlefield during the Second Battle of Arras. After failed attempts to take him to safety, Razzell is forced to abandon him in no man's land. The tale is continued at the end of the title track, at the very end of the album, providing a coda to the tragic story, with Razzell describing how he finally found peace. The excerpts are from BBC Television's 1991 Everyman documentary, "A Game of Ghosts", marking the 75th anniversary of the start of the Battle of the Somme. "I found it very moving," Waters remarked. "That original programme confronted the horrors of war and told the real story. It was an example of television taking its responsibilities seriously." The opening track also features the sound of several animals.

The second song, "What God Wants, Part I", follows and contrasts the moving words of Razzell by opening with the TV being tuned instead into an excerpt of a child who says, "I don't mind about the war. That's one of the things I like to watch – if it's a war going on. 'Cos then I know if, um, our side's winning, if our side's losing..." he is then interrupted by the channel being changed and a burst of ape-chatter.

"Perfect Sense" is a two-part song about a world where live transmissions of wars are the main form of entertainment. The first part begins with a loud, unintelligible rant, then a backwards message from Waters: "Julia, however, in the light and visions of the issues of Stanley, we changed our minds. We have decided to include a backward message. Stanley, for you, and for all the other book burners." The message climaxes with Waters yelling in the aggressive Scottish voice he used to depict the teacher in The Wall. In the second part, sportscaster Marv Albert narrates a war as if it were a basketball game. "My main inspiration behind the song 'Perfect Sense'," Waters explained, "came from thinking about the days of the Roman Empire, when they would flood the Colosseum and have fights between rival galleys. I've always been intrigued by this notion of war as an entertainment to mollify the folks back home, and the Gulf conflict fuelled that idea."

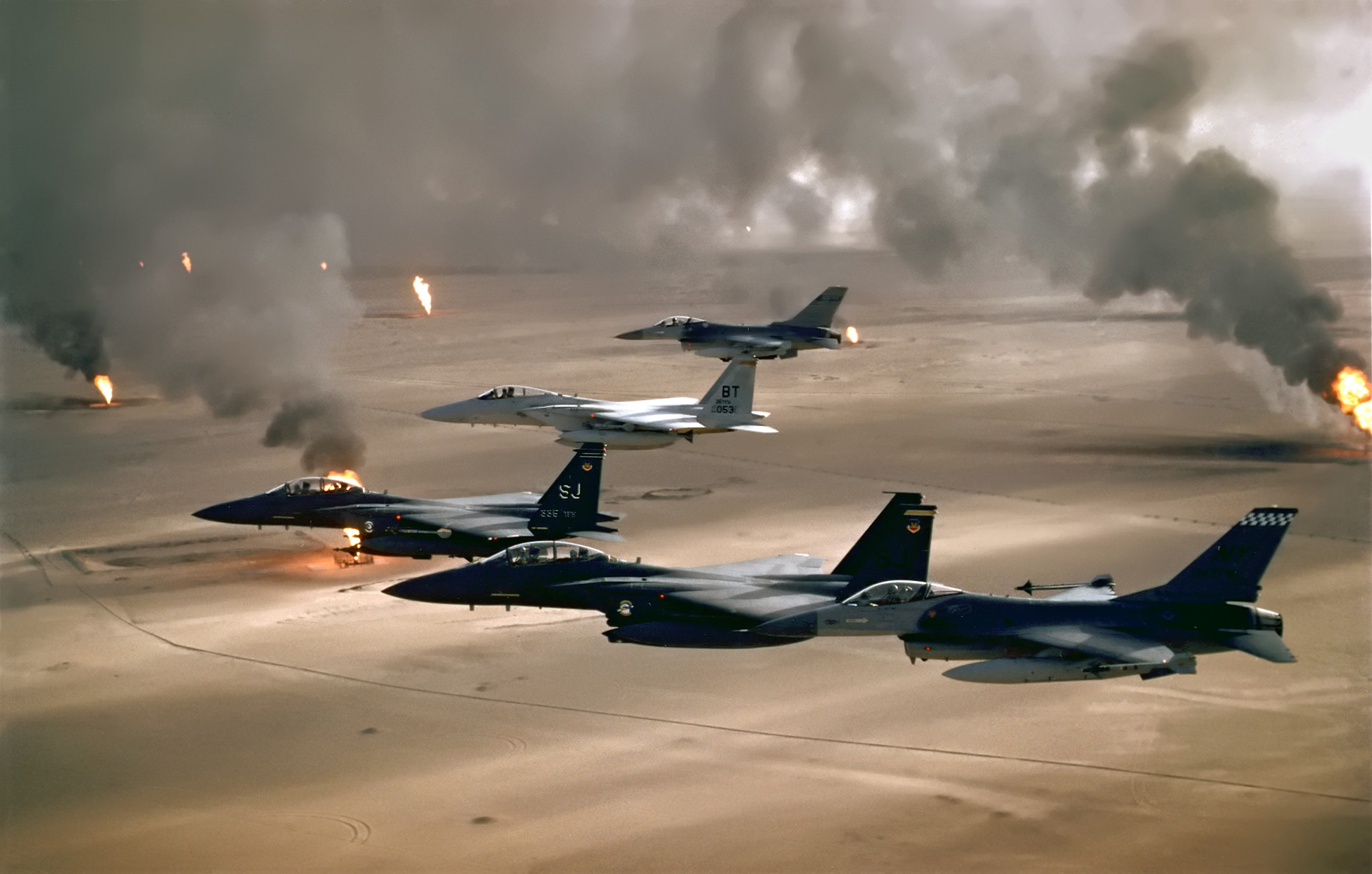
Several tracks on the album comment on and criticize the Gulf War.

"The Bravery of Being Out of Range" includes a reference to a song written by Waters on Pink Floyd's 1977 album Animals, "Sheep", and to "Swing Low, Sweet Chariot". In "Sheep" Waters sings, "I've looked over Jordan and I have seen, things are not what they seem"; in "The Bravery of Being Out of Range" he sings "I looked over Jordan and what did I see? I saw a U.S. Marine in a pile of debris."

"Late Home Tonight, Part I", which opens with the song of a Eurasian skylark, recalls the 1986 US air strike against Libya from the perspective of two "ordinary wives" and a young American F-111 pilot. The lyrics about "when you take the jeans from the refrigerator" reference a 1985 Levi's 501 commercial.

At the beginning of "What God Wants, Part II" Charles Fleischer (better known as the voice of Roger Rabbit) performs the greedy teleevangelist's sermon. The lyrics about God wanting silver, gold and "his secret never to be told" reference the nursery rhyme, One for Sorrow. "What God Wants, Part III" musically references the Pink Floyd songs "Shine On You Crazy Diamond (Part I)", "Echoes" and "Breathe (In the Air)". It ends with an audio clip of Tom Bromley, an elderly WWI veteran, singing "Wait 'Till the Sun Shines, Nellie" a capella. The clip is also from "A Game of Ghosts".

"Too Much Rope" includes the line, "Each man has his price, Bob, and yours was pretty low." "I would sometimes rehearse vocal takes by impersonating Bob Dylan," Waters explained. "That line originally read, 'Each man has his price, my friends…' – so make of that what you will. As a joke, I sang 'Bob' instead, and Pat (Leonard, producer) insisted that we leave it in. So, although it was unintentional, I'm happy that it's there for (Pink Floyd producer) Bob Ezrin. I hope he appreciates it."

The song "Watching TV" (a duet with Don Henley) explores the influence of mass media on the Chinese protests for democracy in Tiananmen Square.

In "It's a Miracle" Waters makes a scathing reference to Andrew Lloyd Webber (whom he would accuse elsewhere of having plagiarised music from Pink Floyd's "Echoes" for sections of the musical The Phantom of the Opera): The same song features a sample from the 1977 low-budget zombie film Shock Waves in which the film's characters wrestle over a flashlight. The title track begins with the lyric, "Doctor, Doctor". "Take Up Thy Stethoscope and Walk" on The Piper at the Gates of Dawn, the first song written by Waters, opens with the same line.

=== HAL samples ===
Waters stated in a Rockline interview on February 8, 1993, that he had wanted to use dialogue samples from 2001: A Space Odyssey on the album, specifically HAL 9000's 'dying' monologue. Stanley Kubrick, the film's director, turned him down on the basis that it would open the door to many other people using the sound sample. Others think that Kubrick refused because Pink Floyd had not allowed him to use music from Atom Heart Mother in his film A Clockwork Orange. Waters did use the samples of HAL describing his mind being taken away when performing live – specifically at the beginning of "Perfect Sense, Part I" during his In the Flesh tour, after Kubrick's death, and it was finally incorporated into the Amused to Death album for the 2015 remaster / remix release.

== Title ==
The album's title was inspired by Neil Postman's book Amusing Ourselves to Death. In Postman's later book The End of Education, he remarks on the album:

Roger Waters, once the lead singer of Pink Floyd, was sufficiently inspired by a book of mine to produce a CD called Amused to Death. This fact so elevated my prestige among undergraduates that I am hardly in a position to repudiate him or his kind of music. Nor do I have the inclination for any other reason. Nonetheless, the level of sensibility required to appreciate the music of Roger Waters is both different and lower than what is required to appreciate, let us say, a Chopin étude.

== Packaging ==
The album's original artwork features a chimpanzee watching television in reference to Kubrick's film 2001: A Space Odyssey. The image on the television is a gigantic eyeball staring at the viewer. According to Waters, the ape was "a symbol for anyone who's been sitting with his mouth open in front of the network and cable news for the last 10 years."

== Reception ==
Professional ratings
Review scores
Source	Rating
AllMusic	4.5/5 stars
Chicago Tribune	1.5/4 stars
Drowned in Sound	8/10
Entertainment Weekly	A–
Los Angeles Times	2.5/4 stars
Paste	8.0/10
PopMatters	8/10
Record Collector	4/5 stars
The Rolling Stone Album Guide	3/5 stars
Spectrum Culture	3.5/5 stars

AllMusic described the album as "a masterpiece in the sense that it brings together all of his obsessions in one grand, but not unwieldy, package". Record Collector wrote that the album shows Waters "at his most bleakly inspired since the cautionary parable of The Wall". However, the Los Angeles Times was less favorable, writing "The result is blurred structure (partly improved by the moving old-soldier's tale Waters uses as a framing device), too much repetition and a certain distance and overintellectualization. [...] overall there's a dearth of the good old pop-rock appeal that always lifted the better Pink Floyd records." A negative review came from Chicago Tribune, writing "self-importance doesn't equal profundity, and the world's most mind-blowing engineering couldn't cover up the deterioration of Waters' singing and melodic sense since his days with Floyd." Ultimate Classic Rock included Amused to Death on their list "Top 100 90's Rock Albums".

== Legacy ==
Waters told Classic Rock: "My view is that I've been involved in two absolutely classic albums – The Dark Side of the Moon and The Wall [...] And if you haven't got Amused to Death, you haven't got the full set. So this album [In the Flesh – Live] – the live one, which pulls together songs from all three albums – hopefully redresses the balance." On 19 September 2013, Waters told BBC HardTalk that Amused to Death has been completely underrated.

On 15 April 2015, Waters announced that the album would be remastered and reissued on 24 July 2015 featuring a new 5.1 multichannel audio mix, as well as a new stereo mix. It was made available in a number of formats, including CD, SACD, Blu-ray and high-resolution downloads. In a review of the 2015 remastering of the album, journalist J.C. Maçek III of Spectrum Culture wrote that "Not every album can be a masterpiece, but Waters has stated that Amused to Death is an underrated effort that serves as a third part to Dark Side of the Moon and The Wall. But it's nowhere near those other albums. The 2015 remastering makes it a good sounding album, but it's just not the kind of infinitely listenable album that Waters is capable of creating." In its review of the 2015 reissue, PopMatters wrote: "not only has Amused to Death aged well musically, it has unfortunately aged well thematically too. [...] Amused to Death was and still is a powerful statement from one of rock music's most literate misanthropes. As time goes on, it gets harder and harder to believe that it slipped under everyone's radar so thoroughly." Drowned in Sound wrote: "Amused to Death stands up on its own as one of the better, more intriguing post-Floyd records".

In 2016 Amused to Death won the Grammy Award for Best Surround Sound Album at the 58th Annual Grammy Awards. The winners were listed as follows: "James Guthrie, surround mix engineer; James Guthrie & Joel Plante, surround mastering engineers; James Guthrie, surround producer (Roger Waters) Label: Columbia/Legacy"

== Commercial performance ==
Amused to Death reached No. 8 on the UK Albums Chart, Waters' first Top 10 as a solo artist in his homeland, and a career high of No. 21 on the Billboard 200, aided by "What God Wants, Part I", which hit No. 4 on Billboard's Mainstream Rock Tracks chart in 1992. It was also certified Gold by the British Phonographic Industry for selling over 100,000 units, which became his first and only studio album to be certified Gold in his home country.

== Track listing ==
All songs written by Roger Waters.

No.	Title	Length
1.	"The Ballad of Bill Hubbard"	4:21
2.	"What God Wants, Part I"	6:00
3.	"Perfect Sense, Part I"	4:15
4.	"Perfect Sense, Part II"	2:51
5.	"The Bravery of Being Out of Range"	4:45
6.	"Late Home Tonight, Part I"	4:01
7.	"Late Home Tonight, Part II"	2:13
8.	"Too Much Rope"	5:47
9.	"What God Wants, Part II"	3:40
10.	"What God Wants, Part III"	4:09
11.	"Watching TV"	6:06
12.	"Three Wishes"	6:52
13.	"It's a Miracle"	8:30
14.	"Amused to Death"	9:07
Total length:		72:36

== Personnel ==
- Roger Waters – vocals (tracks 2–14), bass guitar (2 intro, 13), EMU synthesiser (2, 4), acoustic guitar (11, 14), twelve-string guitar (5)
- Patrick Leonard – keyboards (1–5, 8–14), percussion programming (1), choir arrangement (2, 9–11, 13), 2nd sportscaster voice (4), Hammond organ (5, not on 2015 reissue), synthesisers (5, 13), acoustic piano (11, 13)
- Jeff Beck – guitar (1, 11, 13) solo guitar (2, 5 (2015 reissue only), 10, 12, 14)
- Andy Fairweather Low – electric rhythm guitar (2, 9, 12) acoustic rhythm guitar (2, 9), guitars (6, 7), Rickenbacker 12-string guitar (8, 12), acoustic guitar (11)
- Tim Pierce – guitar (2, 5, 9, 12)
- Geoff Whitehorn – guitar (2, 8, 10, 14)
- B.J. Cole – pedal steel guitar (3, 4)
- Rick DiFonzo – guitar (3, 4)
- Steve Lukather – guitar (3, 4, 8)
- Bruce Gaitsch – acoustic guitar (3, 4)
- David Paich – Hammond organ (5, 2015 reissue only)
- John "Rabbit" Bundrick – Hammond organ (12)
- Steve Sidwell – cornet (6, 7)
- Randy Jackson – bass (2, 9)
- Jimmy Johnson – bass (3–4, 6–8, 10, 12–14)
- John Pierce – bass guitar (5)
- John Patitucci – upright bass, electric bass (11)
- Guo Yi & the Peking Brothers – dulcimer, lute, zhen, oboe, bass (11)
- Graham Broad – drums (2–4, 6–10, 12, 14), percussion (6, 7)
- Denny Fongheiser – drums (5)
- Jeff Porcaro – drums (13)
- Brian Macleod – snare (3, 4), hi-hat (3, 4)
- Luis Conte – percussion (1, 3–4, 6–8, 10, 12)
- John Dupree – strings arranger and conductor (3, 4)
- National Philharmonic Orchestra Limited – orchestra (7, 8)
- Michael Kamen – orchestral arranger and conductor (7, 8)
- Alf Razzell – speech (1, 14)
- London Welsh Chorale – choir (2, 10, 11, 13)
- Kenneth Bowen – choir conductor (2, 10, 11, 13)
- Katie Kissoon – backing vocals (2, 8, 9, 12, 14)
- Doreen Chanter – backing vocals (2, 8, 9, 12, 14)
- N'Dea Davenport – backing vocals (2)
- Natalie Jackson – backing vocals (2, 5)
- P.P. Arnold – vocals (3, 4)
- Marv Albert – sportscaster voice (4)
- Lynn Fiddmont-Linsey – backing vocals (5)
- Jessica Leonard, Jordan Leonard – screaming kids (8)
- Charles Fleischer – TV evangelist speech (9)
- Don Henley – vocals (11)
- Jon Joyce – backing vocals (13)
- Stan Farber (credited as Stan Laurel) – backing vocals (13)
- Jim Haas – backing vocals (13)
- Rita Coolidge – vocals (14)

Production

- Roger Waters – production
- Patrick Leonard – production
- Nick Griffiths – co-producer
- Hayden Bendall – engineering
- Jerry Jordan – engineering
- Stephen McLaughlin – engineering
- James Guthrie – mixing

== Charts ==
Original release

Chart (1992)	Position
Australian Albums (ARIA)	14
New Zealand Albums (RMNZ)	6
Norwegian Albums (VG-lista)	2
Swedish Albums (Sverigetopplistan)	10
UK Albums Chart	8
US Billboard 200	21

2015 reissue

Chart (2015)	Position
Austrian Albums (Ö3 Austria)	25
Belgian Albums (Ultratop Flanders)	32
Belgian Albums (Ultratop Wallonia)	35
Danish Albums (Hitlisten)	18
Dutch Albums Chart	1
French Albums (SNEP)	59
German Albums Chart	4
Irish Albums (IRMA)	33
Italian Albums (FIMI)	22
UK Albums Chart	10

== Certifications ==
Region	Certification	Certified units/sales
Australia (ARIA)	Gold	35,000^{^}
Canada (Music Canada)	Gold	50,000^{^}
United Kingdom (BPI)	Gold	100,000^{‡}
^{^} Shipments figures based on certification alone.^{‡} Sales+streaming figures based on certification alone.

== Sources ==
- Rose, Phil (2015). Roger Waters and Pink Floyd: The Concept Albums. Rowman & Littlefield. ISBN 9781611477610.
- White, Timothy (1 August 1992). "Roger Waters' 'Death' & Rebirth". Billboard. Vol. 104, no. 31. Nielsen Business Media, Inc. ISSN 0006-2510.
