= Lloyd Ryan =

British jazz drummer

- Born: London, United Kingdom
- Genres: Various
- Instrument: Drums
- Years active: 1960–present
- Website: www.lloydryan.co.uk

Lloyd Ryan is an English drummer and educator. He has been described as "a specialist in the big band style of drumming". He was also a support act to Buddy Rich at the Lewisham Jazz Festival in 1986.

== Career ==
Ryan is best known for his work as a session musician and for having taught Phil Collins, one of the world's most famous drummers and best-selling music artists. Collins has credited Ryan with teaching him the basic drum rudiments.

Active since the 1960s, he has worked with Tony Christie, Matt Monro, Brotherhood of Man, the New Seekers, Tommy Cooper, Bobby Davro, Gene Vincent and P.J. Proby. Ryan has also led his own big band since the 1980s and released his first big band album in 2012.

In addition to Collins, other students who have become successful professional drummers include John Coghlan, Keef Hartley, Derrick McKenzie of Jamiroquai, Nick Simms of Cornershop, Graham Broad, Blaine Harrison of Mystery Jets, and Ralph Salmins.

In British professional wrestling, Ryan is also well known as having been the manager and spokesman of masked heel Kendo Nagasaki. He appeared in this capacity intermittently for All Star Wrestling and LDN Wrestling from 1990 (when he replaced the recently deceased "Gorgeous" George Gillette) until 2007 when he and Nagasaki (kayfabe) fell out.
