= In the Flesh (Roger Waters tour) =

Series of concert tours by Roger Waters

- Tour by Roger Waters
- Promotional poster for the tour
- Location: Africa; Asia; Australia; Europe; North America; South America
- Start date: 23 July 1999
- End date: 30 June 2002
- Legs: 4
- No. of shows: 105

Roger Waters concert chronology
- The Wall – Live in Berlin (1990); In the Flesh (1999–2002); The Dark Side of the Moon Live (2006–08)

In the Flesh was a series of worldwide concert tours by Roger Waters that spanned three individual tours over the course of three years (1999, 2000, and 2002). Returning from a 12-year-long hiatus from the road, In The Flesh was a showcase of his best known work from his days with Pink Floyd, with that material dominating shows. Songs were also performed from Waters' most recently released solo album, 1992's Amused to Death, being played live for the first time. The tour's name is an allusion to the 1977 Pink Floyd tour for the Animals album, as well as the two songs so titled on the album The Wall.

The tour was a financial success in the United States. Because of Waters' long absence from the music scene, promoters and other industry figures were unsure of how well a Waters tour would do commercially, and were surprised when tickets began selling rapidly as soon as they were put on sale. In a number of cases, dates booked in smaller venues such as theatres were moved into larger ones such as outdoor amphitheatres or arenas. The 1999 portion of the tour ended up grossing $6.7 million from 21 shows, with a total of some 243,000 people attending.

Although Waters himself had no new music being released in conjunction with In the Flesh, the 2000 portion of the tour coincided with the release of Is There Anybody Out There? The Wall Live 1980–81, commemorating Pink Floyd's historic live performance of The Wall, and the tour and the release were cross-promoted. While the first two years of the tour took place only in North America, the third year stretched across the world. During the tour, Waters played two completely new songs, "Flickering Flame" or "Each Small Candle", often as the final encore to many of the shows. In June 2002, he completed the tour with a performance in front of 70,000 people at the Glastonbury Festival of Performing Arts.

The 27 June 2000 performance at the Rose Garden Arena (Now Moda Center) in Portland, Oregon was later released as the primary source for the CD and DVD In the Flesh – Live. Several other shows were filmed as well for use in the CD/DVD, with announcements being made alerting audience members that they were being filmed.

== 1999 ==
The concert show consisted of his most famous tracks from the beginning of his Pink Floyd career, as well as selected tracks from his solo career, notably, the tour marked the first full length shows to feature material from his 1992 "Amused to Death" album. Along with the popular acclaim, the show received critical praise from various artists and magazines. Most of the tour band had worked with Waters before, although guitarist Doyle Bramhall II was new.

Personnel

- Roger Waters – guitar, bass guitar, vocals
- Andy Fairweather Low – guitar, bass guitar, vocals (has toured and recorded with George Harrison, The Who, Who member Pete Townshend, and Eric Clapton).
- Snowy White – guitars (former member of Thin Lizzy, played with Pink Floyd in 1977 and 1980).
- Doyle Bramhall II – vocals, guitar (worked with Eric Clapton)
- Graham Broad – drums, percussion (part of former Rolling Stones member Bill Wyman's band The Rhythm Kings).
- Jon Carin – keyboards, lap steel guitar, vocals, acoustic guitar on "Dogs" (toured with post-Waters Pink Floyd, Roxy Music front man Bryan Ferry, and The Who).
- Andy Wallace – keyboards, backing vocals (has performed and recorded with several artists including Hamish Stuart, David Bowie, Daryl Hall, Tom Jones and Whitney Houston.)
- P. P. Arnold – backing vocals, percussion (former backing band member for Ike and Tina Turner.)
- Katie Kissoon – backing vocals, percussion (backed the likes of Elton John, Eric Clapton, Van Morrison, and many others).

Set list

Set 1

1. "In the Flesh"
2. "The Thin Ice"
3. "Another Brick in the Wall, Part 1"
4. "The Happiest Days of Our Lives"
5. "Another Brick in the Wall, Part 2" (Prior to 31 July 1999, "Happiest Days" and "Another Brick, Part 2" were played at the end of set two after "Amused to Death")
6. "Mother"
7. "Get Your Filthy Hands Off My Desert"
8. "Southampton Dock"
9. "Pigs on the Wing, Part 1"
10. "Dogs"
11. "Welcome to the Machine"
12. "Wish You Were Here"
13. "Shine On You Crazy Diamond (Parts I–II, IV, VI–VIII)"

Set 2

1. "Speak to Me"
2. "Breathe"
3. "Time"
4. "The Great Gig in the Sky" (piano intro only, dropped prior to 15 August 1999)
5. "Money"
6. "5:06AM (Every Stranger's Eyes)"
7. "The Powers That Be"
8. "What God Wants, Part I"
9. "Perfect Sense, Part I"
10. "Perfect Sense, Part II"
11. "It's a Miracle"
12. "Amused to Death"

Encore

1. "Brain Damage"
2. "Eclipse"
3. "Comfortably Numb"

1999 tour dates
Date	City	Country	Venue
North America
23 July 1999	Milwaukee	United States	Milwaukee Auditorium
24 July 1999	Rosemont	United States	Rosemont Theatre
25 July 1999	Clarkston	United States	Pine Knob Music Theatre
27 July 1999	Cleveland	United States	Gund Arena
30 July 1999	Quebec City	Canada	L'Agora
31 July 1999	Montreal	Canada	Molson Centre
1 August 1999	Toronto	Canada	Molson Amphitheatre
4 August 1999	Mansfield	United States	Tweeter Center
6 August 1999	Holmdel	United States	PNC Bank Arts Center
7 August 1999	Wantagh	United States	Jones Beach
8 August 1999	Wallingford	United States	Oakdale Theatre
10 August 1999	Albany	United States	Pepsi Arena
11 August 1999	Camden	United States	E-Centre
13 August 1999	Scranton	United States	Montage Mountain
14 August 1999	Corfu	United States	Darien Lake Performing Arts Center
15 August 1999	Columbus	United States	Schottenstein Center
17 August 1999	Hershey	United States	Star Pavilion
18 August 1999	Burgettstown	United States	Star Lake Amphitheatre
20 August 1999	Baltimore	United States	Baltimore Arena
22 August 1999	Atlanta	United States	Lakewood Amphitheatre
24 August 1999	Noblesville	United States	Deer Creek Music Center
25 August 1999	Grand Rapids	United States	Van Andel Arena
27 August 1999	St. Louis	United States	Riverport
28 August 1999 (Note: New song "Each Small Candle" performed for the first time)	Kansas City	United States	Kemper Arena

== 2000 ==
Following the startling success of the 1999 tour, Waters mounted an even more extensive tour, touching areas of the country ignored on previous tours. The set list was also altered with "The Thin Ice", "Another Brick in the Wall, Part 1", "The Powers That Be" and "What God Wants, Part 1" being removed in favour of "Set the Controls for the Heart of the Sun", "The Bravery of Being Out of Range" and new song titled "Each Small Candle". The backing band was relatively the same as the previous tour, with an addition of a backup singer and a new saxophone player for the songs "Set the Controls for the Heart of the Sun" and "Money".

Personnel

- Roger Waters – guitar, bass guitar, vocals
- Andy Fairweather Low – guitar, bass guitar, vocals (has toured and recorded with George Harrison, The Who, Who member Pete Townshend, and Eric Clapton).
- Snowy White – guitars (former member of Thin Lizzy, played with Pink Floyd in 1977 and 1980).
- Doyle Bramhall II – vocals, guitar (worked with Eric Clapton)
- Graham Broad – drums, percussion (part of former Rolling Stones member Bill Wyman's band The Rhythm Kings).
- Jon Carin – keyboards, lap steel guitar, vocals, acoustic guitar on "Dogs" (toured with post-Waters Pink Floyd, Roxy Music front man Bryan Ferry, and The Who).
- Andy Wallace – keyboards, backing vocals (has performed and recorded with several artists including Hamish Stuart, David Bowie, Daryl Hall, Tom Jones and Whitney Houston.)
- P. P. Arnold – backing vocals, percussion (former backing band member for Ike and Tina Turner.)
- Katie Kissoon – backing vocals, percussion (backed the likes of Elton John, Eric Clapton, Van Morrison, and many others).
- Susannah Melvoin - backing vocals, percussion (has toured with Prince)

Guest musicians

- Mike MacArthur: saxophone on 2 June
- Ed Calle: saxophone on 3 June
- Wayne Jackson: trumpet on 6 June
- Andrew Love: saxophone on 6 June
- Tim Gordon: saxophone on 7 June
- Shelley Carroll: saxophone on the 10-11–13 June
- Don Menza: saxophone on the 16-17–19 June
- Steve Tavaglione: saxophone on the 21-22–24 June
- Norbert Stachel: saxophone for 25 & 27 June Rose Garden, Portland show (as documented on the In the Flesh – Live DVD)
- Eric Walton: saxophone on 30 June & 1 July
- Mark Harris: saxophone on 3 July
- Steve Eisen: saxophone on 6 July
- Mel Collins: saxophone for the last 6 dates* (toured with Waters on The Pros and Cons of Hitch Hiking and Radio Kaos tours)

Set list

Set 1

1. "In the Flesh"
2. "The Happiest Days of Our Lives"
3. "Another Brick in the Wall, Part 2"
4. "Mother"
5. "Get Your Filthy Hand Off My Desert"
6. "Southampton Dock"
7. "Pigs on the Wing, Part 1"
8. "Dogs"
9. "Welcome to the Machine"
10. "Wish You Were Here"
11. "Shine On You Crazy Diamond, Parts I–II, IV, VI–VII"

Set 2

1. "Set the Controls for the Heart of the Sun"
2. "Breathe"
3. "Time"
4. "Money"
5. "5:06AM (Every Strangers Eyes)"
6. "What God Wants, Part I" (dropped after 2 June 2000)
7. "Perfect Sense, Part I"
8. "Perfect Sense, Part II"
9. "The Bravery of Being Out of Range"
10. "It's a Miracle"
11. "Amused to Death"
12. "Brain Damage"
13. "Eclipse"

Encore

1. "Comfortably Numb"
2. "Each Small Candle"

2000 tour dates
Date	City	Country	Venue
North America
2 June 2000	Tampa	United States	Ice Palace
3 June 2000	West Palm Beach	United States	Mars Music Amphitheatre
6 June 2000	Nashville	United States	AmSouth Amphitheatre
7 June 2000	Charlotte	United States	Blockbuster Pavilion
10 June 2000	The Woodlands	United States	Cynthia Woods Mitchell Pavilion
11 June 2000	Dallas	United States	Starplex Amphitheatre
13 June 2000	San Antonio	United States	Alamodome
16 June 2000	Phoenix	United States	America West Arena
17 June 2000	Las Vegas	United States	MGM Grand Garden Arena
19 June 2000	Chula Vista	United States	Coors Amphitheatre
21 June 2000	Los Angeles	United States	Universal Amphitheatre
22 June 2000	Los Angeles	United States	Universal Amphitheatre
24 June 2000	Irvine	United States	Irvine Meadows Amphitheatre
25 June 2000	Mountain View	United States	Shoreline Amphitheatre
27 June 2000	Portland	United States	Rose Garden Arena
30 June 2000	George	United States	The Gorge Amphitheatre
1 July 2000	Boise	United States	Idaho Center
3 July 2000	Greenwood Village	United States	Fiddler's Green Amphitheatre
6 July 2000	Minneapolis	United States	Target Center
8 July 2000	Tinley Park	United States	World Music Theater
9 July 2000	Cincinnati	United States	Riverbend Music Center
11 July 2000	New York City	United States	Madison Square Garden
13 July 2000	New York City	United States	Madison Square Garden
15 July 2000	Bristow	United States	Nissan Pavilion
16 July 2000	Providence	United States	Providence Civic Center

Notes

- The Rose Garden show in Portland, Oregon was both filmed and recorded and subsequently released as a DVD and double CD titled In the Flesh – Live.

== 2002 ==
The success of Waters' two American tours encouraged him to make his 2002 tour a world tour. The set list for 2002 was similar to the previous tour with the addition of another new song, "Flickering Flame", which was substituted periodically for "Each Small Candle" as the encore. The band also changed with the departure of Doyle Bramhall II, his wife and back up singer Sussanah Melvoin and Jon Carin. Brought in was Chester Kamen who replacing Bramhall on guitars and vocals as well as Carin's vocals, Linda Lewis as back up singer (who later was replaced by Carol Kenyon due to personal issues), and Harry Waters (son of frontman Roger Waters) to replace Carin on keyboards and occasional guitar. By far the most historical moment of this or any of Waters in the Flesh tours came at London's Wembley Arena as former Pink Floyd bandmate and drummer Nick Mason sat in and played both nights on "Set the Controls for the Heart of the Sun".

Personnel

- Roger Waters – guitar, bass guitar, vocals
- Andy Fairweather Low – guitar, bass guitar, vocals (has toured and recorded with George Harrison, The Who, Who member Pete Townshend, and Eric Clapton).
- Snowy White – guitars (former member of Thin Lizzy, played with Pink Floyd in 1977 and 1980).
- Chester Kamen – vocals, guitar (Played with David Gilmour and Bryan Ferry at Live Aid)
- Graham Broad – drums, percussion (part of former Rolling Stones member Bill Wyman's band The Rhythm Kings).
- Harry Waters – keyboards, acoustic guitar on "Comfortably Numb" (Waters' Son and Jazz Hammond organist and pianist
- Andy Wallace – keyboards, backing vocals (has performed and recorded with several artists including Hamish Stuart, David Bowie, Daryl Hall, Tom Jones and Whitney Houston.)
- P. P. Arnold – backing vocals, percussion (former backing band member for Ike and Tina Turner.)
- Katie Kissoon – backing vocals, percussion (backed the likes of Elton John, Eric Clapton, Van Morrison, and many others).
- Linda Lewis – (first leg) backing vocals, percussion (provided vocals for David Bowie, Al Kooper, Cat Stevens, Steve Harley and Cockney Rebel, Rick Wakeman & Rod Stewart)
- Carol Kenyon – (second leg) backing vocals, percussion (sung with Go West, Duran Duran, Kylie Minogue, Mike Oldfield, Jon and Vangelis and The Pet Shop Boys as well as post Waters' Pink Floyd)
- Norbert Stachel: saxophone, penny whistle

Set list

Set 1

1. "In The Flesh"
2. "The Happiest Days of Our Lives"
3. "Another Brick in the Wall, Part 2"
4. "Mother"
5. "Get Your Filthy Hand Off My Desert"
6. "Southampton Dock"
7. "Pigs on the Wing, Part 1"
8. "Dogs"
9. "Set the Controls for the Heart of the Sun" (moved midtour, originally opened set two)
10. "Shine On You Crazy Diamond, Parts I–V"
11. "Welcome to the Machine"
12. "Wish You Were Here"
13. "Shine On You Crazy Diamond, Parts VI–VII" (On 7 June and 24 June 2002 the full "Shine On You Crazy Diamond, Parts VI–IX" was played instead)

Set 2

1. "Breathe"
2. "Time"
3. "Money"
4. "5:06AM (Every Strangers Eyes)"
5. "Perfect Sense, Part I"
6. "Perfect Sense, Part II"
7. "The Bravery of Being Out of Range"
8. "It's a Miracle"
9. "Amused to Death"
10. "Brain Damage"
11. "Eclipse"

Encore

1. "Comfortably Numb"
2. "Each Small Candle" or "Flickering Flame" (On certain dates, such as 17 March 2002, among others, both "Each Small Candle" and "Flickering Flame" were performed)

2002 tour dates
Date	City	Country	Venue
Africa/South America/North America/Asia/Australia
27 February 2002	Cape Town	South Africa	Bellville Velodrome
1 March 2002	Johannesburg	South Africa	MTN Sundome **
3 March 2002	Santiago	Chile	Estadio Nacional **
7 March 2002	Buenos Aires	Argentina	Velez Sarsfield Stadium **
9 March 2002	Rio de Janeiro	Brazil	Sambódromo Carnival **
12 March 2002	Porto Alegre	Brazil	Olímpico Stadium
14 March 2002	São Paulo	Brazil	Estádio do Pacaembu **
15 March 2002	São Paulo	Brazil	Estádio do Pacaembu **
17 March 2002	Caracas	Venezuela	Caracas POP Festival **
19 March 2002	Mexico City	Mexico	Foro Sol
25 March 2002	Osaka	Japan	Koseinenkin Hall
26 March 2002	Osaka	Japan	Koseinenkin Hall
28 March 2002	Tokyo	Japan	Tokyo International Forum **
30 March 2002	Tokyo	Japan	Tokyo International Forum **
31 March 2002	Tokyo	Japan	Tokyo International Forum **
2 April 2002	Seoul	South Korea	Jamsil Olympic Stadium
5 April 2002	Sydney	Australia	Sydney Entertainment Centre
6 April 2002	Sydney	Australia	Sydney Entertainment Centre
8 April 2002	Melbourne	Australia	Rod Laver Arena
10 April 2002	Bangkok	Thailand	Impact Arena
13 April 2002	Bangalore	India	Palace Grounds
15 April 2002	Dubai	United Arab Emirates	Golf & Yacht Club
17 April 2002	Beirut	Lebanon	B.I.E.L.
Europe
4 May 2002	Lisbon	Portugal	Atlantic Pavilion **
5 May 2002	Lisbon	Portugal	Atlantic Pavilion **
8 May 2002	Barcelona	Spain	Palau Sant Jordi
10 May 2002	Milan	Italy	Forum
11 May 2002	Zürich	Switzerland	Hallenstadion
13 May 2002	Antwerp	Belgium	Sportpaleis
15 May 2002	Rotterdam	Netherlands	Rotterdam Ahoy
17 May 2002	Erfurt	Germany	Messe Halle
18 May 2002	Cologne	Germany	Kölnarena
20 May 2002	Oberhausen	Germany	Arena
22 May 2002	Hanover	Germany	Preussag Arena
24 May 2002	Oslo	Norway	Oslo Spektrum
25 May 2002	Stockholm	Sweden	Globe Arena
27 May 2002	Saint Petersburg	Russia	New Arena/Hermitage
29 May 2002	Moscow	Russia	Olimpiski Arena
31 May 2002	Helsinki	Finland	Hartwall Areena
2 June 2002	Copenhagen	Denmark	Forum
4 June 2002	Munich	Germany	Olympiahalle
5 June 2002	Frankfurt	Germany	Festhalle Frankfurt
7 June 2002	Warsaw	Poland	Gwardia Stadium
9 June 2002	Berlin	Germany	Velodrome
10 June 2002	Prague	Czech Republic	Paegas Arena
12 June 2002	Rome	Italy	Stadio Flaminio
14 June 2002	Wien	Austria	Wiesen Festival
15 June 2002	Budapest	Hungary	Kisstadion **
17 June 2002	Stuttgart	Germany	Schleyerhalle
19 June 2002	Paris	France	Palais Omnisports de Paris-Bercy
21 June 2002	Birmingham	England	National Exhibition Centre
22 June 2002	Manchester	England	MEN Arena
24 June 2002	Dublin	Ireland	Point Theatre
26 June 2002	London	England	Wembley Arena *
27 June 2002	London	England	Wembley Arena *
30 June 2002	Pilton	England	Glastonbury Festival

- * Nick Mason's guest-drumming appearances during "Set the Controls for the Heart of the Sun".
- ** Indicates when "Each Small Candle" was substituted for "Flickering Flame" during the encore
