= Each Small Candle =

2000 song performed by Roger Waters

Song by Roger Waters

from the album In the Flesh – Live
- Released: 2000
- Genre: Progressive rock
- Songwriter(s): Roger Waters

"Each Small Candle" is a song by Roger Waters. The song was premiered as part of In the Flesh tour and subsequently released on the live album In the Flesh – Live in 2000. No studio version of the song has been released.

During the In the Flesh tour "Each Small Candle" was included in the encore of all the concerts of the 2000, and some of the concerts of the 2002 tour (alternating with "Flickering Flame", another new song).

Most of the lyrics were inspired by a news story from the Kosovo war of a Serbian soldier who saw a wounded Albanian woman, left his ranks and helped her.
