= Hello (I Love You) =

Single by Roger Waters

from the album Soundtrack of The Last Mimzy
- A-side: "Hello (I Love You)" (radio edit)
- B-side: "Hello (I Love You)" (album version)
- Released: 12 March 2007
- Genre: Progressive rock
- Length: 6:16
- Label: Silva Screen Records
- Songwriter(s): Roger Waters, Howard Shore
- Producer(s): Roger Waters, James Guthrie

Roger Waters singles chronology
"To Kill the Child / Leaving Beirut" (2004)	"Hello (I Love You)" (2007)	"We Shall Overcome" (2010)

"Hello (I Love You)" is a song performed by former Pink Floyd member Roger Waters. The song was created as a collaborative effort with Howard Shore for the 2007 film The Last Mimzy.

== Overview ==
As Waters stated, "I think together we've come up with a song that captures the themes of the movie – the clash between humanity's best and worst instincts, and how a child's innocence can win the day".

Waters performed vocals and the bass for the song. The song itself contains references to the Pink Floyd albums The Wall and The Dark Side of the Moon, as well as Waters' solo album Radio K.A.O.S..

=== Music video ===
The song's music video features images from the film as well as recording sessions with Waters, Shore, producer James Guthrie and actress Rhiannon Leigh Wryn.
