= Tweeter Center =

Tweeter Center can refer to any of the following amphitheatres:

- Tweeter Center at the Waterfront, now Freedom Mortgage Pavilion, in Camden, New Jersey, near Philadelphia
- Tweeter Center Chicago, now Credit Union 1 Amphitheatre, in Tinley Park, Illinois, near Chicago
- Tweeter Center for the Performing Arts, now Xfinity Center, in Mansfield, Massachusetts, near Boston
