= Graham Broad =

English drummer

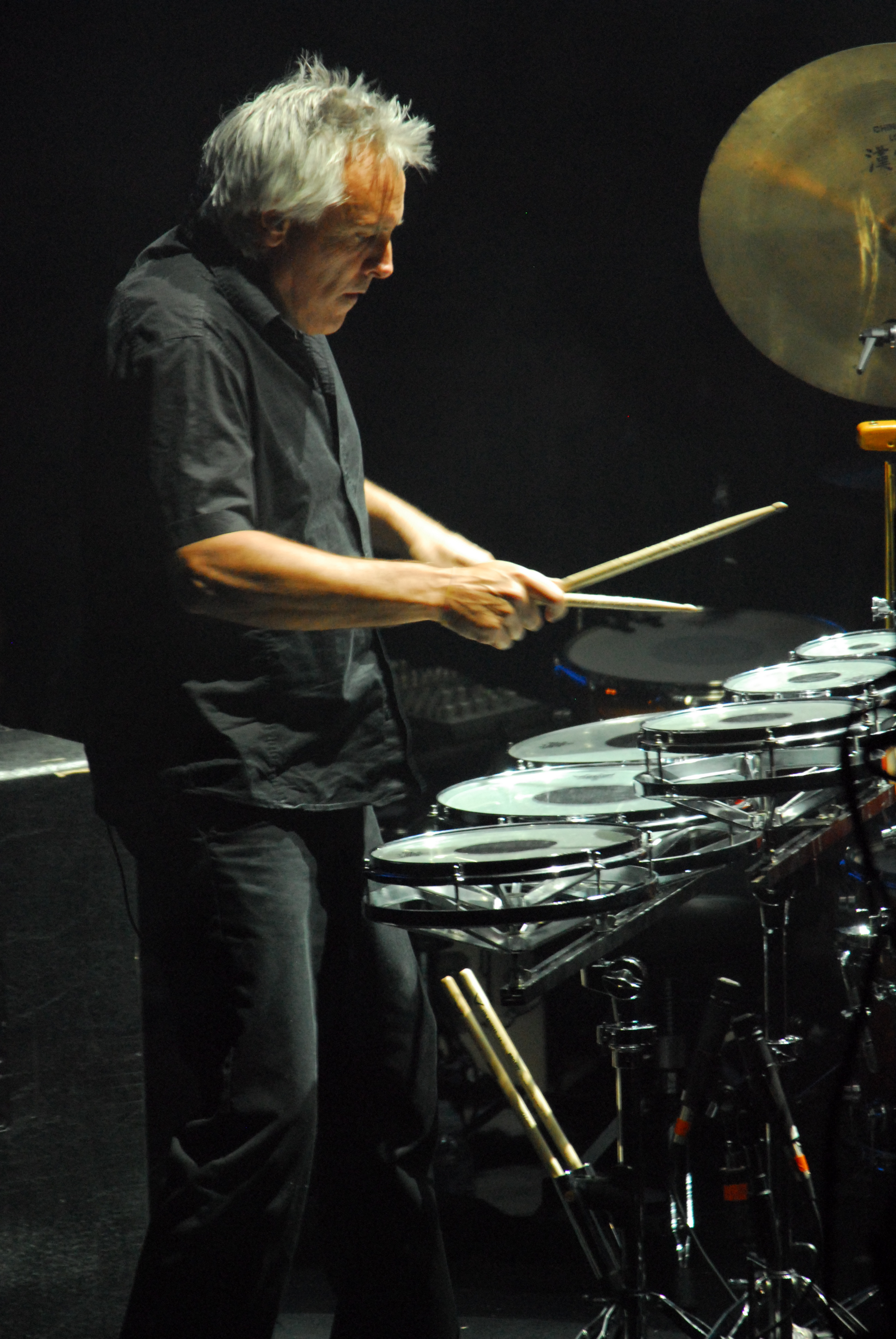
- Broad performing "Time" live with Roger Waters in Ottawa, Ontario, Canada, in 2007

Background information
- Born: 10 March 1957 (age 69); Hammersmith, West London, England
- Genres: Rock; blues; alternative rock; jazz fusion; progressive rock
- Occupations: Musician; record producer
- Instruments: Drums; percussion
- Years active: 1970–present
- Member of: Bill Wyman's Rhythm Kings
- Formerly of: Roger Waters band; Bandit; Procol Harum
- Website: grahambroad.co.uk

Graham Broad (born 10 March 1957) is an English drummer who has been playing professionally since the age of 15, after attending the Royal College of Music in 1970. He is a former pupil of drumming educator Lloyd Ryan, who also taught Phil Collins the drum rudiments.

His works have spanned decades with musicians such as Roger Waters, Tina Turner, The Beach Boys, Procol Harum, Jeff Beck, Tom Cochrane and Red Rider, Van Morrison, Bryan Adams, Bill Wyman, Tony Banks, Peter Cetera and George Michael.

One of the most prolific drummers of the 1980s, his work appeared on Top 10 hits for Bucks Fizz, Dollar, Tina Turner, Bardo, Go West, Five Star, ABC (even appearing in the music video for their smash hit, "When Smokey Sings"), and Wham!.

Broad has been mostly playing with ex-Pink Floyd frontman Roger Waters, since 1987, where he played the drums on Waters' Radio K.A.O.S. album and following tour. In 1990, Broad, who had joined Waters' "Bleeding Heart Band", performed onstage during The Wall Concert in Berlin. In 1992, he played on Waters' third solo album, Amused to Death. In 1999, Waters invited him to join him on his In the Flesh tour, which spanned three years from 1999 to 2002. Broad also participated on The Dark Side of the Moon Live tour, which began in June 2006 and was extended with additional shows to finish in the spring of 2008. Broad played with Roger Waters again in The Wall Live (2010–2013), touring North America and Europe.

Broad wrote and played the drum fill featured in the EastEnders theme tune.

Broad also played with Bill Wyman's Rhythm Kings.

== Discography ==
- Bandit – Bandit (1976)
- Mike Oldfield – Five Miles Out (1982)
- Wham! – Fantastic (1983)
- Culture Club – Colour by numbers (1983)
- Naked Eyes – Fuel for the Fire (1984)
- Tina Turner – Private Dancer (1984)
- Go West – Go West (1985)
- The Beach Boys – The Beach Boys (1985)
- Five Star – Silk & Steel (1986)
- ABC – Alphabet City (1987)
- Roger Waters – Radio K.A.O.S. (1987)
- Roger Waters – Radio K.A.O.S. (tour) (1987–1988)
- The September When – The September When (1989)
- Roger Waters – The Wall – Live in Berlin (1990)
- Tony Banks – Still (1991)
- Bonnie Tyler – Angel Heart (1992)
- Roger Waters – Amused to Death (1992)
- Roger Waters – In the Flesh – Live (1998–1999–2000–2001–2002)
- Roger Waters – The Dark Side of the Moon Live (2006–2007–2008)
- Roger Waters – The Wall Live (concert tour) (2009–2013)
