= Mac and Katie Kissoon =

Trinidad and Tobago sibling pop-soul duo

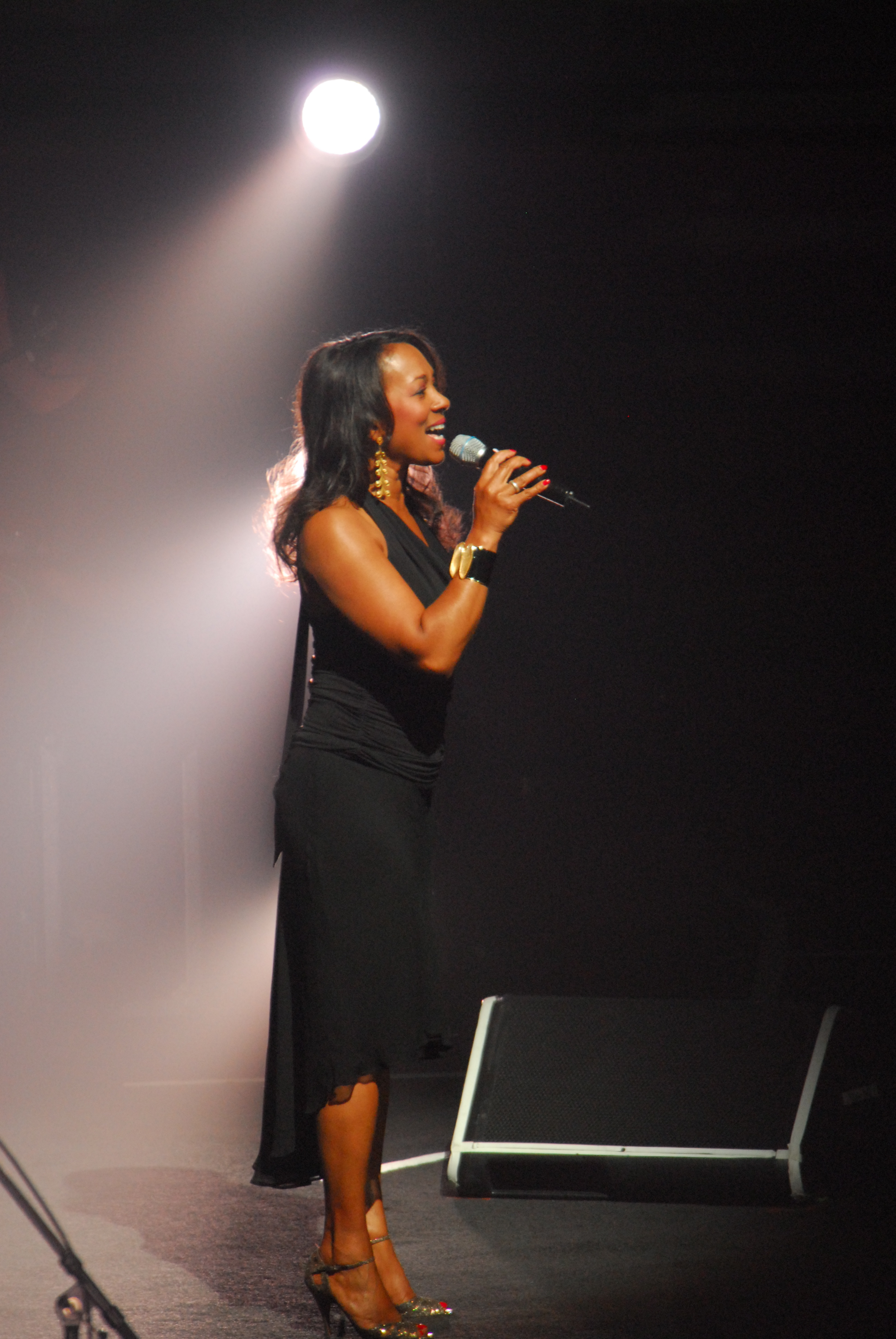
- Katie Kissoon performing with Roger Waters June 6, 2007 in Ottawa, Ontario, Canada

Background information
- Origin: Trinidad
- Genres: Pop; soul; R&B
- Occupations: Musician; songwriter; record producer
- Instrument: Vocals

Mac and Katie Kissoon are a pop soul duo, consisting of brother and sister Mac Kissoon (born Gerald Farthing, November 11, 1943, Port of Spain, Trinidad and Tobago) and Katie Kissoon (born Katherine Farthing, March 11, 1951, Port of Spain).

== Early life and career ==
Mac and Katie Kissoon emigrated to the United Kingdom with their family in 1962. Katie began recording in 1965, cutting a total of four singles under the name Peanut, and was later a member of the Rag Dolls, who had a single released in 1967 and another in 1968. Mac Kissoon was a member of the Marionettes in 1966 and 1967, then fronted his own band which played U.S. bases in Europe. Returning to the UK in 1969, he cut a solo record, "Get Down With It Satisfaction", a medley of songs by Bobby Marchan and the Rolling Stones which became a Top 30 hit in the Netherlands, reaching number 29 in February 1970.

Mac Kissoon released the single "Get Down with It" bw "Care About You" on Young Blood 1001 in 1969. The single which was released in stereo format was reviewed in the 16 August issue of Record Retailer. Kissoon's high-pitched voice was noted as was the interesting arrangement. The reviewer also mentioned the bits of "Satisfaction" that were in the song and finished off with calling the song bluesy and intense but sometimes overdone. The single debuted at No. 13 in the Record Mirror R&B Singles chart for the week of 20 September.

Mac recorded his 1970 solo album Souled Out (aka Sole Satisfaction) which included "Get Down With It / Satisfaction", "Baby I Love You" and "I Can Feel It".

Mac and Katie Kissoon made their first collaborative recording covering the Lally Stott song "Chirpy Chirpy Cheep Cheep" for the UK market. Released July 1971, the Kissoons' version of "Chirpy Chirpy Cheep Cheep" lost out in the UK to another cover by Middle of the Road, who scored a number 1 hit in the UK Singles chart, while the Kissoons' recording stalled at number 41. However, a parallel release of the Kissoons' version of "Chirpy Chirpy Cheep Cheep" in the U.S. became a hit, with the single reaching number 20 on the Billboard Hot 100 in October 1971.

Mac and Katie Kissoon continued to record together, and although their follow-up single to "Chirpy Chirpy Cheep Cheep", "Freedom", failed to chart in either the UK or U.S., the track charted throughout Europe, with estimated sales approaching one million units. Neil Sedaka released "Love Will Keep Us Together" in 1973, and Mac & Katie Kissoon covered the song that year, with a U.S. release in 1974. Captain & Tennille also covered the song in 1975, which became a worldwide hit. The Kissoons continued to have European chart success, particularly in the Netherlands and on the Belgian Dutch-language chart, and finally broke through in the UK in 1975 when "Sugar Candy Kisses" reached number 3.

In 1976 they released the new album The Two of Us, with the single "Dream of Me". In 1979 and 1980, Mac Kissoon had three solo hits in the Netherlands, including "Lavender Blue" and "Love and Understanding", both reaching the Top 10.

Their pop soul music career having receded by the early 1980s, Katie and Mac Kissoon were in demand as backing singers and session musicians. Katie was a member of James Last's singers in the 1980s, her brother Mac continuing there until Last's death. Katie Kissoon's career as backing singer has continued with Van Morrison (1978 and later), Dexys Midnight Runners (1982), Elkie Brooks (1982), Eric Clapton (1986 and later), Roger Waters (since 1984), Elton John (1985), Eros Ramazzotti (1990), George Harrison (1991), Big Country (1991), Pet Shop Boys (1994), George Michael (Unplugged on MTV 1996), Robbie Williams (2000 and later), and Mark Knopfler (2018).

In 1997, Mac and Katie Kissoon released an album of new material called From Now On.

In 2002, Katie Kissoon appeared on stage at the Concert for George. In 2006–2007, she was also part of the backing section for Roger Waters' The Dark Side of the Moon Live world tour. The tour continued for nine dates in 2008, but Katie was unable to perform and was replaced by Sylvia Mason-James. In 2006, Katie provided backing vocals on Andy Fairweather Low's album Sweet Soulful Music.

Katie Kissoon performed backing vocals on Van Morrison's The Healing Game (1997). In 2008, she appeared on his album Keep It Simple, and performed with his band on several concert dates that year.

She appeared as one of several guests of Eric Clapton at his Royal Albert Hall concert on 7 May 2022. She continued to sing backup for Clapton on his 2024-25 tour.

== Available chart information ==
Year	Title	UK	U.S.	NL	BEL	FR	SP
1971	"Chirpy Chirpy Cheep Cheep"	41	20	-	-	-	-
1972	"Freedom"	-	-	3	2	11	1
1972	"Hey You Love"	-	-	-	-	-	1
1972	"Sing Along"	-	-	1	11	23	-
1973	"Song for Everybody"	-	-	18	-	-	-
1973	"Change It All"	-	-	28	-	-	-
1973	"Love Will Keep Us Together"	-	-	12	-	-	-
1975	"Sugar Candy Kisses"	3	-	3	1	-	-
1975	"Don't Do It Baby"	9	-	19	27	-	-
1975	"Like a Butterfly"	18	-	-	-	-	-
1976	"The Two of Us"	46	-	-	-	-	-
1980	"We Are Family"	-	-	20	-	-	-
