= A Raise of Eyebrows =

1967 album by Ron Geesin

Studio album by Ron Geesin
- Released: June 1967
- Studio: Home studio, Notting Hill, London
- Genre: Electronic; experimental; pop; sound collage; avant-garde jazz
- Length: 34:45
- Label: Transatlantic
- Producer: Nathan Joseph

Ron Geesin chronology
A Raise of Eyebrows (1967)	Music from The Body (1970)

A Raise of Eyebrows is the debut album by Scottish composer Ron Geesin, released in June 1967 by Transatlantic Records. Recorded in his home studio in Notting Hill, Geesin aimed to make a humorous album of social commentary that reflected his musical abilities. Considered a work of electronic and experimental music, the album exemplifies Geesin's tape manipulation of sounds and his skills on numerous instruments, including guitar, piano, banjo and devices atypical to music, and explores music, poetry, spoken word, satire, noise, and sound collages.

On release, Transatlantic's promotional campaign for the album emphasised Geesin's distinctiveness as a musician. The record was not a commercial success and divided listeners, but received critical attention for its stereo sound, eclecticism and Geesin's wide instrumental input. John Peel was an early supporter of the album, and it proved influential on Britain's progressive music scene, particularly Pink Floyd, with whom Geesin would later work. In 1996, A Raise of Eyebrows and Geesin's subsequent album As He Stands (1973) were re-released together by See for Miles Records.

== Background and recording ==
After an upbringing in Scotland, Ron Geesin joined Crawley-based trad jazz band The Original Downtown Syncopators in the early 1960s as pianist. He later began playing banjo – an instrument he learned as a child – for the group, and soon performed solos during concerts on piano, banjo and then together on jug and piano, which audiences found amusing. He moved with his future wife Frances to London for its superior working propositions, finding a home on Elgin Crescent, Notting Hill. He later recalled: "I knew that if I didn't get into London before I left that band I was finished as a human being. Fortunately, through another chance, we got a flat in Notting Hill. I didn't know where Notting Hill was really, what it was. Turned out to be the centre of artistic endeavours". Geesin became increasingly intrigued by the act of recording, having been gifted his first tape recorder by Frances, and left the band for a solo career in 1965. The musician's grounding in jazz and love of absurdity and surrealism helped him develop as a solo artist.

Geesin's earliest solo work included an EP, Ron Geesin (1965), and pieces written for documentaries and television advertisements. He credited writing the music for a Trebor Glitter Mints advert with teaching him "how to get to musical unity in 30 seconds", while he derived his sense of structure, timing, phasing and form from Louis Armstrong and Jelly Roll Morton. He built a recording studio in the cramped confines of his basement flat, described as a "studio-cum-control room-cum-workshop", where he became increasingly fascinated with manipulating sounds on his tape recorder, including via tape editing and looping, while unaware of other musicians' experiments in the same field. He later recalled: "Within months I was editing tape like you'd never seen... improvising the equipment, wiring things up in different ways and fiddling about to make interesting sounds." Geesin's compositions became increasingly longer, and he began semi-improvising them in clubs, particularly ones centred on jazz, where he surprised audiences with music that was by turns tonal and atonal with banjo solos and "piano bashing".

His performances led to bookings in more open-minded folk clubs, where he befriended musicians John Renbourn and Ralph McTell, leading Geesin to approach Nathan Joseph's folk and blues label Transatlantic Records. According to Geesin, he showed Joseph several demos, who replied, "We'll take a risk! Go and make some more stuff". Using his home studio, having built up more equipment, Geesin recorded his first album, A Raise of Eyebrows, for the label, The musician would later say his loose aim for the record was "to make a collection of my contemporary capabilities, by whatever means." He felt inspired to use the album as social commentary, feeling that "the time has come for real awareness of surroundings for myself and other human beings." Geesin played every instrument and mixed the album in stereo. Joseph acted as producer, while Adrian Harman provided vocals for "Freedom for Four Voices and Me".

== Composition ==
A Raise of Eyebrows features an idiosyncratic array of music and recitation described by Geesin as "notions and ideas bashed down", including instrumentals, spoken word pieces, audio collages, noise, poetry, satire and vocal grunts, with Geesin employing a sense of humour that has been compared to Ivor Cutler and the "wackiness" of the Goons. The album is considered difficult to pigeonhole, although writers have referred to it as a work of electronic and experimental music. Colin Larkin refers to the record as an experimental sound collage that blends "unusual vocal and instrumental effects with synthesiser and banjo", while Martin C. Strong considered it an eclectic album of avant-garde jazz. Geesin expressed an aversion to genre labels, particularly experimental music, but occasionally termed his work "1967 folk music", explaining: "I'm just trying to put over my observations of life and my life. If that's folk, that's what I'm trying to do."

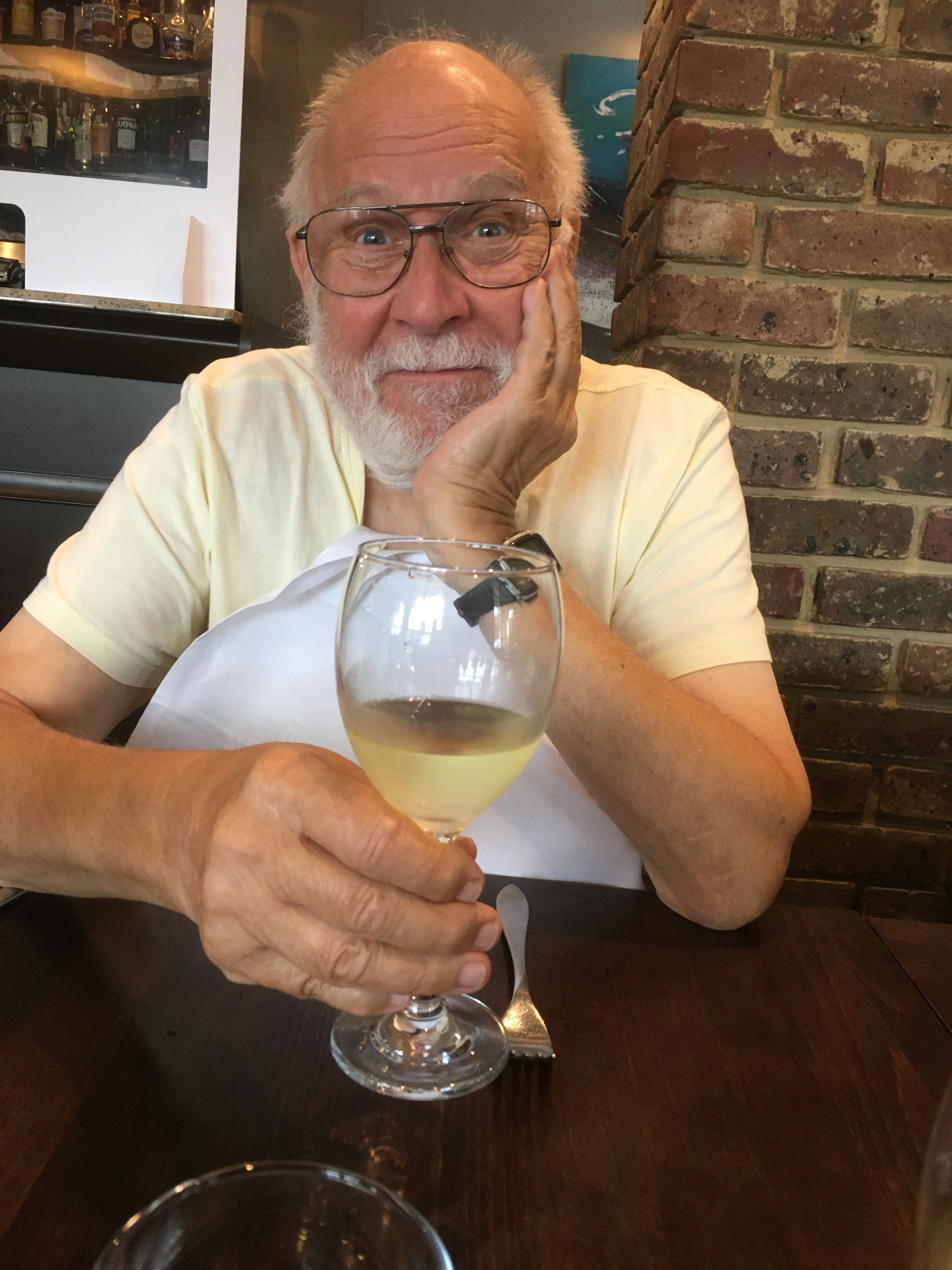
Ron Geesin (2020)

The album profiles Geesin's splicing and collaging of sound (described by Michael Freefrix of Perfect Sound Forever as "surealistic-dadaistic composition"), multitracking efforts, and skills on guitar, 15-string contraguitar, banjo, piano and implements not usually used in music, such as milk bottles and an oil drum. He solos on several of these instruments, as well as harmonica, harmonium and the Red Machine, a red-painted petrol can played with the mouth, The album also sees the musician's keyboard and string skills put to "increasingly eccentric ends", while a passage of ragtime banjo and guitar evokes his trad jazz roots. His poetry ranges from Scottish nonsense verse to social topics, with Geesin wishing to express "social comment with a humorous slant". According to Sarah Gregory of Shindig!, the album moves quickly from "Miligan-esque vocal nonsense to avant-garde improvisation."

The opening title track, described by Geesin as one of his "surreal mini-dramas", opens with smashing glass and laughter intended as an inside joke on a glass concert he attended. He explained: "The girl who was playing had all this marvellous glass, and didn't know what to do with it. This is a monument to her, to the avant garde who just crash without thinking about it." The piece also features whistling sounds from a television and gargling from Geesin, with Christopher Evans of AllMusic saying it resembles "a gaggle of gibbering loonies trapped in a bottle bank." "Freedom for Four Voices and Me" features groaning and multi-tracked chanting from Geesin, "It's All Very New, You Know" is an improvisation and "A Female!" is a spoken piece, while "The Eye That Nearly Saw" features tape manipulations. "A World of Too Much Sound" features kazoo and jug, while "Ha! Ha! But Reasonable" was described by Geesin as one of the album's "jazzy reflections".

== Release and reception ==
Named after what Geesin called a "euphemism for the reaction to complete uproar", A Raise of Eyebrows was released by Transatlantic in June 1967, becoming the first stereo release on what Evans described as a usually "rather staid" label. Its release coincided with a parallel breakthrough, the success of Stephen Dwoskin's Geesin-scored films at the Knokke experimental film festival in Belgium. The liner notes describe Geesin's recordings as "not like any other music" and refers to how audiences "don't know what to make of Ron Geesin", a point emphasised in print advertisements for the album. The record was not a commercial success; according to Evans, the album's inaccessible style proved that Geesin's music "might be a tough sell". However, while the music baffled some listeners, it also attracted Geesin a dedicated fanbase.

In his October 1967 review, Mick Farren of International Times wrote that the "success or failure" of A Raise of Eyebrows depended on enjoyment of Geesin's "Ivor Cutler type sense of humour", finding it to be inferior to the Mothers of Invention as an album of "extreme fringe pop" and derivative as "serious electronic music". However, he praised the stereophonic sound for how voices and instruments "move around the room in an amazing surrealist manner", describing it as likely the most inventive use of stereo since the Beatles' Sgt. Pepper's Lonely Hearts Club Band (May 1967). Robin Denselow of The Observer Review described the album as a mixed media work that is superior to its "rather coy title", drawing attention to Geein's eclectic input and naming it "the most genuine and intelligent protest record to have been made in years", as well as "one of the funniest, one of the most technically brilliant and musically ingenious, and one of the most vicious". Alan Twelftree of Peterborough Standard wrote that audiences "amused and worried" by Geesin's unusual live performances would receive the album in a similar way, writing that Geesin conjures up "even deeper fantasies" on the album than in concert. Beat Instrumental praised Geesin for using his home studio for "some of the most revolutionary recording we've heard of", and wrote that although A Raise of Eyebrow is hard to describe, "the mere fact it was all recorded by Geesin in his studio and accepted by a leading company speaks for itself."

== Legacy and reappraisal ==
Professional ratings
Review scores
Source	Rating
AllMusic	3/5 stars
The Virgin Encyclopedia of Jazz	4/5 stars

A Raise of Eyebrows proved strongly influential on Britain's progressive music scene, particularly on Pink Floyd, who adapted several of Geesin's ideas for Ummagumma (1969), especially on Roger Waters' composition "Several Species of Small Furry Animals Gathered Together in a Cave and Grooving with a Pict". After touring with folk musicians Ralph McTell and Roy Harper in 1969, Geesin worked with Pink Floyd on their album Atom Heart Mother (1970), and recorded a soundtrack album with Waters, Music from The Body (1970), having been introduced to director Roy Battersby through John Peel, who became a fan and supporter of Geesin through A Raise of Eyebrows. Peel's championing of Geesin also led to him featuring on the compilation John Peel Presents Top Gear (1969). For his subsequent album As He Stands (1973), Geesin developed compositions that had originally appeared as prototypes on A Raise of Eyebrows.

In 1996, See for Miles Records remastered A Raise of Eyebrows and As He Stands together as a single CD. Reviewing the release for French magazine Jukebox, Mick Richards wrote that the collectable albums greatly benefited from the remastering, finding Geesin to have fully exploited the era's studio effects, such as overdubs and tape loops, arguing his work to have been a continuation of the Beatles' innovations on Sgt. Pepper. Joseph Morpurgo of Fact describes A Raise of Eyebrows as navigating "an enjoyable path between electronic tomfoolery, hippy-dippy songwriting and Goons-indebted wackiness", and recommended it to fans of Silver Apples' eponymous 1968 album. Karl Dallas described it as "a remarkable album of electronic innovations" that is worth purchasing. The Billboard Guide to Progressive Music recognises Geesin as a pioneer of avant-garde music and describes A Raise of Eyebrows as balancing "some of the most Dadaesque compositions in 20th-century music" with "some fairly insipid monologues which were intended as humor".

== Track listing ==
All tracks composed by Ron Geesin.

=== Side one ===
1. "A Raise of Eyebrows" – 2:17
2. "Freedom for Four Voices and Me" – 2:25
3. "Psychedelia" – 1:06
4. "Positives" – 2:13
5. "It's All Very New, You Know" – 5:36
6. "A Female!" – 0:21
7. "Certainly Random" – 2:49

=== Side two ===
1. "The Eye That Nearly Saw" – 4:29
2. "Two Fifteen String Guitars for Nice People" – 2:28
3. "From an Electric Train" – 3:22
4. "A World of Too Much Sound" – 2:05
5. "Another Female!" – 0:05
6. "We're All Going to Liverpool" – 3:56
7. "Ha! Ha! But Reasonable" – 3:26

== Personnel ==
Adapted from the liner notes of A Raise of Eyebrows

- Ron Geesin – voice, instruments, composition, recording
- Nathan Joseph – production
- Brian Shuel – photography
- Graham Abraham – drawing
- Adrian Harman – voice (track 2)

== See also ==
- Patruns (1975)
