= Transparent Anatomical Manikin =

3D human model for medical training

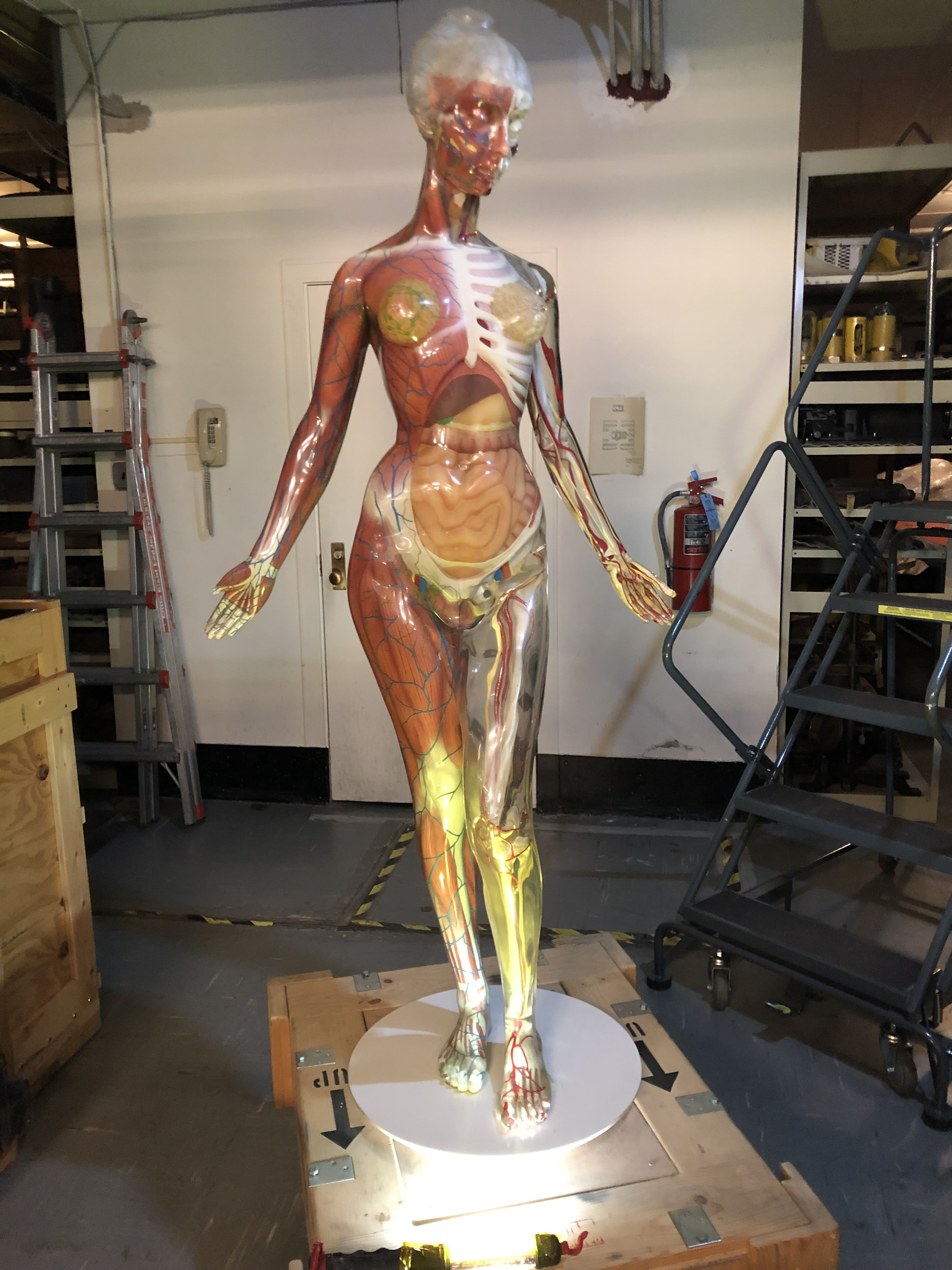
Transparent Anatomical Manikin (TAM)

The Transparent Anatomical Manikin (TAM) is a three-dimensional, transparent anatomical model of a human being, created for medical instructional purposes. TAM was created by designer – Richard Rush, in 1968. It consisted of a see-through reproduction of a female human body, with various organs being wired so specific body systems would light up on command on cue, with a pre-recorded educational presentation.

Rush eventually produced 42 TAMs, many of which are still displayed in US health education museums. A cheaper model – the Mobile TAM, was created by Rush in the 1980s.

The Transparent Anatomical Manikin was used as cover art on the 1970 soundtrack album Music from The Body, by Roger Waters and Ron Geesin, and the American alternative rock band Nirvana's 1993 album In Utero.

== See also ==
- Resusci Anne, a common manikin used in CPR training
- TraumaMan, a surgical training manikin used in ATLS training
- Harvey mannequin
- Medical education mannequin
