= Music from The Body =

Soundtrack album by Ron Geesin and Roger Waters
- Released: 28 November 1970; 1976 (USA)
- Recorded: January–March, August–September 1970
- Genre: Biomusic, experimental, psychedelic folk
- Length: 41:28
- Language: English
- Label: Harvest (UK); Import Records (USA); Restless Retro (1990 CD reissue)
- Producer: Ron Geesin, Roger Waters

Roger Waters chronology
| Music from The Body (1970) | The Pros and Cons of Hitch Hiking (1984) |

Ron Geesin chronology chronology
| A Raise of Eyebrows (1967) | Music from The Body (1970) | Electrosound (1972) |

Professional ratings
Review scores
| Source | Rating |
|---|---|
| Allmusic | 3/5 stars |
| The Rolling Stone Album Guide | 2.5/5 stars |

Music from The Body is the soundtrack album to Roy Battersby's 1970 documentary film The Body, about human biology, narrated by Vanessa Redgrave and Frank Finlay.

== History ==
The music was composed in collaboration between Pink Floyd member Roger Waters and Ron Geesin, who worked together on Atom Heart Mother the same year, and employs biomusic, including, on the first track, sounds made by the human body (slaps, breathing, laughing, whispering, flatulence, etc.), in addition to more traditional guitar, piano and stringed instruments. The album's final track, "Give Birth to a Smile", features all four members of Pink Floyd, plus Geesin on piano, although David Gilmour, Nick Mason and Richard Wright are uncredited.

The child heard on opening track is Ron's son Joe Geesin.

The LP, being a complete re-recording of the score, features a different track listing from the original film soundtrack, and a three sided acetate does exist of the full version. The cover of the album features a Transparent Anatomical Manikin (TAM).

Waters did not release another album outside of Pink Floyd until 1984's The Pros and Cons of Hitch Hiking.

== Track listing ==
All songs written by Ron Geesin, except where noted:

Side One

1. "Our Song" (Geesin/Waters) – 1:24
2. "Sea Shell and Stone" (Waters) – 2:17
3. "Red Stuff Writhe" – 1:11
4. "A Gentle Breeze Blew Through Life" – 1:19
5. "Lick Your Partners" – 0:35
6. "Bridge Passage for Three Plastic Teeth" – 0:35
7. "Chain of Life" (Waters) – 3:59
8. "The Womb Bit" (Geesin/Waters) – 2:06
9. "Embryo Thought" – 0:39
10. "March Past of the Embryos" – 1:08
11. "More Than Seven Dwarfs in Penis-Land" – 2:03
12. "Dance of the Red Corpuscles" – 2:04

Side Two

1. "Body Transport" (Geesin/Waters) – 3:16
2. "Hand Dance — Full Evening Dress" – 1:01
3. "Breathe" (Waters) – 2:53
4. "Old Folks Ascension" – 3:47
5. "Bed-Time-Dream-Clime" – 2:02
6. "Piddle in Perspex" – 0:57
7. "Embryonic Womb-Walk" – 1:14
8. "Mrs. Throat Goes Walking" – 2:05
9. "Sea Shell and Soft Stone" (Geesin/Waters) – 2:05
10. "Give Birth to a Smile" (Waters) – 2:49

== Personnel ==
- Ron Geesin – electric and acoustic guitars, Hammond organ, harmonium, piano, banjo, mandolin, tape effects, vocalizations
- Roger Waters – bass guitar, vocals, acoustic guitar, tape effects, vocalizations
- David Gilmour – electric guitar (on "Give Birth to a Smile"), uncredited
- Nick Mason – drums (on "Give Birth to a Smile"), uncredited
- Richard Wright – Hammond organ (on "Give Birth to a Smile"), uncredited
- Hafliði Hallgrímsson – cello, uncredited
