= The Body (1970 film) =

1970 British documentary film by Roy Battersby

- Directed by: Roy Battersby
- Based on: book by Anthony Smith
- Produced by: Tony Garnett
- Narrated by: Frank Finlay; Vanessa Redgrave
- Cinematography: Tony Imi
- Edited by: Alan Cumner-Price
- Music by: Ron Geesin; Roger Waters
- Production company: Kestrel Films
- Distributed by: Anglo-EMI (UK); MGM (US)
- Release dates: 1970 (UK); 24 February 1971 (US)
- Running time: 93 minutes
- Country: United Kingdom
- Language: English
- Budget: £108,000

The Body is a 1970 British scientific documentary film directed and produced by Roy Battersby. In the film, external and internal cameras are used to showcase the human body.

The film's narrators, Frank Finlay and Vanessa Redgrave, provide commentary that combines the knowledge of human biologists and anatomical experts. The film's soundtrack, Music from the Body, was composed by Ron Geesin and Roger Waters. It includes songs that were made using the human body as a medium. Waters is also the narrator of one scene.

== Production ==
The film was "suggested by" a science book by Anthony Smith.

The cost of optioning film rights and developing the project to take to market cost £11,000 which was financed by the National Film Finance Corporation (NFFC). After a year, by December 1969 Battersby had a script. He showed this to the NFFC which resulted in another draft of the script. The NFFC agreed to provide half of the finance. In March 1969 Battersby met with Nat Cohen at Anglo-Amalgamated who agreed to provide the other half of finance on that day.

Battersby shot about 300,000 feet of film of which 11,000 were used. "There was a lot of blood and film on the cutting room floor," said Garnett.

== Soundtrack ==
Tony Garnett asked John Peel recommendations for who might do the soundtrack. Peel suggested Ron Geesin. Geesin later said:

It was an attempt... to put a deeply socio-human documentary about the human body into cinemas, using some then-pioneering micro-camera work: coursing along the various tubes and all that. The soundtrack did what all film soundtracks are supposed to do: duet with the visual content, for, against, unison, comment. The subsequent album for EMI consisted of most of that soundtrack, in its many parts: mine as originally recorded, Roger’s re-recorded, supplemented by two original tracks, little to do with the film and all to do with Roger and me having fun, "Our Song" and "Body Transport".

== Reception ==
=== Critical ===
Variety wrote " Film will need delicate handling but could attract top attention in carefully-selected situations. It claims not to be a medical or scientific doc, yet undoubtedly is. It’s certainly not entertainment, in the accepted sense."

The Monthly Film Bulletin wrote: "Despite the makers' earnest intentions, there is a general impression of aimlessness. The theme was suggested by Anthony Smith's book, which was if anything too crowded with information; the film, on the contrary, is looking for a wider audience than it would get from an educational approach, and though it claims to 'turn hard facts into exciting visual experiences' the facts are nowhere near hard enough, and nothing is ever really followed through. The splitting of the fertilised egg into cells is followed by the bare statement that the cell is the basic unit of life, which leads into a banal song as the camera slowly and pointlessly moves from a baby along a line of naked people representing the stages of growth and ageing. Similarly the internal photography, though technically superb when it shows, for instance, urine passing into the bladder in geyser-like gusts, amounts to little more than a flow of colourful images, with not much more significance than the arty shots of a grotesquely magnified toe-nail being cut. In fact, the film is most successful when it is most straightforwardly informative, as in the final sequence of the birth of a baby, or the tour round a warehouse containing the thirty tons of food which the average Western man eats in fifty years, though the attempt to contrast this with the average Asian's diet is ruined by the coy whimsicality of the commentary. The gap between intention ('I want my films to assist people to get an insight into their lives and to understand the society they live in, so they are better able to change it') and achievement is most obvious in those sequences in which Roy Battersby cuts together unrelated shots in an attempt to give them a single meaning ... this procedure simply creates a montage of unrelated or arbitrarily related images. "

Filmink called it "bold, interesting, complex – not that well remembered today for some reason, but a remarkable piece of work."

=== Box office ===
In August 1971 Nat Cohen, whose company distributed the film, said it had recouped its negative cost in the Far East alone.

== Home media ==
The film was released on DVD on 7 October 2013.
