= Red Mercury (film) =

- Directed by: Roy Battersby
- Written by: Farrukh Dhondy
- Produced by: Peter Ansorge; Meenu Bachan; Vibha Bhatnagar; Dr. Phil Blackburn; Michael Wearing
- Starring: Stockard Channing; Pete Postlethwaite; Juliet Stevenson; Ron Silver; David Bradley
- Cinematography: Uday Tiwari
- Edited by: Jeremy Gibbs
- Music by: Colin Towns
- Release date: September 2005
- Running time: 113 minutes
- Country: United Kingdom
- Language: English
- Budget: £2,000,000 UK (est.)

Red Mercury is a 2005 British film thriller directed by Roy Battersby and starring Stockard Channing, Pete Postlethwaite, Juliet Stevenson, Ron Silver and David Bradley.

== Plot ==
The film is a thriller about a terrorist kidnapping. Three Islamist terrorist bomb-makers have just obtained some red mercury, a semi-mythical explosive. They get a tipoff that their safehouse is about to be raided and they flee on foot from the police. In an attempt to escape they kidnap hostages in a Greek restaurant in London and threaten to detonate a bomb containing the titular explosive. Eventually they are defeated and the hostages are saved and the film ends.

== Cast ==
- David Bradley as Neil Ashton
- Stockard Channing as Penelope
- Pete Postlethwaite as Gold Commander
- Ron Silver as Sidney
- Juliet Stevenson as Sofia Warburton
- Nigel Terry as Lindsey
- Alex Caan as Mushtaq
- Navin Chowdhry as Asif
- Nicholas Farrell as Minister
- Amanda Ryan as Electra
- Honeysuckle Weeks as Clarissa
- Jason Hughes as Jeff Collins

== Production ==
The film was written, produced and filmed over four months.

The film was the first film aimed for a Western audience produced by a new film production company named Inspire, that planned to apply Bollywood film production methods to films made in the United Kingdom:

“The company was originally set up to do Bollywood films in London that could take advantage of Gordon Brown’s very generous tax breaks. It was Farrukh who persuaded them to start doing British movies. I suppose our analogy was the early Film on Four - a contemporary work which had a more extended life than a TV movie. And it grew from there.”

According to the producers the writer, Farrukh Dhondy, was interviewed by British counter-terrorism officials, to verify that the bomb-plot in the script was unrelated to their active investigations.

== Release ==
The film was sold at the 2005 Cannes Film Market. It was released in the UK shortly after the 7 July 2005 London bombings, rendering its theme of Islamic terrorism particularly topical. It was screened at the Cleveland International Film Festival in 2006. It did not have a theatrical release in the US, being released to DVD in June 2007.

== Reception ==
Variety compared it to Dog Day Afternoon and Juggernaut, as a socially-committed thriller with more talk than action. Their critic praised the technical values and performances, but found some of the plotting to be "sloppy" and "forced" with some characters "underwritten". Jack G Shaheen criticised it for the "one-dimensional" portrayal of the villains.
