= Patruns =

Studio album by Ron Geesin
- Released: 1975
- Recorded: 1975
- Length: 39:00
- Label: Geesin Records RON31
- Producer: Ron Geesin

Ron Geesin chronology
Electrosound, Vol. 2 (1975)	Patruns (1975)	Right Through (1977)

Patruns is an album composed, performed and recorded by Ron Geesin. Released in 1975, Patruns features Geesin's piano only. The LP is not available on CD, with the exception of the frenetic "Smoked Hips (The Time Dance)", which was included in a collection of his work, Hystery.

== Tracks ==
All Tracks Composed by Ron Geesin

1. "B♭ Wink" (2:00)
2. "Octave Creep" (2:00)
3. "Double Octave Ripple" (1:00)
4. "A♭, D♭ and G♭ Black Major Throb" (5:00)
5. "White Note of Calm" (3:00)
6. "Dripped Chromatic Essence" (1:00)
7. "Smoked Hips (The Time Dance)" (5:00)
8. "Grand E♭ Minor Opening" (2:00)
9. "E♭ Minor Paint Splash Slap Lash" (5:00)
10. "E♭ Minor, Lie Down Still!" (2:00)
11. "Patrun Spread" (1:00)
12. "Platform Twitch" (1:00)
13. "Romanian Ragtome Shut" (2:00)
14. "Chromatic Thrashers" (6:00)
15. "Grand B♭ Major Ending Wink" (1.00)
