= Ron Geesin =

Scottish musician and writer (born 1943)

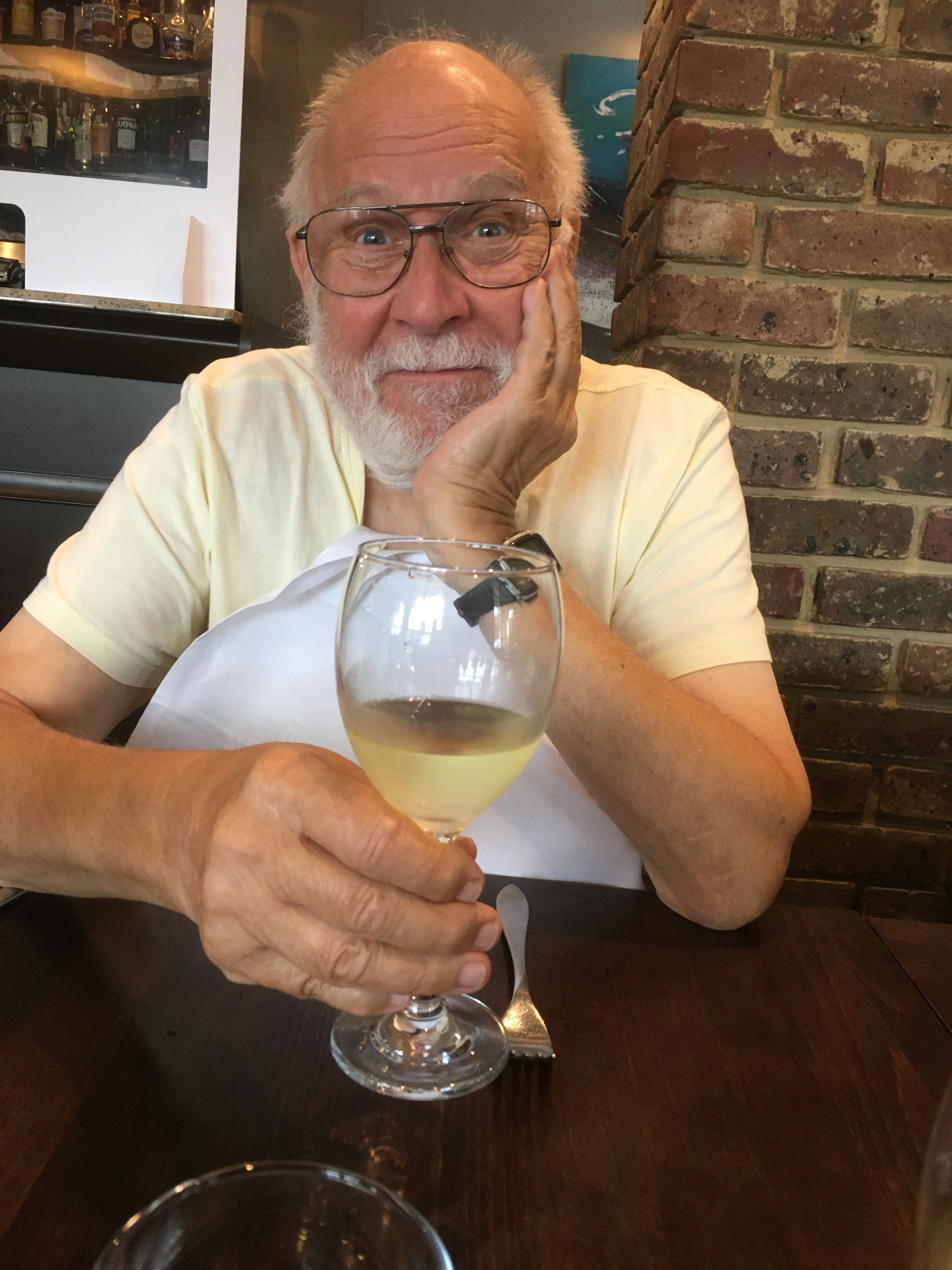
- Geesin in 2020

Background information
- Born: Ronald Frederick Geesin; 17 December 1943 (age 82); Stevenston, Ayrshire, Scotland
- Genres: Avant-garde; experimental rock; musique concrète; symphonic rock
- Instruments: Guitar; mandolin; banjo; keyboards; percussion; tape recorders; computers
- Years active: 1960s–present
- Label: Headscope
- Website: rongeesin.com

Ronald Frederick Geesin (born 17 December 1943) is a Scottish musician, composer and writer known for his unusual creations and novel applications of sound. He is also well known for his collaborations with Pink Floyd and Roger Waters.

== Career ==
Ron Geesin began his career from 1961 to 1965 as pianist with The Original Downtown Syncopators (ODS), a revivalist jazz band emulating the American Original Dixieland Jazz Band. The band was based in Crawley, Sussex, England. After leaving the Original Downtown Syncopators, Geesin’s "chance careering" took three main distinct but parallel routes: 1) live improvised performances in venues as diverse as folk clubs and the Royal Albert Hall; 2) music and effects for The Media, including all four domestic BBC Radio networks, and advertising, documentary and feature films; 3) stand-alone works for LPs and CDs.

After his first solo album in 1967, A Raise of Eyebrows, Geesin launched a one-man record company with the self-released As He Stands, Patruns, and Right Through. In 1971, he produced and played on the pastoral "Songs for the Gentle Man" by Bridget St John. Many of his electronic compositions were used as soundtracks to ITV's 1970s and 1980s television broadcasts for schools and colleges. After scoring The Body (1970), his other film scores include John Schlesinger's film Sunday Bloody Sunday (1971), Ghost Story (1974), Sword of the Valiant (1984) and The Girl in the Picture (1985).

Geesin is known for his collaborations with Pink Floyd and Roger Waters. After the band found themselves deadlocked over how to complete the title track from Atom Heart Mother in 1970, Pink Floyd entrusted him with the backing track mix on tape while they went on a US tour. He analysed and mapped the whole tape, then orchestrated all the material, including melodies, for 10 brass, 20 choir and solo cello. When the group returned from the US, the work was recorded in EMI's Abbey Road Studios. Before this project, Geesin collaborated with the band's bass player Roger Waters on the soundtrack for the feature film, The Body, and compiled the album, Music from The Body (1970), adding two new tracks, including sound samples from the human body.

In the late 1960s and early 1970s, Geesin collaborated with the film maker Stephen Dwoskin on several films including Chinese Checkers, Alone and Naissant. In 1970, he produced a sound-work for the British pavilion at the Osaka world fair. He was featured in 'Crossing Bridges', a 1985 music programme based around jazz guitar improvisation, and broadcast by Channel 4.

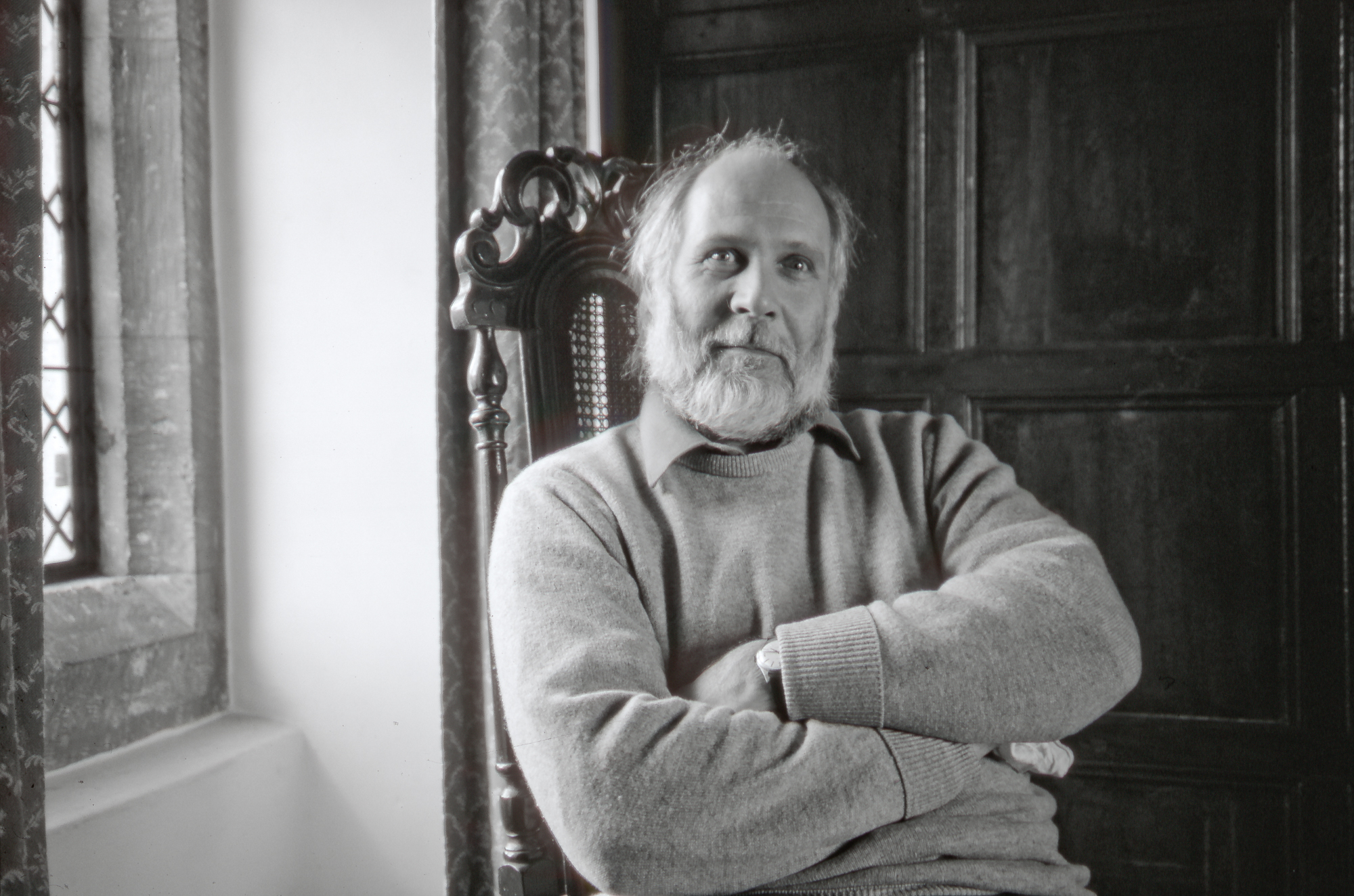
Ron Geesin, composer in residence, Royal Greenwich Observatory, Herstmonceux Castle, Sussex in 1987 (photo: Wenyon & Gamble)

During the 1990s, he collaborated with the artist Ian Breakwell on video projects such as the large-scale work Auditorium and live art pieces such as Christmas Carol (1991) in which four synchronised figures dressed in Santa Claus costumes performed in Newcastle's Northumberland Street, having been banned from the Gateshead MetroCentre. In 1990, he designed and produced the 'Tune Tube', a giant interactive sound and light installation at the MacLellan Galleries, as part of ‘Glasgow 1990’.

One of his rare appearances with other artists on the same album was on the record Miniatures - a sequence of tiny masterpieces (Cherry Red Records, 1980) produced by Morgan Fisher. Like all the other 50 tracks on the album, Geesin's track "Enterbrain Exit" was about one minute long.

In the 1990s, Headscope released two CDs, Funny Frown and Bluefuse, melding modern technology with appropriated and found sounds. In 1994, Cherry Red Records released the Hystery CD, an overview of his career. In 1995, Cleopatra Records released his Land of Mist CD, a collection of instrumental ambience. In 1995, See for Miles Records re-issued his first two vinyl albums on CD. Headscope followed in 2003 with the CD Right Through - and Beyond, a reissue of his last vinyl album, unissued material and a Sour New Year suite.

In 2008, "Atom Heart Mother" was recreated live on stage at the Cadogan Hall, Chelsea, London, featuring brass, choir, cello, and Italian Pink Floyd tribute band Mun Floyd. The track was presented alongside a Geesin solo performance; "Atom Heart Mother" itself was extended to 35 minutes, developing the cello solos and taking in a section originally as written and again as recorded differently. David Gilmour joined the musicians for the second performance. In 2012, the French Education System chose it to be studied within the Baccalauréat 2012-2013. Geesin took part in the live performance that was also videoed at the Théatre du Châtelet, Paris in January 2012.

Geesin's 2011 album was called Roncycle1: the journey of a melody. In 2012, he was asked by The History Press to write his version of the history of "Atom Heart Mother (suite)", published in July 2013 and titled The Flaming Cow. An avid collector of adjustable spanners (wrenches), amassing 3,000 specimens over a thirty-year period, in 2016 he published The Adjustable Spanner. Late in 2020, Headscope published his collected writings as The Stapled Brain.

In 2019, the Italian avantgarde label Dark Companion published ExpoZoom, an unissued work commissioned by the British Council to Geesin for the British Pavilion at the 1970 expo in Japan.

Geesin is married to the artist Frances Geesin. The couple collaborated in 1990 on an interactive installation of three panels called Tri-Aura at The Science Museum, London.

== Discography ==
- Ron Geesin (private EP) (1965)
- A Raise of Eyebrows (1967)
- Music from The Body (1970) (with Roger Waters)
- Electrosound (1972)
- As He Stands (1973)
- Electrosound (volume 2) (1975)
- Patruns (1975)
- Atmospheres (1977)
- Right Through (1977)
- Magnificent Machines (1988)
- Funny Frown (1991)
- Bluefuse (1993)
- Hystery (1994) (Compilation)
- Land of Mist (1995)
- A Raise of Eyebrows/As He Stands (1995) (2 albums on one CD)
- Right Through and Beyond (2003) (Right Through plus additional tracks)
- Biting The Hand (2008)
- Roncycle1 (2011)
- Samla Mammas Manna & Ron Geesin: Live Tonkraft 1975 (Swedish Radio recordings) (2013)
- ExpoZoom (2019)
- Pot-Boilers (2020)
- Sunday Bloody Sunday (2022)
- Basic Maths (2024 - music from the 1980s TV series)
- Staring Sane (2026)

== Bibliography ==
- Fallables (1970)
- The Flaming Cow: The Making of Pink Floyd's Atom Heart Mother (2013)
- The Adjustable Spanner: History, origins and development to 1970 (2016)
