= Roger Waters =

English musician and songwriter (born 1943)

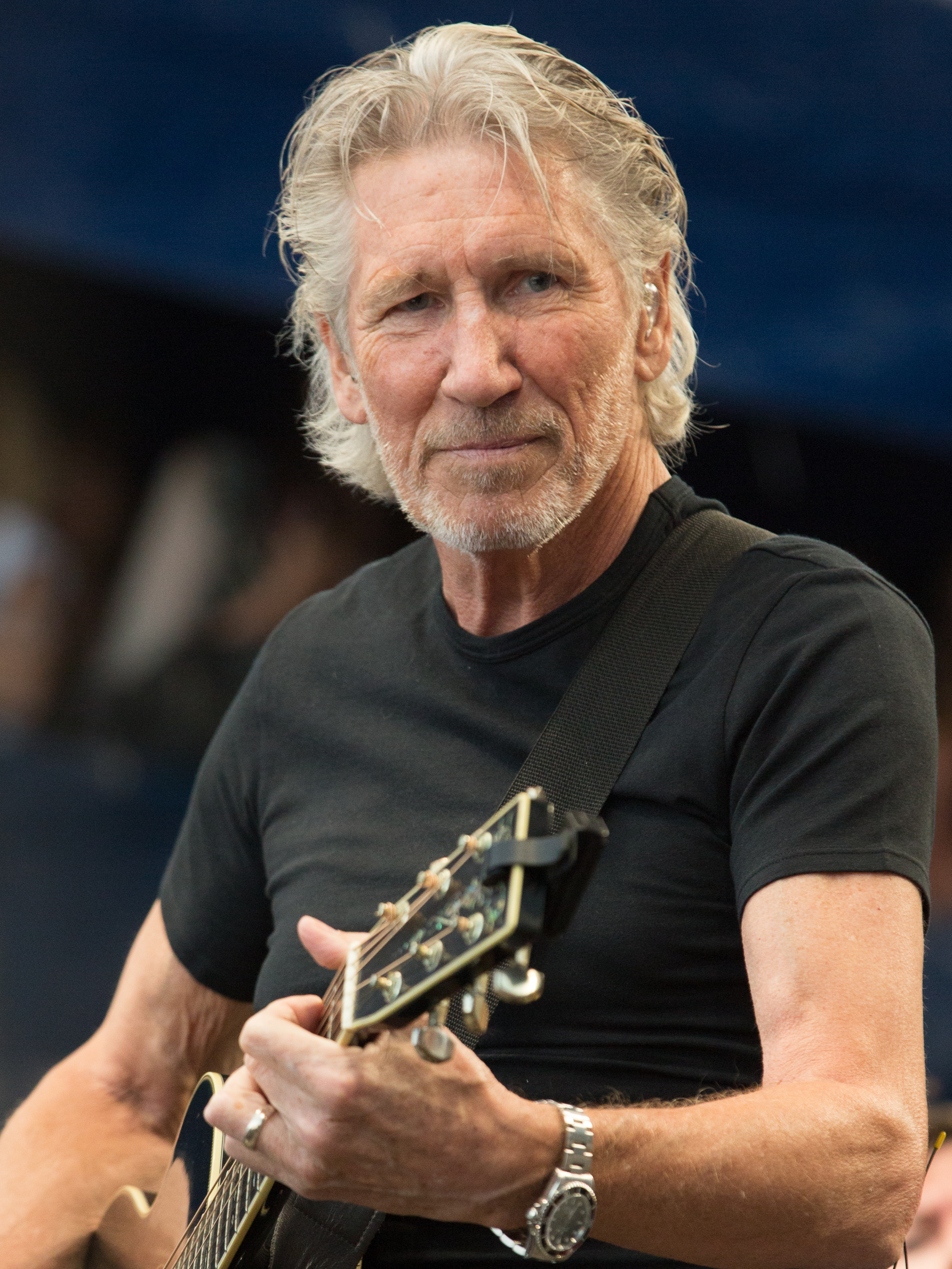
- Waters in 2015

Background information
- Born: George Roger Waters; 6 September 1943 (age 83); Great Bookham, Surrey, England
- Genres: Progressive rock; psychedelic rock; art rock; blues rock
- Occupations: Singer; musician; songwriter; composer; record producer
- Instruments: Vocals; bass guitar; guitar
- Works: Discography; songs
- Years active: 1960–present
- Labels: Capitol; Columbia; Sony; Harvest
- Formerly of: Pink Floyd; The Bleeding Heart Band
- Spouses: List: Judith Trim (m. 1969; div. 1975); Carolyne Christie (m. 1976; div. 1992); Priscilla Phillips (m. 1993; div. 2001); Laurie Durning (m. 2012; div. 2015); Kamilah Chavis (m. 2021)
- Members: List
- Website: rogerwaters.com
- Roger Waters's voice from the BBC programme Desert Island Discs, 29 May 2011

George Roger Waters (born 6 September 1943) is an English singer-songwriter, musician and political activist. In 1965, he co-founded the rock band Pink Floyd as the bassist. Following the departure of the band's main songwriter Syd Barrett in 1968, Waters became Pink Floyd's principal lyricist, co-lead vocalist and conceptual leader until his departure in 1985.

Pink Floyd achieved international success with the concept albums The Dark Side of the Moon (1973), Wish You Were Here (1975), Animals (1977), The Wall (1979), and The Final Cut (1983). By the early 1980s, they had become one of the most acclaimed and commercially successful groups in popular music. Amid creative differences, Waters left in 1985 and began a legal dispute over the use of the band's name and material. They settled out of court in 1987. His solo work includes the studio albums The Pros and Cons of Hitch Hiking (1984), Radio K.A.O.S. (1987), Amused to Death (1992), and Is This the Life We Really Want? (2017). In 2005, he released Ça Ira, an opera translated from Étienne and Nadine Roda-Gils's libretto about the French Revolution.

In 1990, Waters staged one of the largest rock concerts in history, The Wall – Live in Berlin. As a member of Pink Floyd, he was inducted into the US Rock and Roll Hall of Fame in 1996 and the UK Music Hall of Fame in 2005. Later in 2005, he reunited with Pink Floyd for the Live 8 global awareness event, their only appearance with Waters since 1981. He has toured extensively as a solo act since 1999. He performed The Dark Side of the Moon for his world tour of 2006–2008, and The Wall Live, his tour of 2010–2013, was the highest-grossing tour by a solo artist at the time.

Waters incorporates political themes in his work, many of them considered radical. He supports socialism, has defended Vladimir Putin and the Russian invasion of Ukraine, and has been ruled by a court to have made defamatory comments. Waters is a prominent supporter of Palestine in the Israeli–Palestinian conflict and Gazan genocide. He supports the Boycott, Divestment and Sanctions (BDS) movement against Israel, and describes Israel's treatment of Palestinians as apartheid. Elements of his live show and some of his comments, such as his likening of Israel to Nazi Germany, have drawn accusations of antisemitism, which Waters has dismissed as a conflation with anti-Zionism. Waters has been dropped, banned or sanctioned by a wide variety of entities in reaction to his comments, including Major League Baseball, BMG Rights Management, the German city of Frankfurt, multiple Argentine hotels, and the country of Poland. Waters has contributed to financing a land deal that returned 4.5 acres of private property to the Shinnecock Nation. The land includes the Shinnecock Nation's ancestral burial grounds.

== Early years ==
Roger Waters, on the knee of his mother, Mary, with his father, Eric (in military uniform) and older brother John

Waters was born on 6 September 1943, the younger of two boys, to Mary (née Whyte; 1913–2009) and Eric Fletcher Waters (1913–1944), in Great Bookham, Surrey. His father, the son of a coal miner and Labour Party activist, was a schoolteacher, a devout Christian, and a Communist Party member. His older brother, John, predeceased him.

In the early years of the Second World War, Waters's father was a conscientious objector who drove an ambulance during the Blitz. He later changed his stance on pacifism, joined the Territorial Army and was commissioned into the 8th Battalion, Royal Fusiliers, as a second lieutenant on 11 September 1943. He was killed five months later on 18 February 1944 at Aprilia, during the Battle of Anzio, when Roger was five months old. He is commemorated in Aprilia and at the Cassino War Cemetery. On 18 February 2014, Waters unveiled a monument to his father and other war casualties in Aprilia, Italy, and was made an honorary citizen of Anzio. Following her husband's death, Mary Waters, also a teacher, moved with her two sons to Cambridge and raised them there. Waters's earliest memory is of the V-J Day celebrations.

Waters attended Morley Memorial Junior School in Cambridge and then the Cambridgeshire High School for Boys (now Hills Road Sixth Form College) with Syd Barrett. The future Pink Floyd guitarist David Gilmour lived nearby on Mill Road and attended the Perse School. At 15, Waters was chairman of the Cambridge Youth Campaign for Nuclear Disarmament (YCND), having designed its publicity poster and participated in its organisation. He was a keen sportsman and a highly regarded member of the high school's cricket and rugby teams. He was unhappy at school, saying: "I hated every second of it, apart from games. The regime at school was a very oppressive one ... The same kids who are susceptible to bullying by other kids are also susceptible to bullying by the teachers."

Waters initially considered a career in mechanical engineering. In 1962, after a series of aptitude tests suggested he was suited to architecture, he enrolled at the Regent Street Polytechnic School of Architecture, London, where he met his future Pink Floyd bandmates Nick Mason and Richard Wright.

== 1965–1985: Pink Floyd ==
=== Formation and Barrett-led period ===
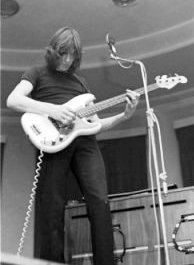
Waters performing with Pink Floyd at Leeds University in 1970

By September 1963, Waters and Mason had lost interest in their studies and moved into a lower flat in Stanhope Gardens, owned by Mike Leonard, a part-time tutor at the Regent Street Polytechnic. Waters, Mason and Wright first played music together in late 1963, in a band formed by the vocalist Keith Noble and bassist Clive Metcalfe. They usually called themselves Sigma 6, but also used the name the Meggadeaths. Waters played rhythm guitar, Mason played drums, Wright played any keyboard he could arrange to use, and Noble's sister Sheilagh provided occasional vocals. In the early years the band performed during private functions and rehearsed in a tearoom in the basement of Regent Street Polytechnic.

When Metcalfe and Noble left to form their own group in September 1963, the remaining members asked Barrett and the guitarist Bob Klose to join. Waters switched to the bass. By January 1964, the group became known as the Abdabs, or the Screaming Abdabs. During late 1964, the band used the names Leonard's Lodgers, Spectrum Five and, eventually, the Tea Set. In late 1965, the Tea Set had changed their name to the Pink Floyd Sound, later the Pink Floyd Blues Band and, by early 1966, Pink Floyd.

By early 1966, Barrett was Pink Floyd's frontman, guitarist, and songwriter. He wrote or co-wrote all but one track of their debut LP The Piper at the Gates of Dawn, released in August 1967. Waters contributed the song "Take Up Thy Stethoscope and Walk" (his first sole writing credit) to the album. By late 1967, Barrett's deteriorating mental health and increasingly erratic behaviour rendered him "unable or unwilling" to continue in his capacity as Pink Floyd's songwriter and lead guitarist.

In early March 1968, to discuss the band's future, Barrett, Mason, Waters, and Wright met with the band's managers, Peter Jenner and Andrew King, of the rock music management company they had all founded, Blackhill Enterprises. Barrett agreed to leave Pink Floyd, and the band "agreed to Blackhill's entitlement in perpetuity" regarding "past activities". Their new manager, Steve O'Rourke, made a formal announcement about the departure of Barrett and the arrival of Gilmour in April 1968.

=== Waters-led period ===
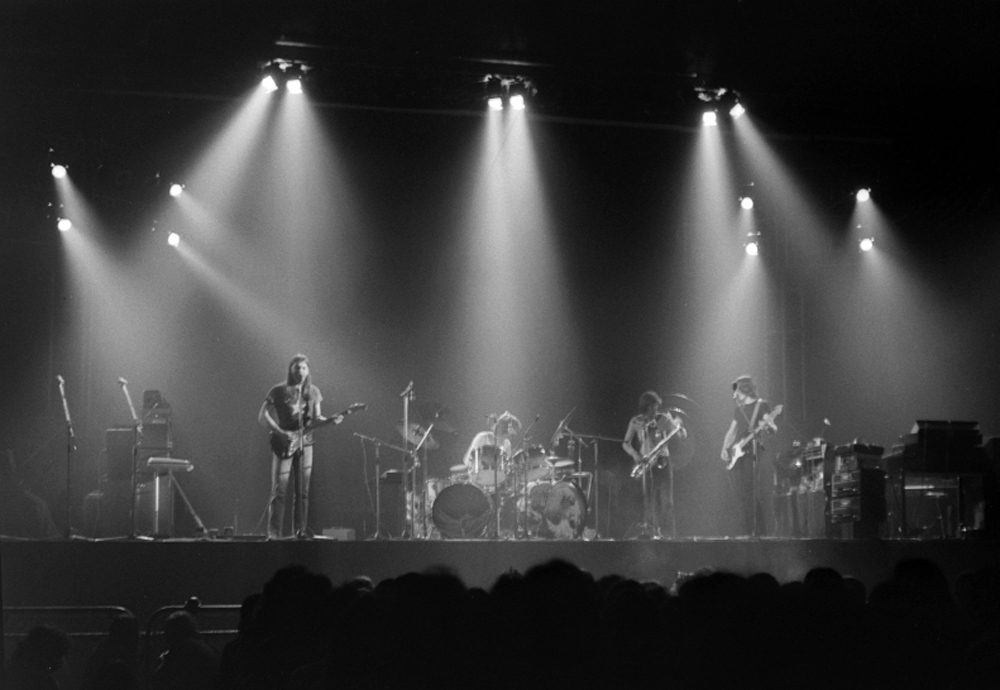
A live performance of The Dark Side of the Moon at Earls Court Exhibition Centre, shortly after its release in 1973: (l–r) David Gilmour, Nick Mason, Dick Parry, Roger Waters

After Barrett's departure in March 1968, Waters began to chart Pink Floyd's artistic direction. In 1970, he composed—in collaboration with Ron Geesin—Music from The Body, a soundtrack for Roy Battersby's documentary The Body.

Waters said he wanted to "drag [Pink Floyd] kicking and screaming back from the borders of space, from the whimsy that Syd was into, to my concerns, which were much more political and philosophical". He became a dominant songwriter and the band's principal lyricist, sharing lead vocals with Gilmour and sometimes Wright. Throughout the late 1970s, he was the band's dominant creative figure until his departure in 1985. He wrote most of the lyrics to the five Pink Floyd albums preceding his departure, starting with The Dark Side of the Moon (1973) and ending with The Final Cut (1983), while exerting progressively more creative control. Every Waters studio album from The Dark Side of the Moon onwards has been a concept album.

With lyrics entirely by Waters, The Dark Side of the Moon is one of the most successful rock albums ever. It spent 736 consecutive weeks on the Billboard 200 chart—until July 1988—and sold over 40 million copies worldwide. As of 2005, it continued to sell over 8,000 copies a week. According to the Pink Floyd biographer Glenn Povey, Dark Side of the Moon is the world's second-bestselling album and the United States' 21st-bestselling album. In 2006, asked if he felt his goals for Dark Side had been accomplished, Waters said his wife wept the first time he played it for her: "You then hear it with fresh ears when you play it for somebody else. And at that point I thought to myself, 'Wow, this is a pretty complete piece of work,' and I had every confidence that people would respond to it."

Waters's thematic ideas became the impetus for the concept albums The Dark Side of the Moon (1973), Wish You Were Here (1975), Animals (1977) and The Wall (1979)—written largely by Waters—and The Final Cut (1983), written entirely by him. The cost of war and the loss of his father became a recurring theme, from "Corporal Clegg" (A Saucerful of Secrets, 1968) and "Free Four" (Obscured by Clouds, 1972) to "Us and Them" from The Dark Side of the Moon, "When the Tigers Broke Free", first used in the feature film The Wall (1982), later included with "The Fletcher Memorial Home" on The Final Cut, an album dedicated to his father. The theme and composition of The Wall was influenced by his upbringing in an English society depleted of men after World War II.

The Wall, written almost entirely by Waters, is largely based on his life story. Having sold over 23 million RIAA certified units in the US as of 2013, is tied for sixth-most certified album of all time in America. Pink Floyd hired Bob Ezrin to co-produce the album and cartoonist Gerald Scarfe to illustrate the sleeve art. They embarked on The Wall Tour of Los Angeles, New York, London, and Dortmund, Germany. The last Pink Floyd performance of The Wall was on 17 June 1981, at Earls Court London, and this was Pink Floyd's last appearance with Waters until the band's brief reunion at 2 July 2005 Live 8 concert in London's Hyde Park, 24 years later.

In March 1983, the last Pink Floyd album with Waters, The Final Cut, was released. It was subtitled "A requiem for the post-war dream by Roger Waters, performed by Pink Floyd". Waters wrote all the album's lyrics and music. His lyrics were critical of the Conservative Party government of the day and mention Prime Minister Margaret Thatcher by name. At the time, Gilmour did not have any new material, so he asked Waters to delay the recording until he could write some songs, but Waters refused. According to Mason, after power struggles within the band and creative arguments about the album, Gilmour's name "disappeared" from the production credits, though he retained his pay. Rolling Stone gave the album five stars, with Kurt Loder describing it as "a superlative achievement" and "art rock's crowning masterpiece". Loder viewed the work as "essentially a Roger Waters solo album".

=== Departure and legal battles ===
Amidst creative differences, Waters left Pink Floyd in 1985 and began a legal battle with the band regarding their continued use of the name and material. In December 1985, Waters issued a statement to EMI and CBS invoking the "Leaving Member" clause in his contract. In October 1986, he initiated High Court proceedings to formally dissolve the Pink Floyd partnership. In his submission to the High Court he called Pink Floyd a "spent force creatively." Gilmour and Mason opposed the application and announced their intention to continue as Pink Floyd. Waters said he had been forced to resign like Barrett had been years earlier, and decided to leave the band based on legal considerations, saying: "If I hadn't, the financial repercussions would have wiped me out completely."

Waters did not want the band to use the name Pink Floyd without him. He said later: "I would be distressed if Paul McCartney and Ringo Starr made records and went on the road calling themselves the Beatles. If John Lennon's not in it, it's sacrilegious ... To continue with Gilmour and Mason, getting in a whole bunch of other people to write the material, seems to me an insult to the work that came before." In December 1987, Waters and Pink Floyd reached an agreement. Waters was released from his contractual obligation with O'Rourke, and he retained the copyrights to the Wall concept and the inflatable Animals pig. Pink Floyd released three studio albums without him: A Momentary Lapse of Reason (1987), The Division Bell (1994) and The Endless River (2014). According to a 1999 interview with Gilmour, Waters declined an invitation to perform The Dark Side of the Moon with Pink Floyd at Earls Court, London.

In 2005, Waters said the period of his departure had been a "bad, negative time", and that he regretted his part in the negativity: "Why should I have imposed my feeling about the work and what it was worth on the others if they didn't feel the same? I was wrong in attempting to do that." In 2013, Waters said he regretted the lawsuit and had failed to appreciate that the Pink Floyd name had commercial value independent of the band members.

== 1984–present: solo career ==
=== 1984–1989: The Pros and Cons of Hitch Hiking and Radio K.A.O.S. ===
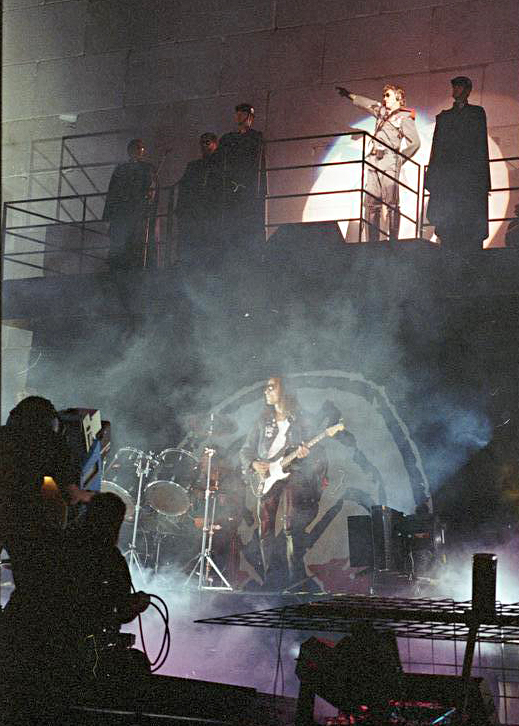
Waters (top) performing The Wall – Live in Berlin on 21 July 1990

In 1984, Waters released his first solo album, The Pros and Cons of Hitch Hiking, which dealt with Waters's feelings about monogamy and family life versus "the call of the wild." The protagonist, Reg, finally chooses love and matrimony over promiscuity. The album features the guitarist Eric Clapton, the jazz saxophonist David Sanborn, and artwork by Gerald Scarfe. Kurt Loder described The Pros And Cons of Hitch Hiking as a "strangely static, faintly hideous record". Rolling Stone rated the album a "rock bottom one star". Years later, Mike DeGagne of AllMusic praised its "ingenious symbolism" and "brilliant use of stream of consciousness within a subconscious realm", rating it four out of five.

Waters toured the album with Clapton, a new band, and new material; the shows included a selection of Pink Floyd songs. Waters débuted his tour in Stockholm on 16 June 1984. The tour drew poor ticket sales and some performances at larger venues were cancelled; Waters estimated that he lost £400,000 on the tour. In March and April 1985, played a tour of smaller venues in North America on a tour called "Pros and Cons Plus Some Old Pink Floyd Stuff".The Pros and Cons of Hitch Hiking was certified gold in the US.

In 1986, Waters contributed songs and a score to the soundtrack of the animated film When the Wind Blows, based on the book by Raymond Briggs. His band, featuring Paul Carrack, was credited as the Bleeding Heart Band. In 1987, Waters released Radio K.A.O.S., a concept album based on a mute man named Billy from an impoverished Welsh mining town who has the ability to tune into radio waves in his head. Billy learns to communicate with a radio DJ, and eventually to control the world's computers. Angry at the state of the world in which he lives, he simulates a nuclear attack. Waters followed the release with a tour.

=== 1989–1999: The Wall – Live in Berlin and Amused to Death ===
In November 1989, the Berlin Wall fell, and in July 1990 Waters staged one of the largest and most elaborate rock concerts in history, The Wall – Live in Berlin, on the vacant terrain between Potsdamer Platz and the Brandenburg Gate. The show reported an attendance of 200,000, though some estimates are as much as twice that, with approximately one billion television viewers. Leonard Cheshire asked Waters to perform the concert to raise funds for charity. Waters's musicians included Joni Mitchell, Van Morrison, Cyndi Lauper, Bryan Adams, Scorpions, and Sinéad O'Connor.

Waters also used an East German symphony orchestra and choir, a Soviet marching band, and a pair of helicopters from the US 7th Airborne Command and Control Squadron. Designed by Mark Fisher, the wall was 25 metres tall and 170 metres long and was built across the set, and Scarfe's inflatable puppets were recreated on an enlarged scale. Many rock icons received invitations to the show, though Gilmour, Mason, and Wright did not. Waters released a double album of the performance, which has been certified platinum by the RIAA.

In 1990, Waters hired manager Mark Fenwick and left EMI for a worldwide deal with Columbia. He released his third studio album, Amused to Death, in 1992. The record was influenced heavily by the events of the Tiananmen Square protests of 1989 and the Gulf War, and a critique of the notion of war becoming the subject of entertainment, particularly on television. The title was derived from the book Amusing Ourselves to Death by Neil Postman. Patrick Leonard, who worked on A Momentary Lapse of Reason, co-produced the album. Jeff Beck played lead guitar on many of the album's tracks, which were recorded with a cast of musicians at ten different recording studios.

It is Waters's most critically acclaimed solo recording, garnering comparison to his work with Pink Floyd. Waters described the record as a "stunning piece of work", ranking it alongside Dark Side of the Moon and The Wall as one of the best of his career. The song "What God Wants, Pt. 1" reached number 35 in the UK in September 1992 and number 5 on Billboard's Mainstream Rock Tracks chart in the US. Amused to Death was certified Silver by the British Phonographic Industry.

Sales of Amused to Death topped out at around one million and there was no tour in support of the album. Waters first performed material from it seven years later during his In the Flesh tour. In 1996, Waters was inducted into the US and UK Rock and Roll Halls of Fame as a member of Pink Floyd.

=== 1999–2004: In the Flesh tour and Wall Broadway production ===
In 1999, after a 12-year hiatus from touring and a seven-year absence from the music industry, Waters embarked on the In the Flesh tour, performing both solo and Pink Floyd material. The tour was a financial success in the US; though Waters had booked mostly smaller venues, tickets sold so well that many of the concerts were upgraded to larger ones. The tour eventually stretched across the world and spanned three years. A concert film was released on CD and DVD, In the Flesh – Live. During the tour, Waters played two new songs "Flickering Flame" and "Each Small Candle" as the final encore to many of the shows. In June 2002, he completed the tour with a performance in front of 70,000 people at the Glastonbury Festival of Performing Arts, playing 15 Pink Floyd songs and five songs from his solo catalogue.

Miramax announced in 2004 that a production of The Wall was to appear on Broadway with Waters playing a prominent role in the creative direction. Reports stated that the musical contained not only the original tracks from The Wall, but also songs from Dark Side of the Moon, Wish You Were Here and other Pink Floyd albums, as well as new material. On the night of 1 May 2004, recorded extracts from the opera, including its overture, were played on the occasion of the Welcome Europe celebrations in the accession country of Malta. Gert Hof mixed recorded excerpts from the opera into a continuous piece of music which was played as an accompaniment to a large light and fireworks display over Grand Harbour in Valletta. In July 2004, Waters released two new tracks online: "To Kill the Child", inspired by the 2003 invasion of Iraq, and "Leaving Beirut", an anti-war song inspired by his travels in the Middle East as a teenager.

=== 2005: Pink Floyd reunion and Ça Ira ===
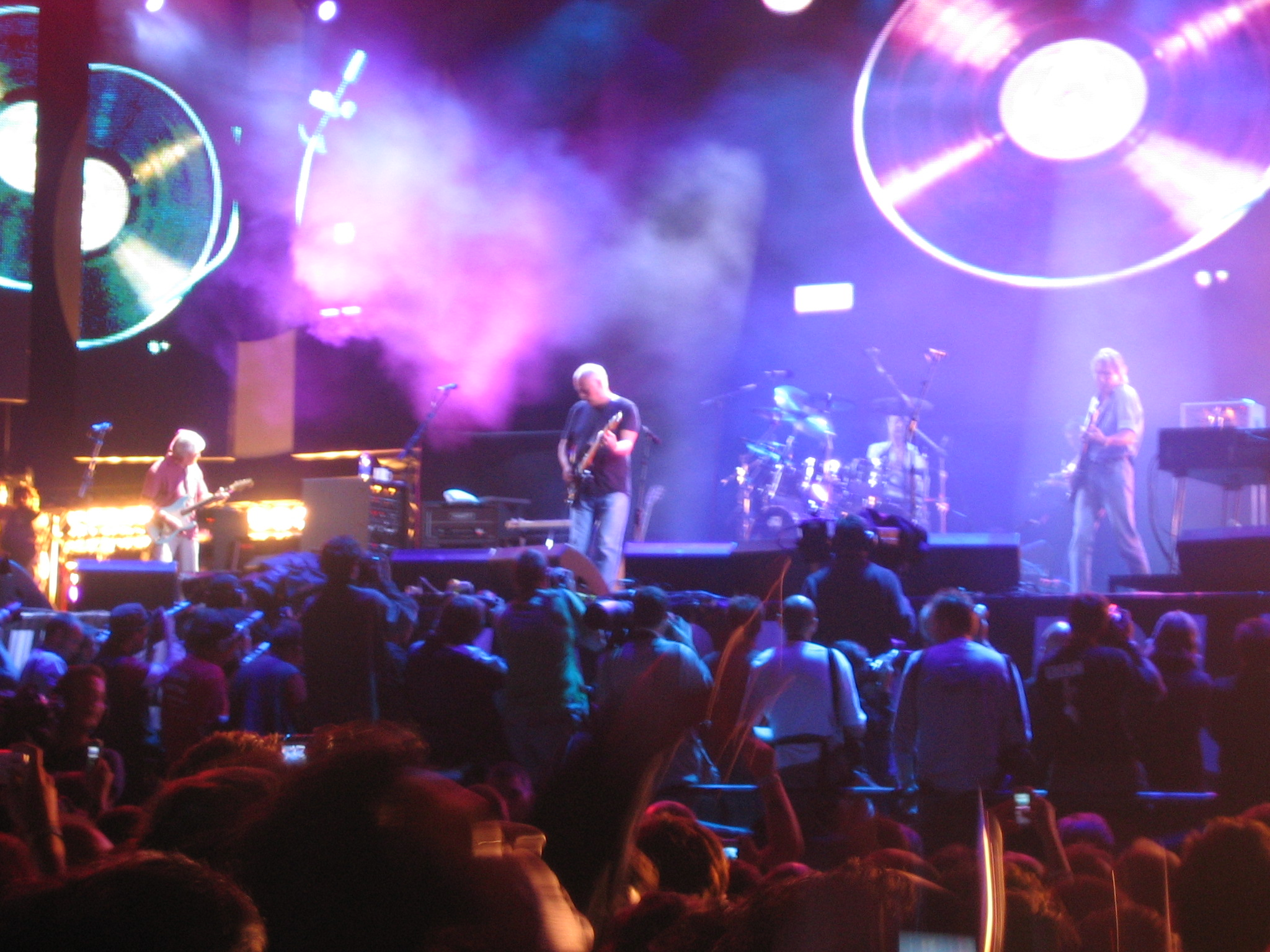
Waters (far right) performing with Pink Floyd at Live 8, 2 July 2005

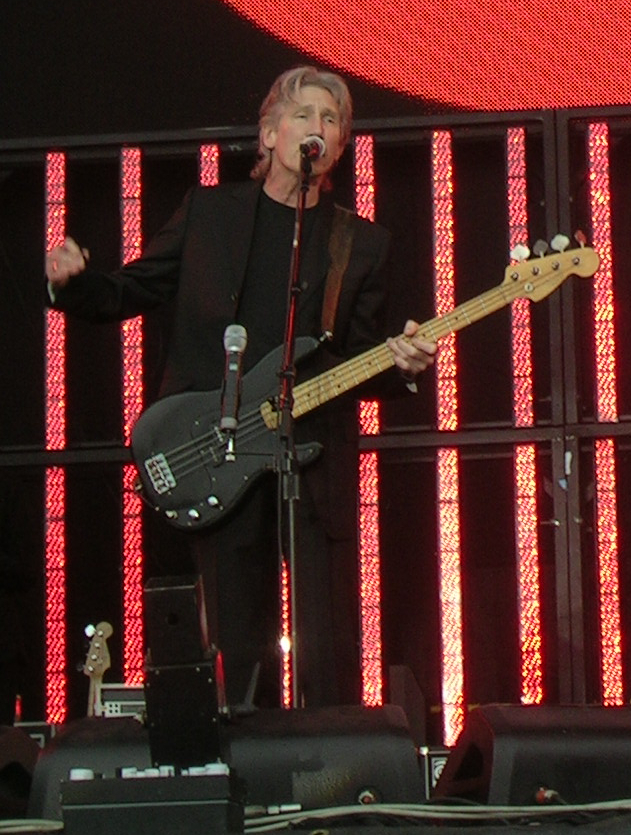
Waters playing "In the Flesh" on his Dark Side of the Moon Tour at Viking Stadion, Stavanger, 26 June 2006

In January 2005, following the 2004 Indian Ocean earthquake and subsequent tsunami disaster, Waters performed "Wish You Were Here" with Eric Clapton during a benefit concert which aired on the American network NBC. In July that year, Waters reunited with Mason, Wright, and Gilmour for their final performance together at the Live 8 concert in London's Hyde Park. This was Pink Floyd's only appearance with Waters since their final performance of The Wall at Earls Court London 24 years earlier. They played a 23-minute set consisting of "Speak to Me/Breathe"/"Breathe (Reprise)", "Money", "Wish You Were Here", and "Comfortably Numb". Waters told the Associated Press that while the experience of playing with Pink Floyd again was positive, the chances of a bona fide reunion would be "slight" considering his and Gilmour's continuing musical and ideological differences. Though Waters had differing ideas about which songs they should play, he "agreed to roll over for one night only". In November 2005, Pink Floyd were inducted into the UK Music Hall of Fame by Pete Townshend of the Who.

In September 2005, Waters released Ça Ira (pronounced [sa iˈʁa], French for "it will be fine"; Waters added the subtitle, "There is Hope"), an opera in three acts translated from the late Étienne Roda-Gil's French libretto based on the historical subject of the French Revolution. Ça Ira was released as a double CD album, featuring baritone Bryn Terfel, soprano Ying Huang and tenor Paul Groves.

Set during the early French Revolution, the original libretto was co-written in French by Roda-Gil and his wife Nadine Delahaye. Waters had begun rewriting the libretto in English in 1989, and said about the composition: "I've always been a big fan of Beethoven's choral music, Berlioz and Borodin ... This is unashamedly romantic and resides in that early 19th-century tradition, because that's where my tastes lie in classical and choral music."

Waters appeared on television to discuss the opera, but the interviews often focused on his relationship with Pink Floyd, something Waters would "take in stride", a sign Pink Floyd biographer Mark Blake believes is "a testament to his mellower old age or twenty years of dedicated psychotherapy". Ça Ira reached number 5 on the Billboard Classical Music Chart in the United States.

=== 2006–2009: The Dark Side of the Moon Live ===
In June 2006, Waters began the two-year Dark Side of the Moon Live world tour. The first half of the show featured both Pink Floyd songs and Waters's solo material; the second included a complete performance of The Dark Side of the Moon, the first time in more than three decades that Waters had performed it. The shows ended with an encore from the third side of The Wall. The elaborate staging, by the concert lighting designer Marc Brickman, included laser lights, fog machines, pyrotechnics, psychedelic projections, and inflatable floating puppets (Spaceman and Pig) controlled by a "handler" dressed as a butcher, and a full 360-degree quadraphonic sound system. Mason joined Waters for the Dark Side of the Moon set and the encores on some 2006 performances.

In March 2007, the Waters song "Hello (I Love You)" featured in the science fiction film The Last Mimzy. Waters released it as a single, on CD and via download, and described it as "a song that captures the themes of the movie, the clash between humanity's best and worst instincts, and how a child's innocence can win the day". He performed at California's Coachella Festival in April 2008 and was to be among the headlining artists at Live Earth 2008 in Mumbai, India, in December 2008, but the concert was cancelled following the 26 November terrorist attacks in Mumbai. In April 2008, Waters discussed a possible new album with the tentative name Heartland.

=== 2010s: The Wall Live and Is This the Life We Really Want? ===
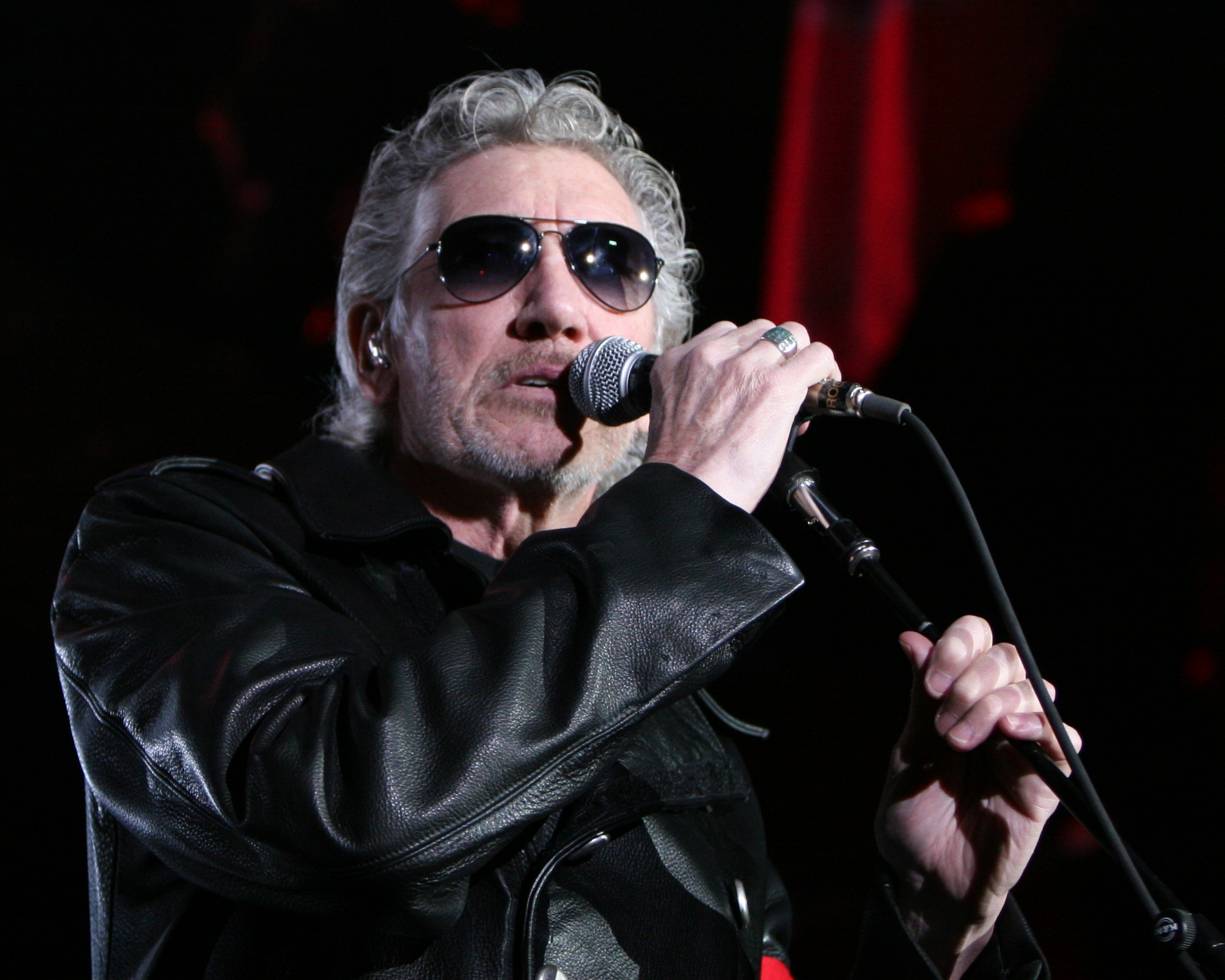
Waters in Barcelona during The Wall Live in 2011

In June 2010, Waters released a cover of "We Shall Overcome", a protest song rewritten and arranged by Guy Carawan and Pete Seeger. He performed with Gilmour at the Hoping Foundation Benefit Evening in July 2010. The set comprised a cover of the Phil Spector song "To Know Him Is to Love Him", which was played in early Pink Floyd soundchecks, followed by "Wish You Were Here", "Comfortably Numb", and "Another Brick in the Wall (Part Two)".

In September 2010, Waters began the Wall Live tour, an updated version of the original Pink Floyd tour, featuring a complete performance of The Wall. At the O2 Arena in London on 12 May 2011, Gilmour and Mason again performed with Waters on "Comfortably Numb", and "Outside the Wall". For the first half of 2012, the tour topped worldwide concert ticket sales, having sold more than 1.4 million tickets globally. By 2013, the Wall Live had become the highest-grossing tour by a solo artist. Waters performed at the Concert for Sandy Relief at Madison Square Garden on 12 December 2012. On 24 July 2015, he headlined the Newport Folk Festival in Newport, Rhode Island, accompanied by the band My Morning Jacket and two singers from the group Lucius. Waters performed at the Desert Trip festival in October 2016.

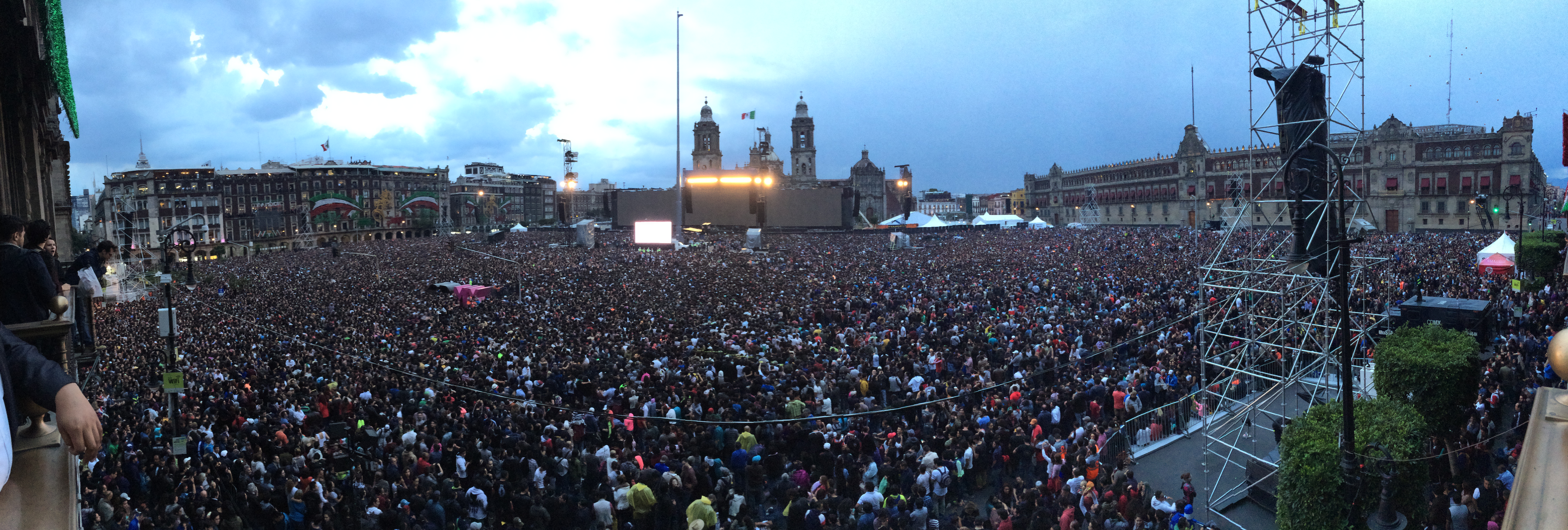
Waters performed a series of concerts in Mexico City in October 2016.

Waters released his first solo album in nearly 25 years, Is This the Life We Really Want?, on 2 June 2017. It was produced by the Radiohead producer Nigel Godrich. Godrich was a fan of Waters's work with Pink Floyd, but was critical of his solo work and encouraged him to make a concise album showcasing his lyrics. Waters returned to North America in 2017 with the Us + Them Tour, performing Pink Floyd and solo material.

On 26 October 2018, Sony Classical Masterworks released an adaptation of Igor Stravinsky's theatrical work The Soldier's Tale narrated by Waters. On 18 April 2019, Waters joined Nick Mason's Saucerful of Secrets on stage at the Beacon Theatre to sing "Set the Controls for the Heart of the Sun". Waters was one of the ten highest-grossing concert acts of the decade.

=== 2020s: This is Not a Drill, Pink Floyd disputes and The Dark Side of the Moon Redux ===
In January 2020, Waters announced a new arena tour, This Is Not a Drill, that would tour North America and finish one month before the 2020 presidential election. The tour was rescheduled to 2022 due to the COVID-19 pandemic. The concerts were held from July to October 2022, and expanded with dates in Europe from March to June 2023. In 2021, Waters said he had begun writing a memoir during the pandemic. In December 2022, he released an EP, The Lockdown Sessions, comprising six new versions of songs from his solo career and Pink Floyd.

Waters continued to quarrel with Gilmour. In 2021, Waters wrote publicly of their disputes over Pink Floyd reissues and credits, accusing Gilmour of distorting the truth, and complained that Gilmour would not allow him to use Pink Floyd's website and social media channels. Rolling Stone noted that Waters and Gilmour had "hit yet another low point in their relationship".

Early in 2023, Waters gave an interview in which he criticised Pink Floyd's 2022 track "Hey, Hey, Rise Up!", which was released in support of Ukraine. Polly Samson, the wife of Gilmour and a lyricist for Pink Floyd, subsequently wrote on Twitter that Waters was antisemitic and "a lying, thieving, hypocritical, tax-avoiding, lip-synching, misogynistic, sick-with-envy megalomaniac". Gilmour replied on Twitter: "Every word demonstrably true." Waters released a statement saying he was aware of the "incendiary and wildly inaccurate" comments and was "taking advice as to his position". Asked by Piers Morgan to respond, Waters said: "No comment. Oh, shut up ... They're public, and I'm private."

For the 50th anniversary of The Dark Side of the Moon, Waters recorded a new version, The Dark Side of the Moon Redux, released on 6 October 2023. It features spoken-word sections and no guitar solos, to "bring out the heart and soul of the album musically and spiritually". In a press release, Waters wrote: "Dave, Rick, Nick, and I were so young when we made [the original], and when you look at the world around us, clearly the message hasn't stuck. That's why I started to consider what the wisdom of an 80 year old could bring to a reimagined version." In October, Waters held two concerts at the London Palladium, where he performed The Dark Side of the Moon Redux, spoke on topics such as Julian Assange and read from his unpublished memoir.

== Political views and activism ==
=== Israeli–Palestinian conflict and accusations of antisemitism ===
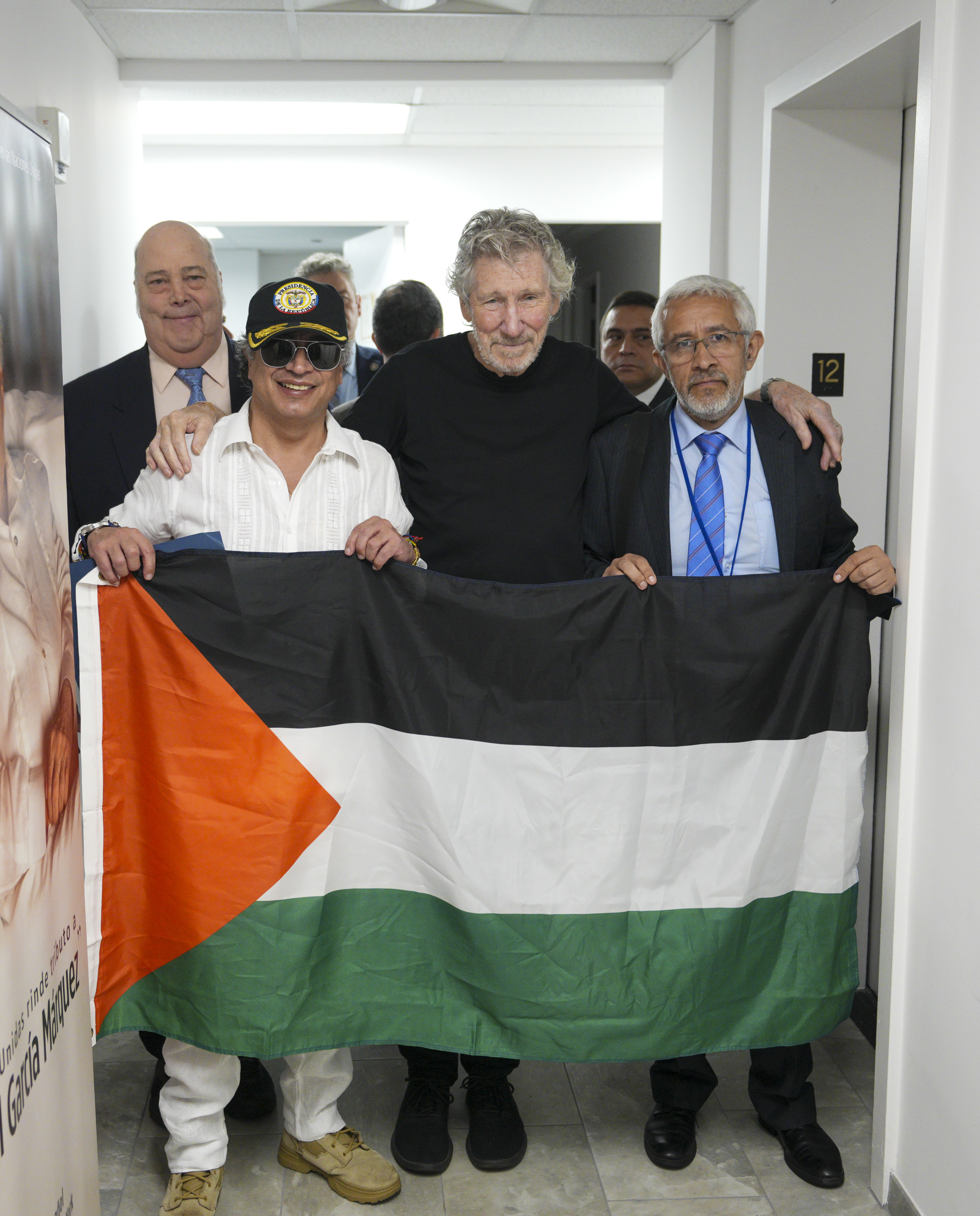
Waters with the Palestinian flag, alongside Colombian president Gustavo Petro, in New York

Waters is a vocal supporter of Palestine in the Israeli–Palestinian conflict. He is a member of Boycott, Divestment and Sanctions (BDS), a campaign for an international boycott of Israel. Waters first saw the West Bank barrier in 2006, at the request of Palestinian supporters, when he was scheduled to perform in Tel Aviv. He subsequently moved a Tel Aviv concert to Neve Shalom and called for the barrier's removal: "The wall is an appalling edifice to behold. It is policed by young Israeli soldiers who treated me, a casual observer from another world, with disdainful aggression." He has repeatedly described Israel's treatment of Palestinians as apartheid. In 2023, he was one of the principal signers of an open letter called Artists Against Apartheid.

Waters has criticised numerous other artists who have performed in Israel. In 2015, Waters published an open letter in Salon criticising the rock band Bon Jovi for performing in Tel Aviv. In 2017, he urged Radiohead to cancel a concert there, signing a letter with 50 others, and was co-signatory on an open letter asking Nick Cave to cancel his. Neither Radiohead nor Cave cancelled their concerts. Waters narrated a 2016 documentary, The Occupation of the American Mind: Israel's Public Relations War in the United States, about the methods they claim are used by Israel to shape American public opinion.

In 2013, Rabbi Abraham Cooper, the associate dean of the Jewish human rights organisation the Simon Wiesenthal Center, accused Waters of antisemitism for including a giant pig balloon bearing a Star of David in his concerts. Waters responded that it was one of several religious and political symbols in the show and not an attempt to single out Judaism as an evil force.

In December 2013, in an interview in CounterPunch, Waters compared the Israeli treatment of Palestinians to Nazi Germany, saying: "The parallels with what went on in the 1930s in Germany are so crushingly obvious." He said the reason why few celebrities had joined the BDS movement in the United States was because "the Jewish lobby is extraordinary powerful here and particularly in the industry that I work in, the music industry". The Anti-Defamation League charged that Waters's remarks were antisemitic. The American rabbi Shmuley Boteach responded to Waters in the New York Observer: "That you would have the audacity to compare Jews to monsters who murdered them shows you have no decency, you have no heart, you have no soul." Speaking in New York afterwards, Waters said supporters of Israel often attack critics as antisemitic as a "diversionary tactic" by conflating anti-Zionism with antisemitism.

In a 2017 interview with Omar Barghouti, Waters again likened Israel's public diplomacy to Nazi Germany: "The thing about propaganda—again, it's not hard to go back to Goebbels or the 1930s. You understand the tactic is to tell the big lie as often as possible over and over and over and over again. And people believe it." In 2017, the investigative journalist and filmmaker Ian Halperin produced a documentary, Wish You Weren't Here, accusing Waters of antisemitism and "erecting the very walls that hinder peace in the region and fuel hatred".

In 2020, Major League Baseball stopped advertising Waters's This Is Not a Drill concerts after receiving criticism from Jewish advocacy groups. Later that year, Waters said the American Jewish businessman and Republican Party donor Sheldon Adelson was a "puppet master" controlling American politics. He said Adelson believed that "only Jewish people are completely human ... I'm not saying Jewish people believe this. I am saying that he does, and he is pulling the strings." In the same interview, Waters said that the murder of George Floyd was carried out with a technique developed by the Israeli Defence Forces. He said the Americans had studied the technique to learn "how to murder the blacks because they have seen how efficient the Israelis have been at murdering Palestinians in the occupied territories by using those techniques ... The Israelis are proud of it." In January 2024, the BMG music company cancelled a publishing agreement with Waters over his comments on Israel, Ukraine and the United States.

In a February 2024 interview with Al Jazeera, Waters criticised the U2 singer Bono for dedicating a performance of "Pride (In the Name of Love)" to those killed in the 2023 Nova music festival massacre. Bono changed the lyrics, written about Martin Luther King, from "Free at last/They took your life" to "Stars of David/They took your life". Waters said it was "so disgusting and degrading when you stand up for the Zionist entity ... [It] was one of the most disgusting things I've ever seen in my life."

In June 2024, Waters criticised the Labour Party leader, Keir Starmer, for his stance on the Gaza war and a ceasefire in the Gaza Strip, and performed at a pro-Palestine concert in London with Cat Stevens and Lowkey. In the following month, Waters engaged in heated debate with Piers Morgan on Piers Morgan Uncensored, arguing that there was no evidence of sexual assault by the Palestinian organisation Hamas, that Israel targeted its own citizens in false flag operations, and that Palestinians had a right to "fight back against the oppressor". At the UK general election that month, Waters endorsed Andrew Feinstein, an independent pro-Palestine candidate who stood against Starmer in the constituency of Holborn and St Pancras.

==== Fascist imagery and German police investigation ====
On 25 February 2023, the German city of Frankfurt cancelled one of Waters's scheduled shows, calling him one of the "most widely known antisemites" and citing his support for BDS, the imagery at his shows and his talks with Hamas. The move was supported by the Central Council of Jews in Germany and the Frankfurt Jewish Community. Waters hired a German law firm to challenge the concert cancellation, and released a statement denying the accusations and stating that the cancellation could have "serious, far-reaching consequences for artists and activists all over the world". A German court overturned the cancellation, saying the concert should be viewed as a work of art and that it "did not glorify or relativise the crimes of the Nazis or identify with Nazi racist ideology".

That May, German police opened a criminal investigation into Waters and the Nazi-style uniform he wore during his Berlin performance for possible incitement. Nazi symbolism is banned in Germany, with exemptions for educational and artistic purposes. Waters has long used similar uniforms for performances of The Wall, in which the protagonist hallucinates himself as a fascist dictator. Israel's Foreign Ministry criticised Waters for his performance. The US Department of State called it "deeply offensive to Jewish people" and accused Waters of having a record of using antisemitic tropes. In the UK, Starmer and the secretary of state, Michael Gove, issued statements condemning him.

Waters said the use of fascist imagery was a statement in "opposition to fascism, injustice and bigotry". He pointed out that he had been using Nazi-inspired uniforms in performances since 1980, but they had only recently attracted controversy. Waters felt the criticism was disingenuous and politically motivated, and that he had been attacked at the behest of the "Israeli lobby" in Germany. In an interview with Double Down News, Waters said the accusations of antisemitism were a "vicious lie" and "deeply insulting", and that he was a victim of cancel culture. He said that the Israeli government was attempting to discredit him as they saw him as an "existential threat to their settler-colonialist, racist, apartheid regime".

In May 2023, the Labour MP Christian Wakeford criticised Waters's shows in the UK parliament. Waters responded at a concert in London the following month, calling Wakeford a "fucking moron" and a "cripple", which Variety said "drew a sharp intake of breath" from some in attendance. Waters also said he was "pissed off with this Israeli lobby bullshit" and accused critics of "making up stuff because you've been told to by your masters from the Foreign Office in Tel Aviv".

==== 2023 documentary alleging antisemitism ====
In September 2023, a documentary alleging antisemitism by Waters, The Dark Side of Roger Waters, directed by John Ware, was released by the British group Campaign Against Antisemitism. It includes accounts from Waters's past collaborators, including the Wall producer Bob Ezrin, who say Waters made offensive remarks about Jewish people. In a separate statement, Ezrin said he did not object to Waters's challenging Israeli policy, but that "if your language directly or by implication promotes the eradication of the world's only Jewish state, then that is absolutely antisemitism in my book". Waters responded in a statement that he was "frequently mouthy and prone to irreverence" but not antisemitic, and that the film misrepresented his views. The documentary also included allegations by Waters's former saxophonist Norbert Stachel that Waters referred to vegetarian food as "Jew food" and mocked Stachel's grandmother, who had been murdered in the Holocaust.

According to the documentary, in a 2010 email to his crew, Waters described his idea for the inflatable pig to be floated above his gigs, which would have the words "dirty kyke", "follow the money" and "Scum" written on it. In response, Waters said that the "offensive words I referenced... were my brainstorming ideas on how to make the evils and horrors of fascism and extremism apparent", and "not the manifestation of any underlying bigotry as the film suggests".

Ware sued Waters and Al Jazeera Media Network for libel over comments Waters made in a February 2024 interview on Al Jazeera, including calling Ware a "lying, conniving Zionist mouthpiece" and accusing him of "cheerleading the genocide of the Palestinian people". On 25 February 2025, Mrs Justice Eady ruled on preliminary issues of meaning, finding that the statements complained of were defamatory at common law, and that Waters's descriptions of Ware as "cheerleading" genocide and as being among the "pro-genociders" would be understood as statements of fact that Ware positively supported genocide. The case was allowed to proceed.

==== Hotel cancellations ====
Waters said in an interview with Glenn Greenwald that the October 7 attacks may have been a false flag operation and that "resistance to the Israeli occupation" is legally and morally justifiable. In November 2023, after the interview with Greenwald, the Faena Hotel and the Alvear Palace Hotel in Buenos Aires cancelled Waters reservations without giving a reason. Several Argentine deputies repudiated Waters's visit to their country.

The Hyatt Centric and the Regency Hotels in Montevideo denied Waters accommodation based on the right of admission. Felipe Schipani, a Colorado Party National Representative, asked the Municipality of Montevideo to withdraw the "illustrious visitor to Montevideo" title given to Waters in 2018.

=== Russian invasion of Ukraine ===
A week before the Russian invasion of Ukraine in February 2022, Waters told an RT interviewer that rumours of Russia launching an invasion were "bullshit" and Russophobic propaganda. After the invasion, Waters said that the US President Joe Biden was "fuelling the fire in the Ukraine... that is a huge crime", and questioned why the US was not encouraging Ukraine "to negotiate, obviating the need for this horrific, horrendous war". Responding to accusations that he was placing the responsibility to negotiate on the country that was invaded, Waters said that Russia was responding to provocations from NATO: "This war is basically about the action and reaction of NATO pushing right up to the Russian border—which they promised they wouldn't do." In another interview, Waters said the attack on Ukraine was "probably the most provoked invasion ever" and he refused to "see Russia from the current Russo-phobic perspective".

On 5 September 2022, Waters published an open letter to Olena Zelenska, the First Lady of Ukraine. He accused Ukrainian "extreme nationalists" of starting the war and made no mention of Russia's responsibility for the invasion. He argued that the West should not provide Ukraine with weapons, and that Western governments were prolonging the war with their support. Waters urged her husband, the Ukrainian president Volodymyr Zelenskyy, to end the war based on the Minsk agreements. Waters's This Is Not a Drill concerts in Poland were cancelled following local outrage over his comments.

In a February 2023 interview in The Daily Telegraph, Waters echoed Russian propaganda by saying "Nazis" are "in control of the government" of Ukraine. Waters further said that "the Ukraine is a deeply divided country. In fact, it's not really a country at all, it's only been there since Khrushchev, 1956. So it's a patchy sort of vague experiment". He once called Vladimir Putin a gangster but, after listening to a podcast linked to the anti-NATO hacking group Ghostwriter, Waters felt he "may be leading his country to the benefit of all of the people of Russia". Waters's former bandmate David Gilmour and his wife Polly Samson responded by calling him a "Putin apologist". On 8 February, Waters gave a speech to the United Nations Security Council at the Russian government's behest. He condemned the invasion of Ukraine as illegal, but said it was "not unprovoked" and also "condemned the provocateurs" and called for a ceasefire. Waters was praised by Russia's deputy UN ambassador, Dmitry Polyanskiy. Ukraine's UN ambassador, Sergiy Kyslytsya, denounced Waters as "another brick in the wall" of Russian "disinformation and propaganda".

In February 2025, Waters made another speech to the United Nations Security Council, which was requested by Russia for the tenth anniversary of the signing of the Minsk II agreement. Waters accused Zelenskyy of abandoning the Minsk agreements, in breach of his election promise, and accused the former UK prime minister Boris Johnson of acting for the US to stop peace talks.

=== Other views ===
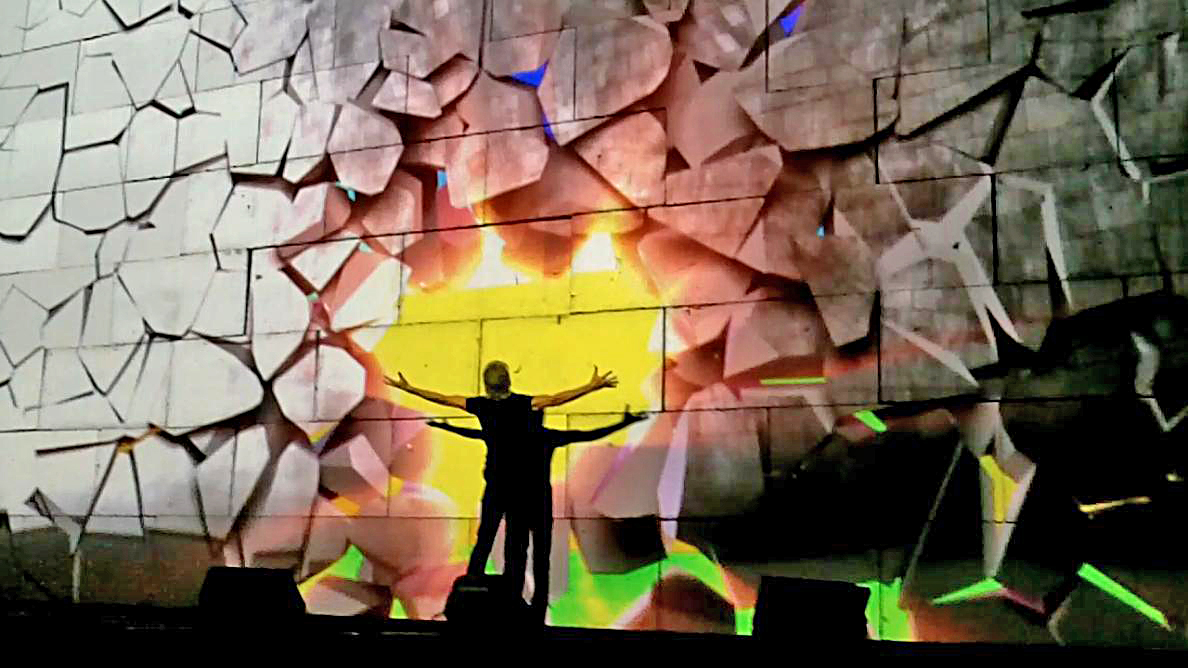
Waters performing "Comfortably Numb" during The Wall Live in Kansas City, 30 October 2010

Waters supported the Countryside Alliance and opposed the Hunting Act of 2004, calling it "a terrible piece of legislation". He joined a march of 100,000 people in opposition to it at Hyde Park. Waters said that whether or not he supported hunting, it was important to defend it as a right.

In 2007, Waters became a spokesman for Millennium Promise, a non-profit organisation fighting poverty and malaria. That July, he participated in the American leg of the Live Earth concert, aimed at raising awareness about global climate change.

In 2015, Waters said that socialism was "a good thing", and called for socialised healthcare in the United States. He endorsed the Labour leader Jeremy Corbyn in the 2019 UK general election, describing him as a "beacon of hope". In 2023, Tanya Gold wrote for UnHerd that "Waters believes that a Jewish conspiracy overthrew Jeremy Corbyn, fixed the result of the 2019 general election, and controls Keir Starmer". This was a reference to comments he made that year that numerous media outlets had been trying to destroy him for his support of human rights in Palestine. Waters had said: "They’re trying to cancel me like they cancelled Jeremy Corbyn and Julian Assange. I will not be cancelled."

Waters is supportive of veterans, which he partly attributes to the death of his father in World War II. He allocates a block of tickets for veterans at his shows. For a few years he performed with a group of wounded veterans that was arranged through the United States National Military Medical Center. In 2012, he led a benefit for United States military veterans, Stand Up for Heroes, and invited a group of combat-wounded veterans, MusiCorps, to perform with him.

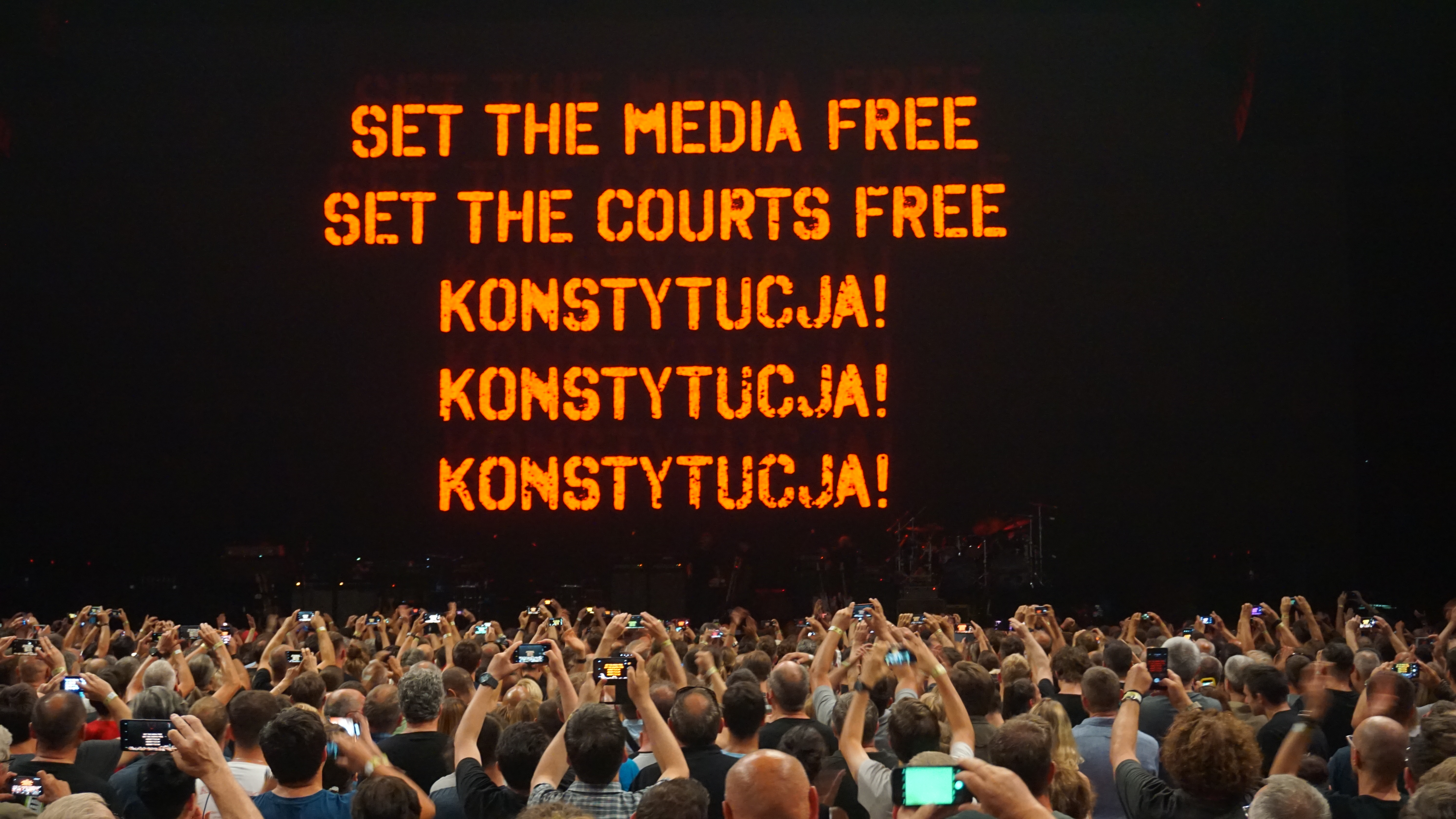
Waters performing in Gdańsk in August 2018 during the Us + Them Tour, criticising the Polish government's treatment of the courts and media.

Waters opposed Brexit. Following the June 2016 referendum, he said: "I thought we were better than that. I was wrong." After the April 2018 Douma chemical attack carried out by the Syrian government, Waters called civil defence volunteers, the White Helmets, "a fake organisation that exists only to create propaganda for the jihadists and terrorists" trying to incite the West to "start dropping bombs on people in Syria".

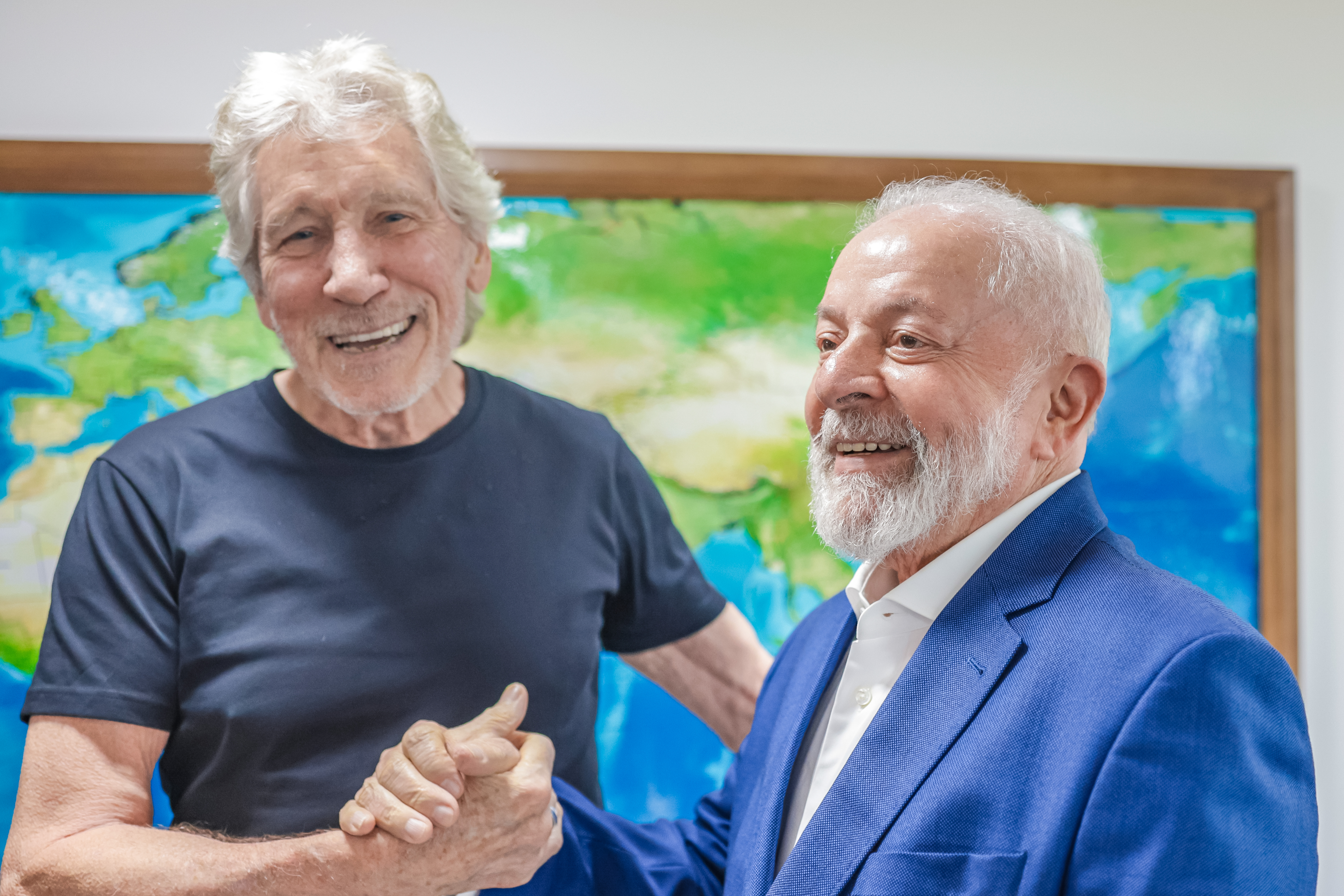
Waters and Lula da Silva in 2023

In 2018, Waters included the Brazilian far-right presidential candidate Jair Bolsonaro in a list of "neo-fascists" displayed on a screen at his concert in São Paulo, which drew mixed responses from the crowd. In a concert in Rio de Janeiro that October, he acknowledged the murdered Brazilian councilwoman Marielle Franco and brought her daughter, sister and widow on stage. In an interview with the online music magazine BrooklynVegan, he said he tried to visit the progressive politician Lula da Silva, who was imprisoned on corruption charges; Waters said "the only reason Lula is in prison is because he would have won the election".

In 2019, Waters spoke at a rally outside the Home Office calling for the release of the WikiLeaks founder Julian Assange, and dedicated a performance of "Wish You Were Here" to him. The following year, he spoke at a rally in support of Assange outside Parliament in London. Waters also supports Steven Donziger, an American lawyer embroiled in environmental litigation against Chevron Corporation, and has funded some of his legal fees.

Waters showed his support for the 2019–2022 Chilean protests through a video from POUSTA.com. In an interview with Camila Vallejo of the Communist Party of Chile, he condemned the country's president, Sebastian Piñera, calling him a "rat", and said the 2022 Chilean constitutional referendum was "extraordinarily revolutionary".

In 2017, Waters criticised the US president Donald Trump and his policies. He condemned Trump's plan to build a wall separating the US and Mexico, drawing parallels to The Wall. During his 2022 This Is Not a Drill concert series, the performance of "The Bravery of Being Out of Range" saw every US president from Ronald Reagan to Trump labelled a war criminal, with a message displayed that Joe Biden was "just getting started".

In a 2022 interview with Michael Smerconish, Waters said that Taiwan was part of China and that this had been "absolutely accepted by the whole of the international community since 1948". In February 2024, Waters said that the former prime minister of Pakistan, Imran Khan, had been falsely imprisoned, and called for his release so that he could lead the PTI in "a new fair and transparent election" to elect a government which "represents the will of the people of Pakistan" and not "foreign and domestic oligarchs." Waters endorsed the Venezuelan president Nicolás Maduro for the 2024 Venezuelan presidential election, calling the main Venezuelan opposition candidate, Edmundo González Urrutia, a "sockpuppet" of the US government. Appearing on The Tucker Carlson Show in July 2026, Waters advanced the conspiracy theory that the World Trade Center was destroyed in a controlled demolition.

== Artistry ==
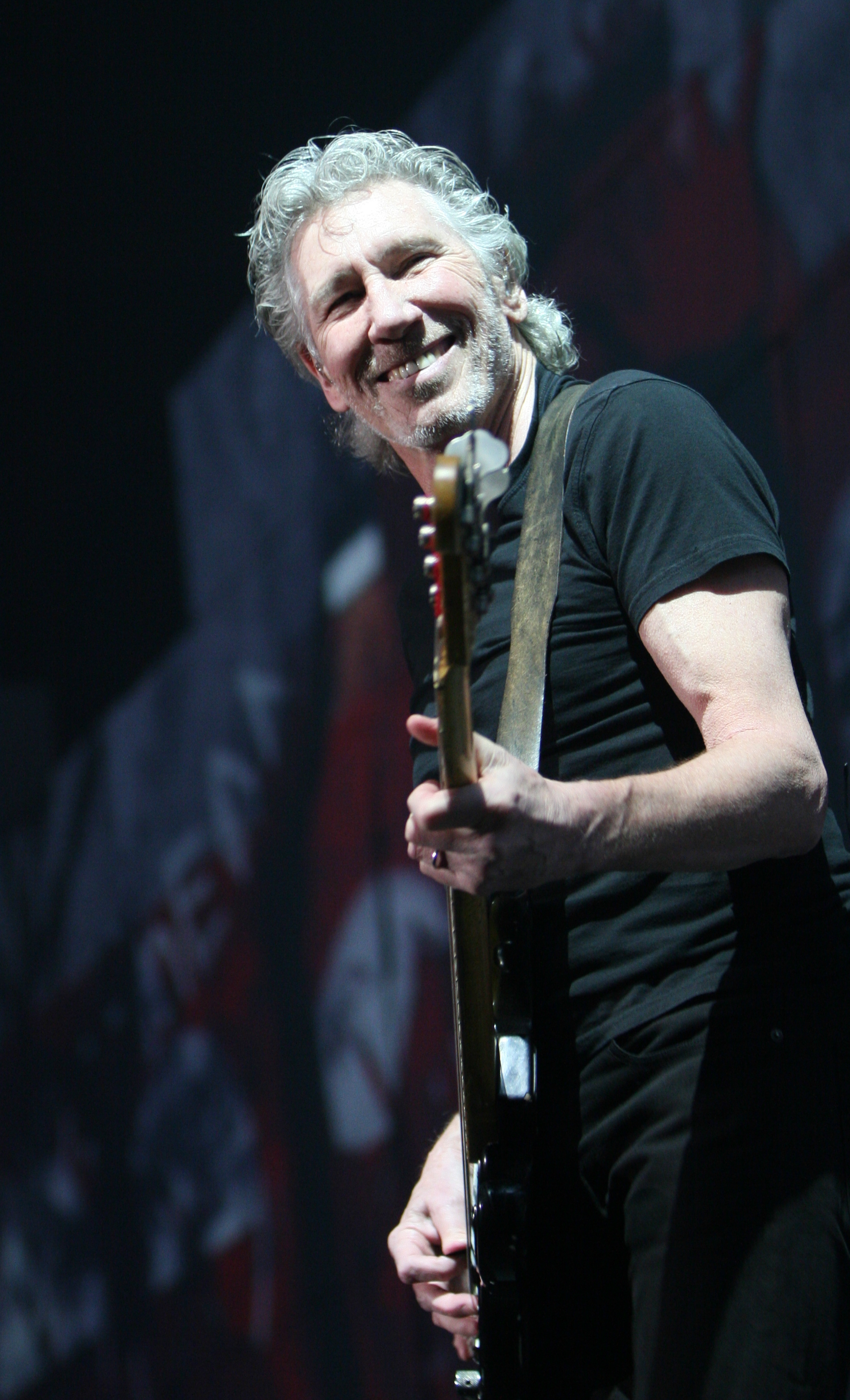
Waters in Barcelona during The Wall Live, 5 April 2011

Waters's primary instrument in Pink Floyd was the bass guitar. However, he said in 1992 that he was "never a bass player" and had never been interested in playing musical instruments. Gilmour said he, not Waters, had played many bass parts on Pink Floyd records, and that Waters had not been interested in improving. According to Mason in 2018, Waters feels that "everything should be judged on the writing rather than the playing". Guy Pratt, who has played bass with Pink Floyd and Gilmour since Waters's departure, said he said he viewed Waters more as Pink Floyd's "grand conceptualist" than their bassist.

Waters briefly played a Höfner bass, but replaced it with a Rickenbacker RM-1999/4001S. In 1970, it was stolen along with the rest of Pink Floyd's equipment in New Orleans. He began using Fender Precision Basses in 1968, originally alongside the Rickenbacker 4001, and then exclusively after the Rickenbacker was lost in 1970. First seen at a concert in Hyde Park, London, in July 1970, the black P-Bass was rarely used until April 1972, when it became his main stage guitar. On 2 October 2010, it became the basis for a Fender Artist Signature model.

Waters endorses Rotosound Jazz Bass 77 flat-wound strings. He has used Selmer, WEM, Hiwatt, and Ashdown amplifiers but used Ampeg for later tours. He has employed delay, tremolo, chorus, stereo panning and phaser effects.

Waters experimented with the EMS Synthi A and VCS 3 synthesisers on Pink Floyd pieces such as "On the Run", "Welcome to the Machine", and "In the Flesh?" He played electric and acoustic guitar on Pink Floyd tracks using Fender, Martin, Ovation and Washburn guitars. He played electric guitar on the Pink Floyd song "Sheep", from Animals, and acoustic guitar on several Pink Floyd recordings, such as "Pigs on the Wing 1 & 2", also from Animals, "Southampton Dock" from The Final Cut, and on "Mother" from The Wall. A Binson Echorec 2 delay effect was used on his bass lead track "One of These Days". Waters plays trumpet during concert performances of "Outside the Wall".

The Pink Floyd critic Mike Cormack wrote that Waters is "surely the greatest lyricist in all of rock music", citing the use of trochaic tetrameter in the refrain of "Time" and the "exquisite phrasing" of "Your Possible Pasts". He wrote that the lyrics of "Comfortably Numb" were "the greatest ever in rock music".

== Personal life ==
Waters has been married five times. In 1969, he married his childhood sweetheart, Judith Trim, a schoolteacher and potter. She was featured on the gatefold sleeve of the original release of the Pink Floyd album Ummagumma, but her image was excised from CD reissues. They had no children and divorced in 1975. Trim died in 2001. In 1976, Waters married Carolyne Christie, the niece of the third Marquess of Zetland. They had a son, Harry Waters, who has played keyboards with Waters's touring band since 2002, and a daughter, India Waters, who has worked as a model. Christie and Waters divorced in 1992. In 1993, Waters married Priscilla Phillips. They had a son, Jack Fletcher. Their marriage ended in 2001. In 2004, Waters became engaged to the actress and filmmaker Laurie Durning. They married on 14 January 2012 and filed for divorce in September 2015. Waters married his driver Kamilah Chavis in October 2021 and filed for divorce in November 2026. Waters has homes in Long Island in New York and Hampshire in England. He is an atheist.

== Discography ==
=== Core catalogue ===
Solo albums

- The Pros and Cons of Hitch Hiking (1984)
- Radio K.A.O.S. (1987)
- Amused to Death (1992)
- Is This the Life We Really Want? (2017)

Soundtracks

- Music from The Body (with Ron Geesin) (1970)
- When the Wind Blows (1986)

Re-recordings

- The Lockdown Sessions (2022)
- The Dark Side of the Moon Redux (2023)

Classical

- Ça Ira (2005)
- Igor Stravinsky's The Soldier's Tale (2018)

== Tours ==
- The Pros and Cons of Hitch Hiking (1984–1985)
- K.A.O.S. On the Road (1987)
- In the Flesh (1999–2002)
- The Dark Side of the Moon Live (2006–2008)
- The Wall Live (2010–2013)
- Us + Them Tour (2017–2018)
- This Is Not a Drill (2022–2023)

== Live band members ==
=== Current members ===
- Roger Waters – lead vocals, bass guitar, rhythm guitars, piano (1984–present)
- Jon Carin – piano, keyboards, programming, lap steel guitar, rhythm guitars, vocals (1999–2000, 2006–present)
- Dave Kilminster – lead guitars, talk box, vocals (2006–present); additional bass guitar (2006–2013)
- Gus Seyffert – rhythm guitars, bass guitar, backing vocals (2017–present)
- Jonathan Wilson – lead and rhythm guitars, vocals (2017–present)
- Joey Waronker – drums, percussion (2017–present)
- Robert Walter – organ, keyboards (2022–present)
- Shanay Johnson – backing vocals (2022–present)
- Amanda Belair – backing vocals (2022–present)
- Seamus Blake – saxophone (2022–present)

== General and cited sources ==
- Blake, Mark (2008). Comfortably Numb: The Inside Story of Pink Floyd (1st US paperback ed.). Da Capo Press. ISBN 978-0-306-81752-6.
- Cormack, Mike (2024). Everything Under The Sun: The Complete Guide To Pink Floyd. The History Press. ISBN 978-1803995359.
- Fitch, Vernon (2005). The Pink Floyd Encyclopedia (third ed.). Collector's Guide Publishing, Inc. ISBN 978-1-894959-24-7.
- Fitch, Vernon; Mahon, Richard (2006). Comfortably Numb: A History of "The Wall" – Pink Floyd 1978–1981 (1st ed.). PFA Publishing. ISBN 978-0-9777366-0-7.
- Fricke, David (December 2009). "Roger Waters: Welcome to My Nightmare ... Behind The Wall". Mojo. Vol. 193. pp. 68–84.
- Mabbett, Andy (2010). Pink Floyd – The Music and the Mystery (1st UK paperback ed.). Omnibus Press. ISBN 978-1-84938-370-7.
- Manning, Toby (2006). The Rough Guide to Pink Floyd (1st US paperback ed.). Rough Guides Ltd. ISBN 978-1-84353-575-1.
- Mason, Nick (2005). Inside Out: A Personal History of Pink Floyd (1st US paperback ed.). Chronicle Books. ISBN 978-0-8118-4824-4.
- Povey, Glen (2008). Echoes: The Complete History of Pink Floyd (2nd UK paperback ed.). 3C Publishing Ltd. ISBN 978-0-9554624-1-2.
- Povey, Glen; Russell, Ian (1997). Pink Floyd: In the Flesh: The Complete Performance History (1st US paperback ed.). St. Martin's Press. ISBN 978-0-9554624-0-5.
- Schaffner, Nicholas (1991). Saucerful of Secrets: the Pink Floyd Odyssey (1st US paperback ed.). Dell Publishing. ISBN 978-0-385-30684-3.
- Thompson, Dave (2013). Roger Waters: The Man Behind the Wall. Backbeat Books. ISBN 978-1-61713-564-4.
- Watkinson, Mike; Anderson, Pete (1991). Crazy Diamond: Syd Barrett & the Dawn of Pink Floyd (1st UK paperback ed.). Omnibus Press. ISBN 978-1-84609-739-3.
