= TraumaMan =

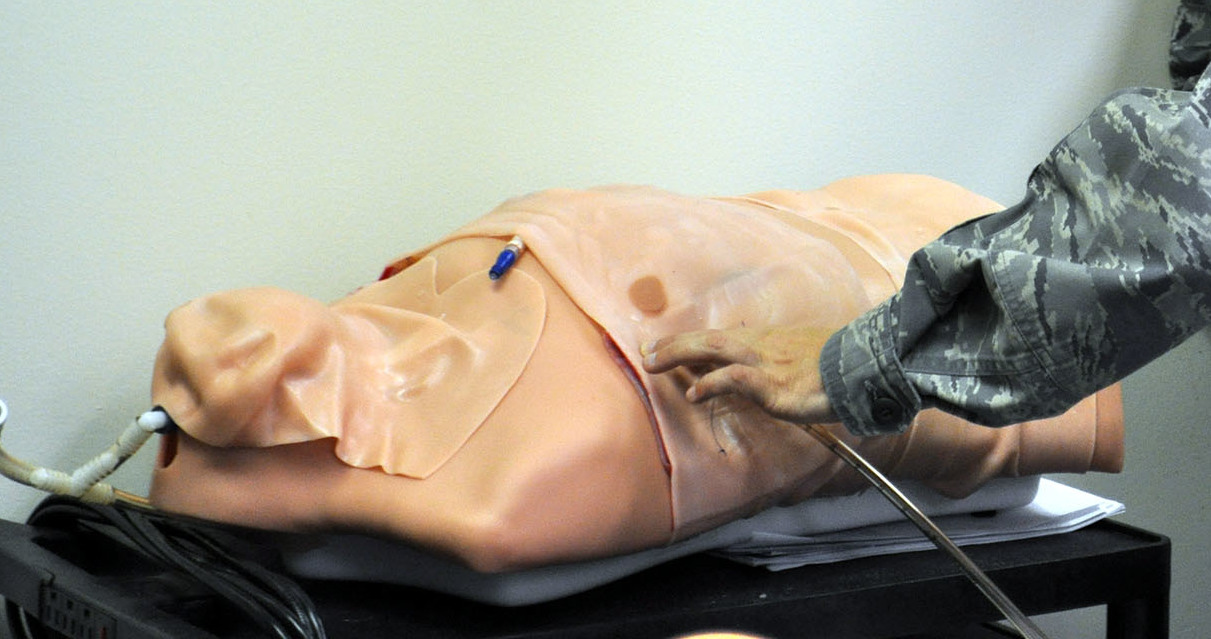

TraumaMan is a surgical simulation manikin used for teaching surgical skills, including the American College of Surgeons' Advanced Trauma Life Support (ATLS) program, to medical professionals. TraumaMan is also used to advance surgical skills in combat situations.

The TraumaMan surgical trainer has become a preferred alternative to the use of animals by both medical students and instructors alike for teaching emergency trauma surgical skills.

TraumaMan is used to train on the following surgical procedures

- Cricothyroidotomy
- Percutaneous tracheostomy
- Needle decompression
- Chest tube insertion
- Pericardiocentesis
- Diagnostic peritoneal lavage
- Intravenous cutdown
