= Roy Battersby =

British television director (1936–2024)

- Born: Roy John Battersby; 20 April 1936; Willesden, London, England
- Died: 10 January 2024 (aged 87); Los Angeles, California, U.S.
- Occupation: Television director
- Spouse: Judy Loe (m. 1997)
- Children: 5
- Relatives: Kate Beckinsale (step-daughter)

Roy John Battersby (20 April 1936 – 10 January 2024) was a British television director, known for his work in drama productions such as Between The Lines, Inspector Morse, Cracker and A Touch of Frost. Early in his career, he made documentary features for the BBC programmes Tomorrow's World and Towards Tomorrow. In 2005, his film Red Mercury was shown at the Montreal World Film Festival.

Battersby was married to actress Judy Loe and was the stepfather of actress Kate Beckinsale. Battersby was a Trotskyist for some years, becoming a full-time organiser for the now defunct Workers Revolutionary Party. The association had ended by 1981, but the connection led to his being blacklisted by the BBC.

Battersby died after a stroke on 10 January 2024, at the age of 87.

== Filmography ==
| Year | Title | Episodes | Comments |
|---|---|---|---|
| 1969, 1970 | ITV Saturday Night Theatre | Machine | TV play written by Hugh Charteris |
| 1969, 1970 | ITV Saturday Night Theatre | Roll on Four O'Clock | TV play written by Colin Welland |
| 1970 | The Body | | Documentary narrated by Vanessa Redgrave and Frank Finlay |
| 1972 | Home and Away | | |
| 1972–1974 | Play For Today | Better Than The Movies | TV play written by John Elliot and starring Bryan Marshall |
| 1972–1974 | Play For Today | The Operation | TV play written by Roger Smith |
| 1972–1974 | Play For Today | Leeds United | TV play written by Colin Welland and starring Elizabeth Spriggs |
| 1975 | Centre Play | Post Mortem | |
| 1975–1976 | Couples | 9 episodes | |
| 1977 | The Palestinian | | |
| 1981 | A Change in Time | | |
| 1983 | No Excuses | | |
| 1983 | The Home Front | At The Grammar | |
| 1983 | The Home Front | Low Key Lady on High Speed Train | |
| 1983 | The Home Front | The Poodle Strikes Back | |
| 1983 | The Home Front | Walk in My Shoes | |
| 1984 | Winter Flight | | |
| 1986 | King of the Ghetto | 4 episodes | |
| 1986 | Unnatural Causes | Evensong | |
| 1986 | Screenplay | The Act | |
| 1990 | Eurocops | Pushed | Crime drama by Billy Hamon starring John Benfield as Jackson |
| 1990 | Eurocops | Firing the Bullets | Crime drama by Billy Hamon starring John Benfield as Jackson |
| 1990, 1991 | The Play on One | Yellowbacks | |
| 1990, 1991 | The Play on One | Escape From Kampala | |
| 1991 | Inspector Morse | Fat Chance | Crime drama starring John Thaw, Kevin Whately, Maurice Denham and Zoë Wanamaker. |
| 1992–1993 | Between The Lines | Lies and Damned Lies | Crime drama starring Neil Pearson |
| 1992–1993 | Between The Lines | A Watch & Chain of Course | Crime drama starring Neil Pearson |
| 1992–1993 | Between The Lines | Some Must Watch | Crime drama starring Neil Pearson |
| 1992–1993 | Between The Lines | Manoeuvre 11 | Crime drama starring Neil Pearson |
| 1994–2006 | A Touch of Frost | Widows and Orphans | Crime drama starring David Jason |
| 1994–2006 | A Touch of Frost | Quarry | Crime drama starring David Jason |
| 1994–2006 | A Touch of Frost | Dancing in the Dark | Crime drama starring David Jason |
| 1994–2006 | A Touch of Frost | Endangered Species | Crime drama starring David Jason |
| 1994 | Between The Lines | The End User | Crime drama starring Neil Pearson |
| 1995 | Cracker | Brotherly Love | Crime drama starring Robbie Coltrane and Geraldine Somerville |
| 1997 | The Moth | | |
| 1998 | Space Island One | A Child Is Born | |
| 1999 | Doomwatch: Winter Angel | | |
| 2000 | In Defence | 2 episodes | |
| 2005 | Red Mercury | | |

== Awards ==
| Year | Result | Award | Comments |
|---|---|---|---|
| 1996 | Won | BAFTA Alan Clarke award | |
| 2006 | Nominated | Montréal World Film Festival Grand Prix des Amériques | for Red Mercury (2005) |
