= 1840 Birmingham by-election =

UK election

← 1837	23–25 January 1840	1841 →

Constituency of Birmingham
- Registered: 4,619
- Turnout: 51.4% (▼8.5%)
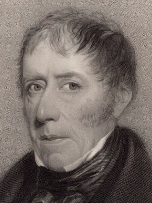
	First party	Second party
	Rad
Candidate	George Muntz	Charles Wetherell
Party	Radical	Conservative
Popular vote	1,458	917
Percentage	61.4%	38.6%
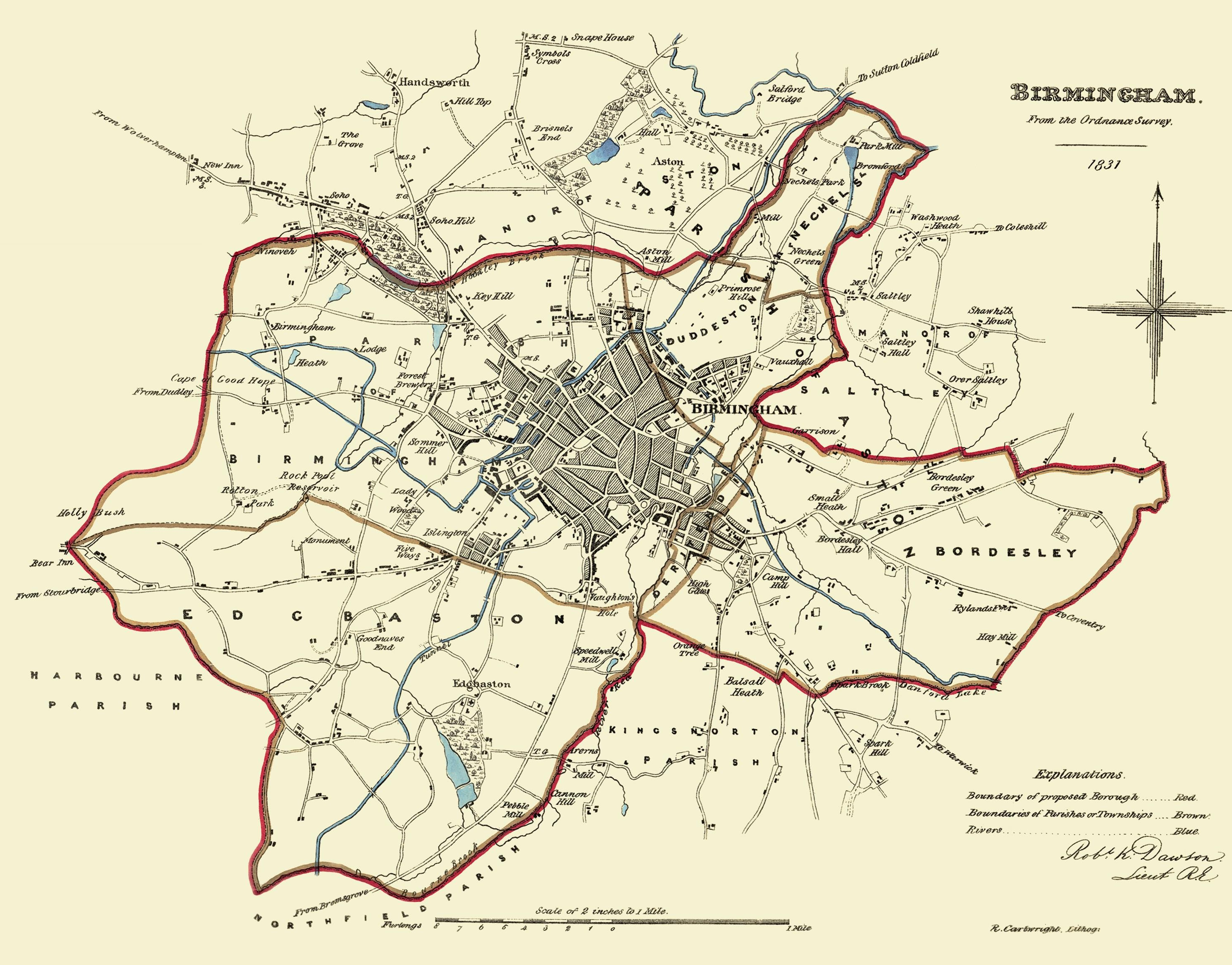
- Map of the constituency of Birmingham at the time of the by-election
MP before election
Thomas Attwood
Radical
Elected MP
George Muntz
Radical

A UK parliamentary by-election was held for one of the two seats in Birmingham on 23–25 January 1840. The Radical candidate George Muntz was returned, ahead of Conservative Charles Wetherell.

== Nominations ==
The vacancy was caused by the 1839 resignation of Thomas Attwood, who was a Radical like the other sitting MP Joshua Scholefield. The returning officer was Philip Henry Muntz, the mayor of Birmingham and brother of George Muntz. Nomination day was fixed as 23 January, and in the runup both George Muntz and another Radical, Joseph Sturge, canvassed and took part in hustings. Sturge said that if he lacked support he would withdraw, to avoid splitting the Radical vote. "Mr. Allen, the Whig" withdrew from the hustings. Wetherell's supporters told the mayor that their candidate, as yet unnamed, intended to run. The mayor consulted the three prospective candidates' representatives and on 22 January the municipal corporation contracted for erection of 15 polling booths. At the nomination meeting all three prospective candidates were proposed and seconded; only Muntz attended in person. There was a show of hands of those present, described by The Spectator:

There was a large show of hands for Mr. Sturge, a much larger for Mr. Muntz, but for Sir Charles Wethereil scarcely a hand in the body of the Hall was held up. Mr. George Edmonds, who proposed Mr. Sturge, then stated, that as the decision of the meeting was against Mr. Sturge, he was authorized to withdraw that gentleman from the contest; and he hoped this proof of Mr. Sturge's magnanimity would have the effect of uniting all the Liberals against the common enemy. The show of hands being pronounced in favour of Muntz, a poll for Wetherell was demanded.

Polling was the following day, 24 January, and the result was announced early on 25 January.

== Result ==
1840 Birmingham by-election
Party	Candidate	Votes	%	±%
Radical	George Muntz	1,458	61.4	−18.8
Conservative	Charles Wetherell	917	38.6	+18.9
Radical	Joseph Sturge	Withdrew	—	
Majority		541	22.8	+2.7
Turnout		2,375	51.4	−8.5
Registered electors		4,619		
Radical hold		Swing	-18.9	

== Muntz v. Sturge ==
The corporation billed each of the three prospective candidates for one-third of the £360 expenses. Sturge paid only the £66 proportion which he judged accrued prior to the commencement of the poll. The mayor sued for the balance, and Nicholas Conyngham Tindal, the Chief Justice of the Common Pleas, agreed at the Warwickshire assizes, but this was overturned on appeal by James Scarlett, 1st Baron Abinger, the Chief Baron of the Exchequer, who ruled that Sturge was not a "candidate at a contested election" in the relevant section of the Reform Act 1832, and thus the other two candidates were liable for the expenses incurred during the poll.
