= Olive (disambiguation) =

Olive is a genus of about 20 species of small trees in the family Oleaceae, and the fruit of those trees.

Olive may also refer to:

== Color ==
- Olive (color), a dark yellowish-green color
- Olive skin, a type of skin color

== Places ==
=== United States ===
- Olive, California
- Olive, Indiana
- Olive, Missouri
- Olive, Montana
- Olive, New York
- Olive, Oklahoma
- Olive, Virginia
- Olive, West Virginia
- Olive Green (disambiguation), two places in Ohio and one in England
- Olive Township (disambiguation), several places in the United States

=== Elsewhere ===
- Olive Island, an island in South Australia
- Mount Olive (disambiguation), various mountains

== People ==
- Olive (given name)
- Olive (surname)
- Olive (martyr) (Blessed Olive), a Catholic martyr from Italy
- Olive, Lady Baillie (1899–1974), Anglo-American heiress, landowner and hostess
- Olive May (disambiguation), several people

== Arts, entertainment, and media ==
=== Fictional characters ===
- Olive, heroine of Olive, the Other Reindeer, an animated Christmas special
- Olive, The Bash St. Kids' school cook
- Olive Doyle, a main character from the show A.N.T. Farm
- Olive, a main character from the show Elinor Wonders Why
- Olive, a character in the animated series Adventure Time: Distant Lands episode "BMO"
- Olive Kitteridge, the title character of a novel by Elizabeth Strout
- Agent Olive, a character from the show Odd Squad in season 1
- Olive Hoover, a main character in the film Little Miss Sunshine
- Olive Oyl, Popeye's girlfriend
- Olive Penderghast, the protagonist of the 2010 film Easy A
- Olive Rozalski, a main character from the 2019 TV show Sydney to the Max
- Olive Rudge, a character from the 1969 TV show On The Buses
- Olive Snook, a character from the 2007 TV show Pushing Daisies
- Olive Stone, a character from the 2018 TV show Manifest
- Olive, a character from the PBS Kids Sprout animated series Justin Time

=== Other uses in arts, entertainment, and media ===
- Olive (band), an English electronic music group
- Olive (film), a 1988 Australian television film
- Olive (food magazine), a British food magazine
- Olive (fashion magazine), a Japanese fashion magazine
- Olive, a 2017 album by Sky-Hi

== Biology ==
=== Plants ===
- Saint Helena olive, a tree in the family Rhamnaceae
- Canarium album (Chinese olive), a tree in the family Burseraceae with fruit resembling mediterranean olives
- Olive leaf, a plant that is used medicinally

=== Animals ===
- Olive baboon, Papio anubis, a species of baboon
- Olive colobus, a species of primate in the family Cercopithecidae
- Olive ibis, a species of bird in the family Threskiornithidae found in parts of Africa
- Olive long-tailed cuckoo, a species of cuckoo in the family Cuculidae
- Olive sparrow, Arremonops rufivirgatus, a species of American sparrow in the family Emberizidae
- Olive thrush, one of the most common members of the thrush family (Turdidae)
- Olive whistler, Pachycephala olivacea, a species of bird of the whistler family Pachycephalidae that is native to southeastern Australia
- Olive woodpecker, a species of bird in the family Picidae, found in parts of Africa
- Olive bee-eater, a species of bird in the family Meropidae, found in parts of Africa
- Olive python, Liasis olivaceus, the second largest Australian python
- Olive snout-burrower, a species of frog in the family Hemisotidae
- Olive snail, a family of medium to large predatory sea snails

== Other uses ==
- Airplane olive, Hong Kong snack
- Olive (1802 ship), launched in Calcutta
- Olivary body, nicknamed the olive, a part of the brain (brainstem)
- Olive, a compression ring used in plumbing
- Mono Olive, a subproject of the Mono project
- Tropical Storm Olive (disambiguation), the name of eleven tropical cyclones
