= Checkland =

Checkland is a surname. Notable people with the name include:

- Francis Checkland (1895–1960), English footballer
- Michael Checkland (born 1936), Director-General of the BBC
- Olive Checkland (1920–2004), English historian and writer
- Peter Checkland (1930–2026), British management scientist and academic
- Sydney Checkland (1916–1986), British-Canadian economic historian
