= Olive (surname) =

Olive is a surname. Notable people with the name include:

- Arturo Ortega Olive, Mexican businessman
- Bobby Olive (born 1969), American football player
- Bruce Olive (1930–2025), Australian rugby league player
- David Olive (1937–2012), British theoretical physicist
- DJ Olive (born 1961), American DJ
- Don Olive (1930–1984), New Zealand racing cyclist
- Fernand Olive (1891-1949), French Army general
- George Olive (1887–1973), Canadian politician
- Gloria Olive (1923–2006), Academic mathematician from New Zealand
- Gordon Olive (1916–1987), Australian air force officer
- Isabelle Olive (born 1960), French athlete
- James Olive (1856–1942), British police commissioner
- Jason Olive (born 1972), American actor
- Jean-Baptiste Olive (1848–1936), French painter
- John Olive (born 1955), American basketball player and coach
- John Olive (rugby league) (born 1996), Australian rugby league footballer
- Karl Olive (born 1969), French sports journalist and politician
- Keith Olive (born 1956), American theoretical physicist
- Les Olive (1928–2006), English football executive
- Lindsay Shepherd Olive (1917–1988), American mycologist
- Mark Olive (born 1962), Aboriginal Australian chef
- Martin Olive (born 1958), English cricketer
- Milton L. Olive III (1946–1965), United States Army Medal of Honor recipient
- Renato Olive (born 1971), Italian footballer
- Rich Olive (1949-2016), American politician
- Thomas Olive (1635–1692), American politician
- Tim Olive (born 1946), Canadian politician
- Vivienne Olive (born 1950), British-German composer and music educator

== See also ==
- Olive (disambiguation)
- Olive (given name)
- Oliva (surname)
- Olivé
- Oliver (surname)
- Olivi
- Olive May (disambiguation)
