= Birmingham school (economics) =

Schools of economic thought in Birmingham, England, the United Kingdom

The Birmingham School was a school of economic thought that emerged in Birmingham, England during the post-Napoleonic depression that affected England following the end of the Napoleonic Wars in 1815.

== Overview ==
Arguing an underconsumptionist theory – attributing the depression to the fall in demand due to the end of the wars and end of war mobilization – Birmingham School economists opposed the gold standard and advocated the use of an expansionary monetary policy to achieve full employment.

The leading thinker and spokesman for the Birmingham School was the banker Thomas Attwood. Other notable figures included George Frederick Muntz and Thomas Attwood's brother Matthias Attwood. Economists who lent the Birmingham School some support included Arthur Young, Patrick Colquhoun and Sir John Sinclair.

Dismissed at the time as "currency cranks" or "crude inflationists", the theories of the Birmingham School are now recognized as embryonic versions of the Keynesian economics of the 1930s. Some of Attwood's writings contain formulations of the multiplier effect and an income-expenditure model. In his 1954 History of Economic Analysis, Joseph Schumpeter wrote that "it is from these writings that any study of modern ideas on monetary management ought to start".

== See also ==
- Manchester School, the other contemporary school associated with British industrial capitalism
- Peel's Bill

== Bibliography ==
- Checkland, S. G. (1948), "The Birmingham Economists, 1815-1850", The Economic History Review, 1 (1): 1–19, doi:10.2307/2590000, JSTOR 2590000
- Kindleberger, Charles P. (1985), "British Financial Reconstruction 1815-22 and 1918-25", in Kindleberger, Charles P. (ed.), Keynesianism vs. Monetarism: And Other Essays in Financial History, Taylor & Francis (published 2006), ISBN 0-415-38212-2
- Miller, Henry. "Radicals, Tories or Monomaniacs? The Birmingham Currency Reformers in the House of Commons, 1832-67," Parliamentary History (2012) 31#3 pp 354–377.
- Schumpeter, Joseph A. (1954), History of economic analysis, Routledge (published 1994), ISBN 0-415-10888-8
- Glasner, David (1997), "Attwood, Thomas (1783-1856)", in Glasner, David (ed.), Business Cycles and Depressions: An Encyclopedia, Taylor & Francis, pp. 22–23, ISBN 0-8240-0944-4
