= Richard Spooner (MP) =

British businessman and politician

- Born: 28 July 1783
- Died: 24 November 1864 (aged 81)
- Occupations: businessman; politician
- Spouse: Charlotte Wetherell (m. 1804)
- Parent(s): Isaac Spooner; Barbara Gough

Richard Spooner (28 July 1783 – 24 November 1864) was a British businessman and politician. In his youth he was a Radical reformer, but in later life he moved to the political right to become an Ultra-Tory.

== Early life and family ==
Spooner was born at Rookery House in Birches Green, Erdington, and was the son of Isaac Spooner, a banker and magistrate in nearby Birmingham. Following education at Rugby School, he joined a banking company, where he was in partnership with Thomas Attwood. In 1804 he married Charlotte Wetherell, daughter of Nathan Wetherell, the Dean of Hereford. He was involved in the civic life of Birmingham, helping to found the Mechanics Institute in 1820, of which he was the first president.

== Radical politics ==
In 1812 Spooner and Attwood led a campaign to repeal the orders in council introduced in 1807 as part of the government's campaign of economic warfare against France. The orders, which had severely affected the trade of Birmingham, were repealed later in the year.

In March 1820 he contested the general election at Boroughbridge, Yorkshire. The constituency was a two-seat "pocket borough" in the hands of the Dukes of Newcastle, who supported the Tory candidates. However, Spooner, running as a Radical, and Marmaduke Lawson, a Whig were elected. Three months later, the Tories managed to have the election of both MPs overturned on petition.

In 1826 Spooner again stood for parliament at Warwickshire. While he had overwhelming support from the voters of Birmingham, he was unsuccessful. In December of the same year a parliamentary vacancy was caused, when Richard Ironmonger MP for Stafford died. Spooner was chosen as the Radical candidate to contest the ensuing by-election, but was defeated in a straight fight by the Whig, Thomas Beaumont. He was expected to contest the seat again at the next general election in 1830. Instead he stood at Coventry, where his colleague Attwood had been requested to stand, but had declined. Once again, he failed to be elected.

== Move to the Tories ==
By 1832 Spooner's repeated electoral defeats led to his moving away from Radical politics. In that year he was asked to join the Birmingham Political Union, but declined the invitation. By the time of the 1835 general election he had made a complete change in his political views. The Birmingham Daily Post described his conversion:

"...from having been a bold and uncompromising Liberal, became ultimately one of the most determined, immovable and obstructive members of the ultra-Tory party."

== Member of parliament for Birmingham ==
In 1835 and 1841 Spooner stood as the Tory candidate against Birmingham's sitting Radical MPs. He was heavily defeated on both occasions. In 1844, Joshua Scholefield, one of the town's members of parliament, died. Consequently, a by-election was held. Spooner was again the Tory candidate and was opposed by William Scholefield, son of the deceased MP, who was expected to hold the seat for the Radicals. However, the Whig/Radical vote was split when a third candidate, Joseph Sturge, entered the contest. Spooner was elected "most likely to his own astonishment" as the first Tory MP for Birmingham. It was noted that the "personal liking felt for the man was temporarily permitted to outweigh the general resentment at his political apostasy". At the next general election in 1847 the Whigs were reunited, and Spooner lost the seat to William Scholefield.

== Member of parliament for North Warwickshire ==
Having lost his seat at Birmingham in July 1847, Spooner was immediately nominated as a Conservative candidate for the two-member Northern Division of Warwickshire where polling was not held until August. On 16 August he was duly declared elected, along with his party colleague, Charles Newdigate Newdegate. He held the seat at the general elections of 1852, 1857 and 1859.

Spooner was a member of the "Ultra" faction of the Tories. He was a proponent of protectionism and a strong Anglican, opposing any measures of relief to Roman Catholics, "Dissenters" or Jews. In his later years he was considered a figure of fun, with his annual (and barely audible) speech denouncing the renewal of the grant to Maynooth Seminary treated with derision. In his obituary his later parliamentary contributions were summarised:

"...every proposal which in his early life would have elicited his most strenuous approval, received in his old age his most vehement opposition".

In 1862 he became unwell, and ceased attending the Commons. He delayed his resignation as the local Conservative organisation had no agreed candidate in the event of a vacancy. He lived in virtual retirement at Henwood Lodge, Leamington Spa, where he died in November 1864. He was buried in the family vault at Elmdon.

== Notes ==
Parliament of the United Kingdom
Preceded by George Mundy and Marmaduke Lawson	Member of Parliament for Boroughbridge; 1820; With: Marmaduke Lawson	Succeeded by George Mundy and Henry Dawkins
Preceded by Joshua Scholefield and George Muntz	Member of Parliament for Birmingham; 1844–1847; With: George Muntz	Succeeded by William Scholefield and George Muntz
Preceded by Charles Newdigate Newdegate and William Stratford Dugdale	Member of Parliament for North Warwickshire; 1847–1864; With: Charles Newdigate Newdegate	Succeeded by Charles Newdigate Newdegate and William Bromley-Davenport
