= Olive (given name) =

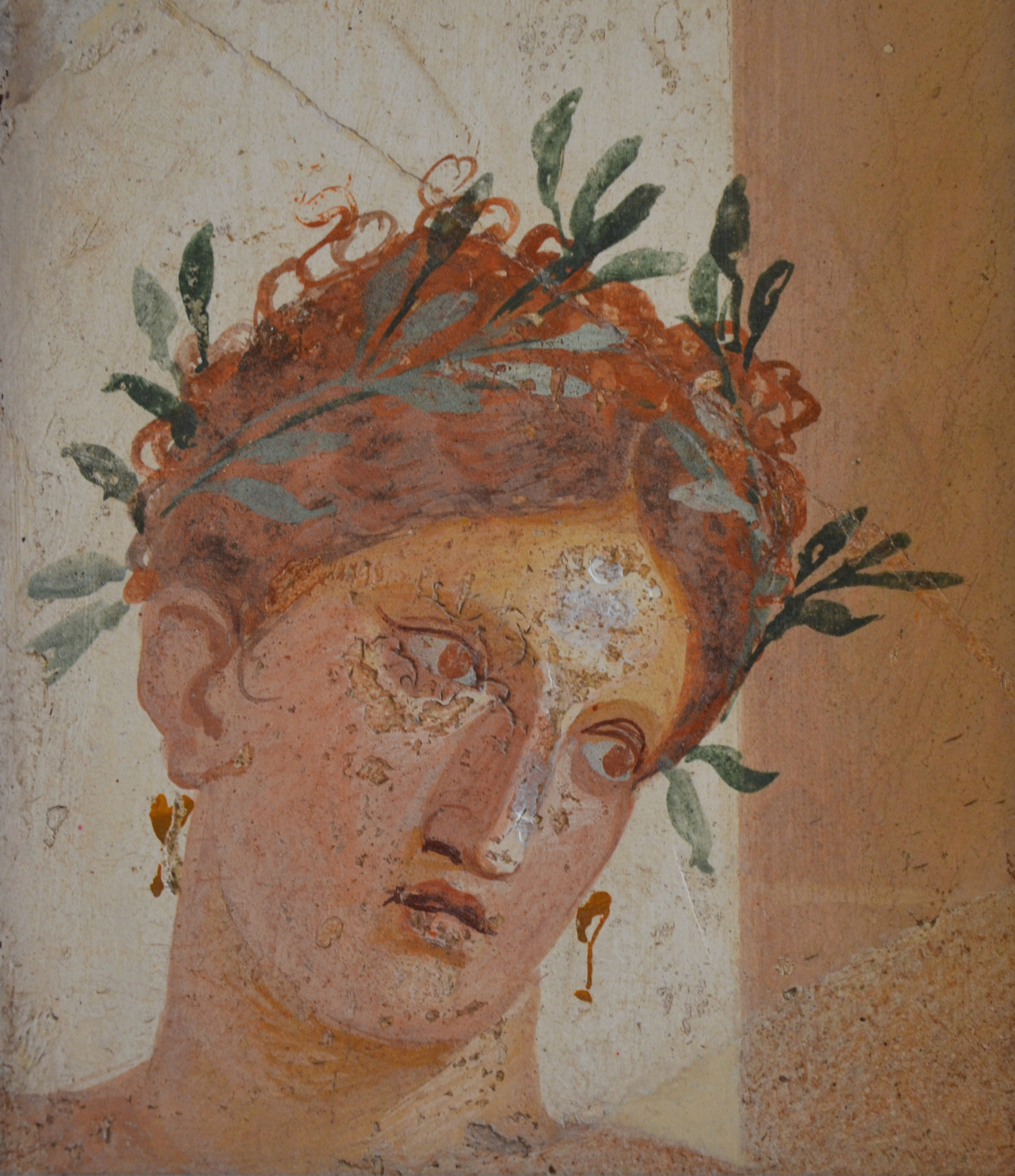
- Ancient Roman woman wearing a garland of olives in a fresco from Herculaneum.
- Gender: Feminine

Origin
- Origin: English
- Meaning: olive tree

Other names
- Related names: Oliver, Olivia

Olive is a feminine given name of English origin meaning olive tree. The name is associated with peace because of the symbolism of the olive branch. An olive wreath has traditionally been worn by champions as a symbol of victory. It has also been seen as a symbol of fruitfulness.

== Popularity ==
Olive came into fashion in English-speaking countries in the 1800s along with other tree, plant and flower names for girls and was a more popular name during that era than the related Olivia, which has been among the most popular names for girls in recent years. Olive was among the top hundred names for girls in the United States in the late 1800s and early 1900s and remained among the top one thousand names through 1950. The name declined in popularity in the latter half of the twentieth century.

Its increase in usage in the early twenty-first century has coincided with the popularity of Olivia. It also increased in popularity after the release of the 2006 film Little Miss Sunshine and the 2010 film Easy A, both of which featured a lead character named Olive. In the film Easy A, Olive is said to be an anagram of the words “I love.” Author Laura Wattenberg notes that the name is “aggressively contrarian” and atypical of the style of names that have been popular in recent years but its counterculture style might explain its increase in usage.

Olive has again been among the top one thousand names for newborn American girls since 2007, among the top three hundred names for girls since 2012 and among the top two hundred most popular names for American girls since 2020.

Olive also ranked among the top 150 names for newborn girls in Canada in 2023.

Olive has been similarly popular in England and Wales, where it has been among the top five hundred names for girls since 2008 and was among the hundred most popular names for girls in 2020.

== People ==
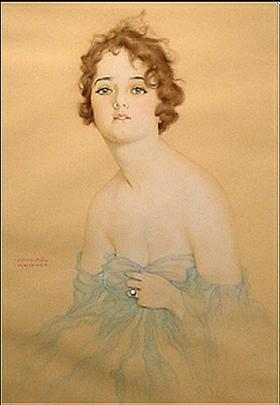
- Olive Thomas by Raphael Kirchner
  Olive Pink (1884–1975), Australian botanical illustrator and activist for Aboriginal rights
- Olive (martyr) (Blessed Olive), a Catholic martyr from Italy
- Olive, Lady Baillie (1899–1974), Anglo-American heiress, landowner and hostess
- Olive Ayhens (born 1943), American visual artist
- Olive Beamish (1890–1978), Irish born suffragette, used pseudonym 'Phyllis Brady' when arrested and force-fed
- Olive Checkland (1920–2004), English historian and writer
- Olive Cook (1912–2002), British writer and artist
- Olive E. Dana (1859–1904), American author
- Olive Dehn (1914–2007), English children's writer and poet
- Olive Dutton Green (1878–1930), Australian artist
- Olive Edmundson, British horticulturalist
- Olive Fremstad (1871–1951), Swedish-American opera singer
- Olive Fitzhardinge (1881–1956), Australian rose breeder
- Olive Stott Gabriel (1872–1944), American activist, clubwoman, and lawyer
- Olive May (disambiguation), several people
- Olive Myrtle Henderson (1877–1957), African American dentist
- Olive Hirst (1912–1994), English advertising agent
- Olive Morris (1952–1979), British community leader and activist
- Olive Osmond (1925–2004) was the matriarch of the American Osmond singing family
- Olive Coates Palgrave (1889–1963), South African botanical illustrator
- Olive D. Pierson (died 1969), American politician from Connecticut
- Olive Sagapolu (born 1997), American football player
- Olive Sanxay (1873–1965), American poet
- Olive Schmeltz (died 1969), American politician
- Olive Schreiner (1855–1920), South African author, anti-war campaigner and intellectual
- Olive Senior (born 1941), Jamaican poet
- Olive Smith (masseuse) (1880–1916), British masseuse physical training instructor, Scottish Women's Hospitals for Foreign Service in World War I
- Olive Thomas (1894–1920), American silent-film actress, art model, and photo model
- Olive Tyrol (died 1951), American politician
- Olive Webb, New Zealand clinical psychologist
- Olive Young (actress) (1903–1940), Chinese-American actress
- Olive Zorian (1916–1965), English violinist

== Fictional characters ==
- Olive, heroine of Olive, the Other Reindeer, an animated Christmas special
- Olive Kitteridge, the title character of a novel by Elizabeth Strout
- Olive Oyl, Popeye's girlfriend
- Olive Snook, from the 2007 TV show Pushing Daisies

== See also ==
- Olive May (disambiguation)
- Olive (disambiguation)
- Olive (surname)
