= Limited voting =

Multiple-winner electoral system

Limited voting (also known as partial block voting) is a voting system in which electors have fewer votes than there are positions available. The positions are awarded to the candidates who receive the most votes. In the special case in which the voter may vote for only one candidate and there are two or more posts, this system is called the single non-transferable vote or sometimes the strictly limited vote.

== Example of limited voting ==
The town of Voterville makes up an electoral district. It elects three representatives to the legislature. The voter has only two votes. At the election, the ballot paper appears thus:

Brian Blue	Blue Party	X
Beryl Blue	Blue Party	X
Boris Blue	Blue Party
Rory Red	Red Party
Rachel Red	Red Party

In this case the voter has voted for Brian and Beryl Blue. They cannot cast a third although there are three seats being contested. Each vote counts as one towards the total for the candidate voted for.

== Practice and issues ==
Limited Voting frequently enables minority groupings to gain representation – unlike first past the post or bloc voting systems.

For example, in Voterville 54% of electors support the Blue Party while 46% support the Red Party. The Blue Party would win all three seats with bloc voting and also under first past the post assuming an even distribution of support across the town, and the Red Party would win no representation.

With limited voting the Red Party would usually win one seat.

Assuming 20,000 electors in the town cast two votes each and the Blue party getting 54 percent of the votes and the Red party getting 46 percent, the results might be:

Brian Blue	9,800 votes	Elected
Beryl Blue	9,600 votes	Elected
Boris Blue	2,200 votes
Rory Red	9,200 votes	Elected
Rachel Red	9,200 votes

Thus two parties obtain representation.

But a minority getting representation (at least one seat) under limited voting is not guaranteed, since a majority party with enough support and proper coordination among its supporters can sweep all of the seats.

To ensure a minority winning one seat out of three when each voter has two votes and only two parties are in the contest, it is sufficient to get the votes of a full two-fifths of the voters. The minority must still nominate two candidates, in order to make sure none of their supporters' votes leak to their opponents. In the above case the Red party had support from just more than two-fifths of the voters.

In cases where there are more than two parties running candidates and voters cast their two votes along party lines, the smaller of the two largest parties must have 40 percent of the total valid votes, or 40 percent of the valid votes of the largest and second-largest parties combined, to be sure to take a seat, and then might elect both of its candidates. If voters do not cast their votes along party lines or do not cast both votes, the smaller of the two largest parties can take a seat only if its most-popular candidate is more popular than the least-popular candidate of the largest party.

If the largest party runs three candidates hoping to take all the seats, it may suffer from vote splitting and take just one seat. (It could happen that both parties would each run three candidates and suffer vote splitting and then the outcome could be conjectured in countless ways.)

If the larger party runs three candidates and the smaller runs two, it is possible for the larger party to win all three seats.

But it is also possible for the least-popular of the two parties to win more seats than the other. The Blue Party, even if it is the most-popular party, may win only one of the available seats if it attempts to win all three and overreaches itself.

Since the Blue party has nearly 60% of the vote, it may be tempted to try to win all three seats. To do this, it must field three candidates. The Red Party, aware of its relative weakness, is likely to choose only to run two and thus not to disperse its vote. (With each voter having two votes, there is no reason to run only one candidate.)

Assuming 20,000 electors in the town cast two votes each, the results might thus be:

Brian Blue	8,600 votes	Elected
Beryl Blue	8,000 votes
Boris Blue	5,000 votes
Rory Red	9,200 votes	Elected
Rachel Red	9,200 votes	Elected

By fielding three candidates the Blue Party split their vote and lost out, despite having a clear majority of voter support in the town.

As can be seen from this example, limited voting does not always produce proportional representation.

Another way in which the system may fail to achieve fair representation is if the largest party is very well organised and can arrange the distribution of its supporters' vote for maximum advantage, while other parties are not so well organized.

In Spain, where limited voting was used for most elections until 1936 and where it is still used today for the Senate, this practice was known as ir al copo (from the verb copar, 'to fulfill'). In both 1977 and 1979 Spanish general elections, the Union of the Democratic Centre won all three seats in the constituency of Gran Canaria.

In this next example, a party first secured a one-party sweep of a district's seats and then manipulated the vote so as to methodically sweep the seats again. In the 1880 election for the three Members of Parliament for the English city of Birmingham, electors cast one or two votes. Liberal candidates filled all three seats, leaving the Conservatives without representation. This is despite the Liberal vote being split among three candidates. Thus the limited vote did not produce mixed representation. The Conservative party may have had only about 15,000 supporters and the Liberal candidates may have had support from about 31,000 so the unfairness of the result is not as stark as it seems from seeing 29,000 Conservative votes disregarded. (The Conservatives' voter support in Birmingham was less than the 40 percent threshold for guaranteed representation mentioned above.)

But due to Limited Voting, it could have been that Conservative candidates received one vote from 29,000 voters and Liberal candidates received at least one vote from all 47,000 voters. Judging the fairness of elections results (and perceiving the portion of voters who saw their choice elected) is much easier when each voter has just one vote.

General Election 1880: Birmingham (3 seats); each voter casting one or two votes
Party	Candidate	Votes	%	±%
Liberal	Philip Henry Muntz	22,969	24.27	N/A
Liberal	John Bright	22,079	23.33	N/A
Liberal	Joseph Chamberlain	19,544	20.65	N/A
Conservative	F.G. Burnaby	15,735	16.63	N/A
Conservative	Hon. A.C.G. Calthorpe	14,308	15.12	N/A

Total votes cast = 94,635.

Estimated number of voters who voted = 47,318 (or more)

Eligible electors = 63,398

Turn-out = 74.6 percent

- Note: Turnout is based on estimated number of voters who voted, calculated by dividing votes cast by two. To the extent that electors did not use both their possible votes (and thus more voted than the number of votes cast divided by two), turnout will be underestimated.

Charles Seymour in Electoral Reform in England and Wales explained the reaction of the Liberals of Birmingham after the limited vote was enacted.

The Liberals of Birmingham realized that if they were to retain the third seat, their vote must be divided economically between the three candidates. To prevent waste of votes, an organization must be built up which could control absolutely the choice of the elector; and each elector must vote invariably as he was told. The success of the Birmingham organization, which soon became known as the Caucus, was unbroken and no Conservative candidate was returned. It was copied in many other constituencies and inaugurated a new era in the development of party electoral machinery, the effect of which upon the representative system has been profound.

This example shows that with proper coordination, it is sometimes within a party's best interest to nominate more candidates than there are votes allowed per voter.

Under single voting in 3-seat district (such as Single non-transferable voting), with the same (likely) voting behavior -- 31,000 Liberal voters and 15,000 Conservative voters -- it seems likely that the Conservatives would have filled one seat if they had run just one candidate. If the Conservative party ran two candidates, it is likely Liberals would win all three seats as under Limited voting.

For a party trying to maximize their seat share, it is never within their best interest to nominate fewer candidates than there are votes allowed per voter. Nominating fewer leaves their supporters unable to use all of their votes on them, leaving some votes either unused, or used on their opponents. A party should only nominate more than this if they have the raw support, and proper organization to win more than this, as shown in the Birmingham example. In other words, if $L$ is the number of votes allowed per voter, and $K$ is the number of seats a party expects to win through proper coordination, they should nominate $\max(L,K)$.

In general, in a two-party system, if $L>\frac{S}{2}$ and both parties run exactly $L$ candidates, then the party with the most support is expected to win $L$ seats, and the runner up is expected to win $S-L$ seats. If party is aiming for $K$ seats where $K>L$, they will need support greater than $\frac{K}{K+L}$ and proper coordination of their voters. Any party nominating $L$ candidates or fewer does not need to coordinate with their supporters, as their voters only need to vote for all of the candidates they have nominated.

== Types of Limited Voting ==
An PR expert described the two types of limited voting:

-Limited vote (ordinary form) where each voter has a number of votes equivalent to more than half the seats being filled. An example of this is the Birmingham 1880 election described above. Two parties at most are likely represented, and never more than the number of seats.

-Limited vote (special form) where each voter has a number of votes equivalent to less than half the seats being filled. An example of this occurred In Japan during the US-led Allied occupation. In the first post-war election in 1946: in districts with ten or fewer representatives each voter had two votes; in districts with more than ten representatives each voter had three votes. In that election, with district magnitude mostly ranging from 6 to 23, many parties (usually 4 to 7 or more) elected representatives in almost every district.

== History and current use ==
Historic

- In Argentina for the Chamber of Deputies elections, between 1912 and 1948, and between 1958 and 1962.
- In Spain for general, provincial and local elections until 1936.
- In Portugal for legislative elections from 1884 to 1895 and from 1901 to 1926.
- Between 1867 and 1885 in the UK for some House of Commons constituencies.
- In Italy at the end of the nineteenth century.
- In Japan during the US-led Allied occupation in the first post-war election in 1946 permitting two votes per voter in districts with ten or fewer representatives and three votes in districts with more than ten representatives.
- In Estonia, for the Congress of Estonia election in 1990.
- In Canada in Ontario provincial elections in 1896 and 1900 to elect Toronto MLAs.

Current

- In Spain since the restoration of democracy (the end of governance by General Franco) to elect senators from/for the mainland (three votes per voter for four seats per province).
- In the US to elect most municipal offices in Connecticut, many county commissions in Pennsylvania, and some in other states. It has been adopted to resolve voting rights cases in more than 20 municipalities in Alabama and North Carolina, as detailed in Arrington and Ingalls' 1998 article "The limited vote alternative to affirmative districting" (Political Geography, Volume 17, Number 6, Aug 1998, pp. 701–728). In 2009 a federal judge ordered its use for school board elections in Euclid, Ohio.
- In Gibraltar (10 votes per voter for all 17 seats).

== 'Fixed Ratio' or closed-list version of Limited Vote ==
The electoral system whereby two seats are assigned to the leading party-list and one seat to the second-placed party-list normally has the same result as limited vote with two votes per voter for three seats. It is used for the Senate of Argentina and 96 out of 128 seats for the Senate of Mexico, as well as the Senate of Bolivia until 2005. A similar system was used for the Bolivian Constituent Assembly elections of 2 July 2006. Part of the Parliament of Singapore is made up of MPs who finished second in their respective constituencies.

== See also ==
- Cumulative voting
- Plurality-at-large voting
