= Birmingham (constituency) =

Parliamentary constituency in the United Kingdom, 1868–1885

- Former borough constituency for the House of Commons
- County: Warwickshire

1832–1885
- Seats: 1832–1868: Two; 1868–1885: Three
- Created from: Warwickshire
- Replaced by: Birmingham Bordesley, Birmingham Central, Birmingham East, Birmingham Edgbaston, Birmingham North, Birmingham South and Birmingham West

Birmingham was a parliamentary constituency of the House of Commons of the Parliament of the United Kingdom for the city of Birmingham, in what is now the West Midlands Metropolitan County, but at the time was Warwickshire.

== Boundaries and history ==
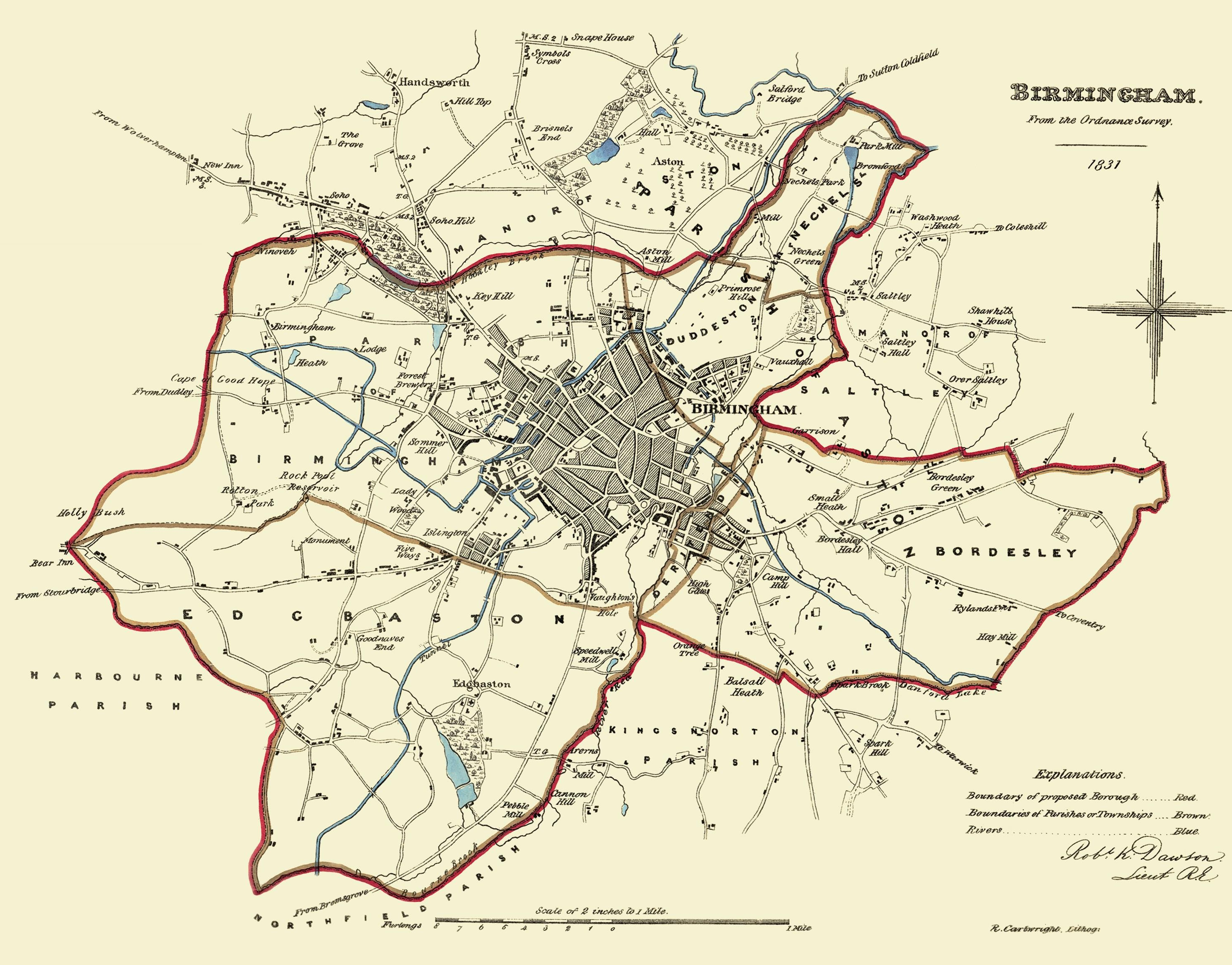
1831 mapping of the proposed new constituency of Birmingham

Until 1832, excepting for the single year 1275, Birmingham was only represented in Parliament as part of the county constituency of Warwickshire.

It became a parliamentary borough in its own right following the passage of the Reform Act 1832 and remained a single constituency electing two members of Parliament until it was divided in 1885.

The Reform Act 1832 introduced a uniform borough franchise on top of ancient franchise rights in existing parliamentary boroughs: (see the Unreformed House of Commons for a list of the different franchises in each borough). As new boroughs, like Birmingham, had no ancient franchise holders only the new franchise rules applied to them. Seymour explains that:-

Only one class of new rights was created by the act of 1832. This was the £10 occupation qualification. According to the act, the franchise was granted to all male persons who for a year before registration had occupied as owner or tenants "any house, warehouse, country house, shop or other building, either separately or jointly with any land" of a clear yearly value of £10. The land must be within the electoral limits of the borough; and in order to qualify, the occupier must have been rated in respect of such premises, to all rates for the relief of the poor; and he must have paid at the time of registration all rates and taxes due from him the preceding April.

This occupation franchise was the characteristic of the borough franchise after 1832. As ownership furnished the ordinary qualification for franchise in the counties, so in the boroughs, occupation, actual or constructive, was the basis of the suffrage. While however, in the counties no provision was made for ascertaining the true value or bona fide rent which was to qualify for the franchise; in the boroughs, assessment to the taxes was embodied with the condition of value, and actual payment was super-added. There was another difference between the character of the county and borough franchises, as determined by the Reform Act. In the latter no claimant could be registered as a voter if he had received parochial relief within the past twelve months; in the counties, no disqualification was attached to the receipt of poor-relief. ...

From 1832 to 1868 the constituency returned two members, but the Representation of the People Act 1867 conferred a third seat from the 1868 United Kingdom general election. However the 1867 act also introduced the limited vote restricting electors in three member constituencies to casting a maximum of two votes.

A way in which the limited vote system may fail to achieve its end of minority representation, is if the largest party is very well organised and is able to arrange the distribution of its supporters vote for maximum advantage. Charles Seymour explained the reaction of the Liberals of Birmingham after the limited vote was enacted.

The Liberals of Birmingham realized that if they were to retain the third seat, their vote must be divided economically between the three candidates.

To prevent waste of votes, an organization must be built up which could control absolutely the choice of the elector; and each elector must vote invariably as he was told. The success of the Birmingham organization, which soon became known as the Caucus was unbroken and no Conservative candidate was returned. It was copied in many other constituencies and inaugurated a new era in the development of party electoral machinery, the effect of which upon the representative system has been profound.

The area was split into seven single-member constituencies in 1885; Birmingham Bordesley, Birmingham Central, Birmingham East, Birmingham Edgbaston, Birmingham North, Birmingham South and Birmingham West.

== Members of Parliament ==
- Constituency created (1832)

Year	First member	First party	Second member	Second party
1832	Thomas Attwood	Radical	Joshua Scholefield	Radical
1840	George Muntz	Radical	Joshua Scholefield	Radical
1844	George Muntz	Radical	Richard Spooner	Conservative
1847	George Muntz	Radical	William Scholefield	Radical
1857	John Bright	Radicals	William Scholefield	Radical
1859	John Bright	Liberal	William Scholefield	Liberal
1867	John Bright	Liberal	George Dixon	Liberal

- Third member added (1868)

Year	First member	First party	Second member	Second party	Third member	Third party
1868	George Dixon	Liberal	Philip Henry Muntz	Liberal	John Bright	Liberal
1876	Joseph Chamberlain	Liberal	Philip Henry Muntz	Liberal	John Bright	Liberal

- Constituency abolished (1885)

== Elections ==
1830s – 1840s – 1850s – 1860s – 1870s – 1880s – References

Note: When the exact number of electors voting is unknown, turnout is estimated on the basis of dividing votes cast by two. To the extent that electors did not use both their possible votes, turnout will be underestimated.

=== Elections in the 1830s ===
General election 1832: Birmingham (2 seats)
Party	Candidate	Votes	%	±%
Radical	Thomas Attwood	Unopposed		
Radical	Joshua Scholefield	Unopposed		
Registered electors				
Radical win (new seat)				
Radical win (new seat)				

General election 1835: Birmingham (2 seats)
Party	Candidate	Votes	%	±%
Radical	Thomas Attwood	1,718	40.0	N/A
Radical	Joshua Scholefield	1,660	38.7	N/A
Conservative	Richard Spooner	915	21.3	New
Majority		745	17.4	N/A
Turnout		2,580	70.1	N/A
Registered electors		3,681		
Radical hold		Swing	N/A	
Radical hold		Swing	N/A	

General election 1837: Birmingham (2 seats)
Party	Candidate	Votes	%	±%
Radical	Thomas Attwood	2,145	40.4	+0.4
Radical	Joshua Scholefield	2,114	39.8	+1.1
Conservative	Augustus Stapleton	1,046	19.7	−1.6
Majority		1,068	20.1	+2.7
Turnout		3,135	59.9	−10.2
Registered electors		5,236		
Radical hold		Swing	+0.6	
Radical hold		Swing	+1.0	

Back to Elections

=== Elections in the 1840s ===
- Resignation of Attwood by accepting the office of Steward of the Chiltern Hundreds

By-election, 25 January 1840: Birmingham
Party	Candidate	Votes	%	±%
Radical	George Muntz	1,458	61.4	−18.8
Conservative	Charles Wetherell	917	38.6	+18.9
Majority		541	22.8	+2.7
Turnout		2,375	51.4	−8.5
Registered electors		4,619		
Radical hold		Swing	−18.9	

General election 1841: Birmingham (2 seats)
Party	Candidate	Votes	%	±%
Radical	George Muntz	2,176	36.5	−3.9
Radical	Joshua Scholefield	1,963	32.9	−6.9
Conservative	Richard Spooner	1,825	30.6	+10.9
Majority		138	2.3	−17.8
Turnout		3,756	64.0	+4.1
Registered electors		5,870		
Radical hold		Swing	−4.7	
Radical hold		Swing	−6.2	

- Death of Scholefield

By-election, 15 July 1844: Birmingham
Party	Candidate	Votes	%	±%
Conservative	Richard Spooner	2,095	50.2	+19.6
Radical	William Scholefield	1,735	41.5	−27.9
Radical	Joseph Sturge	346	8.3	N/A
Majority		360	8.7	N/A
Turnout		4,176	68.1	+4.1
Registered electors		6,129		
Conservative gain from Radical		Swing	+23.8	

General election 1847: Birmingham (2 seats)
Party	Candidate	Votes	%	±%
Radical	George Muntz	2,830	35.2	−1.3
Radical	William Scholefield	2,824	35.1	+2.2
Conservative	Richard Spooner	2,302	28.6	−2.0
Radical	Robert Allen (Birmingham candidate)	89	1.1	N/A
Majority		522	6.5	+4.2
Turnout		5,110	72.2	+8.2
Registered electors		7,081		
Radical hold		Swing	−0.2	
Radical hold		Swing	+1.6	

- Note (1847): 5,110 electors voted. Scholefield was classified (for this election) as a Radical, as was Allen. (Source: Stooks Smith)

Back to Elections

=== Elections in the 1850s ===
General election 1852: Birmingham (2 seats)
Party	Candidate	Votes	%	±%
Radical	George Muntz	Unopposed		
Radical	William Scholefield	Unopposed		
Registered electors		7,936		
Radical hold				
Radical hold				

General election 1857: Birmingham (2 seats)
Party	Candidate	Votes	%	±%
Radical	George Muntz	Unopposed		
Radical	William Scholefield	Unopposed		
Registered electors		9,074		
Radical hold				
Radical hold				

- Death of Muntz.

By-election, 10 August 1857: Birmingham
Party	Candidate	Votes	%	±%
Radical	John Bright	Unopposed		
Radical hold				

General election 1859: Birmingham (2 seats)
Party	Candidate	Votes	%	±%
Liberal	William Scholefield	4,425	43.2	N/A
Liberal	John Bright	4,282	41.8	N/A
Conservative	Thomas Dyke Acland	1,544	15.1	New
Majority		2,738	26.7	N/A
Turnout		5,898 (est)	64.0 (est)	N/A
Registered electors		9,222		
Liberal hold		Swing	N/A	
Liberal hold		Swing	N/A	

Back to Elections

=== Elections in the 1860s ===
General election 1865: Birmingham (2 seats)
Party	Candidate	Votes	%	±%
Liberal	John Bright	Unopposed		
Liberal	William Scholefield	Unopposed		
Registered electors		14,997		
Liberal hold				
Liberal hold				

- 'Death of Scholefield

By-Election 23 July 1867: Birmingham
Party	Candidate	Votes	%	±%
Liberal	George Dixon	5,819	58.0	N/A
Conservative	Sampson Lloyd	4,214	42.0	New
Majority		1,605	16.0	N/A
Turnout		10,033	66.9	N/A
Registered electors		14,997		
Liberal hold		Swing	N/A	

General election 1868: Birmingham (3 seats)
Party	Candidate	Votes	%	±%
Liberal	George Dixon	15,198	25.3	N/A
Liberal	Philip Henry Muntz	14,614	24.3	N/A
Liberal	John Bright	14,601	24.3	N/A
Conservative	Sampson Lloyd	8,700	14.5	N/A
Conservative	Sebastian Evans	7,061	11.7	N/A
Majority		5,901	9.8	N/A
Turnout		22,685 (est)	54.0 (est)	N/A
Registered electors		42,042		
Liberal hold		Swing	N/A	
Liberal hold		Swing	N/A	
Liberal win (new seat)				

- Appointment of Bright as President of the Board of Trade

By-Election 21 December 1868: Birmingham
Party	Candidate	Votes	%	±%
Liberal	John Bright	Unopposed		
Liberal hold				

Back to Elections

=== Elections in the 1870s ===
- Appointment of Bright as Chancellor of the Duchy of Lancaster

By-election, 20 Oct 1873: Birmingham
Party	Candidate	Votes	%	±%
Liberal	John Bright	Unopposed		
Liberal hold				

General election 1874: Birmingham (3 seats)
Party	Candidate	Votes	%	±%
Liberal	John Bright	Unopposed		
Liberal	George Dixon	Unopposed		
Liberal	Philip Henry Muntz	Unopposed		
Registered electors		51,361		
Liberal hold				
Liberal hold				
Liberal hold				

- Resignation of Dixon

By-election, 27 June 1876: Birmingham
Party	Candidate	Votes	%	±%
Liberal	Joseph Chamberlain	Unopposed		
Liberal hold				

Back to Elections

=== Elections in the 1880s ===
94635

General election 1880: Birmingham (3 seats)
Party	Candidate	Votes	%	±%
Liberal	Philip Henry Muntz	22,969	24.3	N/A
Liberal	John Bright	22,079	23.3	N/A
Liberal	Joseph Chamberlain	19,544	20.7	N/A
Conservative	Frederick Burnaby	15,735	16.6	New
Conservative	Augustus Gough-Calthorpe	14,308	15.1	New
Majority		3,809	4.1	N/A
Turnout		94,635	74.6	N/A
Registered electors		63,398		
Liberal hold		Swing	N/A	
Liberal hold		Swing	N/A	
Liberal hold		Swing	N/A	

- Appointment of Bright as Chancellor of the Duchy of Lancaster and Chamberlain as President of the Board of Trade

By-Election 8 May 1880: Birmingham (2 seats)
Party	Candidate	Votes	%	±%
Liberal	John Bright	Unopposed		
Liberal	Joseph Chamberlain	Unopposed		
Liberal hold				
Liberal hold				

- Constituency abolished 1885

Back to Elections

== Sources ==
- British Parliamentary Election Results 1832–1885, compiled and edited by F.W.S. Craig (Macmillan Press 1977)
- Electoral Reform in England and Wales, by Charles Seymour (David & Charles Reprints 1970) originally published in 1915, so out of copyright
- The Parliaments of England by Henry Stooks Smith (1st edition published in three volumes 1844–50), second edition edited (in one volume) by F.W.S. Craig (Political Reference Publications 1973) originally published in 1844–50, so out of copyright
- Who's Who of British Members of Parliament: Volume I 1832–1885, edited by M. Stenton (The Harvester Press 1976)
- Leigh Rayment's Historical List of MPs – Constituencies beginning with "B" (part 3)
