= Olive May (disambiguation) =

Olive May (1871–1938) was an American stage actress. It may also refer to:

- Olive May (Filipino actress) (born 2004), Filipina actress, singer and model.
- Olive May Pearce a.k.a. Sister Eucharia (1914–1999), Australian religious sister.

== See also ==
- Olive (disambiguation)
- Olive (given name)
- Olive (surname)
