= Olivé =

Olivé is a surname, and may refer to:

- Ceferí Olivé (1907–1995), Catalan painter
- Joan Olivé (born 1984), Spanish motorcycle road racer.
- Josep Anton Codina Olivé (1932–2021), Spanish theatre director
- Nuria Olivé (born 1968), Spanish field hockey player
- Sylvie Olivé, French production designer

== See also ==
- Olive (surname)
