= Levant Crisis =

Military confrontation between UK and France in Syria in May 1945

- Part of the decolonisation of Asia after World War II
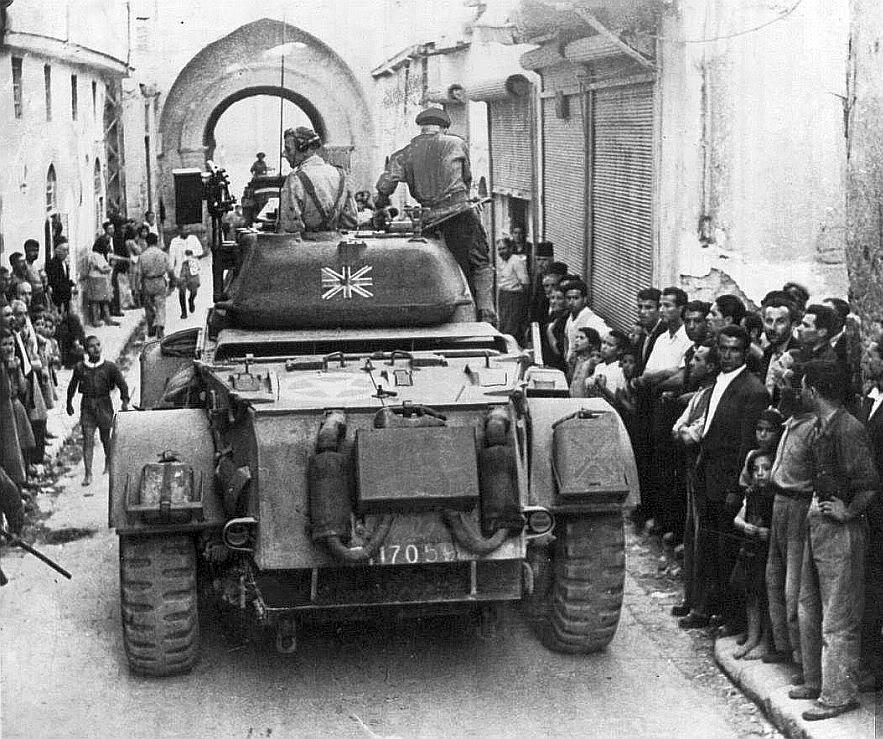
- British armoured cars moving through the streets of Damascus during the Levant Crisis in May 1945
Date	19 May – 19 July 1945 (2 months)
Location	French Mandate for Syria and the Lebanon
Result	British–Syrian victory
Territorial changes	French withdrawal from the Levant

Belligerents
United Kingdom; Syria	France

Commanders and leaders
(United Kingdom) Winston Churchill; (United Kingdom) Bernard Paget; (First Syrian Republic) Shukri al-Quwatli	(France) Charles de Gaulle; (France) Fernand Olive

The Levant Crisis, also known as the Damascus Crisis, the Syrian Crisis, or the Levant Confrontation, was a military confrontation that took place between British and French forces in Syria in May 1945 soon after the end of World War II in Europe. French troops had tried to quell nationalist protests in Syria against the continued occupation of the Levant by France. With hundreds of Syrian nationalists being killed by French troops, British Prime Minister Winston Churchill, wanting to maintain friendly relations with the Arabs, opposed French action and sent British forces into Syria from Transjordan with orders to fire on the French if necessary.

British armoured cars and troops then reached the Syrian capital of Damascus, following which the French were escorted and confined to their barracks. With political pressure added, the French ordered a ceasefire. Syria became fully independent in July 1946. The crisis infuriated the French leader Charles de Gaulle and almost brought Britain and France to the point of war.

== Background ==
Map of French Mandates – Syria and Lebanon

At the beginning of the 20th century, Syria and Lebanon were primarily Arab-populated regions corresponding to most of the region known to Europeans as the Levant and comprised multiple provincial (eyalet/vilayet) and sub-provincial units of the Ottoman Empire. After the Ottoman defeat there in World War I and as a result of the Treaty of Sevres, they were then ruled under a French mandate given by the League of Nations at the Paris Peace Conference in 1919.

In 1936, Syria signed a treaty with France which provided Syrian independence. However, with the breakout of World War II this never happened as the French feared that Nazi Germany would fill the vacuum left by any French withdrawal from its mandates in the Middle East. Riots thus broke out and the new President Hashim al-Atassi resigned. With the fall of France in 1940, Syria came under the control of Vichy France until the British and Free French occupied the country in the Syria–Lebanon campaign in July 1941. Syria proclaimed its independence again in 1941, but it was not until 1 January 1944 that it was recognised as an independent republic. For several months after both Lebanon and Syria had seen demonstrations against the French. With more and more French reinforcements having arrived, the demonstrations soon escalated.

Charles de Gaulle as head of the French Provisional Government sent General Paul Beynet to establish an air base in Syria and a naval base in Lebanon in April 1945. News of this provoked more nationalist protests in Damascus. On Victory in Europe Day, both countries saw huge protests, in which some French nationals were attacked and killed. The French responded to these protests with threats of artillery and air strikes in an effort to stop the movement towards independence. Talks ceased immediately, and skirmishes took place between the Arabs and the French and Senegalese forces while Syrian and Lebanese soldiers deserted their French officers.

== Crisis ==
The crisis proper began on 19 May when demonstrations in Damascus involved firing on the grounds of the French hospital; about a dozen people were injured but none were killed. The next day serious rioting broke out in Aleppo in which three French soldiers were killed and some injured. The French blamed the deaths on the inability of the Syrian gendarmerie to maintain order and looked to use this as an excuse to use French troops to restore order. By 27 May fighting escalated between Syrian youths and the French army in Hama and Homs. Tensions continued to escalate due to events in Hama. A dispute between the local French and Syrian gendarmes resulted in French reinforcements being sent to the city. This relief column was ambushed leading to the deaths of French soldiers and the Syrian capture of artillery and armoured vehicles. The French retaliated with force, leading to around 80 deaths in Hama. The French Delegate General Plenipotentiary for the Levant, Paul Beynet, was in an increasingly combative mood as a result of the violence and believed that in order to restore order across the country the 'Damascus abscess must be lanced'. On Beynet's command, General Oliva-Roget ordered his troops to begin shelling Damascus on May 29.

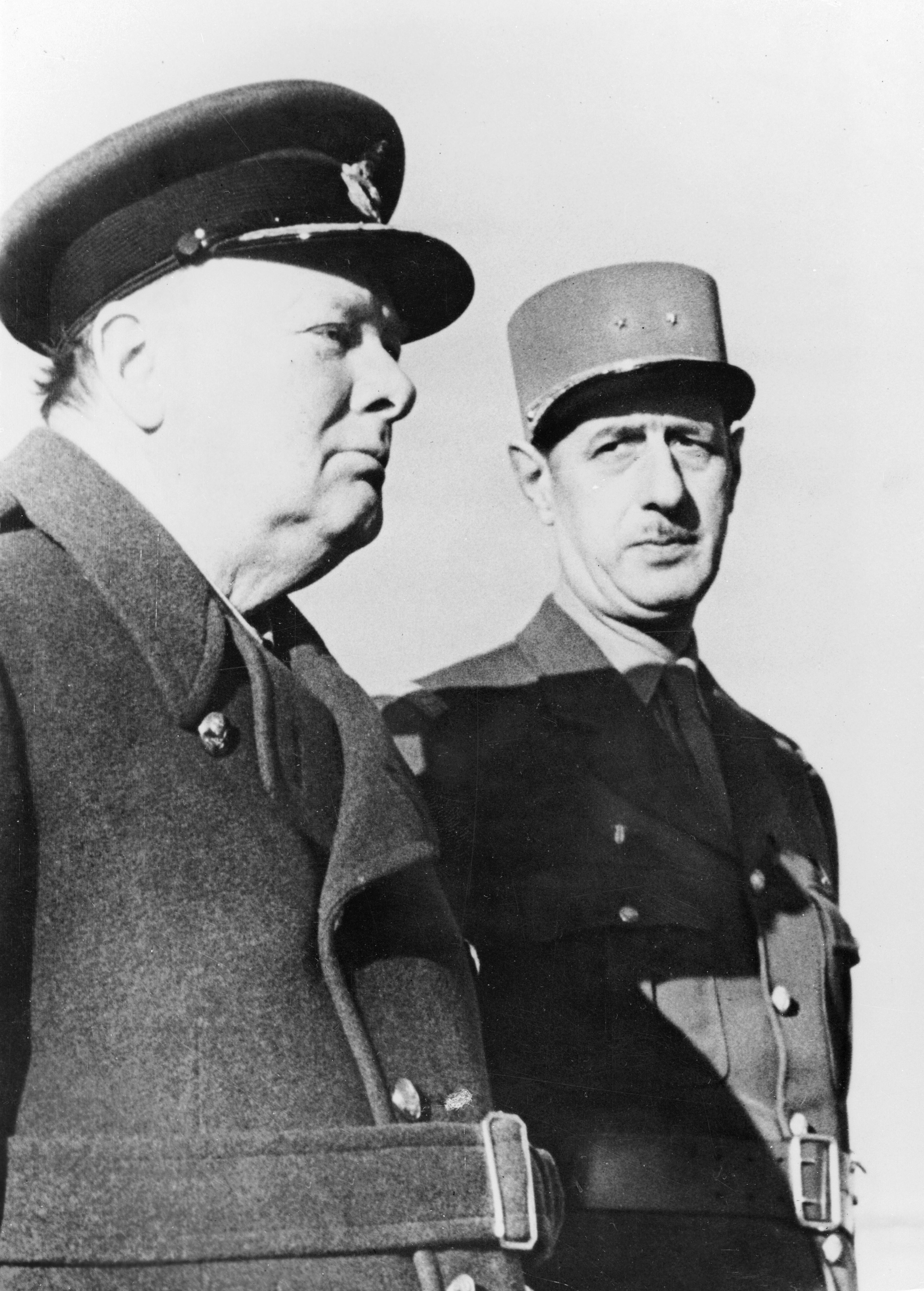
Winston Churchill and Charles De Gaulle in a meeting in 1944

On 29 May, French troops stormed the Syrian parliament and tried to arrest the President Shukri al-Quwatli and the speaker Saadallah al-Jabiri but both managed to escape. The French burned, bombarded the building and then cut off Damascus's electricity. They also sealed off Syria's borders with Jordan, Iraq and Lebanon. The French began shelling with artillery and mortars while colonial Senegalese troops were sent in, who committed acts of looting and wanton destruction. French troops fired indiscriminately into the crowd. Oliva-Roget ordered his men to teach the Syrians "a good lesson." North and West African colonial troops dumped the bodies in mass graves.

Overall, roughly 1,000 Syrians were killed and hundreds of homes were destroyed.

Having managed to escape via a British armoured car, Quwatli sent an urgent request to Prime Minister Winston Churchill for British troops to intervene. Churchill, hoping to maintain favour with the Arabs, said he would do what he could, but his relationship with Charles de Gaulle was at a low ebb following his visit to Paris the previous year, in spite of his efforts to preserve French interests following the Yalta Conference. In January Churchill told a colleague that he believed that de Gaulle was "a great danger to peace and for Great Britain. After five years of experience, I am convinced that he is the worst enemy of France in her troubles ... he is one of the greatest dangers to European peace. ... I am sure that in the long run no understanding will be reached with General de Gaulle".

General Bernard Paget, who was in charge of the British Ninth Army reminded the French they fell under his command. De Gaulle had thought this ended with the war over in Europe but would actually terminate once the Pacific War had ended. Paget had a large force in the region at his disposal and threatened that he would be forced to intervene from Transjordan if the violence did not stop. Churchill agreed but needed the backing of the United States and the Soviet Union in which to send British troops against the French.

At the same time, the French Army of the Levant in the region had been severely weakened – nearly 70 percent of all officers and 40 percent of Syrian soldiers in the French army had deserted their posts and taken up arms with the Syrian rebels. In Hama two French aircraft were downed, while the commander of a French unit was ambushed and killed. In Hauran French troops were rounded up and disarmed – their weapons distributed to young men hoping to march towards Damascus to help the central government. The French then called in for reinforcements and were now using their air force to drop bombs on suspected areas of resistance. At the same time the Syrian Prime Minister Faris al-Khoury was at the founding conference of the United Nations in San Francisco, presenting Syria's claim for independence and also ordered the fighting to stop. They were both backed by President Harry Truman, who declared "those French ought to be taken out and castrated."

=== British intervention ===
Finally, on 31 May, with news that the casualty toll had exceeded a thousand Syrians, Churchill sent de Gaulle a message saying, "In order to avoid a collision between British and French forces, we request you immediately order French troops to cease fire and withdraw to their barracks". This was ignored and the next day Churchill authorised Paget to invade without waiting for a response from the Americans.

On 1 June, Paget ordered his force to invade Syria from Transjordan, with troops and tanks of the 31st Indian Armoured Division. They struck towards Damascus with 'D' Squadron of the Kings Dragoon Guards having rolled into Beirut, from which they cut the communications of Oliva-Roget. Paget ordered Oliva-Roget to tell his men to cease fire, but the latter said he would not take orders from the British even though Paget was his superior officer and Commander of Middle East Command. Paget then advanced towards Damascus. Oliva-Roget realised he was heavily outnumbered, and ordered his men back to their base near the coast. He was angry that the British had arrived only after he had "restored order". He told a Syrian journalist, "You are replacing the easygoing French with the brutal British." That night, with the Syrians killing any French or Senegalese troops they could find, the French were forced to accept the British escort back to the safety of their barracks at gunpoint.

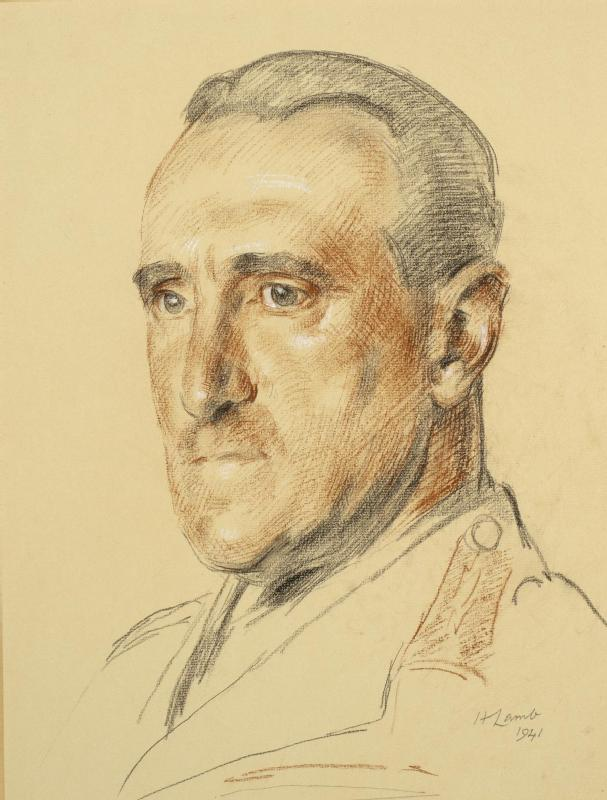
Sir Bernard Paget Commander of Middle East Command

The British then had to mop up any of the French who had still not returned to their barracks much to the cheers of the people of Damascus. The damage to the city was considerable; the Syrian parliament building was a smouldering shell, a large area of the town had been destroyed by fire and the streets were pitted with shell holes.

The Manchester Guardian reported the event with patriotic delight:

I marched into Damascus with the sailors ... while crowds of surprised Damascenes clapped their hands. ... The people of Damascus hissed and booed the long line of British lorries, tanks and Bren gun carriers taking French troops out of the city, escorted by British armoured cars.

On 2 June, De Gaulle realised nothing could be done and reluctantly arranged a ceasefire – Oliva-Roget was later sacked, but a furious row broke out between Britain and France.

=== Ceasefire and diplomacy ===
Once Paget had taken control of Damascus he then imposed a curfew on all French citizens. French soldiers were kept in their barracks and were not allowed to fire their weapons except in self-defence under the watchful eyes of British guns. French ships were to stay out of gun range out to sea and not to move in unless told to. French aircraft were grounded with British troops guarding the airfields. British and Indian troops and tanks then spread all over Syria as there were still small mopping up operations to be done.

The next day with the ceasefire in place – two troops of 'A' Squadron of the Kings Dragoon Guards encamped on the Damascus race course, they escorted high-ranking French officers who were otherwise unable to move about the town safely. By 12 June 'A' Squadron KDG went to Baalbek in the Bekaa valley and on 2 July 'B' Squadron was sent to Tel Kalakh to resupply a French garrison which had been cut off. Two troops of 'B' Squadron, known as Mannforce, went on 6 July to Latakia, where a fight had broken out the previous day after a French military vehicle ran over a child, resulting in his death. Mass demonstrations took place in the city denouncing the mandate, to which the French responded with gunfire. However, Syrian police officers had shot back, resulting in casualties on both sides. Overall, 16 Syrians and 20 French soldiers were killed. The British Army transferred a number of French officers to Beirut afterwards. On 10 July Mannforce, together with the 2nd Sherwood Foresters, were called to Baniyas when the French opened fire on the town with mortars and machine guns. With control restored there Lieutenant Mann then took a party to the Turkish frontier to bring back the horses and French officers of their Cavalry unit, whose men had deserted. By this time order was restored in the majority of Syria.

Beynet was furious and labelled the British measures as a "stab in the back". De Gaulle raged against 'Churchill's ultimatum' saying that, "the whole thing stank of oil". The British ambassador to France Duff Cooper was summoned by the French foreign minister Georges Bidault saying "whatever mistakes France had made she did not deserve such humiliation as this". De Gaulle saw it as a heinous Anglo-Saxon conspiracy: he told Cooper, "I recognise that we are not in a position to wage war against you, but you have betrayed France and betrayed the West. That cannot be forgotten."

Quwatli was informed that British troops were in control of Syria; they requested Quwatli's cooperation in enforcing an evening curfew in the country. Quwatli complied and expressed his gratitude to the British government.

== Aftermath ==
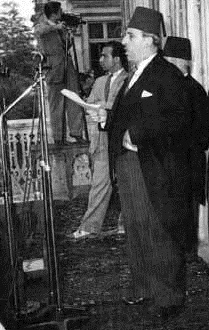
Syrian President Shukri al-Quwatli declaring Syria's independence from France, 17 April 1946

Continuing pressure from Syrian nationalist groups and the British intervention forced the French to withdraw completely from Syria to Lebanon by the end of July and by this time the Mandate had effectively been erased. The British force took a more prominent role in the policing of Syrian cities and designated tribal areas over the Summer and Autumn of 1945.

France was isolated and was suffering yet another diplomatic crisis – the third one of 1945, after Stuttgart and the Val D'Aosta both of which had infuriated Truman. The secretary of the Arab League Edward Atiyah said, "France put all her cards and two rusty pistols on the table". The French saw the British intervention as a way to bring the Levantine states into its own sphere of influence. There were accusations in the French press that Britain had armed the demonstrators and that Britain was an enemy of France having made another example of herself as perfide albion. They also accused the United States of helping Italy and Germany more than it helped France during the war. The Soviets made it clear that France was in the wrong so De Gaulle criticised them as well. The UK and the US had viewed the French military action in Syria as a potential catalyst for further unrest throughout the Middle East and a detriment to British and American lines of communication in the region.

In October, the international community recognized the independence of Syria and Lebanon, and they were admitted as founding members of the United Nations. On 19 December 1945 an Anglo-French agreement was eventually signed – both British forces from Syria and French forces from Lebanon were to be withdrawn by early 1946. The French evacuated the last of their troops in April of that year whilst the British left in July. Syria became fully independent on 17 April 1946 which left both countries in the hands of a republican governments that had been formed during the mandate.

Bidault labelled the whole crisis worse than that of the Fashoda incident fifty years earlier.

== See also ==
- Battle of Mers-el-Kébir
- Sétif and Guelma massacre
- Fashoda syndrome
- France–United Kingdom relations

== Bibliography ==
- Barr, James (2011). A Line in the Sand. Simon & Schuster. ISBN 9781847394576.
- Bell, P. M. H (2014). France and Britain, 1940–1994: The Long Separation. Routledge. ISBN 9781317888413.
- Brecher, Michael; Wilkenfeld, Jonathan (1997). A Study of Crisis. University of Michigan Press. ISBN 9780472108060.
- Brenchley, Frank (1989). Britain and the Middle East: Economic History, 1945–87 Middle East studies. I.B. Tauris. ISBN 9781870915076.
- Buruma, Ian (2013). Year Zero: A History of 1945. Atlantic Books Ltd. ISBN 9781782392088.
- Dilks, David (2015). Churchill and Company: Allies and Rivals in War and Peace. I.B. Tauris. ISBN 9781780769677.
- Fedorowich, Kent; Thomas, Martin (2013). International Diplomacy and Colonial Retreat. Routledge. ISBN 9781135268664.
- Fenby, Jonathan (2012). The General: Charles De Gaulle and the France He Saved. Skyhorse. ISBN 9781620874479.
- Gaunson, A B (1987). Anglo-French Clash In Lebanon And Syria 1940–45. Springer. ISBN 9781349185498.
- Lentz, Harris M, ed. (2014). Heads of States and Governments Since 1945. Routledge. ISBN 9781134264902.
- Moubayed, Sami (2013). Syria and the USA: Washington's Relations with Damascus from Wilson to Eisenhower Volume 56 of Library of international relations. I.B. Tauris. ISBN 9781780767680.
- Rowland, Benjamin M, ed. (2011). Charles de Gaulle's Legacy of Ideas. Lexington Books.
- Rogan, Eugene (2011). The Arabs: A Complete History. Penguin. ISBN 9780718196837.
- Thomas, Martin (2007). The French Empire at War, 1940–1945 Studies in Imperialism. Manchester University Press. ISBN 9780719065194.
- Wall, Irwin M (1991). The United States and the Making of Postwar France, 1945–1954. Cambridge University Press. ISBN 9780521402170.
