= 1868 Birmingham by-election =

UK parliamentary by-election

The 1868 Birmingham by-election was held on 21 December 1868. The by-election was held due to the incumbent Liberal MP John Bright, becoming President of the Board of Trade. It was retained by Bright who was unopposed.
