= George Dixon (MP) =

English politician and education reformer

George Dixon MP
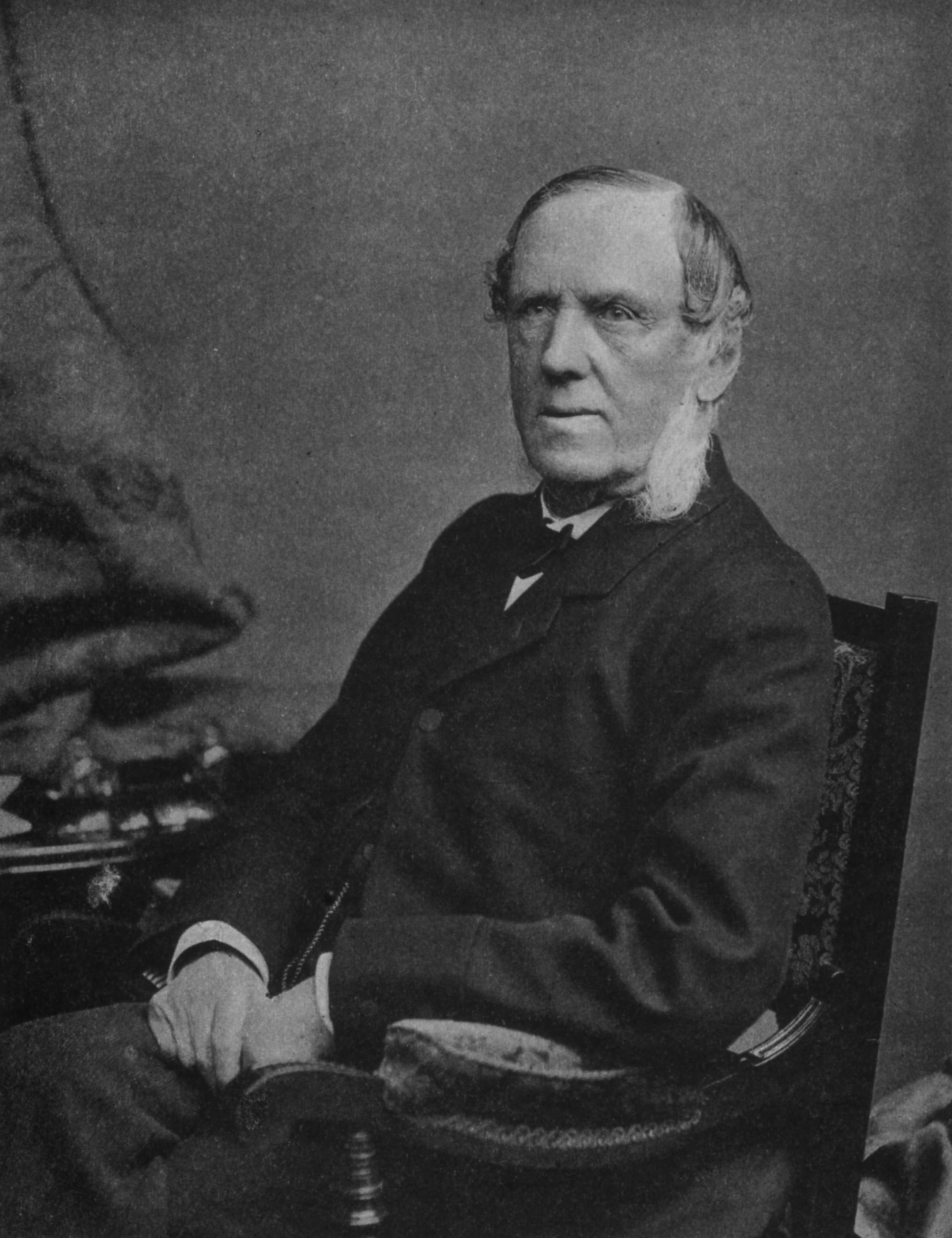
- George Dixon

Member of Parliament for Birmingham Edgbaston
- In office 1885–1898
- Preceded by: New constituency
- Succeeded by: Francis Lowe

Member of Parliament for Birmingham
- In office 1867–1876
- Preceded by: William Scholefield
- Succeeded by: Joseph Chamberlain

Personal details
- Born: 24 January 1820 Gomersal, Yorkshire, England
- Died: 24 January 1898 (aged 78) Edgbaston, Birmingham, England
- Party: Liberal; Liberal Unionist

George Dixon (1820 – 24 January 1898) was an English Liberal Party then Liberal Unionist politician who was active in local government in Birmingham and sat in the House of Commons in two periods between 1867 and 1898. He was a major proponent of education for all children.

== Life ==
Born in 1820 in Gomersal, Yorkshire, he was educated at Leeds Grammar School and learned French in France. He moved to Birmingham in 1838 with his brother and joined Rabone Brothers, a firm of merchants. He became a partner in 1844 and rose to become head of the firm in which he remained all his life.

Dixon entered local government as a councillor for Edgbaston in Birmingham in 1863. He was elected Mayor in November 1866.

In July 1867 he resigned office to become a parliamentary candidate for Birmingham after the death of William Scholefield. He was elected Member of Parliament (MP) on 23 July 1867.

He was elected to the School Board in 1870, and chairman in 1876, after retiring from parliament when his wife became ill. He resigned from the board in 1896. In 1885 he became MP for Edgbaston and continued in Parliament until his death in 1898.

== Education for all ==
One of his first achievements as Mayor in early 1867 was a private conference he held in his house for the leading men of the town to discuss a possible remedy for the lack of education for children. In March a public meeting was held in the Town Hall where the Birmingham Education Society was formed along the lines of one created in Manchester and Salford in 1864. The society raised money to pay the school fees of some children, and raised awareness of the need.

The Education Societies paved the way for the bolder and more political National Education League which started in Birmingham in 1869, chaired by Dixon, with support from Joseph Chamberlain (vice-chairman, later chairman of the executive committee), Jesse Collings (honorary secretary of the League, and of the Education Aid Society), R. W. Dale, and William Harris. The League resolved that a bill should be prepared for the next session of Parliament to give non-sectarian education to all children. After some political promises and compromise the Elementary Education Act 1870 (33 & 34 Vict. c. 75) (Forster's Act) was passed, meeting some of the requirements of the League, and the first School boards were elected. The League continued to campaign for a further seven years and elementary education (to age 12) eventually became free and compulsory in England and Wales. In 1867 Dixon introduced a bill to establish school boards in areas where there were already sufficient schools. This bill was rejected.

One of Dixon's experiments was the creation in 1884 of Bridge Street Technical School in the old Cadbury's premises, bought by him, converted to a school at his own expense, and leased to the board at a nominal rent. It taught science and mechanics to 400 of the brighter boys for two years beyond normal school leaving age. This was a great success and was repeated in large towns across the country, and led to the Technical Instruction Act, which formalised the finance of this type of school. In 1888 the technical school moved to occupy the Oozells Street Board School as the George Dixon Higher Grade School and included girls. Waverley Road Higher Grade School was created in Small Heath in 1892 for 555 children.

Dixon was made an honorary freeman of Birmingham in 1898, the year he died.

== Legacy ==
Dixon established Bridge Street Technical School in 1884: when it moved to new premises in 1888 it was renamed George Dixon Higher Grade School; and when it was rebuilt in 1906, George Dixon School. Its successor schools are George Dixon Primary School and George Dixon Academy in Edgbaston.

Indirectly, Dixon gave his name to the fictional character PC George Dixon, who first appeared in the film The Blue Lamp (1950), produced by a former pupil at George Dixon School, Sir Michael Balcon, and subsequently in the TV series Dixon of Dock Green (1955–1976).

== Family ==
In 1855 Dixon married Mary Stansfeld (died 1885), sister of politician James Stansfeld, and daughter of James Stansfeld, a judge in Halifax. The architect Arthur Stansfield Dixon was their son: in all they had three sons and three daughters.

== Archives ==
George Dixon's letters are held at the Cadbury Research Library (University of Birmingham).

== See also ==
- School board (England & Wales)
- Birmingham board schools
- National Education League

== Bibliography ==
- Chancellor, V. E. (2013) [2004]. "Dixon, George (1820–1898)". Oxford Dictionary of National Biography (online ed.). Oxford University Press. doi:10.1093/ref:odnb/7697. (Subscription, Wikipedia Library access or UK public library membership required.)
- Dixon, James (2013). Out of Birmingham: George Dixon (1820–98): "Father of Free Education". Studley: Brewin Books. ISBN 9781858585048.
- Kenrick, George H. (1909). "George Dixon". In Muirhead, J. H. (ed.). Nine Famous Birmingham Men. Birmingham: Cornish Brothers.
- Stephens, W. B., ed. (1964). "Public Education: Introduction". A History of the County of Warwick: Volume 7: The City of Birmingham. Victoria County History. London. pp. 486–500.

Parliament of the United Kingdom
Preceded by John Bright and William Scholefield	Member of Parliament for Birmingham; 1867–1876; With: John Bright; Philip Henry Muntz, from 1868	Succeeded by John Bright; Philip Henry Muntz; Joseph Chamberlain
New constituency	Member of Parliament for Birmingham Edgbaston; 1885–1898	Succeeded by Francis Lowe
