= 1876 Birmingham by-election =

UK Parliamentary by-election

The 1876 Birmingham by-election was fought on 27 June 1876. The by-election was fought due to the resignation of the incumbent Liberal MP, George Dixon. It was won by the Liberal candidate Joseph Chamberlain, who was unopposed.
