= Philip Henry Muntz =

British businessman and politician (1811–1888)

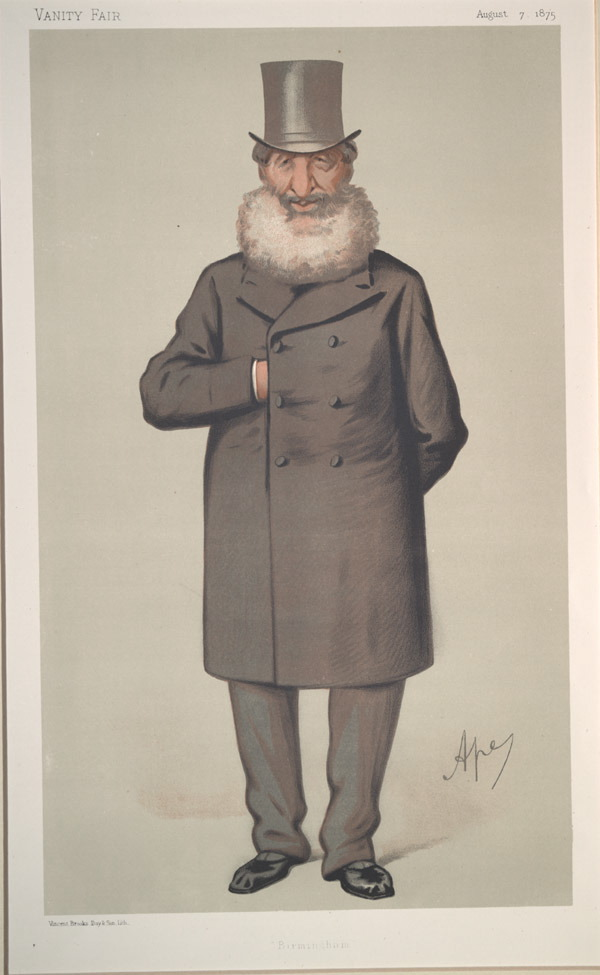
- "Birmingham". Caricature by Ape published in Vanity Fair in 1875.

Mayor of Birmingham
- In office 1839–1840
- Preceded by: William Scholefield
- Succeeded by: Samuel Beale

Member of Parliament for Birmingham
- In office 1868–1885 Serving with John Bright, George Dixon to 1876, Joseph Chamberlain from 1876
- Preceded by: John Bright; George Dixon
- Succeeded by: Constituency abolished

Personal details
- Born: 21 January 1811
- Died: 25 December 1888 (aged 77) Leamington Spa, Warwickshire, England
- Resting place: Leamington Cemetery
- Party: Liberal
- Other political affiliations: Radicals
- Relatives: George Frederic Muntz (brother)
- Education: Shrewsbury School

Philip Henry Muntz (21 January 1811 – 25 December 1888) was a British businessman and Liberal politician. He was a leading figure in the politics of the rapidly growing industrial town of Birmingham in the mid-nineteenth century.

== Early life and family ==
The Muntz family originated in modern Lithuania. Philip Henry was the son of Philip Frederick Muntz, who had moved from France to Birmingham in the late eighteenth century, and established the metalworking business of Muntz & Purden. He married his business partner's daughter Catherine and made his residence at Selly Hall, Selly Oak, Worcestershire. Philip Henry was the youngest of the couple's children, born in the same year as his father's death.

Following education at Shrewsbury School, Muntz entered business as a merchant in Birmingham. In 1831 he married Wilhelmine, daughter of J. D'Olhofen, finance minister of the Grand Duchy of Baden. They lived at Edstone Hall, Warwickshire, where they were counted amongst the landed gentry.

== Chartism ==
Together with his elder brother, George Frederic Muntz, Philip was active in Radical politics. In August 1838 they addressed a large Chartist meeting held near Birmingham. The two brothers were selected as part of an eight-person delegation to represent the English Midlands at a "general convention of the industrial classes" in London, which was to present the People's Charter to parliament.

== Mayor of Birmingham ==
In March 1837 Muntz organised a meeting to decide on Birmingham should apply for a charter of incorporation under the Municipal Corporations Act 1835. The meeting unanimously decided to begin the process of petitioning for a charter, which was granted in October of the following year. Birmingham was duly incorporated as a municipal borough in November 1838, and Muntz was elected as an alderman on the new town council. In 1839 he was elected as the second mayor of the borough, holding the office for two terms. The new town council was dismissed by many Radicals who saw it as a creation of the rival Whigs. In 1839 riots broke out in the Bull Ring, leading to the government taking over policing in Birmingham and creating a force under the control of the Home Office. The position of the Radicals on the council was undermined by the militant followers of Feargus O'Connor who advocated resisting the "government police" by armed means. When Muntz tried to chair a meeting of ratepayers on the policing situation in November 1839, he was booed and jeered. He remained a member of the town council until 1856.

== Railway interests ==
By the 1840s numerous railways were being promoted to connect the West Midlands conurbation to the rest of the country. In 1845 Muntz formed part of the committee promoting the South Staffordshire Junction Railway, in February 1846 he was appointed auditor of the Oxford, Worcester and Wolverhampton Railway and later in the year, he became chairman of the Birmingham and Oxford Junction Railway. He was also a director of the Stratford-on-Avon Railway.

== Parliamentary politics ==
Muntz's brother, George, was a Radical member of Parliament for the Parliamentary Borough of Birmingham from 1840 to his death in 1857. In 1859 a general election was called. The election was the first at which a single Liberal Party uniting the Whigs, Radicals and Peelites, stood. Muntz was appointed the chairman of the committee formed to ensure the re-election of the two Liberal MPs, John Bright and William Scholefield, for the two-seat constituency.

Under the Reform Act 1867, Birmingham's parliamentary representation was increased to three MPs. The change came into effect at the next general election in 1868, at a meeting of the Birmingham Liberal Association Muntz was chosen to contest the seat along with the two sitting MPs Bright and George Dixon (who had replaced Scholefield in 1857). The Birmingham Daily Post noted the candidacy was "approved by a large section of the manufacturers on other than political grounds. Mr Muntz, as a manufacturer himself, will represent the industrial interest of the town, which is assuredly of sufficient importance to deserve a guardian in the new Parliament". The Liberal Election Committee instituted a "Vote As You're Told" arrangement, whereby Liberal supporters were directed as to which two of the three Liberal candidates they should cast their two votes for, so successfully manipulating the limited voting system (Note: The limited voting system was intended to facilitate the representation of the minority party in any given seat, but its intention could be frustrated by the use of tactical voting. It was used in the United Kingdom between 1867 and 1885, but only in the five three-member consistituencies (Birmingham, Glasgow, Leeds, Liverpool and Manchester), and the sole four-member constituency (City of London).) to elect three Liberal MPs.

In April 1870 Muntz was appointed to the Royal Commission on the Over-Regulation Purchase System. A royal warrant of 1866 had regulated payments paid for promotion and received on retirement from the British Army: the commission was tasked with examining whether payments above these levels were being made and by whom.

Muntz was re-elected in 1874 and 1880, retiring due to age and ill health before the 1885 general election.

== Later life ==
In October 1888 Birmingham Corporation celebrated the golden jubilee of the town's incorporation. Muntz was granted the freedom of the borough in recognition of his efforts to secure incorporation and as the only surviving member of the first town council. The resolution was passed unanimously by the town council "for the invaluable privileges he had conferred upon this community through his and others' exertions, and in recognition of his subsequent services in the discharge of the duties of councillor, alderman, mayor, justice of the peace and representative of the borough of Birmingham in Parliament".

Muntz suffered a "paralytic seizure" on 5 December 1888, from which he was slowly recovering when he suffered a second attack on Christmas Eve and died at his home at Leamington Spa, Warwickshire on the morning of Christmas Day. He was buried at Leamington Cemetery on 28 December and was survived by two sons.

== Footnotes ==
Parliament of the United Kingdom
Preceded by John Bright and George Dixon	Member of Parliament for Birmingham; 1868–1885; With: John Bright; George Dixon to 1876; Joseph Chamberlain from 1876	Constituency abolished
