= Olive Township =

Olive Township may refer to:

== Illinois ==
- Olive Township, Madison County, Illinois

== Indiana ==
- Olive Township, Elkhart County, Indiana
- Olive Township, St. Joseph County, Indiana

== Iowa ==
- Olive Township, Clinton County, Iowa

== Kansas ==
- Olive Township, Decatur County, Kansas

== Michigan ==
- Olive Township, Clinton County, Michigan
- Olive Township, Ottawa County, Michigan

== Nebraska ==
- Olive Township, Butler County, Nebraska

== Ohio ==
- Olive Township, Meigs County, Ohio
- Olive Township, Noble County, Ohio
