= Fernand Olive =

French Army general (1891-1949)

- Nickname: Oliva-Roget
- Born: 5 November 1891; Bages, Pyrénées-Orientales, France
- Died: 20 January 1949 (aged 57) Val-de-Grâce hospital, Paris, France
- Allegiance: France; Free France
- Branch: French Army
- Service years: 1912-1939; 1940-1945
- Rank: general de brigade
- Units: Troupes coloniales
- Conflicts: World War I; World War II; Levant Crisis

Fernand Olive (5 November 1891 – 20 January 1949), known as Oliva-Roget, was a French Army general. He commanded the French forces in Damascus during the Levant Crisis that led to the departure of the French military from Syria in June 1945.

== Biography ==
Born in Bages, Pyrénées-Orientales, Oliva-Roget joined the Army in 1912 as a private 2nd class. By 1917, he was promoted to the rank of lieutenant.

He served with the Troupes coloniales in the French colonies of Algeria, Morocco, Levant and Somaliland.

He resigned from the Army in September 1939 for health reasons, with the rank of general de brigade. He later joined the Free French Forces and was sacked in 1941 by the Vichy Regime.

He commanded the French forces in Damascus during the 1945 Levant Crisis. On 29 May, without orders from his superiors, he ordered his troops to suppress pro-independence riots. The plunder of Damascus by French forces was internationally condemned. British forces swept in and ordered the French to cease fire - Oliva-Roget was dismissed from the army when he returned to France. He retired to Bages and died in Val-de-Grâce hospital, Paris, in 1949.
