= Olive Green =

Olive Green may refer to:

- The color olive green
  - RAL 6003 Olive green, a RAL color
- Olive Dutton Green (1878–1930), Australian artist
- Olive Green, a pen name of the American author Myrtle Reed
- Olive Green, Delaware County, Ohio
- Olive Green, Noble County, Ohio
- Olive Green, a hamlet in Hamstall Ridware civil parish, Staffordshire, England
