= William Scholefield =

British businessman and politician (1809–1867)

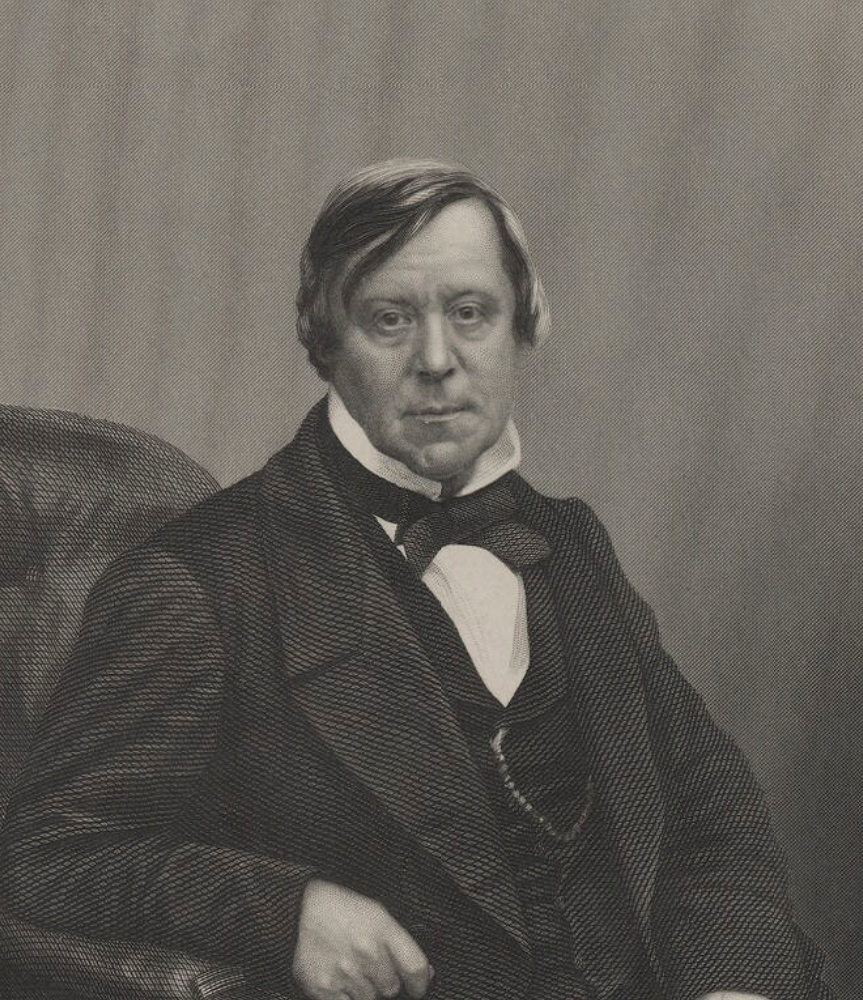
William Scholefield, 1859–1860

William Scholefield (August 1809 – 9 July 1867) was a British businessman and Liberal politician. He was a leading figure in the politics of the rapidly growing industrial town of Birmingham in the mid-nineteenth century, serving as the first mayor in 1838–39, and one of the constituency's two Members of Parliament from 1847 to 1867.

== Early life and family ==
Scholefield was born in Birmingham, and was the second son of Joshua Scholefield and his wife Mary née Cotterill. His father was an iron manufacturer, merchant and banker who became one of the town's first members of parliament in 1832. Following a number of years in Canada and the United States, where he had married Jane Matilda Miller of New York, Scholefield returned to Birmingham in 1837 to work in his father's business.

== First Mayor of Birmingham ==
In 1837 a campaign was launched to secure a charter of incorporation under the Municipal Corporations Act 1835 to create Birmingham a municipal borough with an elected town council. The government of the town was in hands of a manorial court leet, presided over by a high bailiff. Scholefield became high bailiff in 1837 and was highly supportive of the campaign to incorporate Birmingham. In October 1838 the newly granted charter arrived in Birmingham, and Scholefield was given the task of reciting the text of the charter to the townspeople. He duly acted as returning officer for the inaugural borough elections in December 1838, and at the meeting of the new town council was unanimously chosen as first mayor of Birmingham. His term of office was a difficult one, as Chartist riots in the Bull Ring led to doubts about the future of the new municipality, with the town's policing taken over by a force controlled by the Home Office. At the end of his term, he was elected as an alderman, remaining a member of the town council until he entered parliament.

== Parliamentary politics ==
In July 1844 William Scholefield's father died, causing a vacancy in the parliamentary representation of the borough. Scholefield contested the resulting by-election, but was defeated by the Conservative candidate Richard Spooner. Three years later a general election was called, and Scholefield was returned along with the sitting Radical MP, George Frederick Muntz. He retained the seat until his death, alongside Muntz (who died in 1857) and then John Bright.

In parliament Scholefield championed the expansion of popular democracy, free trade, and freedom of religion. He was one of only 12 MPs who voted in favour of the People's Charter. On occasion he found himself outside the mainstream of Liberal politics, in particular opposing the Ecclesiastical Titles Bill, and by supporting the Union States during the American Civil War.

Scholefield had a large family including his youngest son, Rev. Clement Cotterill Scholefield (1839–1904), vicar of Holy Trinity, Knightsbridge, and composer of hymns.

He died at his London residence from heart failure in August 1867. He was buried at Kensal Green Cemetery, next to his wife who had died in 1843.

Parliament of the United Kingdom
Preceded by Richard Spooner and George Muntz	Member of Parliament for Birmingham; 1847–1867; With: George Muntz; John Bright from 1857	Succeeded by John Bright and George Dixon
