= Olive Island Conservation Park =

Protected area in South Australia

- IUCN category Ia (strict nature reserve)
- Location within South Australia
- Location: South Australia
- Nearest city: Streaky Bay
- Coordinates: 32°43′17″S 133°58′06″E
- Area: 21 ha (52 acres)
- Established: 16 March 1967
- Visitors: 'very few visitors' (in 2006)
- Governing body: Department for Environment and Water

Olive Island Conservation Park is a protected area in the Australian state of South Australia associated with Olive Island off the west coast of Eyre Peninsula and which is located about 25 kilometres (16 miles) west-northwest of the town of Streaky Bay.

The land under protection was declared as a fauna conservation reserve under the Crown Lands Act 1929 on 16 March 1967. The fauna conservation reserve was re-proclaimed as the Olive Island Conservation Park in 1972 under the National Parks and Wildlife Act 1972 on 27 April 1972 to "conserve a significant Australian sea lion breeding habitat". On 19 December 1991, additional land was added to the conservation park. As of 2018, it covered an area of 21 hectares (52 acres).

The conservation park is classified as an IUCN Category Ia protected area. In 1980, the conservation park was listed on the former Register of the National Estate.

== See also ==
- Protected areas of South Australia
