= Olivi =

Olivi is an Italian surname. People with the surname include:

- Megan Olivi (born 1986), American mixed martial arts reporter
- Giuseppe Olivi (1769–1795), Italian naturalist
- Peter John Olivi (1248–1298), Franciscan theologian
- Mauro Olivi (born 1983), Argentinian footballer
- Samuele Olivi (born 1980), Italian footballer
- Luigi Olivi (1894–1917), Italian World War I flying ace
