= Joshua Scholefield =

British businessman and Radical politician

Joshua Scholefield (23 May 1775 – 4 July 1844) was a British businessman and Radical politician. He was elected as one of Birmingham's two first members of parliament when the town was enfranchised as a result of the Reform Act 1832 (2 & 3 Will. 4. c. 45).

Born in Sheffield, Yorkshire, by 1800 he had established himself as an iron manufacturer, merchant and banker at Birmingham. He subsequently became a director of the National Provincial Bank, the London Joint Stock Bank and the Metropolitan Assurance Company.

== Birmingham Political Union ==
The growing industrial centre of Birmingham had neither local government nor parliamentary representation at the beginning of the nineteenth century. Scholefield became an advocate for municipal and parliamentary reform. In 1819, he was elected to the largely-ceremonial position of high bailiff of Birmingham's Court Leet. In that capacity, Scholefield chaired a meeting of Birmingham's businessmen in January 1820 that resolved to petition Parliament to hold an inquiry into the "deplorable situation of the Manufacturing and Labouring classes of the Community and of this Town in particular; and the distressing situation to which Manufactures and Commerce are reduced".

In 1830, he was a founding member of the Birmingham Political Union, along with his close friend Thomas Attwood. Scholefield became the deputy chairman of the organisation, which campaigned for parliamentary reform. Its aims were achieved with the passing of the Reform Act 1832.

== Member of Parliament ==
The Reform Act 1832 enfranchised Birmingham as a parliamentary borough, with the right to return two members to the House of Commons. The Radicals, who were dominant in the area, chose Attwood and Scholefield to contest the seat. It was initially expected that they would contest the seat with the Tories, but in the event, the two men were elected unopposed. Scholefield was re-elected at subsequent polls and remained a Member of Parliament until his death. In Parliament, he opposed the Poor Law Amendment Act 1834 and supported the aims of the Chartists. On 24 June 1844 he became ill, apparently with a stroke, and died on 4 July at his residence in Birmingham, aged 69. He was buried in Edgbaston churchyard.

== Family ==
His son William Scholefield was the first Mayor of Birmingham, and later MP in his father's seat.

Parliament of the United Kingdom
New constituency	Member of Parliament for Birmingham; 1832–1844; With: Thomas Attwood 1832–1840; George Muntz 1840–1844	Succeeded by Richard Spooner and George Muntz
