= Olive Checkland =

English historian and writer (1920–2004)

- Born: Olive Edith Anthony; 6 June 1920; Newcastle upon Tyne, England
- Died: 8 September 2004 (aged 84); Swansea, Wales
- Education: University of Birmingham
- Occupations: Historian and writer
- Spouse: Sydney Checkland (m. 1942; died 1986)
- Children: 5
- Scientific career
- Fields: Post 19th-century relations between Japan and the United Kingdom

Olive Edith Checkland (née Anthony; 6 June 1920 – 8 September 2004) was an English historian and writer who specialised in post-19th-century cultural, economic and social relationships between Japan and the United Kingdom. After enrolling on a geography degree at the University of Birmingham, she assisted her husband Sydney Checkland in forming the University of Glasgow's School of Economic History and the couple edited a republication of the English Poor Law Amendment Act 1834 and she worked alone in researching the Scottish Poor Laws. As associate director of 19th-century East Asians, Checkland wrote five entries for Dictionary of National Biography published by Oxford University Press.

== Biography ==
=== Early life ===
Checkland was born at 20 Lyndhurst Avenue in the Newcastle upon Tyne suburb of Jesmond on 6 June 1920. She was the only daughter of the process engraver's traveller and former Royal Navy cook Robert Fraser Anthony and the housewife Edith Anthony, née Philipson. As the Great Depression affected the country, the family relocated to Birmingham, to allow her father to seek employment. Checkland was taught at a local school, and became head girl. She attained a good academic performance, and enrolled on a geography degree at the University of Birmingham in 1938, becoming the first member of her family to have a tertiary education. Checkland was active in student affairs at the university.

=== Career ===
She married the economics student Sydney Checkland on 11 September 1942 and had five children with him. Checkland cared for her husband while he was recovering from injuries sustained in the Falaise Pocket during the Normandy landings. From 1957 to 1982, she worked in partnership with her husband in forming University of Glasgow's School of Economic History and contacted faculty and senior students. Checkland arranged and managed her husband's working day, was influential in employing its inaugural departmental secretary, and worked extensively socially and academically with the university. She became involved in collecting and preserving the business records of financially insecure Scottish companies. Checkland and her family helped to shelter Hungarian and later Chilean refugees escaping the Presidency of Salvador Allende.

In 1974, she and her husband edited a republication of the English Poor Law Amendment Act 1834, followed by research on the Scottish Poor Laws. Checkland and Bob Cage wrote about the St John's poor relief experiment brought about by Thomas Chalmers in Glasgow from 1819 to 1823. The publication of her first book, Philanthropy in Victorian Scotland – Social Welfare and the Voluntary Principle, came in 1980. The book earned Checkland the Scottish Arts Council Book Award. Two years later, she and Margaret Lamb co-wrote their joint study Health Care and Social History, the Glasgow Case, and Industry and Ethos Scotland, 1832-1914 with her husband in 1984. Checkland did not collaborate academically further with her husband after his death in 1986. She learnt she could find solace and happiness in researching and writing, and specialised on post-19th-century British-Japanese cultural, economic and social relations. In 1989, Checkland's book, Britain's Encounter with Meiji Japan, 1868–1912, studied how Japan sent their finest citizens to learn manufacturing abilities. This was followed by the publication of Humanitarianism and the Emperor's Japan, 1877–1977 in 1993, which examines the good and poor behaviour of Japanese soldiers towards prisoners of war in 20th-century warfare.

Checkland, Shizuya Nishimura and Norio Tamaki co-edited the book Pacific Banking 1859-1959: East Meets West in 1994, and authored Isabella Bird and 'a Woman's Right to Do what She Can Do Well two years later. Her 1998 publication, Japanese Whisky, Scotch Blend: Masataka Taketsuru, the Japanese Whisky King and Rita, His Scotch Wife, attracted press coverage in both Japan and the United Kingdom. It discusses how Masataka Taketsuru established the Nikka whisky distillery in 1934 after visiting Glasgow from Hokkaido to learn how to distil. The final book Checkland wrote was Building Cultural Bridges in 2003, which talks about the exchanging of artistic influences between Japan and the United Kingdom. Outside of her research, she was a four-time visiting professor at Keio University in Tokyo, and, as associate editor for 19th-century East Asians, wrote five biographies for Dictionary of National Biography published by Oxford University Press.

== Personal life ==
On 8 September 2004, Checkland died of heart failure, aged 84, while residing with one of her children in Swansea. She predeceased all five of her children.

== Personality and legacy ==
The obituarist for The Times noted that Checkland sought for formality in relationships and was regularly addressed not by her forename but as "Mrs. Checkland". In April 2001, the Japan Society presented her with their annual award in recognition of her "contributions to Anglo-Japanese relations". The Checkland Memorial Fund, which was named after the historian, provides postgraduates researching economic and social history in Scottish universities with financial support. The University of Glasgow Archive Services holds a collection related to Olive Checkland. They include her personal papers and photographs relating to her work.
