= George Muntz =

English industrialist and politician

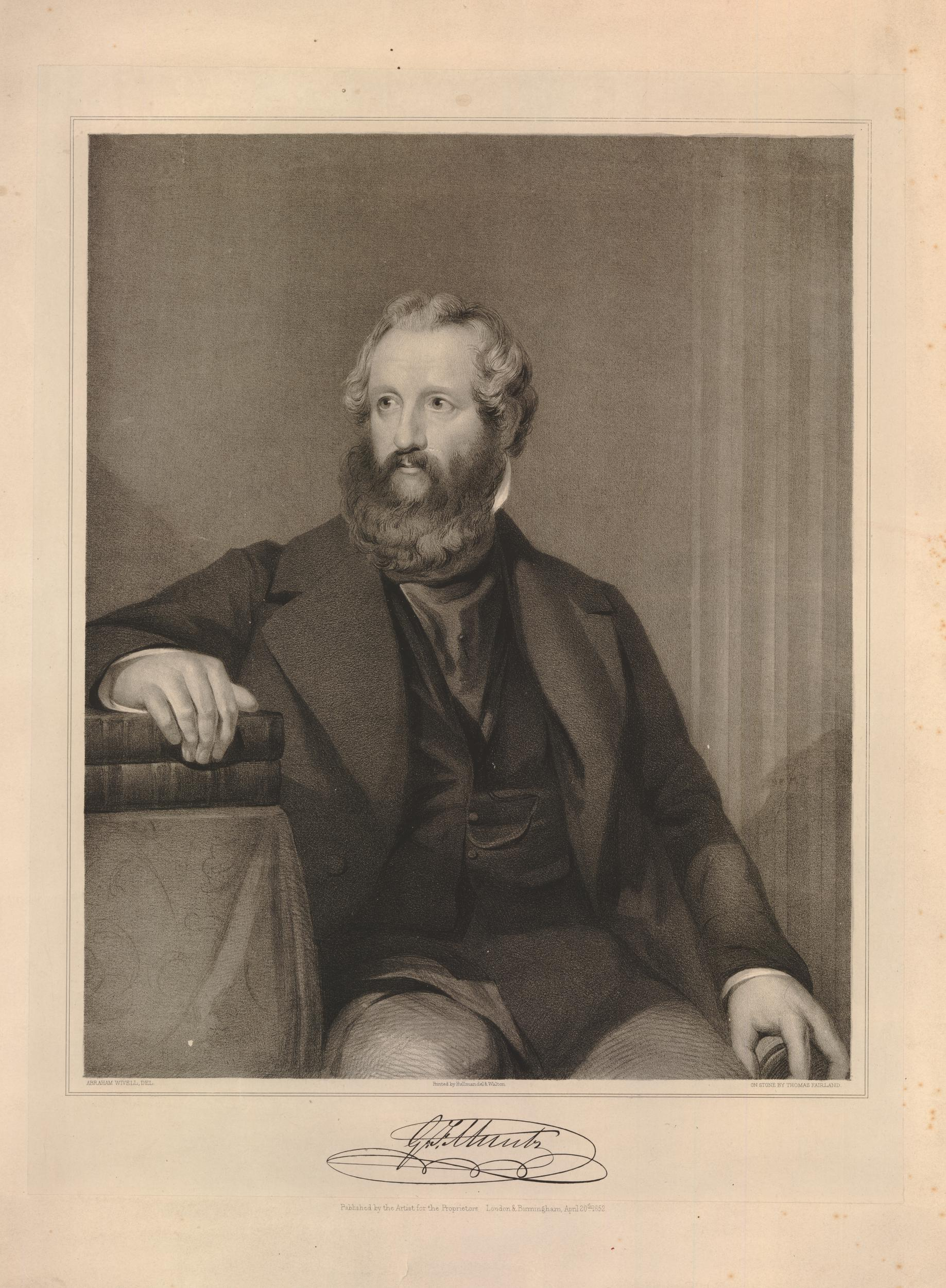
Lithograph of Muntz, after a drawing by Abraham Wivell (1852)

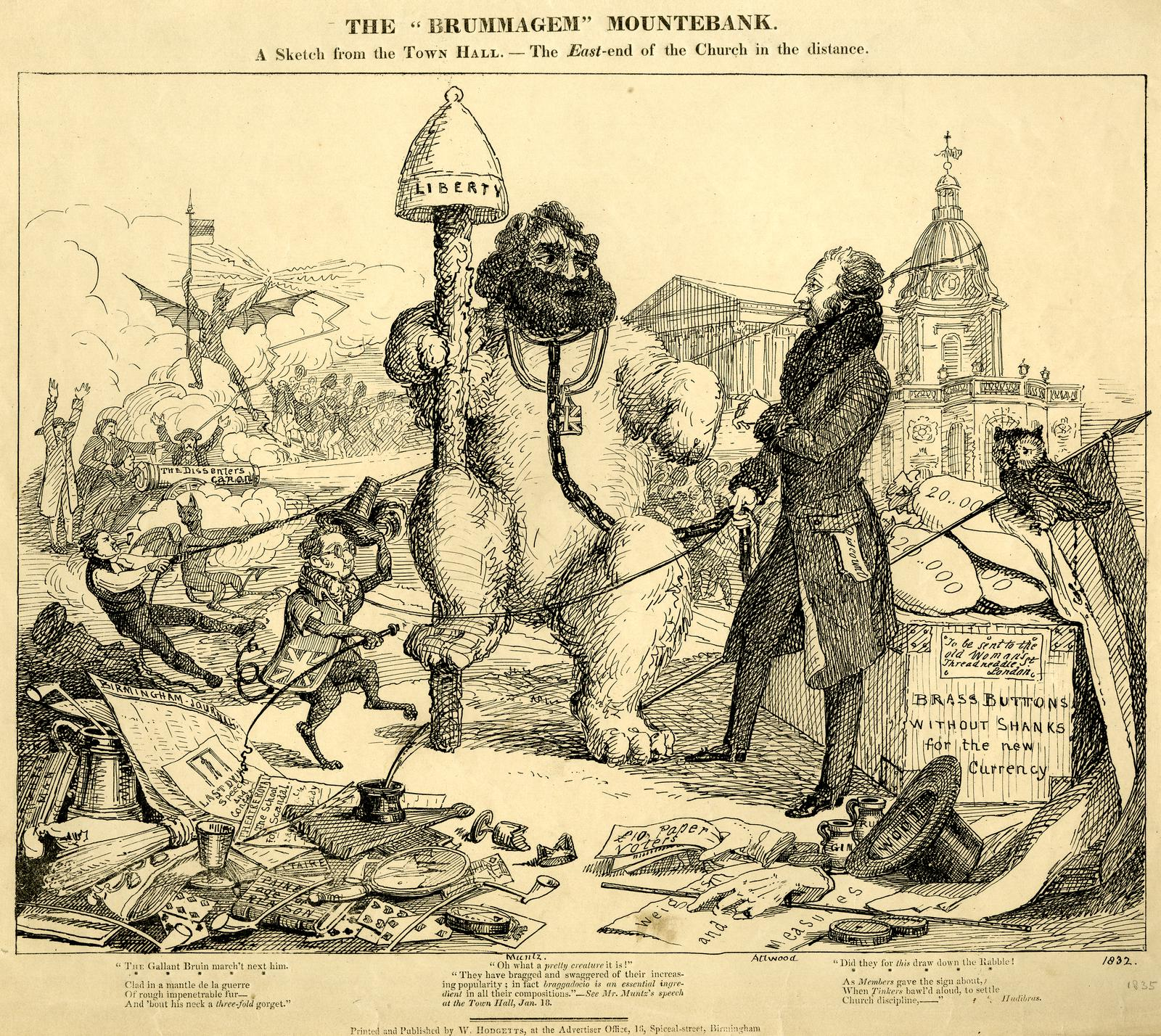
Satirical sketch of 1835, depicting Muntz as a bear, his chain held by Thomas Attwood

George Frederick Muntz (26 November 1794 – 30 July 1857) was an industrialist from Birmingham, England, and a Liberal Member of Parliament (MP) for the Birmingham constituency from 1840 until his death.

His father Philip Frederic Muntz came to England from Poland (now Lithuania) shortly after the French revolution, and lived at Selby Hall, Worcestershire. Philip Muntz established himself as a merchant and manufacturer in Birmingham, with the company, Muntz & Purden, specialising in steel toys. He married Catherine, daughter of his business partner Robert Purden, of Radford. George's younger brother, Philip Henry Muntz (1811–1888), JP, MP for Birmingham, was the first head of the Muntz family of Edstone Hall, Warwickshire. As an industrialist, George Frederic Muntz developed Muntz Metal. This was a brass alloy intended to replace the copper that was then used to prevent fouling on ocean-going ships.

Muntz was a supporter of political reform and a member of the Birmingham Political Union. In his actions that led to the Reform Act 1832, he was indicted for sedition as he tried to undermine the Duke of Wellington with a run on gold: To stop the Duke, run for gold. He also was involved in a riot at Saint Martins in Birmingham in protest against the Church Rates which were levied at around 6d to 9d in the pound. He was sent to trial in 1838, but was acquitted on all but one of 13 charges. Whilst claiming to be a republican, his true character appeared to be that of an egotistical aristocrat. Edwards wrote in 1877 of a conversation about a speech he made:

"They won't be able to print Muntz's speech verbatim." "Why not?" said I. "Why my dear fellow, no printing office in the world would have capital I's enough."

His home was at Umberslade Hall, in Tanworth in Arden. In the grounds of his estate, Muntz's son commissioned a church to be built which stands to this day, Umberslade Baptist Church. His descendants still live in the area and operate Umberslade Hall Children's Farm.

He had seven sons and two daughters. The family business was continued by the eldest son, George Frederick Jr., together with Philip Albert Muntz, also a Member of Parliament, who was created a baronet in 1902 (see Muntz Baronets). George Sr.'s brother, Philip Henry Muntz, was also an MP. One son, William Henry Muntz, designed a new type of paddle wheel.

The Muntz family are remembered by Muntz Street, a tower block called Muntz House and Muntz Park, all in Birmingham.

Parliament of the United Kingdom
Preceded by Thomas Attwood and Joshua Scholefield	Member of Parliament for Birmingham; 1840–1857; With: Joshua Scholefield, to 1844; Richard Spooner, 1844–1847; William Scholefield, from 1847	Succeeded by John Bright and William Scholefield
