= Sydney Checkland =

British economic historian (1916–1986)

Sydney Checkland FBA FRSE
- Born: Sydney George Checkland; 9 October 1916; Ottawa, Ontario
- Died: 22 March 1986 (aged 69); Cambridge
- Political party: Common Wealth Party
- Spouse: Olive Edith Anthony (m. 1942)
- Awards: Scottish Arts Council Book Award; 1972 The Gladstones: a Family Biography, 1764-1851; Saltire Society Literary Awards – Scottish History Book of the Year; 1975 Scottish Banking: a History, 1695-1973

Academic background
- Education: University of Birmingham; University of Liverpool

Academic work
- Discipline: History
- Sub-discipline: Economic history
- Institutions: University of Liverpool; University of Cambridge; University of Glasgow Visiting positions: Institute for Advanced Study; Monash University; Australian National University; Queen's University at Kingston; University of Alberta

President of the National Union of Students
- In office 1941-1942
- Preceded by: P A H Rivett
- Succeeded by: Jack T Allanson

President of the Economic History Society
- In office 1977-1980
- Preceded by: F J Fisher
- Succeeded by: Michael Flinn

Military service
- Branch/service: British Army; Canadian Army
- Rank: Lieutenant
- Unit: Manchester Regiment
- Commands: Governor General's Foot Guards
- Battles/wars: World War II; Normandy landings

Sydney George Checkland FBA FRSE (9 October 1916 – 22 March 1986) was a British-Canadian economic historian.

== Life ==
Born in Ottawa, Ontario, Checkland worked at the Bank of Nova Scotia, then the Ottawa Sanitary Laundry Company, while he gained associate membership of the Canadian Bankers' Association. In 1938, he moved to England to study at the University of Birmingham, and in his final year served as President of the Guild of Students at the university. In 1941, he was elected as President of the National Union of Students, serving for only one year before becoming President of the International Union of Students.

In late 1942, Checkland enrolled at the Royal Military College, Sandhurst, then was commissioned as a lieutenant into the Manchester Regiment, before becoming a tank commander in the Governor General's Foot Guards of the Canadian Army. An injury during the Normandy landings at Falaise left him with permanent nerve damage.

After the war, Checkland joined the Common Wealth Party and stood unsuccessfully in Sheffield Ecclesall at the 1945 general election. He then returned to study for a master's degree at Birmingham, after which he took up an academic post in economic science at the University of Liverpool, where he also obtained a doctorate. In 1953, he transferred to the University of Cambridge, then in 1957 he accepted a personal chair at the University of Glasgow and founded the Department of Economic History. In 1964, Checkland spent four months, from September to December, as a member of the School of Historical Studies at the Institute for Advanced Study in Princeton, New Jersey. He quickly developed a strong reputation in a range of fields relating to economic history, and continued to write until his death in 1986. He is credited with "being instrumental" in the establishment in 1976 of the Faculty of Social Sciences at the University of Glasgow "strong in the fields of business, banking, and urban history".

Sydney Checkland was elected as a Fellow of the British Academy in 1977, and as Fellow of the Royal Society of Edinburgh in 1981. He was a member of the Economic History Committee of the Social Science Research Council and then a Council member between 1970 and 1972. He was President of the Economic History Society between 1977 and 1980. Of his many scholarly publications, The Gladstones: a Family Biography, 1764-1851 (1971) won a Scottish Arts Council book award and Scottish Banking: a History, 1695-1973 won the History category in Saltire Society Literary Awards in 1975. Checkland also served as a board member with the East Kilbride Development Corporation, 1964 to 1968.

During his career as a historian Checkland contributed to the development of archival records. In Liverpool he collected the archives of merchant firms and he later initiated the University of Glasgow's collection of business records. He chaired of the Scottish Records Advisory Council, the National Register of Archives (Scotland) and was vice-president of the Business Archives Council of Scotland. Checkland's own papers are held by Glasgow University Archive Services.

== Family ==
Checkland met Olive Edith Anthony in Birmingham and they married in 1942. Olive nursed Sydney back to health following his war injuries. Olive Checkland was an eminent scholar in her own right in the field of social history.

Checkland passed away on 22 March 1986 in Cambridge. He was survived by his wife and their five children.
