= Thomas Attwood (economist) =

British politician (1783–1856)

Thomas Attwood MP
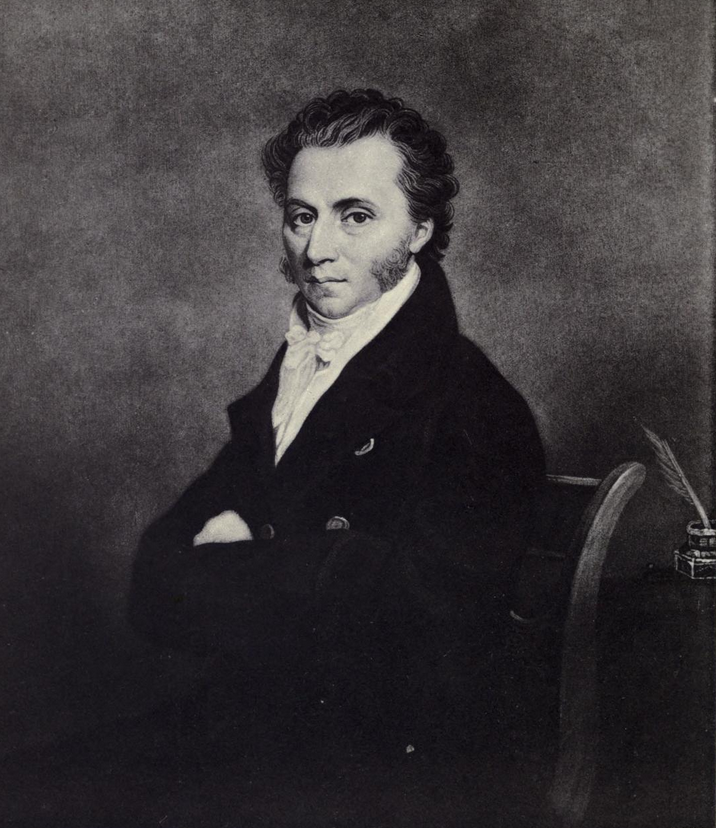

Member of Parliament for Birmingham
- In office 1832–1840
- Succeeded by: Joshua Scholefield and George Muntz

Personal details
- Born: 6 October 1783 Halesowen, Shropshire, England
- Died: 6 March 1856 (aged 72) Great Malvern, Worcestershire, England
- Spouse: Elizabeth Carless (m. 1806)
- Relations: Daniel Wakefield (son-in-law)
- Occupation: Banker, economist, political agitator, Member of Parliament
- Nickname: King Tom

Thomas Attwood (6 October 1783 – 6 March 1856) was a British banker, economist, political campaigner and Member of Parliament. He was the leading figure of the underconsumptionist Birmingham School of economists, and, as the founder of the Birmingham Political Union, the leading figure in the public campaign for the Reform Act 1832.

== Life and career ==
Thomas Attwood was born in Halesowen, then a detached part of Shropshire, and attended Halesowen Grammar School (now Earls High School) before being moved to Wolverhampton Grammar School. On 12 May 1806, Attwood married Elizabeth Carless from Lower Ravenhurst Farm, an area which is now part of the Moor Pool estate. They had two sons, George de Bosco Attwood (15 March 1808), who stood unsuccessfully for the Walsall constituency in the 1832 general election, and Thomas Aurelius Attwood (4 March 1810). Their daughter Angela married Daniel Wakefield with whom she emigrated to New Zealand.

He founded the Birmingham Political Union in 1830. This was a political organization campaigning for cities, and large towns such as Birmingham, to be directly represented in Parliament. The Birmingham Political Union was foremost among groups lobbying the government for the passage of a Reform Bill to achieve this aim. The Days of May in 1832 brought the people's struggle for wider enfranchisement to a head, and the Great Reform Act was passed on 15 May 1832. After this success he became one of the first two Members of Parliament (MPs) for Birmingham (along with Joshua Scholefield) on 12 December 1832, a position he held until 1839.

Attwood lived at The Grove, a Georgian house in Harborne, Birmingham, between 1823 and 1846. He died in Malvern, Worcestershire in 1856.

== Memorials ==
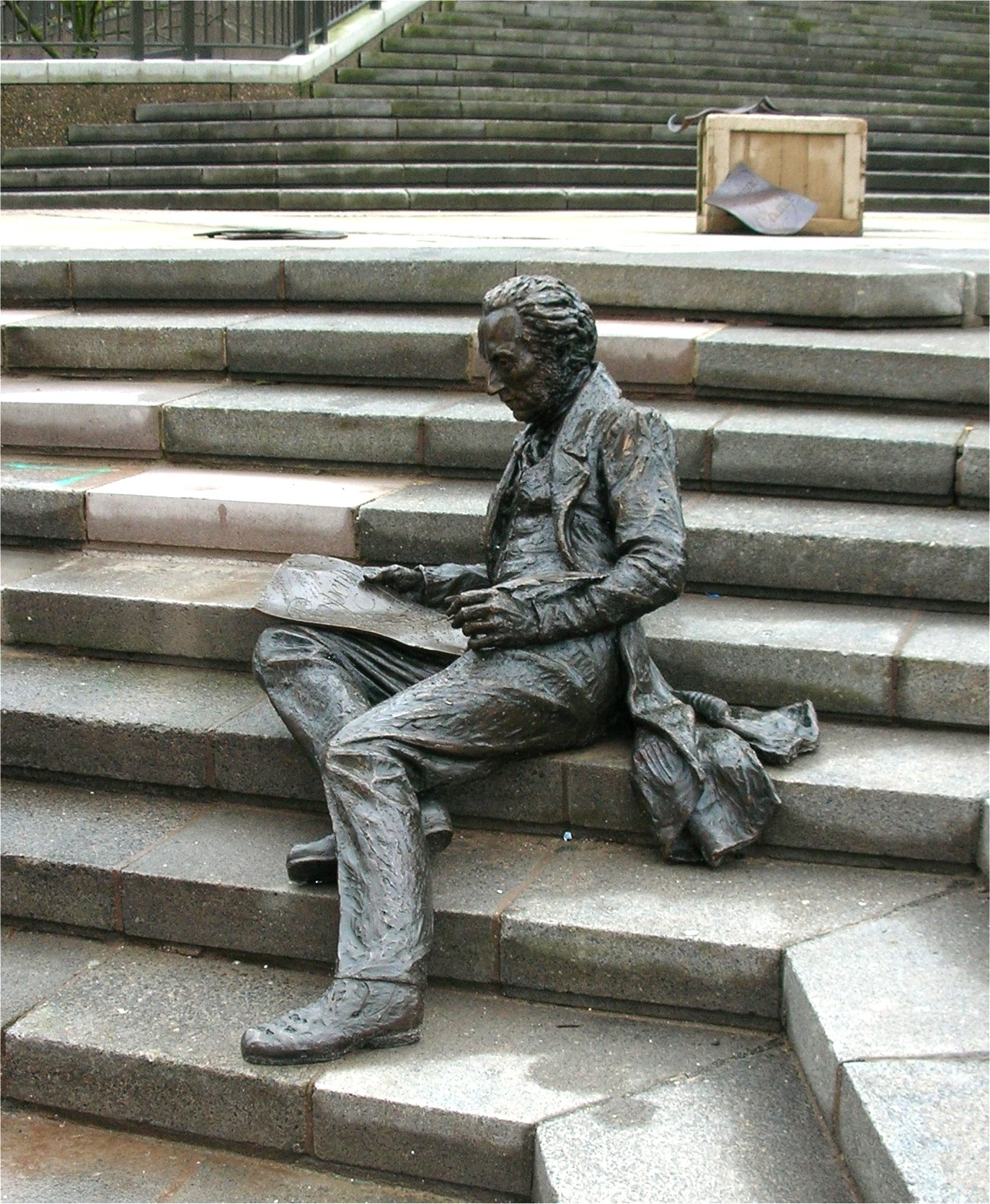
Bronze statue in Chamberlain Square

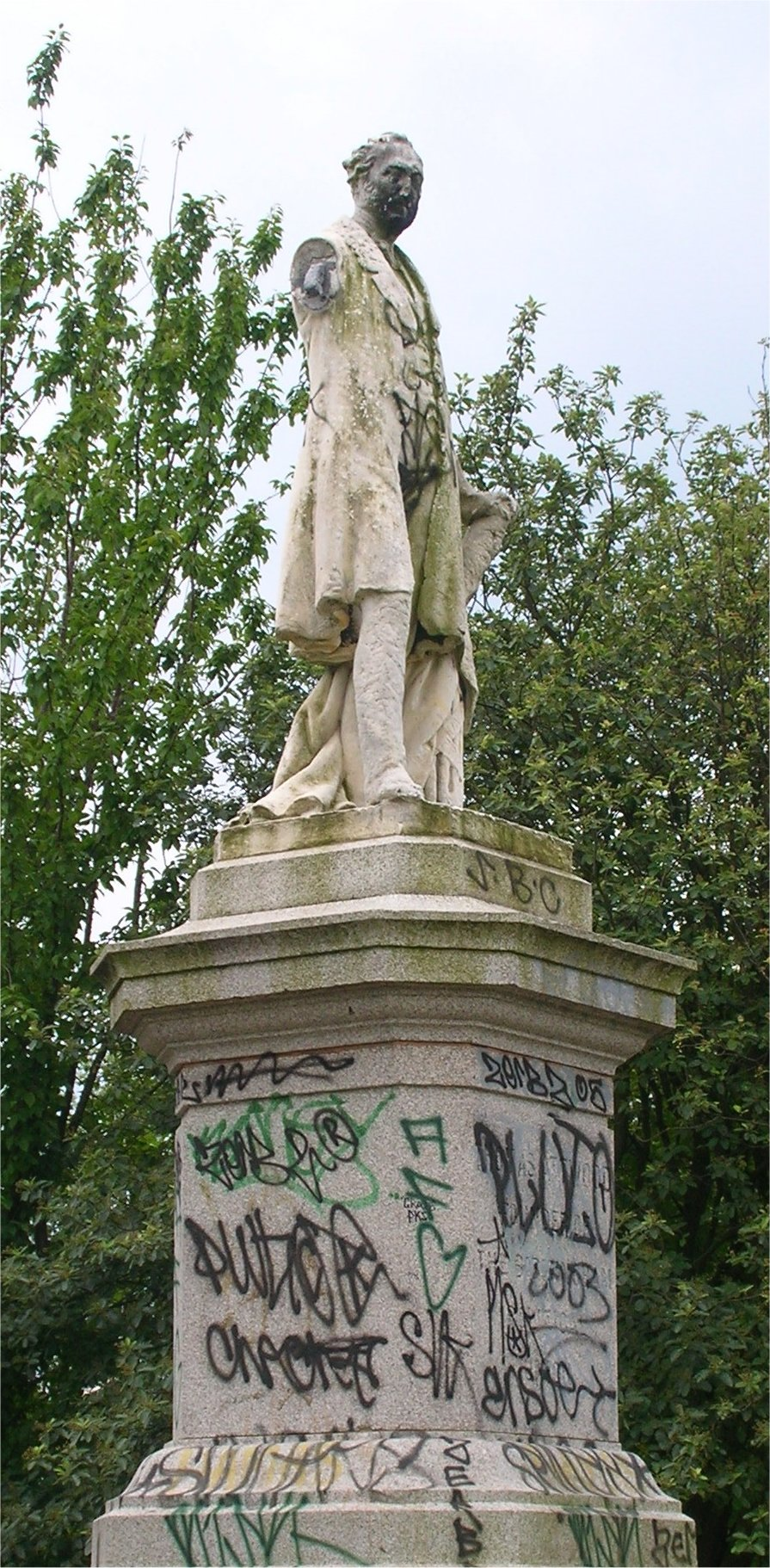
Statue of Thomas Attwood in Highgate Park, Birmingham

A grade II listed statue of Thomas Attwood by local sculptor Peter Hollins stood in Calthorpe Park from 1859 to 1974 then moved to Larches Green, Sparkbrook, Birmingham between 1974 and 2008, but is now in store. A 1993 bronze statue sat, having left his plinth, and scattered his bronze pages, on the steps of Chamberlain Square in Birmingham until 2016 when works to demolish the Central Library and rebuild Chamberlain Square began. The statue was reinstalled in 2020 once the works were completed.

Attwood Street, a residential street in Halesowen, commemorates his achievements.

== See also ==
- Peel's Bill

== Bibliography ==
- Attwood, Thomas (1964). Frank Whitson Fetter (ed.). Selected economic writings of Thomas Attwood. London: The London School of Economics and Political Science., a primary source
- Behagg, Clive. "Myths of cohesion: Capital and compromise in the historiography of nineteenth‐century Birmingham." Social History 11.3 (1986): 375–384.
- Briggs, Asa. "IV. Thomas Attwood and the Economic Background of the Birmingham Political Union." Cambridge Historical Journal 9.2 (1948): 190–216.
- Briggs, Asa. "IV. The Background of the Parliamentary Reform Movement in Three English Cities (1830–2)." Cambridge Historical Journal 10.3 (1952): 293–317.
- Corry, B. A. "Attwood, Thomas (1783–1856)." The New Palgrave Dictionary of Economics (Palgrave Macmillan, London, 2018) pp. 513–515.
- Flick, Carlos T. "Thomas Attwood, Francis Place, and the Agitation for British Parliamentary Reform." The Huntington Library Quarterly (1971): 355–366. online
- Leighton, Denys P. "Municipal Progress, Democracy and Radical Identity in Birmingham, 1838-1886." Midland History 25.1 (2000): 115–142. online
- Miller, Henry. "Radicals, Tories or Monomaniacs? The Birmingham Currency Reformers in the House of Commons, 1832–67." Parliamentary history 31.3 (2012): 354–377.
- Moss, David J. "A Study in Failure: Thomas Attwood, MP For Birmingham, 1832–1839." The Historical Journal 21.3 (1978): 545–570.
- Moss, David J (1990). Thomas Attwood, the biography of a radical. Montreal: McGill Queens University Press. ISBN 9780773562080. online
- Moss, David J. "Banknotes versus gold: The monetary theory of Thomas Attwood in his early writings, 1816–19." History of Political Economy 13.1 (1981): 19–38.
- Tholfsen, Trygve R. "The Chartist Crisis in Birmingham." International Review of Social History 3.3 (1958): 461–480. online

Parliament of the United Kingdom
New constituency	Member of Parliament for Birmingham; 1832–1840; With: Joshua Scholefield	Succeeded by Joshua Scholefield and George Muntz
