= Time Out 100 best British films =

2011 ranked list of British films

In February 2011 Time Out surveyed 150 film industry experts to produce its list of "The 100 best British films." Nicolas Roeg's Don't Look Now topped the list. An updated list was published in May 2021, retaining the same rankings but adding four films (The Souvenir, Scum, God's Own Country, and Dunkirk) in place of Listen to Britain, Penda's Fen, I'm All Right Jack, and School for Scoundrels.

== List breakdown ==
- The 1960s came out as the most popular decade, with 19 films (the 1940s and 1970s each had 17 films), and the most popular years were 1968, 1970, 1980, and 1999, with four films each. The earliest films chosen were from 1929 (Blackmail, Piccadilly, and A Cottage on Dartmoor). The most recent film was from 2009 (Fish Tank).
- The most popular director was Michael Powell, with seven films, six of which were directed with Emeric Pressburger as the team of Powell and Pressburger ("The Archers"). Alfred Hitchcock, David Lean, Mike Leigh, and Nicolas Roeg had four films each. Seven of the films were produced by Ealing Studios.

== Top 10 ==
Rank	Title	Year	Director
1	Don't Look Now	1973	Nicolas Roeg
2	The Third Man	1949	Carol Reed
3	Distant Voices, Still Lives	1988	Terence Davies
4	Kes	1969	Ken Loach
5	The Red Shoes	1948	Powell and Pressburger
6	A Matter of Life and Death	1946	Powell and Pressburger
7	Performance	1970	Nicolas Roeg; Donald Cammell
8	Kind Hearts and Coronets	1949	Robert Hamer
9	If....	1968	Lindsay Anderson
10	Trainspotting	1996	Danny Boyle

== See also ==
- BFI Top 100 British films
- Abraccine Top 100 Brazilian films
- 100 Italian films to be saved
