= Duffy (film) =

1968 British film by Robert Parrish

- Directed by: Robert Parrish
- Screenplay by: Donald Cammell; Harry Joe Brown Jr.
- Story by: Donald Cammell; Harry Joe Brown Jr. Pierre de la Salle
- Produced by: Martin Manulis
- Starring: James Coburn; James Mason; James Fox; Susannah York
- Cinematography: Otto Heller
- Edited by: Willy Kemplen; Alan Osbiston
- Music by: Ernie Freeman
- Production company: Martin Manulis Productions
- Distributed by: Columbia Pictures
- Release dates: 6 September 1968 (United Kingdom); 16 September 1968 (New York City)
- Running time: 101 minutes
- Countries: United Kingdom; United States
- Language: English
- Budget: $3 million

Duffy is a 1968 crime comedy film directed by Robert Parrish and starring James Coburn, James Mason, James Fox and Susannah York; also starring John Alderton. The screenplay was by Donald Cammell and Harry Joe Brown Jr. Originally called "Avec-Avec", French for "with-it", according to 1967 press reports, Columbia Pictures changed the title of the movie, despite the protests of the stars.

== Plot ==
Duffy is a cunning aristocrat of criminals who is hired by Stefane, a young playboy, to hijack a boat carrying several million dollars of his father's fortune. The plot succeeds, with a little help from Segolene, Stefane's girlfriend, but also with an unexpected, sudden turn of events.

== Cast ==
- James Coburn as Duffy
- James Mason as Charles
- James Fox as Stefane
- Susannah York as Segolene
- John Alderton as Antony Calvert
- Guy Deghy as Captain Schoeller
- Carl Duering as Bonivet
- Tutte Lemkow as Spaniard
- Marne Maitland as Abdul
- André Maranne as Inspector Garain (credited as Andre Maranne)
- Julie Mendez as belly dancer
- Barry Shawzin as Bakirgian

== Production ==
The script was originally written by Donald Cammell, but was rewritten. Cammell later said he thought the final film "might have been done a little better. I should never criticise other people's movies actually, because I know how hard it is to be faithful to a story, and you can actually transform a story making a film and make it much better. So anybody who tries that. I'm all for it. I don't believe in being specifically faithful to any scripts." Out of the experience Cammell met James Fox which led to the latter being cast in Performance.

Coburn's casting was announced in August 1966. He was reportedly paid $534,000 for his role.

It was shot at Shepperton Studios and on location in Almería. The film's sets were designed by the art director Philip Harrison.

Coburn, Fox and York were all unhappy with the new title. Coburn refused to do any publicity for the film until it was called Avec Avec again.

James Mason called the film "Tosh, but not unmitigated".

== Critical response ==
The Monthly Film Bulletin wrote: "When hippydom gets the Midas touch from Hollywood finance, it's predictable that the result should be embarrassing, if not downright painful. Instead of developing an interesting plot or giving the characters plausibility, Robert Parrish's film moves jerkily through a succession of set pieces – like the white Mediterranean beach-club where everyone is coloured brown and drinks Cinzanos out of tall glasses, or Duffy's pad filled with pop-art assemblages. The waves of percussive sub-Nashville music merely add to the unfortunate impression of watching an advertisement for an international brand of tipped cigarette. Only James Coburn as Duffy is a cool enough actor to be able to remark "Just do your thing, baby" and get away with it. The rest of the cast – even James Mason as Calvert – succumb to the palpable inanity of the script."

Variety felt if the film "did not try so hard in its compulsion to be supergroovy and switched-on... [it] might have been a more entertaining story... Instead, weak writing, heavy-handed direction... eliciting only tepid performances by James Coburn, James Mason, James Fox and Susannah York combine to snuff out much interest before the genuinely perky climactic switcheroo. End result is an over-produced, overlong programmer."

Filmink argued the film had "a terrific idea (upper class twits decide to rob their own dad by hiring an American) and Coburn rarely looked more handsome" but felt "The movie doesn't quite work and was received without too much enthusiasm."
