= Wild Side (1995 film) =

- Directed by: Donald Cammell
- Written by: China Kong; Donald Cammell
- Produced by: Avi Lerner (executive producer); Danny Dimbort (executive producer); Trevor Short (executive producer); Andrew Pfeffer (executive producer); Elie Cohn (producer); John Langley (producer); Boaz Davidson (co-producer); Joan Chen (associate producer) (Director's cut): Hamish McAlpine (producer); Nick Jones (producer); Frank Mazzola (producer); China Kong (co-producer); Roger Trilling (co-producer)
- Starring: Anne Heche; Christopher Walken; Joan Chen; Steven Bauer
- Cinematography: Sead Mutarevic
- Edited by: Frank Mazzola
- Music by: Jon Hassell (original); Ryuichi Sakamoto (director's cut)
- Distributed by: Nu Image
- Release date: May 1995 (Cannes Film Festival)
- Running time: 96 minutes 111 minutes (director's cut)
- Countries: United Kingdom; United States
- Language: English
- Budget: $6 million

Wild Side is a 1995 erotic thriller film co-written and directed by Donald Cammell and starring Anne Heche in her first lead role, along with Christopher Walken, Joan Chen, Steven Bauer, and Allen Garfield. It was Cammell's final film before his suicide in April 1996.

The film had a troubled production history. Cammell's original version of the film that featured a non-linear narrative was recut without his permission by the production company Nu Image, with the new cut emphasizing the sex scenes, turning it into an exploitation picture with an incoherent story. Wild Side initially was a straight-to-video release.

A director's cut was reconstructed according to Cammell's original intentions by film editor Frank Mazzola and writer China Kong, which recreated the non-linear construction, creating an avant-garde film with a new musical score. This version was released in 2000 and was well received by some critics. It is considered by many to be a cult film.

The film gained some notoriety for the strong lesbian sex scene between Heche and Chen featured in the unrated version, which the production company Nu Image used to market the film starting in 1997, during Anne Heche's famous relationship with Ellen DeGeneres.

== Synopsis ==
Alex Lee is a bank employee struggling to pay the mortgage on her beachfront home in Los Angeles. As a result, she secretly moonlights at night as a high-class call girl under the alias 'Joanna'. Her most frequent client is Bruno Buckingham, an eccentric but dangerous money launderer who enjoys engaging in sadomasochism with Alex as a dominatrix.

The paranoid Bruno suspects that there is a mole in his inner circle. Despite developing feelings for Alex, Bruno orders his driver Tony to drop Alex off one night and look for any proof of whether she is the mole. Alex gives Tony a fake address to drop her off, but he manages to follow Alex to her real residence. Surprising Alex at home, Tony ends up raping her. Afterward, he reveals to Alex that he is actually an undercover cop, and therefore the real mole. Tony ultimately blackmails Alex into helping him take down Bruno or face being arrested for prostitution.

Alex tries to report Tony's rape to one of his police supervisors. Unfortunately, the officer not only protects Tony but also subtly threatens to arrest Alex if she even files a report on the rape. She also gets no help from her boss at the bank, who is angrier about Alex being unable to land clients for the bank through her moonlighting. With no help from anyone, Alex is forced to be Tony's informant.

Tony instructs Alex that Bruno plans to move more than $375,000 of dirty money into a dummy business account set to be opened at Alex's bank for a Chinese-based company called “Foot Fetish”. Alex is introduced to Virginia Chow, the company CEO opening the account. To her surprise, the normally cool-headed Alex starts falling for Virginia, and vice versa. A problem arises when Alex learns that Virginia was actually married to Bruno at one point and is still involved with him, even though the relationship is now more of a business arrangement with Bruno using Virginia to move around his money. Despite this, the two women begin having an affair.

Meanwhile, Tony is under pressure from his police superior to finish building the case against Bruno, who is planning to use a computer disk system (through Alex) to steal large amounts of money from Alex's bank using the Foot Fetish account. Subsequently, Tony is concerned about Bruno himself, who still suspects that either Alex or someone close to him is working with the cops to take him down, despite Tony working hard to keep both Alex and him from being found out.

Still under Tony's thumb and with her bank manager threatening to fire her and keep her from finding another job elsewhere, Alex schemes to steal the Foot Fetish money herself and leave the country, most likely for Guadalajara or China. She asks Virginia to come with her, having fully fallen in love. However, when she decides to tell Virginia not only about her own relationship with Bruno but about her being forced to be an informant against him, Virginia feels betrayed, believing that Alex was only using her to bring down Bruno.

In despair, Virginia breaks up with Alex, returns to Bruno's apartment, and attempts suicide with an overdose of pills. Tony and Bruno manage to find her just in time, unconscious but still alive, though Bruno nearly has a breakdown at almost losing her.

Things come to a head during a tense dinner at Bruno's apartment. Though Bruno still doesn't know Tony is a cop, he does find out about Tony's earlier rape of Alex. He in turn (with Alex watching) forces Tony to strip down and he proceeds to simulate a similar kind of anal rape on Tony as punishment. Afterward, Tony and Bruno proceed to get drunk and spend time admiring each other's guns. Meanwhile, Alex finds Virginia in one of the bedrooms, still recovering from her suicide attempt. Seeing that Alex truly loves her and that she only lied to protect them both, Virginia forgives Alex, and the two embrace as Virginia agrees to run away with her.

Alex manages to help Virginia barely escape Bruno's apartment, and Tony's plans to arrest her along with Bruno (and likely rape her as well). Alex, meanwhile, manages to steal the computer disk Bruno was going to use for the cyber theft of Alex's bank. Tony, piecing everything together, angrily confronts Alex at her home later that night and demands the stolen disk at gunpoint. Even after giving him the disk, Tony still threatens to either kill Alex or put her away in prison as punishment for double-crossing him. Unbeknownst to both of them, Bruno also shows up at the house, having followed them. Finally realizing that Tony is the undercover cop, Bruno shoots Tony multiple times. Tony survives thanks to wearing a bulletproof vest, even though that doesn't stop Bruno from shooting the vest again in anger. Knowing that Alex is not in love with him but with Virginia, Bruno reluctantly lets her (and, by extension, Virginia) go. He and Alex hug each other goodbye, and he proceeds to make his escape in his helicopter, leaving behind Alex and a defeated Tony.

Alex transfers the $375,000 from the “Foot Fetish” account Virginia had opened into its previous bank account in Shanghai. In a voiceover, Alex reveals that she and Virginia decided to travel to Mexico by bus and, from there, sail by ship to China. The movie ends with the two women on the bus crossing the border, ready to embrace their new life together.

== Cast (in credits order) ==
- Christopher Walken as Bruno Buckingham
- Joan Chen as Virginia Chow
- Steven Bauer as Tony
- Anne Heche as Alex Lee
- Allen Garfield as Dan Rackman
- Adam Novak as Lyle Litvak
- Zion as Hiro Sakamoto
- Richard Palmer as Cop Driver
- Randy Crowder as Federal Agent
- Marcus Aurelius as Agent James Reed
- Michael Rose as Agent Morse Jaeger
- Lewis Arquette as The Chief
- Rolando de la Maza as Steward
- Candace Kita (as Candace Camille Bender) as Lotus Ita
- Philip Hamlyn as Ian Johnson
- Gena Kim as Massage Girl
- Robert Mazzola as Gilberto

== Versions ==
There are three different versions of the film. Cammell committed suicide shortly after seeing it drastically re-edited by its producers. A "director's cut" version by Cammell's wife and co-screenwriter China Kong and his editor and sometime producer Frank Mazzola was released in 2000 and was noted by critics. The film is known for its graphic lesbian love scenes between stars Joan Chen and Anne Heche. The scenes proved controversial to the point that after Wild Side's initial airings on HBO, the network subsequently chose to air a version of the film with those portions deleted.

== Cammell's suicide ==
On the night of 24 April 1996, Cammell shot himself in the head in his Hollywood Hills home. His friends told the media that he suffered from long-term chronic depression. Cammell's depression reportedly was exacerbated by the studio's recutting his recent movie Wild Side without his permission.
