= Nick Mason's Fictitious Sports =

Studio album by Nick Mason
- Released: 1 May 1981
- Recorded: October 1979
- Studio: Grog Kill (Willow, New York)
- Genres: Jazz-rock; progressive rock
- Length: 36:15
- Labels: Harvest (UK); Columbia (US)
- Producers: Nick Mason; Carla Bley

Nick Mason chronology
Nick Mason's Fictitious Sports (1981)	Profiles (1985)

Nick Mason's Fictitious Sports is the debut solo studio album by the English drummer Nick Mason, most known for his work with Pink Floyd, released on 1 May 1981.

It is Mason's first major work outside of Pink Floyd, though American jazz composer and keyboardist Carla Bley was the primary creative force behind the album.

== Writing and recording ==
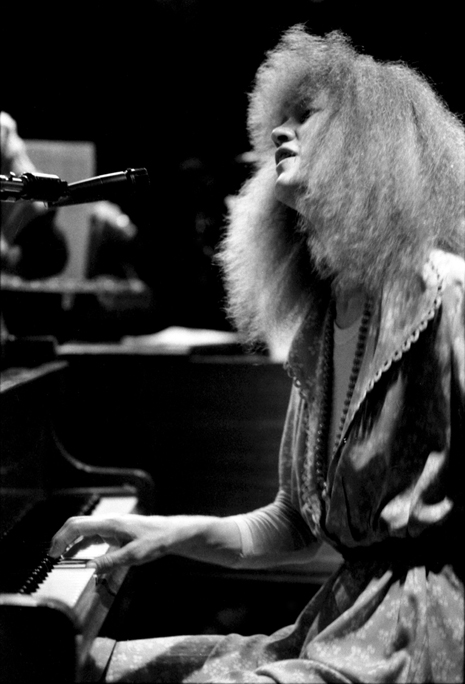
Bley performing in 1979

Though Nick Mason's Fictitious Sports was released under Mason's name, it is effectively an album by jazz composer and keyboardist Carla Bley and her ensemble, for whom Mason is merely the drummer. Bley wrote all the music and lyrics for the album. All of the songs have lyrics, which are sung by Robert Wyatt (formerly of Soft Machine) except for the first track, where Karen Kraft takes lead.

The album was recorded in October 1979 at Grog Kill Studio (owned by Bley and her then-husband Michael Mantler) in Willow, New York. The sessions took place while production for Pink Floyd's The Wall was still ongoing. The album was co-produced by Mason and Bley.

The album is more pop-oriented compared to Bley's earlier writing, with Olewnick describing its music as more rock or jazz-rock in style with humorous lyrics. Music writer Robert Palmer, reviewing the album for The New York Times, remarked that "If there's such a thing as punk jazz, this is it." Bley had herself noted punk rock as a heavy influence on the album's music.

== Release and reception ==
Despite being recorded in 1979, the album's release was delayed for almost two years, eventually releasing on 1 May 1981. The decision to release it under Mason's name has been described by critics as a promotional one to entice Pink Floyd fans to listen to the album. In the end, the album did not chart, and only developed a "rather cautious cult reputation" years later. However, despite its relative lack of success compared to Pink Floyd's work, it actually "may well be the biggest commercial hit of Bley's singular career".

The album (along with Profiles and the soundtrack to the film White of the Eye) was remastered and reissued on August 31, 2018 as part of the box set Unattended Luggage.

=== Critical reception ===
Professional ratings
Review scores
Source	Rating
AllMusic	3/5 stars

Nick Mason's Fictitious Sports has received mixed to positive critical reviews. Janne Yliruusi reviewed the album positively, praising it as one of the best solo albums by a Pink Floyd member. Brian Olewnick gave the album a mixed review, describing its music as "fairly pedestrian if occasionally catchy". At the same time, Olewnick and other critics generally praised the humor of the album's lyrics and Robert Wyatt's vocals.

== Aftermath and legacy ==
After the album's recording, Mason returned to Pink Floyd for the band's 1980–1981 The Wall Tour, and recordedThe Final Cut (1983), which would be the band's final album with founder member Roger Waters. Bley moved away from the punk-influenced sound of Nick Mason's Fictitious Sports. In reference to punk rock, she remarked: "I'm no longer infatuated with it; I'm bored to tears by the whole thing. My new songs aren't influenced at all by that scene."

The song "Wervin'" from the album was later sampled by Danny Brown for his song "Ain't It Funny" on his 2016 album Atrocity Exhibition.

== Track listing ==
All songs written by Carla Bley.

=== Side one ===
No.	Title	Length
1.	"Can't Get My Motor to Start"	3:39
2.	"I Was Wrong"	4:12
3.	"Siam"	4:48
4.	"Hot River"	5:16

=== Side two ===
No.	Title	Length
1.	"Boo to You Too"	3:26
2.	"Do Ya?"	4:36
3.	"Wervin"	3:58
4.	"I'm a Mineralist"	6:16

== Personnel ==
- Nick Mason – drums, percussion, co-producer, assistant recording engineer
- Carla Bley – keyboards, songwriter, co-producer
- Robert Wyatt – vocals (except on "Can't Get My Motor to Start")
- Karen Kraft – lead vocal on "Can't Get My Motor to Start", duet vocal on "Hot River", backing vocals
- Chris Spedding – guitars
- Steve Swallow – bass guitar
- Michael Mantler – trumpets, recording engineer
- Gary Windo – tenor saxophone, bass clarinet, flute, additional voices
- Gary Valente – trombones, additional voices
- Howard Johnson – tuba
- Terry Adams – piano on "Boo to You Too", harmonica & clavinet on "Can't Get My Motor to Start"
- Carlos Ward – additional voices
- David Sharpe – additional voices
- Vincent Chancey – additional voices
- Earl McIntyre – additional voices
- James Guthrie – mixing engineer
- Hipgnosis and Geoff Halpin – cover design
