= BFI Top 100 British films =

List of greatest British films of the 20th century

In 1999, the British Film Institute surveyed 1,000 people from the world of British film and television to produce a list of the greatest British films of the 20th century. Voters were asked to choose up to 100 films that were "culturally British".

== List breakdown ==
- The 1960s head the list with 26 films of merit for the decade.
- The most represented years, with four films each, are 1949, 1963, and 1996.
- The earliest film selected was The 39 Steps (1935), and only two other 1930s films made the list.
- David Lean is the most represented director on the list, with six films, three in the top five and The Bridge on the River Kwai in eleventh place.
  - Michael Powell follows with five entries, co-directing four of them with Emeric Pressburger as part of the Powell and Pressburger ("The Archers") filmmaking partnership.
  - John Schlesinger also directed four.
  - Alexander Mackendrick and Tony Richardson each directed three films.
- Ealing Studios produced seven films on the list, all between 1949 and 1955.
- Alec Guinness is the most represented actor, with nine films – six in starring roles and three in supporting roles.
- Julie Christie is the most represented actress, with six films on the list.

== Full list ==
Rank	Title	Year	Director
1	The Third Man	1949	Carol Reed
2	Brief Encounter	1945	David Lean
3	Lawrence of Arabia	1962	David Lean
4	The 39 Steps	1935	Alfred Hitchcock
5	Great Expectations	1946	David Lean
6	Kind Hearts and Coronets	1949	Robert Hamer
7	Kes	1969	Ken Loach
8	Don't Look Now	1973	Nicolas Roeg
9	The Red Shoes	1948	Powell and Pressburger
10	Trainspotting	1996	Danny Boyle
11	The Bridge on the River Kwai	1957	David Lean
12	if....	1968	Lindsay Anderson
13	The Ladykillers	1955	Alexander Mackendrick
14	Saturday Night and Sunday Morning	1960	Karel Reisz
15	Brighton Rock	1948	John Boulting
16	Get Carter	1971	Mike Hodges
17	The Lavender Hill Mob	1951	Charles Crichton
18	Henry V	1944	Laurence Olivier
19	Chariots of Fire	1981	Hugh Hudson
20	A Matter of Life and Death	1946	Powell and Pressburger
21	The Long Good Friday	1980	John Mackenzie
22	The Servant	1963	Joseph Losey
23	Four Weddings and a Funeral	1994	Mike Newell
24	Whisky Galore!	1949	Alexander Mackendrick
25	The Full Monty	1997	Peter Cattaneo
26	The Crying Game	1992	Neil Jordan
27	Doctor Zhivago	1965	David Lean
28	Monty Python's Life of Brian	1979	Terry Jones
29	Withnail and I	1987	Bruce Robinson
30	Gregory's Girl	1980	Bill Forsyth
31	Zulu	1964	Cy Endfield
32	Room at the Top	1959	Jack Clayton
33	Alfie	1966	Lewis Gilbert
34	Gandhi	1982	Richard Attenborough
35	The Lady Vanishes	1938	Alfred Hitchcock
36	The Italian Job	1969	Peter Collinson
37	Local Hero	1983	Bill Forsyth
38	The Commitments	1991	Alan Parker
39	A Fish Called Wanda	1988	Charles Crichton
40	Secrets & Lies	1996	Mike Leigh
41	Dr. No	1962	Terence Young
42	The Madness of King George	1994	Nicholas Hytner
43	A Man for All Seasons	1966	Fred Zinnemann
44	Black Narcissus	1947	Powell and Pressburger
45	The Life and Death of Colonel Blimp	1943	Powell and Pressburger
46	Oliver Twist	1948	David Lean
47	I'm All Right Jack	1959	John Boulting
48	Performance	1970	Nicolas Roeg and Donald Cammell
49	Shakespeare in Love	1998	John Madden
50	My Beautiful Laundrette	1985	Stephen Frears
51	Tom Jones	1963	Tony Richardson
52	This Sporting Life	1963	Lindsay Anderson
53	My Left Foot	1989	Jim Sheridan
54	Brazil	1985	Terry Gilliam
55	The English Patient	1996	Anthony Minghella
56	A Taste of Honey	1961	Tony Richardson
57	The Go-Between	1970	Joseph Losey
58	The Man in the White Suit	1951	Alexander Mackendrick
59	The Ipcress File	1965	Sidney J. Furie
60	Blowup	1966	Michelangelo Antonioni
61	The Loneliness of the Long Distance Runner	1962	Tony Richardson
62	Sense and Sensibility	1995	Ang Lee
63	Passport to Pimlico	1949	Henry Cornelius
64	The Remains of the Day	1993	James Ivory
65	Sunday Bloody Sunday	1971	John Schlesinger
66	The Railway Children	1970	Lionel Jeffries
67	Mona Lisa	1986	Neil Jordan
68	The Dam Busters	1955	Michael Anderson
69	Hamlet	1948	Laurence Olivier
70	Goldfinger	1964	Guy Hamilton
71	Elizabeth	1998	Shekhar Kapur
72	Goodbye, Mr. Chips	1939	Sam Wood
73	A Room with a View	1985	James Ivory
74	The Day of the Jackal	1973	Fred Zinnemann
75	The Cruel Sea	1953	Charles Frend
76	Billy Liar	1963	John Schlesinger
77	Oliver!	1968	Carol Reed
78	Peeping Tom	1960	Michael Powell
79	Far from the Madding Crowd	1967	John Schlesinger
80	The Draughtsman's Contract	1982	Peter Greenaway
81	A Clockwork Orange	1971	Stanley Kubrick
82	Distant Voices, Still Lives	1988	Terence Davies
83	Darling	1965	John Schlesinger
84	Educating Rita	1983	Lewis Gilbert
85	Brassed Off	1996	Mark Herman
86	Genevieve	1953	Henry Cornelius
87	Women in Love	1969	Ken Russell
88	A Hard Day's Night	1964	Richard Lester
89	Fires Were Started	1943	Humphrey Jennings
90	Hope and Glory	1987	John Boorman
91	My Name Is Joe	1998	Ken Loach
92	In Which We Serve	1942	Noël Coward and David Lean
93	Caravaggio	1986	Derek Jarman
94	The Belles of St. Trinian's	1954	Frank Launder
95	Life Is Sweet	1990	Mike Leigh
96	The Wicker Man	1973	Robin Hardy
97	Nil by Mouth	1997	Gary Oldman
98	Small Faces	1995	Gillies Mackinnon
99	Carry On Up the Khyber	1968	Gerald Thomas
100	The Killing Fields	1984	Roland Joffé

== See also ==
- Time Out 100 best British films
- Films considered the greatest ever
- BFI TV 100 – a list of the best British television programmes
- AFI's 100 Years...100 Movies
- 100 Italian films to be saved
- In 2004 the BFI compiled a list of the 100 biggest UK cinematic hits of all time based on audience viewing, the list was released as a book. The top 10 are available in this BBC News Online story.

== See also ==
- List of films voted the best
- Time Out 100 best British films
- BFI TV 100 – a list of the best British television programmes
- AFI's 100 Years...100 Movies
- 100 Italian films to be saved
- In 2004, the BFI compiled a list of the 100 biggest UK cinematic hits of all time based on audience viewing, the list was released as a book. The top 10 are available in this BBC News Online story.
