= Distant Voices, Still Lives =

1988 film by Terence Davies

- Theatrical release poster
- Directed by: Terence Davies
- Written by: Terence Davies
- Produced by: Jennifer Howarth
- Starring: Freda Dowie; Peter Postlethwaite; Angela Walsh; Dean Williams; Lorraine Ashbourne
- Cinematography: William Diver; Patrick Duval
- Edited by: William Diver
- Production companies: British Film Institute; Channel Four Films; ZDF
- Distributed by: British Film Institute
- Release dates: 13 May 1988 (Cannes); 29 September 1988 (United Kingdom)
- Running time: 85 minutes
- Country: United Kingdom
- Language: English
- Budget: £703,000
- Box office: $693,563

Distant Voices, Still Lives is a 1988 British period drama film written and directed by Terence Davies. It evokes working-class family life in Liverpool during the 1940s and early 1950s, paying particular attention to the role of popular music, Hollywood cinema, light entertainment and the public house within this tight-knit community.

The film won the Grand Prix of the Belgian Film Critics Association. In 1988 the film won the Golden Leopard of the Locarno Film Festival. In 2007 the British Film Institute re-printed and distributed the film across some of Britain's most high-profile independent cinemas, prompting The Guardian newspaper to describe Distant Voices, Still Lives as "Britain's forgotten cinematic masterpiece".

In a 2011 poll carried out by Time Out of the 100 greatest British films of all time, Distant Voices, Still Lives was ranked third. The film is now sometimes seen as one of the best films ever made.

== Plot ==
The film is made up of two separate films, shot two years apart, but with the same cast and crew. The first section, 'Distant Voices', chronicles the early life of a working-class Catholic family living under a thoroughly psychotic, abusive, violent and mostly hateful father. The second section, 'Still Lives', sees the children grown up and emerging into a brighter 1950s Britain, only a few years from rock and roll and the Beatles, yet somehow still a lifetime away.

== Cast ==
- Pete Postlethwaite as Father / Tommy Davies
- Freda Dowie as Mother / Nell Davies
- Lorraine Ashbourne as Maisie Davies
- Angela Walsh as Eileen Davies
- Dean Williams as Tony Davies
- Jean Boht as Aunty Nell
- Michael Starke as Dave
- Andrew Schofield as Les
- Debi Jones as Micky
- Chris Darwin as Red
- Vincent Maguire as George
- Pauline Quirke as Doreen
- Toni Mallen as Rose

== Production ==
In his British Film Institute Modern Classics book, Paul Farley describes the inspiration that Terence Davies used for the biographical backbone of the film:

Davies was the youngest of ten children, the baby boomer, born into a working-class Catholic household in post-war Liverpool. His father died when he was six-and-a-half, though memories of him as a powerful, domineering, violent man are vivid and, together with the love and support of his mother, form a huge tension in ''Distant Voices, Still Lives''.

Terence Davies's real-life father can be seen in a photograph which hangs on the wall in one of the film's central sequences when the mother and her three children, Tony, Eileen and Maisie, each walk out of the frame to reveal a tired and bleached photograph of their father. Terence Davies described how they chose the location for filming:

The house where I grew up was demolished in 1961. And it was unique... I was able to rebuild it for ''The Long Day Closes'', but we didn't have a huge budget for ''Distant Voices, Still Lives'', so we had to find something that looked... working class. A working-class street, and we shot in Drayton Park, but there were no cellars, so it wasn't like our house... We had to go with what was there, because we didn't have the money. So that was a practical thing.

- Kensington Street, Liverpool, L7 8XD
  - This small street of Victorian terraced houses to the north of Kensington was the childhood home to Terence Davies and his family. The Victorian houses in Kensington Street were demolished in 1961 and replaced at a later date by a low-rise Council estate and two industrial units. However, houses very similar to those in Kensington Street remain to the south of Kensington in streets such as Albany Road, L7 8RG and Saxony Road, L7 8RU.
- 47 Whistler Street, London, N5 1NJ
  - The central location for the filming of Distant Voices, Still Lives was chosen for its architectural similarity to Davies's childhood home in Kensington Street, Liverpool. 47 Whistler Street is a small terraced house in row of similar Victorian houses located in north London on the edge of Highbury Fields. The street can be accessed from the park via a small alleyway, or from Drayton Park, the main road behind the street. The houses on the west side of Whistler Street are bay-fronted and were chosen to depict the actual family home. The houses on the east side are flat-fronted and therefore rarely shown in the film sequences. However, a house on the eastern side of the street is used in the final scene where the group leave Tony's wedding celebration and walk into the darkness.
- The Futurist, Lime Street, Liverpool
  - The Futurist was the location which inspired the film's (arguably) most artistic sequence in which the two sisters, Eileen and Maisie, attend a screening of Love is a Many Splendored Thing whilst unknown to them, their brother and Maisie's husband, George, have a serious accident. The Futurist was Liverpool's first purpose-built and longest-surviving cinema, opening in 1912. It was an ornate city centre cinema with a tiled Edwardian facade and 1,029 seats in the stalls and circle auditorium – the latter richly decorated with plasterwork in the French Renaissance style. The cinema lasted nearly 70 years and closed its doors for the final time in 1982, before being demolished in 2016.
- Jubilee Drive, Liverpool, L7 8SL
  - This Victorian street in the Kensington Fields area of east Liverpool is the street where Monica (Micky) lives and begs Eileen to come and visit. "So don't be a stranger – otherwise we'll not see you till next Preston Guild. We're only in Jubilee Drive."
- Formby Sands
  - Monica, Jingles and Eileen pitch their tent at Formby sands – a scene which is used to remind Eileen of the free and happy life she lived before her marriage to Dave.
- Pwllheli
  - Although more famous in later years for the Butlins holiday parks, in the 1940s this Welsh seaside town was an upmarket location with high-quality hotels. Teenagers from Liverpool and Manchester would work in these hotels in the summer season. In the film, Eileen, Monica and Jingles are seen working as waitresses in the breakfast hall of an (unnamed) large hotel.

== Soundtrack ==
Music is central to Distant Voices, Still Lives and is a device which binds the characters and helps to give them a voice beyond their otherwise repressed lives. In Paul Farley's BFI book, Terence Davies describes the process in which music came alive in the shooting of the film.

I got my family to sing them [the songs] – on tapes. It was difficult, actually, knowing what to leave out... All the songs I'd heard them sing, that were my favourites, I put in. It was as simple as that. None of them [the actors] knew any of the lyrics. Their parents did...

Many of the songs were sung by the cast, including Debi Jones's light rendition of "Buttons and Bows" and Angela Walsh's emotional rendition of Johnny Mercer's "I Wanna Be Around". The film also features a juxtaposition of Ella Fitzgerald singing "Taking a Chance on Love" and a scene of brutal domestic violence. Musical arrangements were by Robert Lockhart.

- "There's a Man Goin' Round Takin' Names" – Jessye Norman
- "I Get the Blues When it Rains" – Marcy Klauber
- "Oh, Mein Papa" – Eddie Calvert
- "Roll out the Barrel (Beer Barrel Polka)" – Jaromír Vejvoda
- "A Hymn to the Virgin" – Benjamin Britten
- Pastoral Symphony No.3 – Vaughan Williams
- "Love is a Many Splendored Thing" – Mantovani arr. Robert Lockhart
- "Up the Lazy River" – Hoagy Carmichael
- "Galway Bay" – Tommy Riley
- "Taking a Chance on Love" – Ella Fitzgerald
- "The Finger of Suspicion" – Dickie Valentine
- "My Yiddishe Momme" – popularised by Anne Shelton
- "In the Bleak Midwinter" (during a Christmas scene)
- "Brown Skin Girl" – King Radio
- "Back in the Old Routine" – Wilson Stone
- "I Love the Ladies" (Traditional)
- "Buttons and Bows" – Jay Livingston, Ray Evans
- "If You Knew Susie" – Joseph Meyer & Stephen W. Ballantine, George Buddy De Sylva
- "I Wanna Be Around" – Johnny Mercer and Sadie Vimmerstedt, sung in the 1950s by Julie London
- "O Waly, Waly" – Peter Pears

The melody "Limelight" is also used in the film's soundtrack, played on the harmonica; this is the main theme from the Charlie Chaplin film of the same name. Also heard in instrumental form is "The Isle of Innisfree" by Dick Farrelly.

== Alcohol ==
Many of the film's most illuminating sequences were filmed in public houses. In one scene Tony orders a round of drinks from the bar and lists a number of drinks that would have been staple drinks in 1940s and 1950s Liverpool, but are barely heard of now. These include 'Mackies', 'Black and Tan', a 'Pale Ale and Lime' and a 'Rum and Pep' (Rum and Peppermint).

== Reception ==
The film won the Film of the Year, awarded by the London Film Critics' Circle and the Grand Prix of the Belgian Film Critics Association. It tied with Story of Women for the best foreign film award voted by the Los Angeles Film Critics Association.

In a 2011 poll carried out by Time Out of the 100 greatest British films of all time, Distant Voices, Still Lives was ranked third.

The Independent ranked the film at number 6 in its top 20 British films of all time.

The film received 12 votes – 11 from critics, and one from director Carlos Reygadas – in the British Film Institute's 2012 Sight & Sound polls.

On the review aggregator website Rotten Tomatoes, 79% of 39 critics' reviews are positive, with an average rating of 8.3/10. The website's consensus reads: "Bracingly original and beautifully composed, Distant Voices, Still Lives is an invigorating period drama that finds director Terence Davies in peak form." Metacritic, which uses a weighted average, assigned the film a score of 86 out of 100, based on 21 critics, indicating "universal acclaim".

=== Box office ===
The film made £480,000 in the UK.

== See also ==
- BFI Top 100 British films
