= Profiles (Nick Mason and Rick Fenn album) =

Studio album by Nick Mason and Rick Fenn
- Released: 29 July 1985
- Recorded: 1984–1985
- Studio: Britannia Row Studios (London)
- Genre: Art pop; synth-pop; instrumental rock; progressive pop
- Length: 44:10
- Label: Harvest (UK); Columbia (US)
- Producer: Rick Fenn; Nick Mason

Nick Mason and Rick Fenn chronology
Fictitious Sports (1981)	Profiles (1985)	White of the Eye (1987)

Singles from Profiles
- 1. "Lie for a Lie" Released: 1985

Professional ratings
Review scores
Source	Rating
AllMusic	3/5 stars
Music Week	1/3 stars

Profiles is Pink Floyd drummer Nick Mason's second studio album and 10cc guitarist Rick Fenn's debut studio album. It was released on 29 July 1985 by Harvest Records. The album (along with Nick Mason's Fictitious Sports and the soundtrack to the film White of the Eye) was remastered and reissued on 31 August 2018 as part of the box set Unattended Luggage.

== Songs ==
The album is almost entirely instrumental, save for two songs; "Lie for a Lie", featuring Pink Floyd's lead vocalist and guitarist David Gilmour with singer Maggie Reilly, and "Israel", sung by UFO keyboardist Danny Peyronel.

There was a time when we were considering it as an entirely instrumental album, but we had 'Lie for a Lie', which we wanted to go on, so we felt it needed another song to balance it out.

— Rick Fenn,

I've certainly enjoyed working with Rick... I think it's useful and important to change the people you work with. You get so stuck in certain patterns. You know: Roger [Waters] will do this and Dave [Gilmour] will do that and... well, you can go and make the tea, Nick!

— Nick Mason,

"Lie For a Lie" was serviced to album oriented rock radio stations in the United States and received a music video that was directed by Donald Cammell. The song peaked at No. 21 on the Billboard Top Rock Tracks chart for the week ending 31 August 1985.

== Track listing ==
All tracks are written by Rick Fenn and Nick Mason, except where noted.

Side one
No.	Title	Writer(s)	Length
1.	"Malta"		6:00
2.	"Lie for a Lie"	Penn; Mason; Danny Peyronel	3:16
3.	"Rhoda"		3:22
4.	"Profiles Part 1/Profiles Part 2"		9:58

Side two
No.	Title	Writer(s)	Length
1.	"Israel"	Fenn; Peyronel	3:30
2.	"And the Address"		2:45
3.	"Mumbo Jumbo"		3:53
4.	"Zip Code"		3:05
5.	"Black Ice"		3:37
6.	"At the End of the Day"		2:35
7.	"Profiles Part 3"		1:55
Total length:			44:10

== Non-album track ==
1. "Lie for a Lie" (Fenn, Mason, Peyronel) (12" Mix) – 5:54

== Personnel ==
Credits are adapted from the Profiles liner notes.

Musicians

- Nick Mason — drums, keyboards, percussion, composing
- Rick Fenn — guitars, keyboards, composing
- Mel Collins — saxophone on "Rhoda", "And the Address", "Mumbo Jumbo", and "Black Ice"
- David Gilmour — vocals on "Lie for a Lie"
- Maggie Reilly — vocals on "Lie for a Lie"
- Danny Peyronel — vocals on "Israel"
- Craig Pruess — Emulator brass on "Malta"
- Aja Fenn — keyboard intro on "Malta"
