= Frank Mazzola =

American film editor and actor (1935–2015)

- Born: Francisco Mazzola; March 7, 1935; Los Angeles, California, U.S.
- Died: January 13, 2015 (aged 79); Los Angeles, California, U.S.
- Occupations: Film editor; actor

Francisco "Frank" Mazzola (March 7, 1935 – January 13, 2015) was an American film editor and actor, best known for his work with director Donald Cammell.

== Life and career ==
Mazzola was born in Los Angeles, California. His father was in movies in the silent era. As a child and young adult, Mazzola worked as an actor.

=== Rebel Without a Cause ===
His knowledge of the LA youth culture and gang life led him to be hired as a technical advisor for the classic James Dean film Rebel Without a Cause. According to the Associated Press,

"[Mazzola] helped scriptwriter Stewart Stern work dozens of street slang expressions into the film, and Mazzola took Dean to meet the Athenians, the Hollywood street gang he hung with. Mazzola’s group would teach the actor how to fight and walk tough. When it came time to choreograph the famous fight scene, Mazzola showed Dean how to hold a knife in one hand and wrap his jacket around the other like a real street fighter would to keep from being stabbed."

Mazzola also chose the 1949 Mercury Eight Coupe driven by Dean's character, and inspired Dean's signature red jacket. Impressing director Nicholas Ray, he was hired to play a supporting role as "Crunch". At the time of his death in 2015, he was one of the last surviving cast members from that film.

=== Editor ===
In 1966, Mazzola started editing films, as an assistant to Oscar-winner Ralph E. Winters. He worked with director Donald Cammell on three of his four feature films: Performance (1970 - uncredited), Demon Seed (1977), and the director's cut of Wild Side (1995). He pioneered the non-linear editing style in Performance and other Cammell films, as well as the lyrical style that is found in The Hired Hand; he also edited the well-received "director's cut" of Wild Side that was released four years after Cammell's 1996 death.

== Death ==
Mazzola died on January 13, 2015, at the age of 79.

== Filmography ==
=== Film ===
==== Editor ====
Year	Title	Director	Notes
1966	Hawaii	George Roy Hill	Assistant editor
1967	Fitzwilly	Delbert Mann	Assistant editor
1968	The Party	Blake Edwards	Assistant editor
1968	How Sweet It Is!	Jerry Paris	Montage sequence editor
1969	Stiletto	Bernard L. Kowalski	
1970	Macho Callahan	Bernard L. Kowalski	with Jerry Taylor and Fabien D. Tordjmann
1970	Performance	Donald Cammell; Nicolas Roeg	with Antony Gibbs and Brian Smedley-Aston
1971	The Hired Hand	Peter Fonda	
1974	The Second Coming of Suzanne	Michael Barry	
1975	Poor Pretty Eddie	David Worth; Richard Robinson	
1977	Demon Seed	Donald Cammell	
1979	The Fish That Saved Pittsburgh	Gilbert Moses	with Peter Zinner
1984	The Secret Diary of Sigmund Freud	Danford B. Greene	
1990	Instant Karma	Roderick Taylor	
1991	Nowhere Man	Naoto Takenaka	with Yoshiyuki Okuhara
1995	Wild Side	Donald Cammell	Director's cut only
1996	Somebody Is Waiting	Martin Donovan	Director's cut only

==== Acting roles ====
Year	Title	Role	Director	Notes
1939	The Hunchback of Notre Dame	Child Extra	William Dieterle	Uncredited
1942	Always in My Heart	Boy	Jo Graham	Uncredited
1942	Casablanca	Moroccan Boy	Michael Curtiz	Uncredited
1948	The Boy with Green Hair	Boy	Joseph Losey	Uncredited
1953	Torch Song	Merle	Charles Walters	Uncredited
1955	East of Eden	Student	Elia Kazan	Uncredited
1955	Rebel Without a Cause	Crunch	Nicholas Ray	
1956	Hot Blood	Gypsy	Nicholas Ray	Uncredited
1957	The Way to the Gold	Teenager	Robert D. Webb	

=== Television ===
==== Editor ====
Year	Title	Director	Notes
1978	A Woman Called Moses	Paul Wendkos	Miniseries; 3 episodes
1986	Annihilator	Michael Chapman	TV film
1987	Amerika	Donald Wrye	Miniseries; 3 episodes
