= Bill Mason (director) =

English film director (1915–2002)

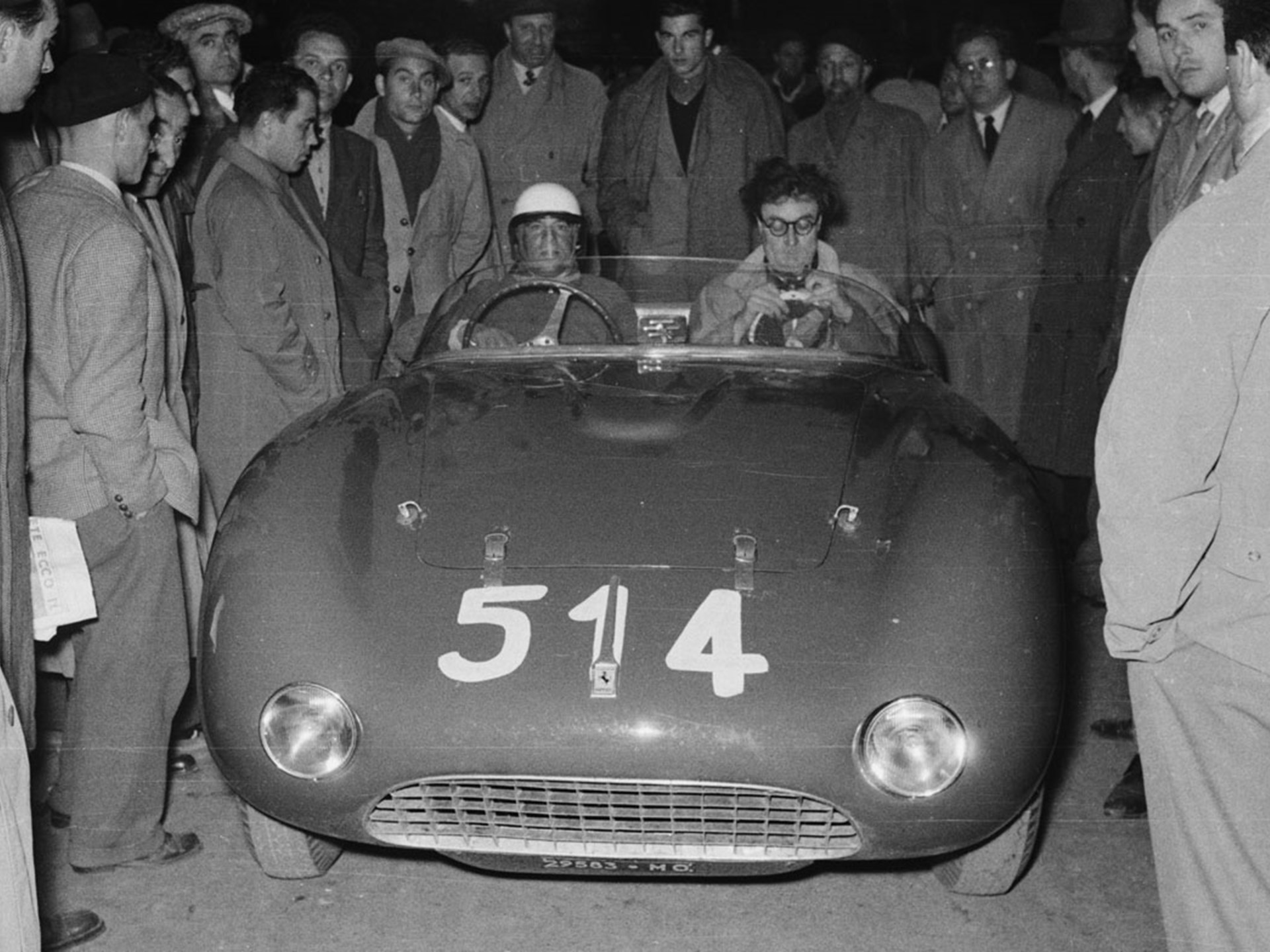
Mason (right) making a documentary of the 1953 Mille Miglia endurance race in Italy 25–26 April 1953, here sitting in the Ferrari 166 MM with owner and driver Alberico Cacciari.

Rowland Hill Berkeley Mason (9 November 1915 – 17 January 2002), better known as Bill Mason, was an English documentary film maker and scriptwriter.

== Life ==
Mason was born in Kings Norton, Birmingham, England to Elsie Ann (née Berkeley) and Edward Daniel Mason; Elsie's father Rowland Hill Berkeley had been Lord Mayor of Birmingham in 1904-1905.

Mason was educated at Gresham's School, Holt, between 1929 and 1934. After six months as a stockbroker, he went up to Christ's College, Cambridge, where he read English and joined the Cambridge University Film Society.

In the 1940s, he moved to Hampstead Heath, London, with his wife and son Nick Mason, who became the drummer of Pink Floyd. A filmmaker and amateur racing car driver, because of a lifelong passion for motor sports Bill Mason specialized in observing them as a maker of documentary films. His enthusiasm for the world of motoring was passed on to his son Nick, who wrote about them in his book Into the Red (2004). Mason's success was such that Nick was given an Aston Martin sports car as a teenager.

As well as making films, Mason was also a scriptwriter.

== Filmography as director ==
- Le Mans 1952 (1952)
- Mille miglia (1953)
- History of the Motor Car (1972)
- Racing Mercedes - Part One (2001)
- Racing Mercedes - Part Two (2001)
- Racing Mercedes - Part Three (2001)
