= Rowland Hill Berkeley =

English grocer and politician (1849–1905)

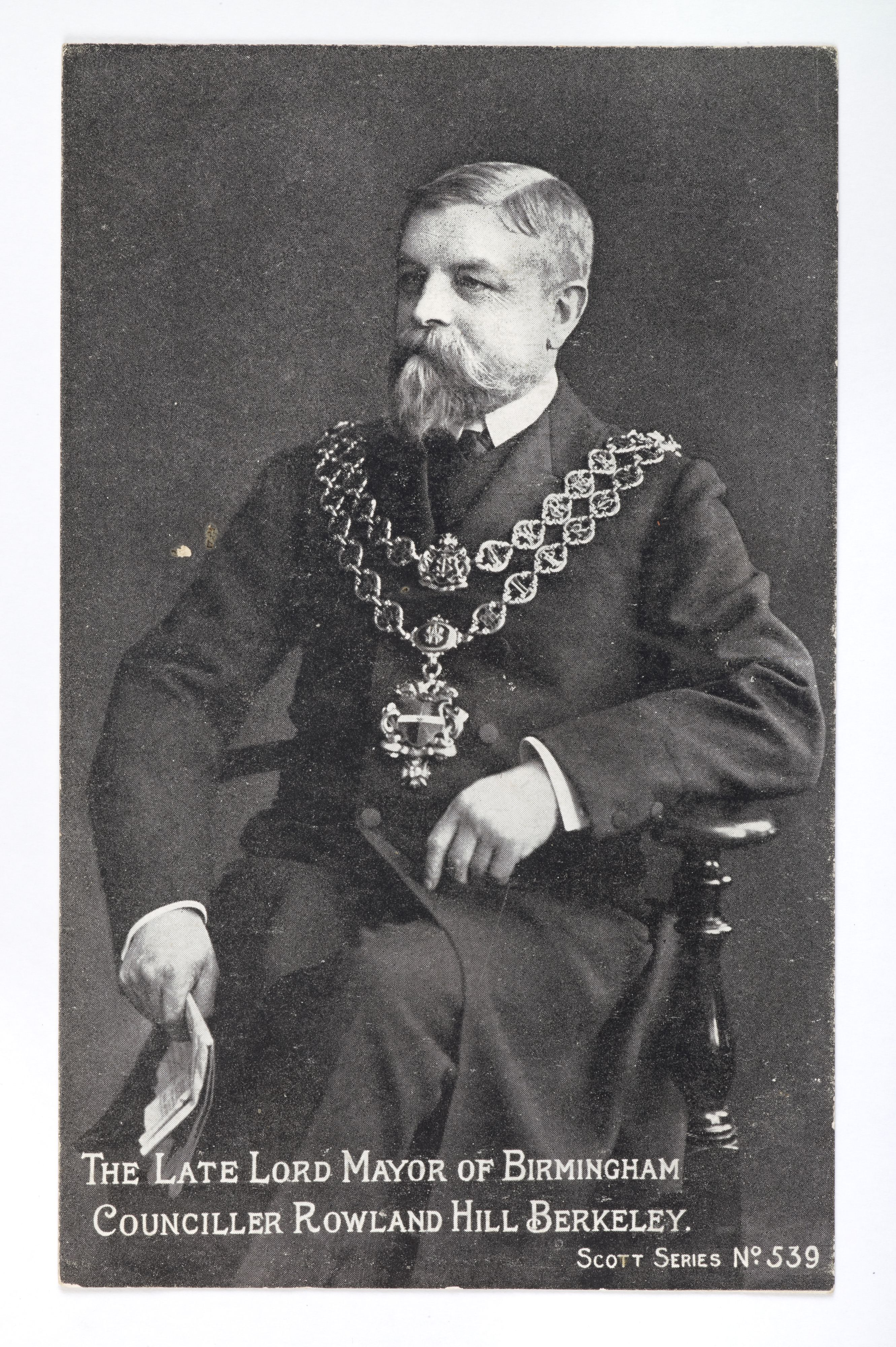
- Born: 1849; Handsworth
- Died: 13 April 1905; Birmingham
- Occupations: Politician, grocer, factory owner
- Children: Elsie Ann Berkeley

Rowland Hill Berkeley, J.P. (1849 – 13 April 1905) was an English grocery merchant, factory owner and Liberal Unionist politician, who served as Lord Mayor of Birmingham, dying in office.

== Life ==
Berkeley was born in late 1849 in Handsworth (then a village in Staffordshire, now a suburb of Birmingham), to Ann (née Hill) and John Berkeley, a coal dealer, both from Worcestershire.

He apprenticed as a grocer in Ashted Row, Birmingham, then set up his own grocery business, eventually operating throughout the city and neighbouring towns of West Bromwich and Walsall. He took up several directorships, including of Birmingham's Grand Hotel. He also owned the metal toy factory previously operated by Messrs. Hull and Collett.

He held a patent, for "Improvements in coal tongs, ice tongs, sugar tongs, fire iron tongs, and other like tongs" and petitioned for another, for the invention of "A new or improved hydraulic apparatus for drawing corks."

== Politics ==
Berkeley served on Birmingham City Council, being elected unopposed to Duddeston ward for the Liberal Unionist Party on 21 November 1892, having earlier served as chair of the Duddeston Ward Liberal Unionist Association. He served on the council's Gas Committee and chaired its Lunatic Asylum Commission of Visitors. In the latter role, he was instrumental in the creation of Hollymoor Lunatic Asylum — its official opening was postponed due to his death. He was appointed Lord Mayor in 1904.

He was also Birmingham's chief magistrate.

== Death ==
During the afternoon of 13 April 1905, Berkeley — a man generally in good health — complained of feeling unwell. He nonetheless continued to work, then attended the induction of a new rector, Denton Thompson, at St Martin in the Bull Ring with his wife and one daughter. He died at his home at 93, Harborne Road, Birmingham, (Note: The house still stands, and is a Grade II listed building (coordinates: 52.470156°N 1.927270°W)) that evening from "apoplexy" (now known as a haemorrhagic stroke), within minutes of collapsing. His dinner guests at the time included Edmund Whitcombe, superintendent of the Birmingham City Asylum, and the Berkeley's family physician and next-door neighbour, Dr Huxley, who despite their efforts were unable to revive him. On the evidence of these two medical men, the city coroner decided that no inquest would be necessary.

A commemorative service was subsequently held at the non-conformist Carr's Lane Chapel, where Berkeley had worshipped.

Obituaries were published in local newspapers, and in The Journal of Gas Lighting, Water Supply & Sanitary Improvement.

Former Lord Mayor Charles Gabriel Beale was returned to the post for what should have been the remainder of Berkeley's tenure.

== Personal life ==
Berkeley married Eliza, née Jeffrey, and they had two daughters, Elsie Ann and Kate. All survived him. Eliza lived into her nineties, dying during World War II.

Elsie (died 1967) married Edward Daniel Mason (died 1968) in 1911. Their son, Rowland Hill Berkeley Mason, known as Bill, was a successful documentary film director, and father of Nicholas Berkeley Mason, drummer in Pink Floyd.
