= Inside Out: A Personal History of Pink Floyd =

2004 memoir by Nick Mason

- 2004 edition
- Author: Nick Mason
- Audio read by: Nick Mason
- Cover artist: Storm Thorgerson (2004 edition)
- Genre: Memoir
- Publisher: Weidenfeld & Nicolson Illustrated
- Publication date: 7 October 2004
- Pages: 360
- ISBN: 0-7538-1906-6

Inside Out: A Personal History of Pink Floyd is drummer Nick Mason's personal memoir of Pink Floyd, published on 7 October 2004, in the United Kingdom. Initially a hardback release, it has since appeared in at least two different paperback editions. The book marks the first time that a group member has written a recollection of his experiences of life in the band. Mason – the only member of the band to have been a part of it in all incarnations and line-ups – covers Floyd's entire career, from the initial coming together and the Syd Barrett–led psychedelic era of the late 1960s through their success in the 1970s to the present day, via the acrimonious splits of the 1980s.

As of 2005, a new paperback version was available, now including an updated section on the band's reunion at Live 8. A second paperback edition was released, mentioning the death of Barrett, in 2006. A third paperback edition was released in 2011, mentioning the death of keyboardist Rick Wright. The book was updated and reissued again in 2017, to accompany the opening of the exhibition Their Mortal Remains at the Victoria and Albert Museum in London.

There is also an abridged, three-CD audio version, read by Mason.

Inside Out was featured in a Top Gear episode where Mason agreed to lend his Enzo Ferrari to the programme-makers in return for Inside Out's promotion.
