= White of the Eye =

1987 film by Cassian Elwes, Donald Cammell

- Film poster
- Directed by: Donald Cammell
- Screenplay by: Donald Cammell; China Cammell
- Based on: Mrs. White by Andrew Klavan
- Produced by: Sue Baden-Powell; Cassian Elwes; Elliott Kastner; Brad Wyman
- Starring: David Keith; Cathy Moriarty; Art Evans
- Cinematography: Larry McConkey
- Edited by: Terry Rawlings
- Music by: Rick Fenn; Nick Mason
- Production company: Mrs. White's Productions
- Distributed by: Cannon Films
- Release dates: 9 May 1987 (Cannes); 20 May 1988 (United States)
- Running time: 111 minutes
- Country: United Kingdom
- Language: English
- Budget: $2.8 million

White of the Eye is a 1987 British horror-thriller film directed by Donald Cammell, starring David Keith and Cathy Moriarty. It was adapted by Cammell and his wife China Kong from the 1983 novel Mrs. White, written by Margaret Tracy (pseudonym of the brothers Laurence and Andrew Klavan).

== Plot ==
A series of murders of rich young women throughout the area of Globe, Arizona, bear the distinctive signature of a serial killer. Clues lead Detective Charles Mendoza to Paul White, a sound expert installing hi-fi systems in wealthy people's homes. His special talent is to make a noise which echoes through the air cavities in his head and shows him where the sound of the speakers should come from and echo in the room. He is married to Joan, whom, ten years earlier, he had seduced away from Mike DeSantos, who was her then-boyfriend. Paul and Joan have a daughter, Danielle.

Paul, installing equipment at Dr. Sutter's home, proximal to the most-recent murder, is approached by Mendoza—they have a cordial conversation about sound equipment, but it turns abruptly when Mendoza asks Paul if he still hunts. Mendoza questions Paul about whether he knew the victim, and then asks him about the tires on his van—a tread pattern that has been located at the scene of the murder. At the police station, Mendoza's partner Phil has uncovered Paul's criminal record—they speculate on what kind of person he might be based on that information. Mendoza, working from photos of the crime scene, begins to identify some aspects of the killer's modus operandi.

Various flashbacks show Joan's previous relationship to Mike, traveling across the country from New York City in Mike's van, heading for Malibu. The couple met Paul, whom Mike befriended. At Mike's suggestion, the two men go on a deer hunting trip together. Paul shoots a deer and then brutally mutilates it, winding up with blood all over his face, revealing a frightening and incongruous aspect to his personality. Mike later catches Joan and Paul having sex. He puts a gun to the back of Paul's head but relents and leaves.

In the present-day, Joan, on her way to Stope's Creek, stops in a gas station asking for directions. As she walks around the building to the restroom, she hears a voice singing a familiar song—Mike. As they sit and catch up, Mike mentions that he's been in prison and that he received a serious head injury which seems to have given him the ability to see the past and the future. He emphatically asks Joan to promise not to tell Paul that she has seen him.

Joan suspects that Paul is having an affair with Ann Mason, a local married socialite, when she finds his truck parked behind her house. She stabs his tires flat, which winds up providing him with an alibi for the most-recent murder which happened down the road at the same time. Distraught, Joan runs to her home bathroom to vomit and notices some twine poking out from underneath the raised bathtub. She pries the inlaid soap-dish loose and looks underneath, finding plastic bags with body parts inside. Joan confronts Paul, who explains he has been "chosen" to put women "out of their misery," but he loves Joan.

Joan's continuing distrust of Paul agitates him into a fury. He locks her up in the attic, then dons an explosive vest and facepaint. Increasingly unhinged, Paul chases his daughter up through the attic, and minutes after accusing Joan of thinking that he'd "hurt my own kid," attempts target practice of her fleeing form, missing Danielle, but killing their dog Shasta. Joan and the little girl escape in different directions and soon Joan has to elude Paul in the abandoned quarry. It turns out Mike has been staying there, armed with a machine gun, certain that he will meet Paul again. He rescues Joan and takes away Paul's gun, leading him to the edge of the quarry. Paul makes the sound he uses in the emptiness of living rooms and savors its echo from the quarry. While incessantly pontificating about his philosophies of life and death, Paul reveals a lighter with which he has lit the fuse of his explosive vest. Mike opens fire on him with a machine gun and Joan dives into the lake in the quarry. Paul and Mike both die instantly, in a hail of destruction. Joan is reunited later with her daughter. She talks with Detective Mendoza about what the ten years with Paul could have meant, whose destructive and nihilistic nature she never realized.

== Cast ==
- David Keith as Paul White
- Cathy Moriarty as Joan White
- Alan Rosenberg as Mike DeSantos
- Art Evans as Detective Charles Mendoza
- Michael Greene as Phil Ross
- Danielle Smith as Danielle White
- Alberta Watson as Ann Mason
- William G. Schilling as Harold Gideon
- David Chow as Fred Hoy
- Marc Hayashi as Stu
- Mimi Lieber as Liza Manchester
- Pamela Seamon as Caryanne
- Bob Zache as Lucas Herman
- Danko Gurovich as Arnold White
- China Cammell as Ruby Hoy
- Richard Lester (uncredited) as Tucson detective

== Soundtrack ==
White of the Eye

Soundtrack album / Studio album by Nick Mason and Rick Fenn
- Released: 31 August 2018
- Recorded: 1986
- Genres: Instrumental rock; progressive rock
- Length: 43:10
- Label: Parlophone
- Producers: Rick Fenn; Nick Mason

Nick Mason and Rick Fenn chronology
Profiles (1985)	White of the Eye (2018)	Tank Malling (1989)

The soundtrack album for White of the Eye features 10cc's Rick Fenn and Pink Floyd's Nick Mason. This album was remastered and released digitally and as a part of the Unattended Luggage CD/vinyl box set on 31 August 2018.

1. "Goldwaters"
2. "Remember Mike"
3. "Where Are You Joany?"
4. "Dry Junk"
5. "Present"
6. "The Thrift Store"
7. "Ritual"
8. "Globe"
9. "Discovery and Recoil"
10. "Anne Mason"
11. "Mendoza"
12. "World of Appearances"
13. "Sacrifice Dance"
14. "White of the Eye"

== Reception ==
On Rotten Tomatoes, the film holds an approval rating of 50% based on 8 reviews. In The Spectator the author and critic Hilary Mantel described it as "A violent and ambitious thriller."
