= Donald Cammell =

British film director (1934–1996)

- Born: Donald Seton Cammell; 17 January 1934; Edinburgh, Scotland
- Died: 24 April 1996 (aged 62); Los Angeles, California, U.S.
- Education: Royal Academy of Arts
- Occupations: Film director; screenwriter; painter
- Spouses: Maria Andipa (m. 1954): China Kong (m. 1978)
- Children: Amadis Cammell (b. 1959)

Donald Seton Cammell (17 January 1934 – 24 April 1996) was a Scottish painter and filmmaker. He is best known for his 1970 debut film Performance, which he wrote the screenplay for and co-directed with Nicolas Roeg. He died by suicide after the last film he directed, Wild Side, was taken away from him and recut by the production company. The British Film Institute posthumously referred to him as a "true visionary".

== Early years ==
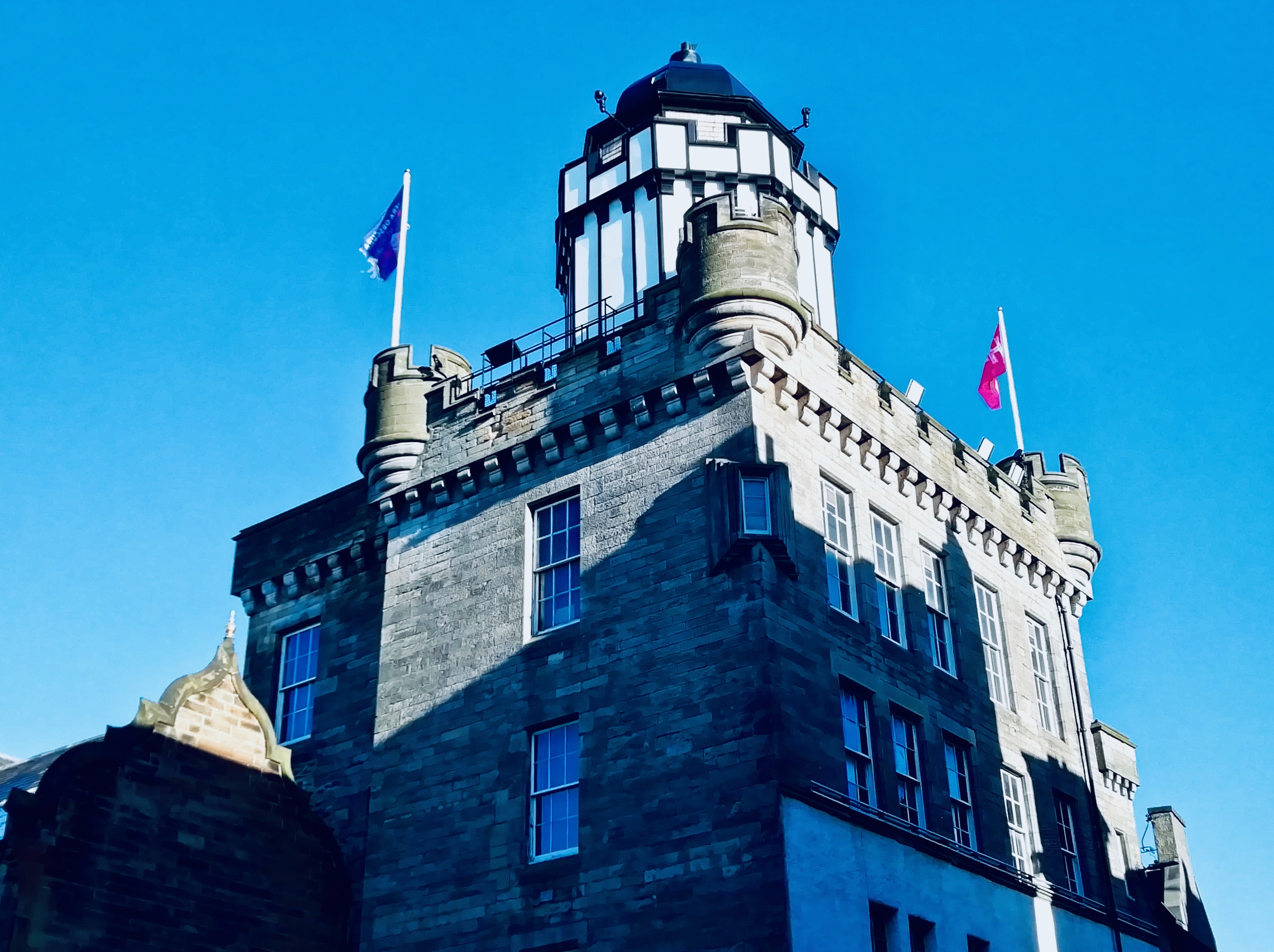
Outlook Tower, Castlehill, Royal Mile, Edinburgh

Donald Seton Cammell was born 17 January 1934 in the Outlook Tower on Castlehill, on the approach to Edinburgh Castle in Scotland. He was the elder son of the poet and writer Charles Richard Cammell (who wrote a book on occultist Aleister Crowley) and Iona Macdonald. His middle name Seton came from his godfather, the Scottish naturalist Seton Gordon. He was educated at Shrewsbury House School and Westminster School.

Brought up in a bohemian atmosphere, Cammell was raised in an environment he described as "filled with magicians, metaphysicians, spiritualists and demons" including Aleister Crowley. Charles Richard Cammell had known Crowley personally and was an admirer of the magus, particularly of his poetry. In Charles Cammell's 1962 biography Aleister Crowley: The Man: The Mage: The Poet, he wrote that Crowley "was a poet of lyric genius."

Owing to his father's relationship with the diabolist, Donald Cammell met Crowley. He claimed he sat on Crowley's lap. As an actor, Cammell would play Osiris in Lucifer Rising, a film made by Kenneth Anger, a Crowley disciple who based the film on Crowley's poem "Hymn to Lucifer".

== Painting career ==
Cammell was a precociously gifted painter, winning a scholarship to the Royal Academy of Arts at the age of 16. He subsequently studied in Florence with Annigoni and made his living as a society portrait painter. In 1953, one of his portraits was hailed as "society portrait of the year".

After the end of a short-lived early marriage, he moved to New York to live with model Deborah Dixon and concentrate on painting nudes.

== Filmmaking ==
In 1961, Cammell moved to Paris and began writing screenplays; first, a thriller called The Touchables, then a collaboration with Harry Joe Brown Jr. called Duffy. This caper movie was directed by Robert Parrish in 1968 (and featured James Fox), an artistic failure that frustrated Cammell to the point that he decided to direct. Through his friendship with Anita Pallenberg, he came into the orbit of the Rolling Stones and moved to London.

After Performance, he wrote a script called Ishtar that was to feature William Burroughs as a judge kidnapped while on holiday in Morocco. Like most of the scripts he worked on, it remained unproduced. His unwillingness to compromise his ideas alienated him from the Hollywood establishment that perceived him as an eccentric troublemaker. Several of Cammell's major frustrations involved Marlon Brando. In 1978, Brando invited Cammell to collaborate on a script called Fan Tan which Brando soon lost interest in; then he asked Cammell to adapt the script as a novel and again scuttled the project halfway through by losing interest. In 1987, Brando employed Cammell to direct a script he had written called Jericho. After eighteen months of work, while on pre-production in Mexico, Brando again decided he did not want to go through with the project.

The next project Cammell managed to get made was a short called The Argument that was shot on location in the Utah desert by Vilmos Zsigmond on the sly in 1971. Cammell had obtained the camera on the grounds that Zsigmond was shooting tests for another film. This confrontation between a frustrated film director and a goddess (played by Myriam Gibril, Cammell's lover and Isis to his Osiris in Kenneth Anger's Lucifer Rising) covers many of Cammell's favourite themes, but Cammell never completed the film. It was rediscovered and put together by his editor, Frank Mazzola, in 1999.

Cammell's next feature was Demon Seed (1977). Although not a personal project, this science fiction thriller (based on a book by Dean R. Koontz) featured many of Cammell's obsessions. A super-computer takes over a scientist's house with his wife (Julie Christie) inside and proceeds to terrorise and ultimately impregnate her. A two-hander between Christie and the computer, Demon Seed's mind games and closed environment are reminiscent of Performance, while the idea of the machine giving a child to the heroine and thus providing itself with a human incarnation is another example of Cammell's fascination with transformative sexuality. Cammell had to wait until 1987 to complete another project, White of the Eye. This study of a serial killer features a return of his cross-cutting techniques (absent from Demon Seed).

His final film Wild Side (1995) was a troubled production. Financed by Nu Image, a production company that made exploitation pictures, Cammell was hired to shoot an art film as a prestige project, to boost Nu Image's stature in the movie industry. As Cammell shot and edited his film, the producers became anxious over his artistic avant-garde techniques. Nu Image executives reportedly demanded that he include more nudity in the film. Ultimately, they took over the film, abandoning Cammell's cut and re-cutting the film to eliminate his innovative cross-cutting (a technique that goes back to Performance) to create a more linear narrative, and inserting more nudity. The Nu Image cut made the narrative incoherent and was disowned by Cammell. Cammell's brother said after his brother's suicide that the production company's interference made him consider retaliating with violence. David Cammell said, "...at one point he [Donald] was going to go and shoot [producer] Eli Cohen, but I managed to persuade him that it was a negative thing to shoot your producer and then shoot yourself."

== Personal life ==
Cammell was married twice, first to the Greek actress Maria Antippas (1928–2021, m. 1954–?), by whom he had a son Amadis (b. 1959), and then to the American writer China Kong (m. 1978). He is survived by his son and his second wife.

=== Death ===
On the night of 24 April 1996, Cammell shot himself in the head in his Hollywood Hills home. He took 45 minutes to die, during which time he talked about his movie Performance (which features Mick Jagger's character being shot in the head in an assisted suicide) with his wife, China Kong, asking her to provide him with a mirror so he could witness his own death, mirroring a scene from his film White of the Eye.

Friends told the press he was suffering from severe chronic depression. Cammell's depression reportedly was exacerbated by the studio's recutting of his recent movie Wild Side without his permission.

In an article for Senses of Cinema, Maximilian Le Cain wrote "[Cammell] was alive and conscious for up to 45 minutes afterwards and, reportedly, was in a happy, almost euphoric state. The fact that he didn’t die instantly was not accidental; in fact he allegedly requested that his wife and writing collaborator China Cammell hold up a mirror so he could watch himself die and asked her ‘Do you see the picture of Borges?’"

== Documentary ==
- Donald Cammell: The Ultimate Performance (1999, directed by Kevin Macdonald and Chris Rodley)

== Filmography ==
=== Feature films ===
Year	Title	Director	Writer	Notes
1970	Performance	Yes	Yes	Co-directed with Nicolas Roeg
1977	Demon Seed	Yes	No	
1987	White of the Eye	Yes	Yes	Co-writer with China Kong
1995	Wild Side	Yes	Yes	Co-writer with China Kong

==== Writer only ====
Year	Title	Director	Notes
1968	Duffy	Robert Parrish	with Harry Joe Brown Jr. and Pierre de la Salle
1979	Tilt	Rudy Durand	with Durand
1998	RPM	Ian Sharp	with Roger Avary and JP Gardner; Posthumous release

=== Short films ===
Year	Title	Director	Writer	Notes
1999	The Argument	Yes	Yes	Filmed in 1971; Posthumous release

=== Music videos ===
Year	Title	Artist
1984	Pride (In the Name of Love)	U2
1985	Lie for a Lie	Nick Mason, Rick Fenn
1985	All You Zombies	The Hooters
1993	Love Is Blindness	U2

=== Acting roles ===
Year	Title	Role	Director
1967	La Collectionneuse	Man in Saint-Tropez	Éric Rohmer
1972	Lucifer Rising	Osiris	Kenneth Anger
