= The Futurist Cinema =

Former cinema in Liverpool, England

The Futurist
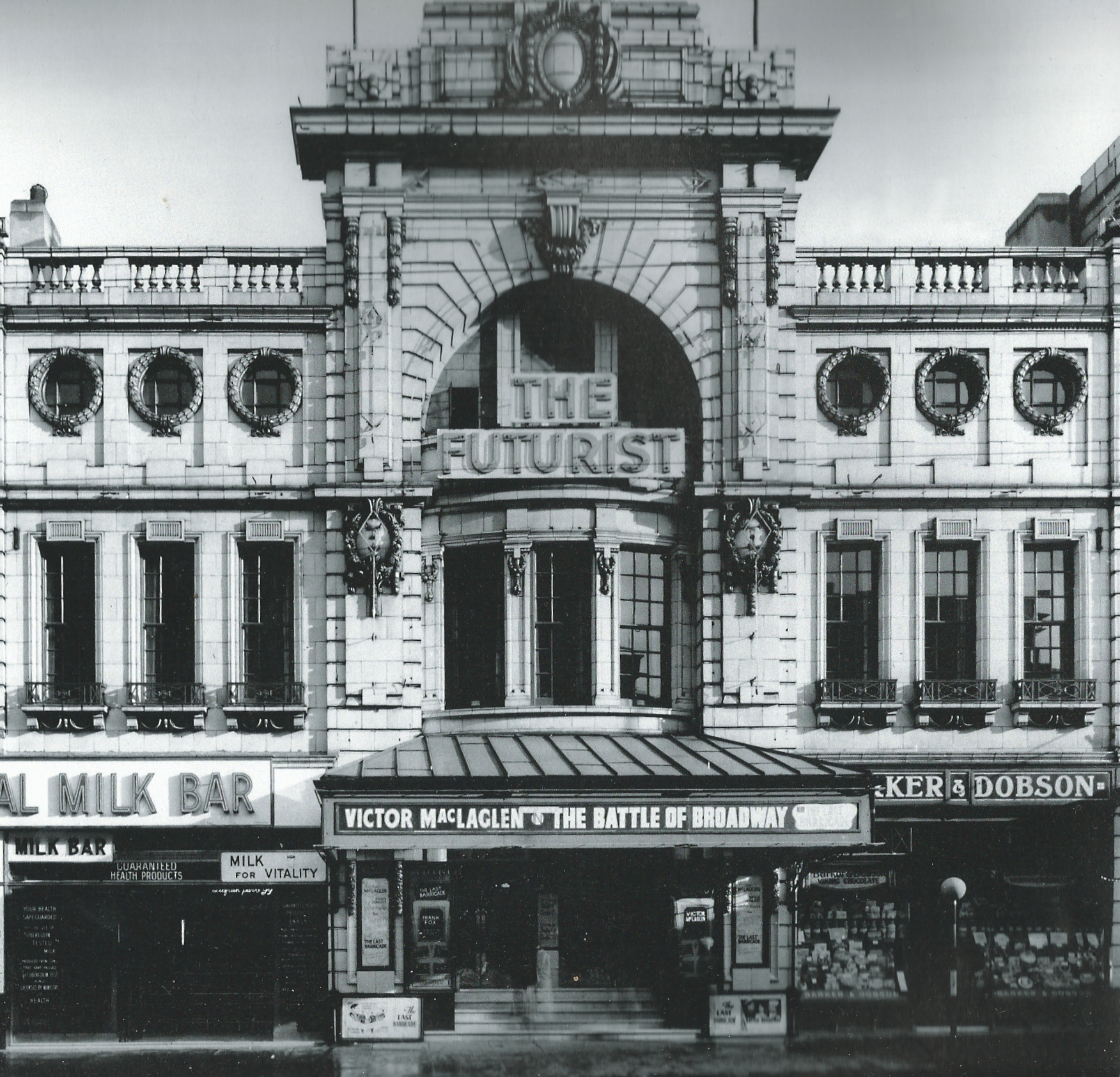
- The Futurist in 1938
- Interactive map of The Futurist
- Former names: Lime Street Picture House, City Picture House
- Coordinates: 53.4061°N 2.9788°W
- Capacity: 1,029 (1912–1960); 870 (1960 onwards)

Construction
- Opened: 16 September 1912
- Closed: 1982
- Demolished: August 2016

The Futurist Cinema was a cinema located in Lime Street, Liverpool. Opened as Lime Street Picture House in 1912, the cinema operated until closing in 1982. Unable to find a new owner it was left to decline. It was demolished in 2016 after a court battle over the controversial plans for redevelopment of the area.

== History ==
=== Early years ===
Opened on 16 September 1912, the 'Lime Street Picture House' was a very upmarket city centre cinema, with a Georgian styled facade & a French Renaissance interior. The grand entrance foyer had a black & white square tiled floor and the walls were of Sicilian marble. It housed a luxurious cafe on the 1st floor and the auditorium was designed to have the effect of a live theatre with an abundance of architectural features, embellished by plaster mouldings. It provided seating for 1,029 patrons. The cinema also boasted a full orchestra to accompany the silent films.

On 14 August 1916, the cinema changed its name to 'City Picture House' due to another cinema opening in Clayton Square which was called 'Liverpool Picture House'. And in October 1920 a new company was formed 'Futurist (Liverpool) LTD' to purchase the cinema and the two shops for £167,000. The building was a leasehold from Liverpool Corporation and from this time the Futurist (and the Scala, adjacent, demolished in 2017) were both controlled by Levy Cinema Circuit, who also had cinemas in Birmingham.

The era of silent films ended in 1929 at the futurist and new 'Western Electric Talking Equipment' was installed. By the 1930s cinemas were popping up everywhere, the Forum in 1931 & the Paramount on London Road in 1934. This obviously affected the Futurist's business and resulted in the cinema showing second runs of leading films.

=== Showing and making the news in wartime Liverpool ===
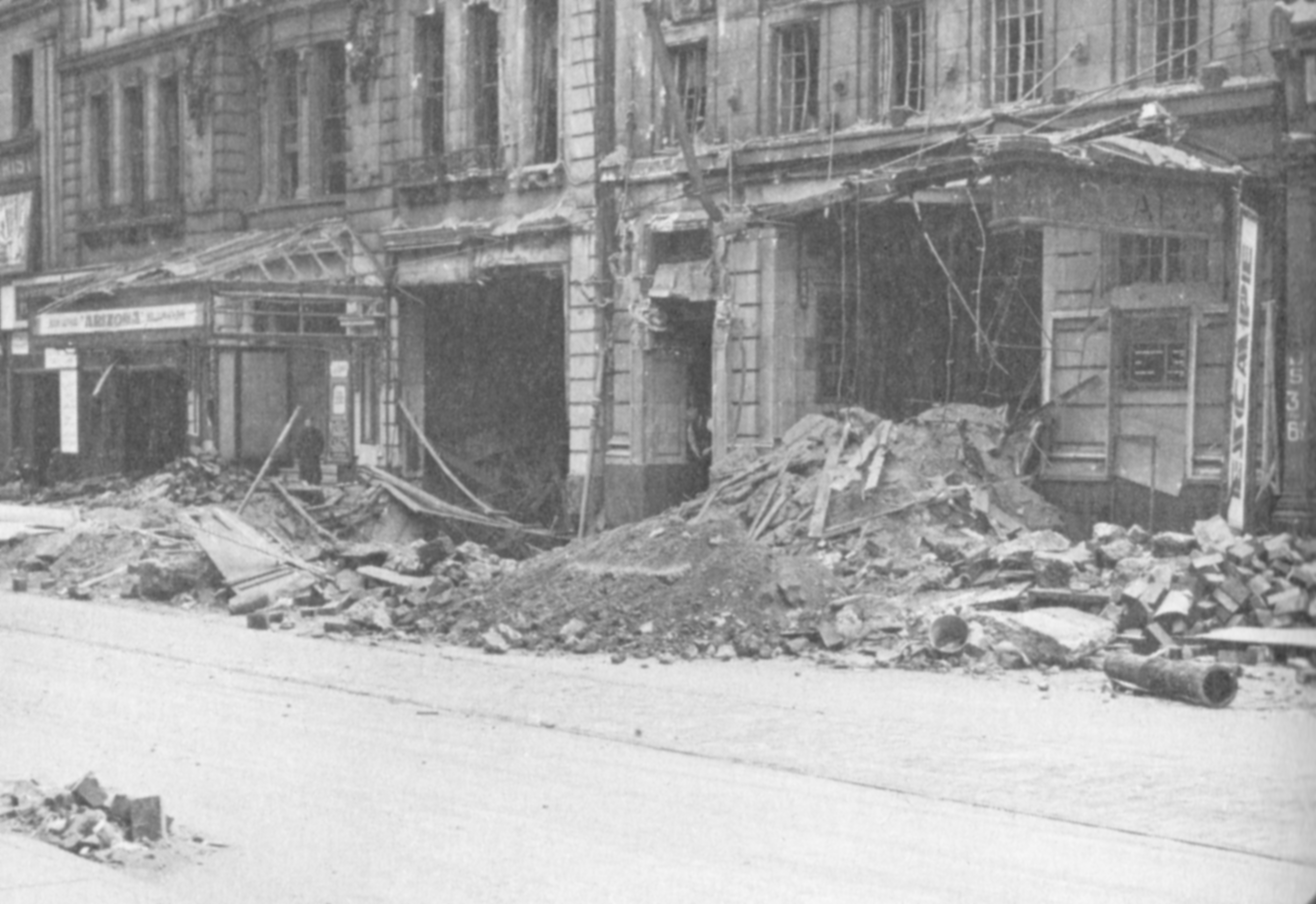
Damage done to two of Lime Street's cinemas on the night of 3/4 May 1941

The outbreak of war saw an initial closure of cinemas due to fears that large groups of people congregated in one place was inviting trouble during an air raid. This ban lasted less than a week though, as it was soon recognised that cinema had a valuable role to play in keeping civilian morale high, and keeping people up to date with the latest news on the war effort. Television was virtually unknown in this country, so people relied on newsreels shown in cinemas for a visual confirmation of what they read in their newspaper, or heard on the radio.

The 25 April 1941 saw the visit of the prime minister, Winston Churchill to the city. He was driven around in an open topped car and cheered by the local people wherever he went. At one stage he passed along Lime Street, as can be seen in newspaper articles that appeared the next day.

May 1941 saw both the Futurist & the adjacent Scala Cinema suffering bomb damage. The exact date in unclear, but a newspaper cutting from the period suggests a date no later than the 5th, and the area is known to have been very badly damaged on the 3rd. It was rebuilt and reopened in minimal time & was showing films by June that year. This saw the original pediment replaced with a less ornate classical style version.

=== The end of an era ===
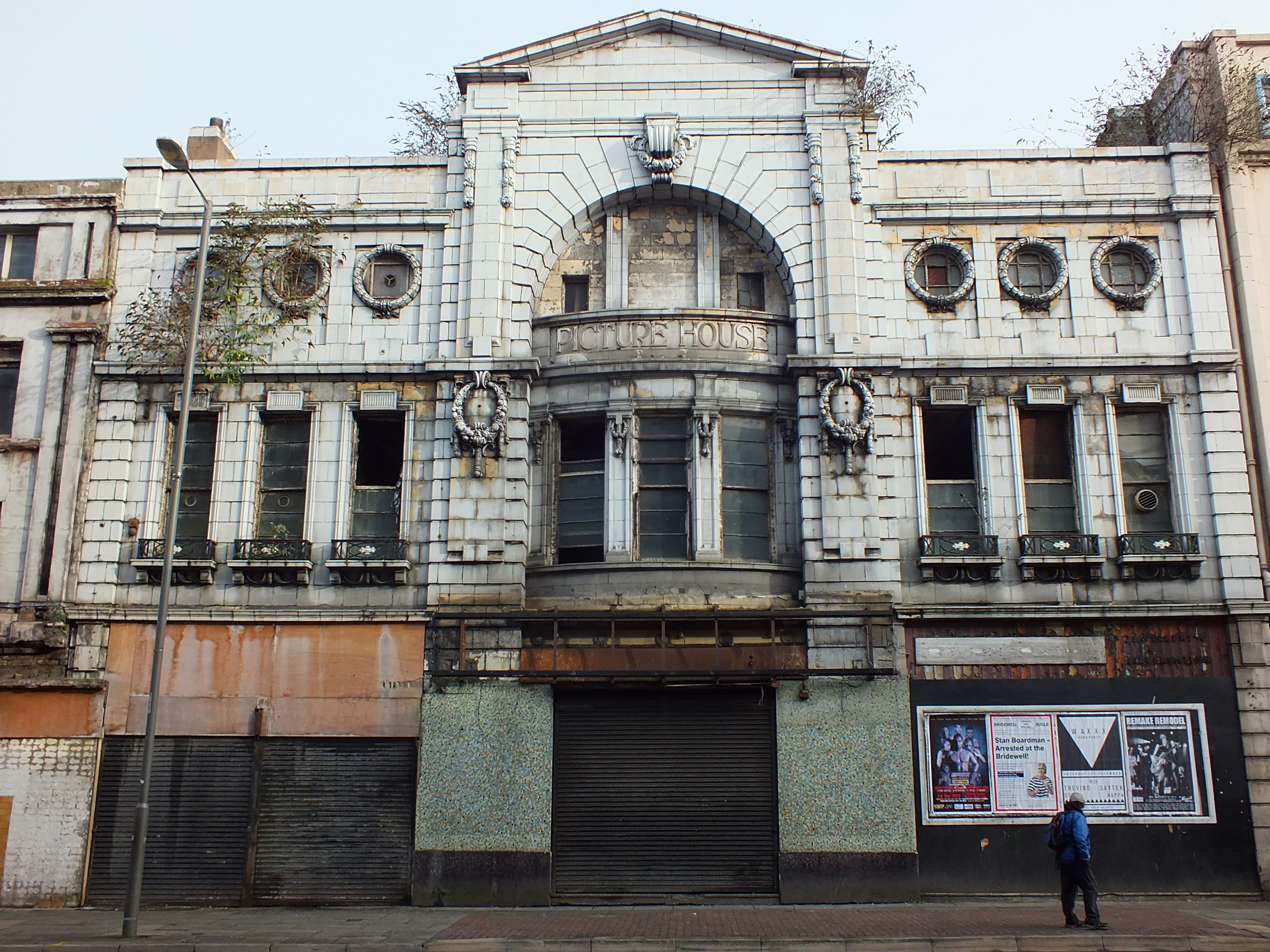
A view of the facade taken in December 2012

In 1954 Twentieth Century Fox leased the Futurist & showed cinema scope films for the first time in Liverpool showing wide screen films, This continued until 1960 when they relinquished control and ABC took it over for £135,000; they spent a further £50,000 on upgrades, reducing the seating capacity to 870. ABC reopened the Futurist in July 1960 and kept control of it until its closure in 1982. ABC owned 12 cinemas in Liverpool including the Scala & the Forum. Both the Scala & the Futurist were closed to make way for the Forum's new multi screen cinema.

The closures were blamed on the shortage of good films, video market, the recession and unemployment. The building subsequently fell into a state of dilapidation. A number of plans for the Futurist were proposed including:

- Lifestyle LTD in Jan 1984, 18 months after its closure, plans were put forward to turn the Futurist into a 1920s style nightclub
- The Skelhorne Triangle

=== 21st century ===
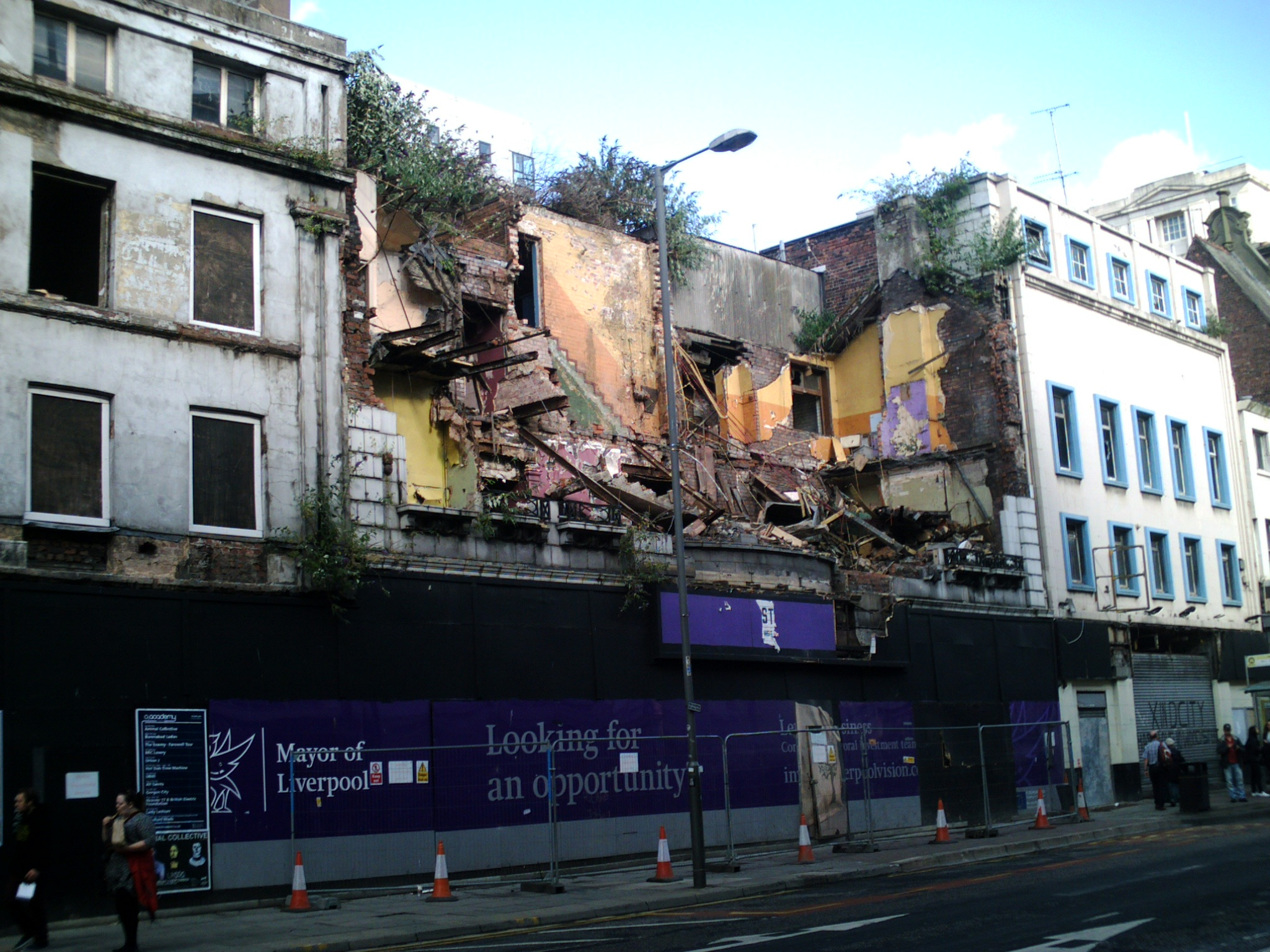
The Futurist after removal of the Facade in August 2016.

The facade of The Futurist was used as a piece of art for the 2010 Liverpool Biennial.

As part of plans to renovate Lime Street, Liverpool Council determined that the building was too badly derelict to save, with parts of the building not even safe enough for structural engineers investigating the building to enter. A report published in March 2015 by Sutcliffe found that the building's structure was largely corroded and rotting due to water damage from the roof, though concluded that the facade may be salvageable. Renovations for Lime Street, including demolition of the Futurist, were approved in August 2015. This followed a number of campaigns that took place attempting to save the building's facade in the preceding years, firstly by local Facebook campaigners whose petition generated 4,015 signatories and later by the Merseyside Civic Society and SAVE . After an independent engineer stated that there was a possibility the facade could be saved, campaigners were granted the right to appeal in May 2016.

In April 2016 emergency work had to be carried out to make the building safe, with what safety inspectors described as "internal collapse, leaning walls and a high risk that cladding tiles may fall off". Works to be carried out included the demolition of the facade in May. Structural reports regarding the facade were highly controversial with original reports by Sutcliffe being discredited by heritage specialists Morton Partnerships who found that the construction of the facade were made of hollowed blocks rather than tiles as previously assumed. They found no significant threat of cladding 'tiles' falling off but recommended the removal and retention of the post WWII pediment which was not secured appropriately. Liverpool Council attempted to demolish the facade while the court appeal was ongoing but campaigners were able to obtain a block on this in time. The pediment was removed in line with what was suggested by Morton Partnership. In August the same year, a legal challenge to save the building's facade was rejected, with the council declaring it beyond repair. By September the building had been completely demolished.

=== Replacement ===
The building and its neighbouring properties have now been replaced with a £35 million retail, hotel and student accommodation complex. Initial designs for the complex were criticised by local politicians, including Liverpool's Mayor Joe Anderson who described the proposals as "not very impressive" and by then-councillor Richard Kemp as "abysmal". The development won the Carbuncle Cup for Britain's ugliest new building in 2024.
