= Nick Mason =

English drummer (born 1944)

Nick Mason CBE
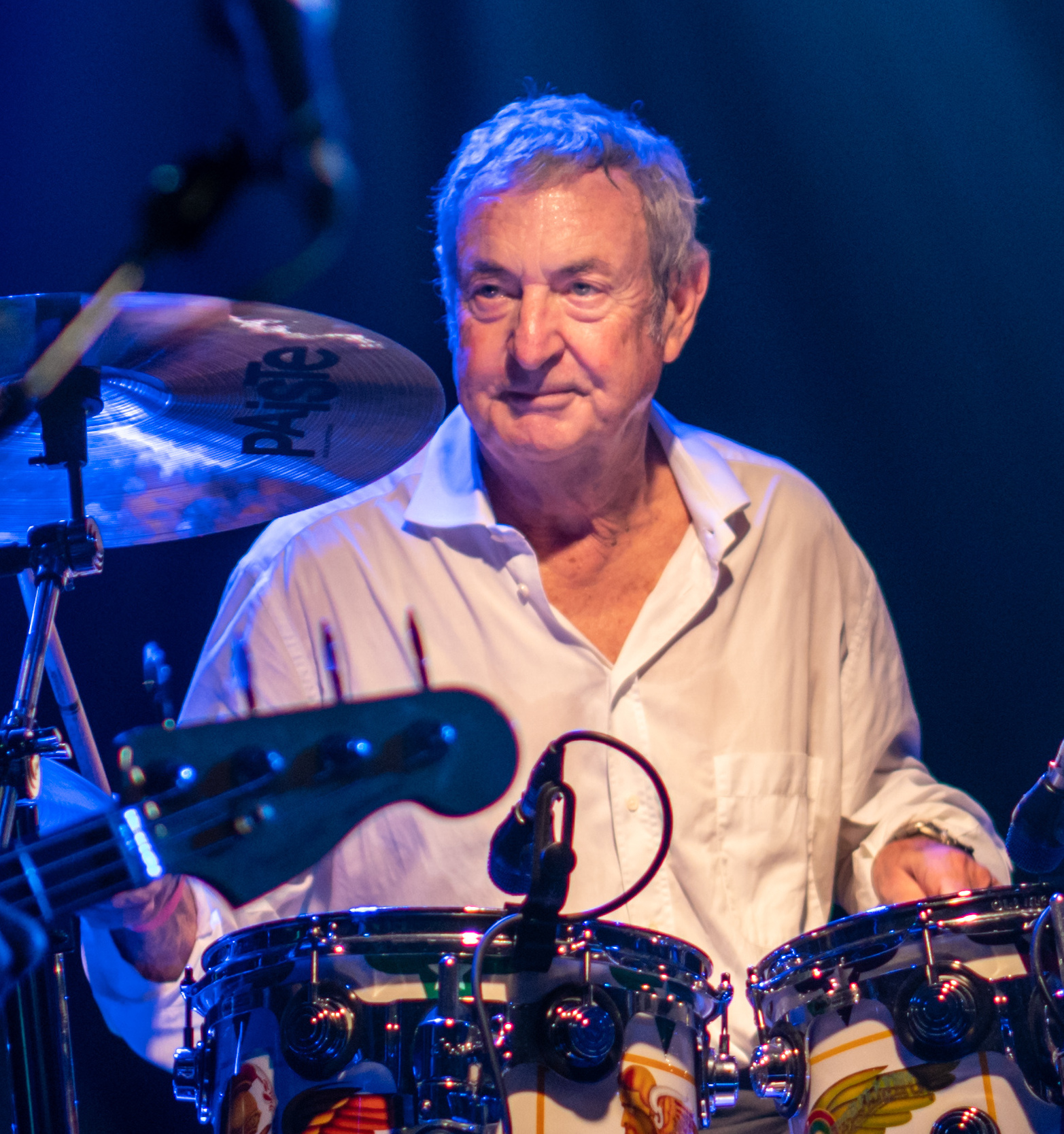
- Mason performing in 2018

Background information
- Born: Nicholas Berkeley Mason; 27 January 1944 (age 82); Birmingham, Warwickshire, England
- Origin: Hampstead, London, England
- Genres: Progressive rock; psychedelic rock
- Occupations: Musician; composer; record producer; author; auto racer
- Instruments: Drums; percussion
- Years active: Early 1960s–present
- Member of: Pink Floyd; Nick Mason's Saucerful of Secrets

Nicholas Berkeley Mason (born 27 January 1944) is an English drummer and a founder member of the rock band Pink Floyd. He has been the only constant member since the band's formation in 1965, and the only member to appear on every Pink Floyd album. He co-wrote Pink Floyd compositions including "Echoes", "Time", "Careful with That Axe, Eugene" and "One of These Days".

In 1996, Mason was inducted into the Rock and Roll Hall of Fame as a member of Pink Floyd. In 2018, he formed a new band, Nick Mason's Saucerful of Secrets, to perform music from Pink Floyd's early years. Mason collects classic cars and competes in motorsport races, and has produced books and documentaries on the subject.

== Early life ==
Nicholas Berkeley Mason was born on 27 January 1944 in Birmingham to Ailsa Sarah (née Kershaw) and Bill Mason, a documentary filmmaker; one of his paternal great-grandfathers was Rowland Hill Berkeley, who was Lord Mayor of Birmingham in 1904–1905.

Mason was brought up in Hampstead, London, and attended the Hall School, Hampstead, and Frensham Heights School, near Farnham, Surrey. While studying architecture at the Regent Street Polytechnic (now the University of Westminster), he formed a band, Sigma 6, an early incarnation of Pink Floyd, with Roger Waters, Bob Klose and Richard Wright in the early 1960s. In September 1963, Waters and Mason moved into a flat near Crouch End in London, owned by Mike Leonard, a part-time tutor at the nearby Hornsey College of Art and the Regent Street Polytechnic. (Note: Leonard designed light machines, which used electric motors to spin perforated discs, casting patterns of lights on the walls. These were demonstrated on an early edition of Tomorrow's World. For a brief time Leonard played keyboard with them, using the front room of his flat for rehearsals.) Mason moved out after the 1964 academic year. (Note: Wright also briefly lived at Leonard's.)

== Pink Floyd ==
Pink Floyd released their debut album, The Piper at the Gates of Dawn, in 1967. Mason has played on every Pink Floyd album since. The only Pink Floyd compositions credited solely to Mason are "The Grand Vizier's Garden Party" (from Ummagumma) and "Speak to Me" (from The Dark Side of the Moon). The track "Nick's Boogie" was named after him.

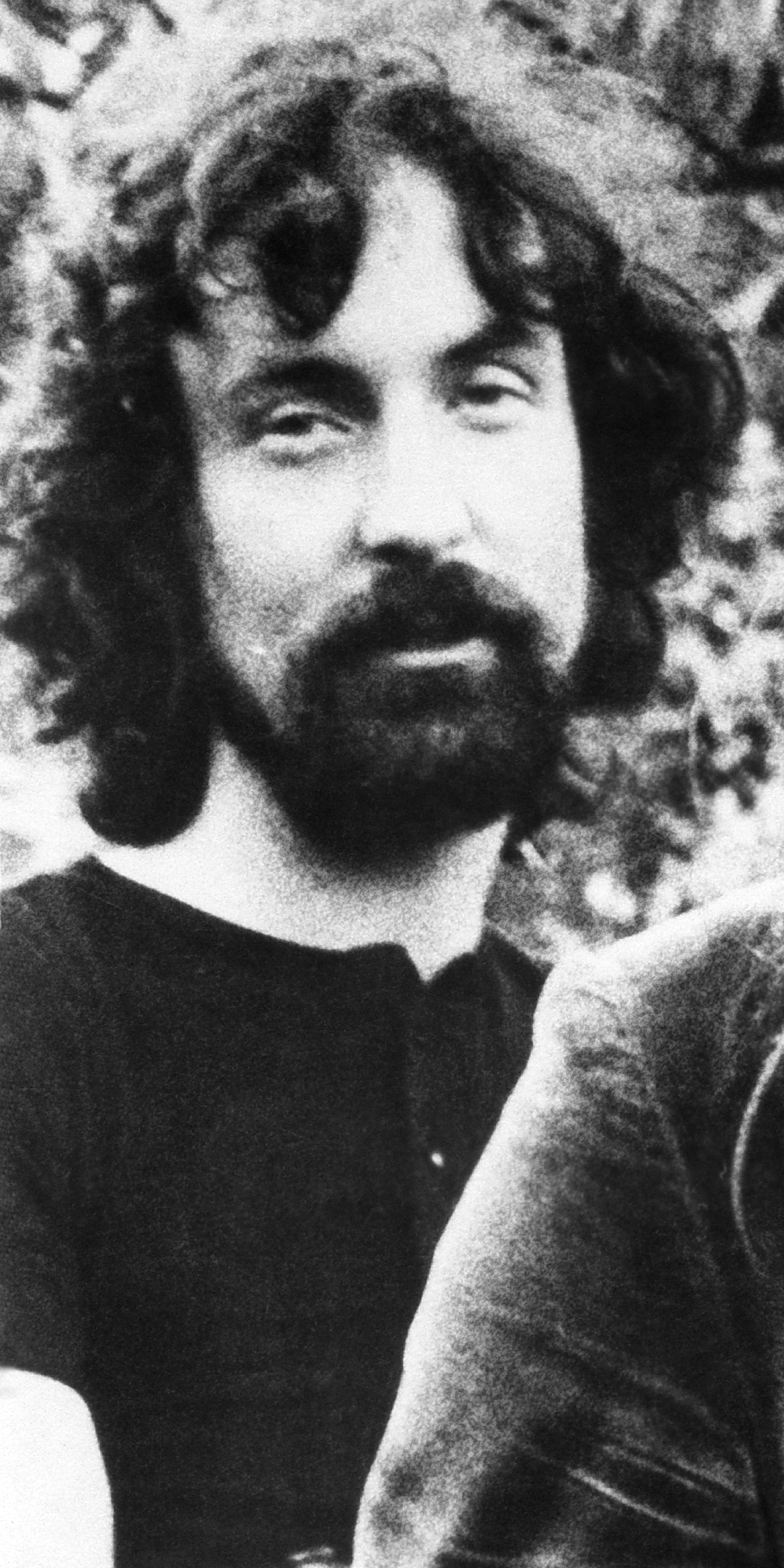
Mason in 1973

The only occasions on which Mason's voice has been included on Pink Floyd's albums are "Corporal Clegg"; a distorted spoken word line on "Atom Heart Mother"; the single spoken line in "One of These Days"; and spoken parts of "Signs of Life" and "Learning to Fly" (the latter taken from an actual recording of Mason's first solo flight) from A Momentary Lapse of Reason. He sang lead vocals on two unreleased but heavily bootlegged tracks, "Scream Thy Last Scream" (1967), penned by original group leader Syd Barrett, and "The Merry Xmas Song" (1975–76). In live performances of the song "Sheep", Mason delivered the spoken section.

Despite legal conflicts over ownership of the name "Pink Floyd", which began when Waters left the group in 1985 and lasted roughly seven years, Waters and Mason reportedly remained on good terms. Mason joined Waters on the last two nights of his 2002 world tour to play drums on the Pink Floyd song "Set the Controls for the Heart of the Sun", and he also played drums on some concerts of Waters' European tour in 2006, and during performances in Los Angeles and New York City in the United States.

In July 2005, Mason, Gilmour, Wright, and Waters played together on stage for the first time in 24 years at the Live 8 concert in London. Mason joined Gilmour and Wright again for the encore during Gilmour's show at the Royal Albert Hall, London, on 31 May 2006. He also stated in 2006 that Pink Floyd had not officially disbanded, but with the death of Wright in 2008, the band effectively came to an end, as confirmed by Gilmour. While Gilmour and Waters continued to quarrel, Mason remained close to both.

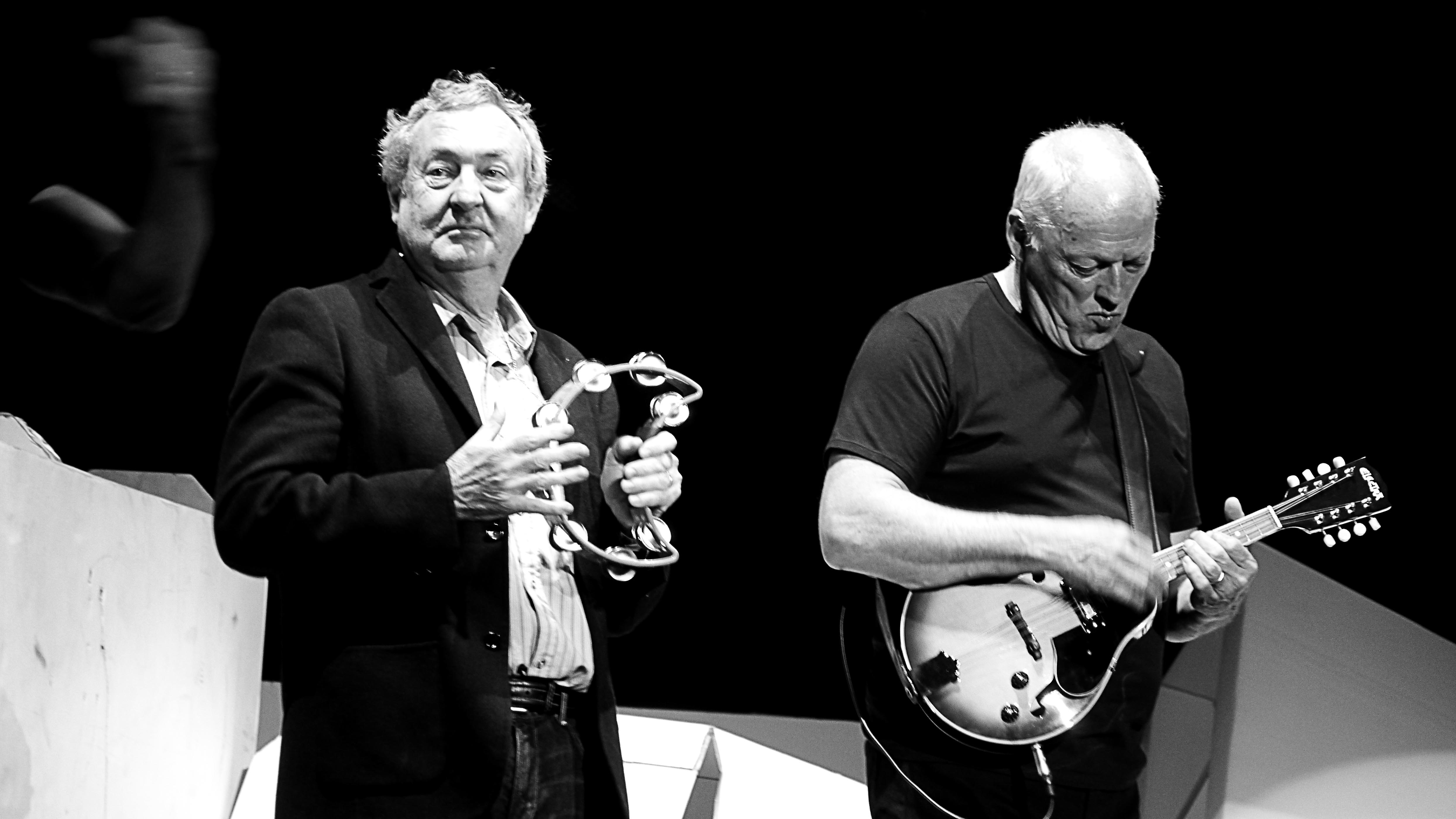
Mason and guitarist David Gilmour at Roger Waters' The Wall Tour, May 2011

On 12 May 2007, Mason joined Waters on stage at Earls Court to play The Dark Side of the Moon. On 12 May 2011, Mason was featured (along with Gilmour) on the encore "Outside the Wall" at a concert by Waters, who was performing The Wall in its entirety (Gilmour also performed on "Comfortably Numb" that night). Mason worked with musicians including Steve Hillage (as drummer and producer), Robert Wyatt (with whom he appeared on Top of the Pops), the Damned and Gong. He also drummed for Michael Mantler.

Mason's memoir, Inside Out: A Personal History of Pink Floyd, was published in the UK in October 2004. It is also available, abridged, as a 3-CD audio book, read by Mason. An updated edition was published in paperback in 2011.

Mason performed in the closing ceremony of the 2012 Olympic Games on 12 August 2012. He produced and played on the charity single "Save the Children (Look Into Your Heart)", which also featured Beverley Knight, Mick Jagger and Ronnie Wood and which was released in May 2015 in aid of Save the Children's Nepal Earthquake Appeal. On 17 October 2012, Mason was presented with a BASCA Gold Badge Award in recognition of his contributions to music. Mason said in 2018 that, while he remained close to Gilmour and Waters, the two remained "at loggerheads".

=== Nick Mason's Saucerful of Secrets ===
In 2018, Mason formed a new band, Nick Mason's Saucerful of Secrets, to perform Pink Floyd's early psychedelic material. Along with Mason, the band comprises guitarist Lee Harris, formerly of the Blockheads, bassist and Pink Floyd collaborator Guy Pratt, vocalist and guitarist Gary Kemp of Spandau Ballet, and the Orb keyboardist Dom Beken. As many fans had discovered Pink Floyd with The Dark Side of the Moon, Mason wanted to bring their earlier material to a wider audience. The band toured Europe and North America in 2018 and 2019, with a third tour postponed to 2021 due to the COVID-19 pandemic. In September 2020, they released a live album and film, Live at the Roundhouse.

== Drumming style ==
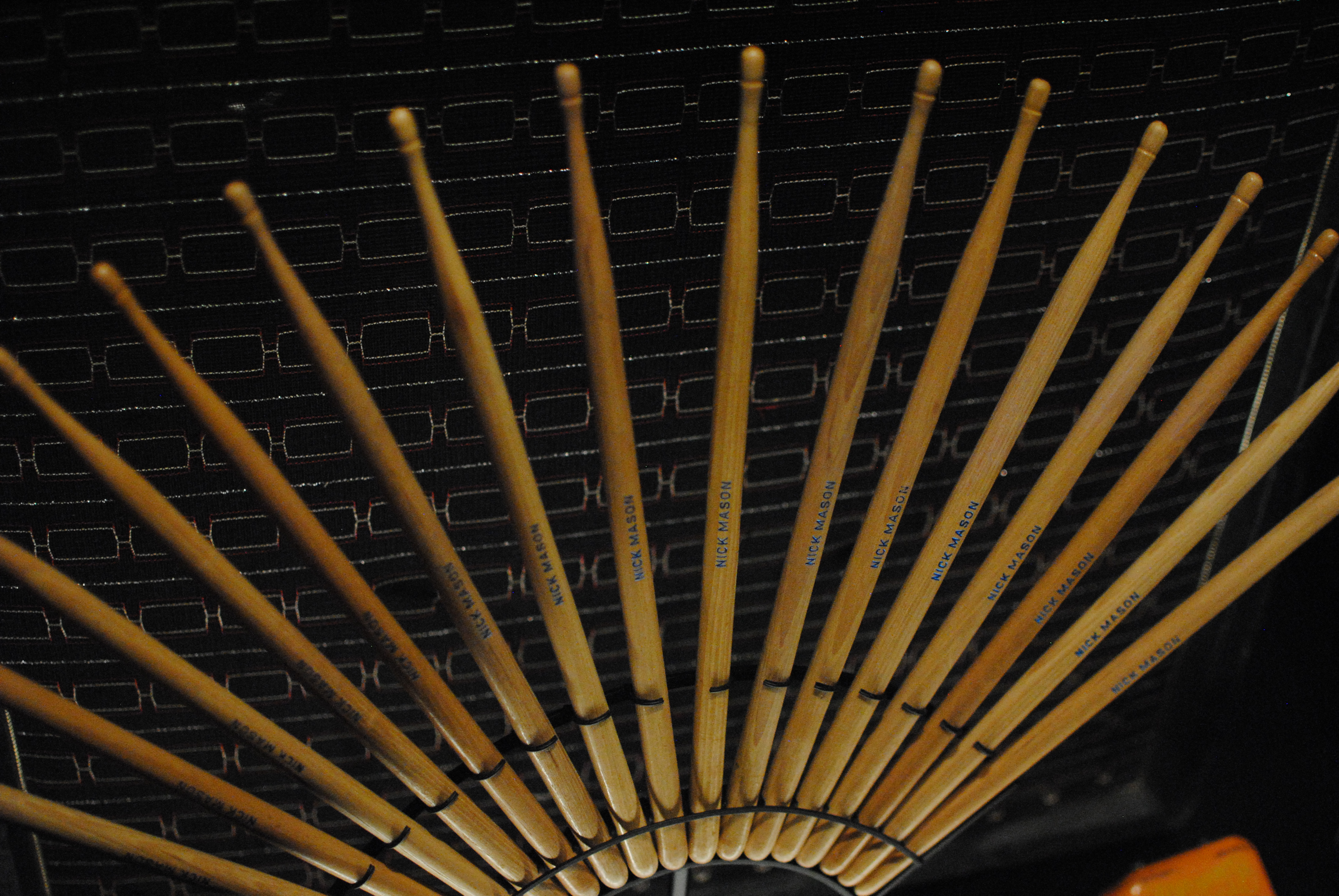
A selection of Mason's customised drumsticks, from various makers, displayed at the Pink Floyd: Their Mortal Remains exhibition

Influenced by jazz and big band music, Mason embraced acoustic drums (both single- and double-headed), tuned percussion, electronic drums and Rototoms, melding all of these into a melodic whole. His snare drum sound shifted from harsh demarcation of beats 2 and 4 ("Careful with that Axe, Eugene") to a fatter and gentler timbre ("Echoes") — a change that reflected growing studio skills.

Mason soloed on a few Pink Floyd songs including "Nick's Boogie", "A Saucerful of Secrets", "The Grand Vizier's Garden Party", "Up The Khyber", "Skins", and "Time". Due to the dynamic live performances of Pink Floyd, Mason's style was more energetic and complex live, and can be heard on such albums as Ummagumma and Live at Pompeii.

Mason began using Premier drums but changed to Ludwig drums after seeing Ginger Baker use them. He also briefly used Fibes Drums. He currently uses Drum Workshop (DW) drums, pedals and hardware. His kit is a DW double bass kit with the Dark Side of the Moon logo on the drums. He has used Paiste cymbals during his entire career with Pink Floyd and currently uses a mixture of Paiste Traditional, Signature and 2002 cymbals. He endorses Remo drumheads, Latin Percussion and Pro-Mark sticks.

== Motor racing career ==
Nick Mason
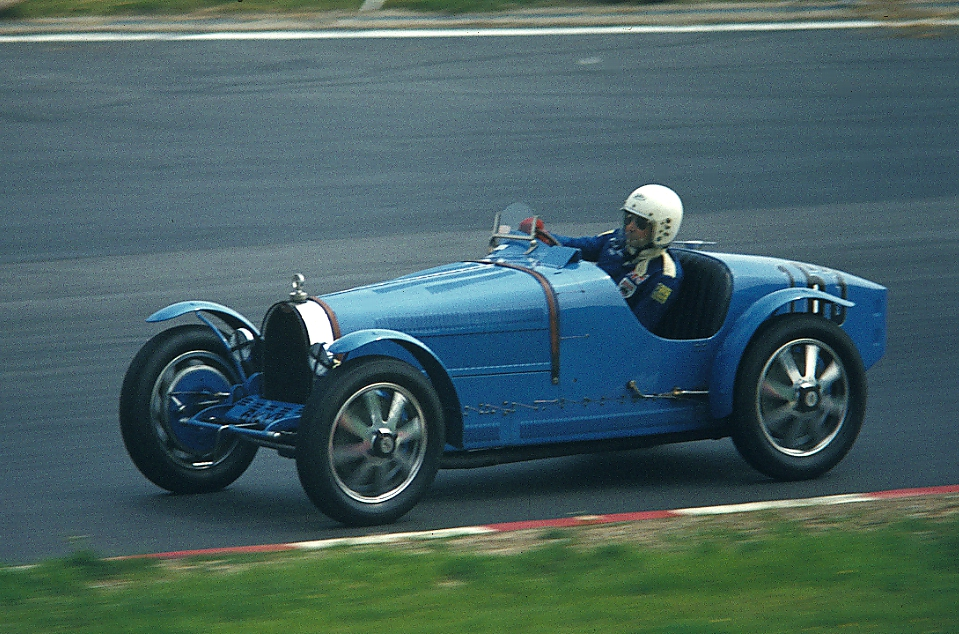
- Mason in 1981
- Nationality: (United Kingdom) British

24 Hours of Le Mans career
- Years: 1979–80, 1982–84
- Teams: Dorset Racing Associates; EMKA Productions; Dome Racing; GTi Engineering
- Best finish: 18th (1979)
- Class wins: 0

As Pink Floyd's recording and touring schedule grew more sporadic, Mason had more time to pursue his favourite hobby, motor racing. This interest was documented in the 1986 short film Life Could Be a Dream. He owns (through his company Ten Tenths) and races several classic cars, and has competed at the 24 Hours of Le Mans. His racing cars include:

- Alfa Romeo 8C
- Bentley 4½ Litre (his father's racing car)
- BRM P30 (which he previously raced)
- Bugatti Type 35
- Jaguar D-Type;
- Ferrari 250 LM
- Ferrari BB LM
- Maserati Tipo 61
- McLaren F1 GTR

In 1998, Mason published a book, Into the Red, in which he documents his experience with his cars, along with some histories. It was followed in 2010 by a second book, Passion for Speed: Twenty-four Classic Cars that Shaped a Century of Motor Sport.

Mason is associated with the Italian manufacturer Ferrari, and estimates he has owned 40 Ferrari cars. His first purchase in the early 1970s was a Ferrari 275 GTB/4. His most notable purchase was in 1977 from his proceeds from the sale of the Pink Floyd album Dark Side Of The Moon, when he paid £37,000 (equivalent to £217,386 in 2025) for one of only 36 Ferrari 250 GTOs. He still owns the car, valued now in excess of £30 million. Mason and Gilmour drove the first two Ferrari F40s back to the UK from Maranello.

Mason was invited by Ferrari to purchase one of the 399 original Enzo cars. He appeared in an episode of the BBC motoring programme Top Gear in which he allowed Jeremy Clarkson to borrow it for a review, on the condition Clarkson promote the release of the book Inside Out: A Personal History of Pink Floyd. Skirting BBC advertising rules prohibiting product endorsements, Clarkson referenced Pink Floyd songs and album titles in the review of the Enzo and the Stig drove around the Top Gear test track with "Another Brick in the Wall" playing, despite the fact that the Enzo does not come equipped with a stereo. Mason later sold the Enzo, and replaced it with a Blu Scozia-coloured LaFerrari.

Mason appeared on series 2, episode 8 of The Grand Tour. He won against the Police drummer Stewart Copeland for the title of "fastest rock drummer from a band that begins with a P" (driving not drumming) in the Celebrity Face Off segment.

=== 24 Hours of Le Mans results ===
| Year | Team | Co-Drivers | Car | Class | Laps | Pos. | Class Pos. |
|---|---|---|---|---|---|---|---|
| 1979 | (United Kingdom) Dorset Racing Associates | (United Kingdom) Brian Joscelyne (United Kingdom) Tony Birchenhough (United Kingdom) Richard Jenvey | Lola T297 Ford-Cosworth | S 2.0 | 260 | 18th | 2nd |
| 1980 | (United Kingdom) Dorset Racing Associates | (United Kingdom) Peter Clarke (Republic of Ireland) Martin Birrane | Lola T297 Ford-Cosworth | S 2.0 | 263 | 22nd | 3rd |
| 1982 | (United Kingdom) EMKA Productions | (United Kingdom) Steve O'Rourke (United Kingdom) Richard Down | BMW M1 Gr.5 | IMSA GTX | 266 | DNF | DNF |
| 1983 | (Japan) Dome Racing | (United Kingdom) Chris Craft (Chile) Eliseo Salazar | Dome RC82 Ford-Cosworth | C | 75 | DNF | DNF |
| 1984 | (United Kingdom) GTi Engineering | (United Kingdom) Richard Lloyd (France) René Metge | Porsche 956 | C1 | 139 | DSQ | DSQ |

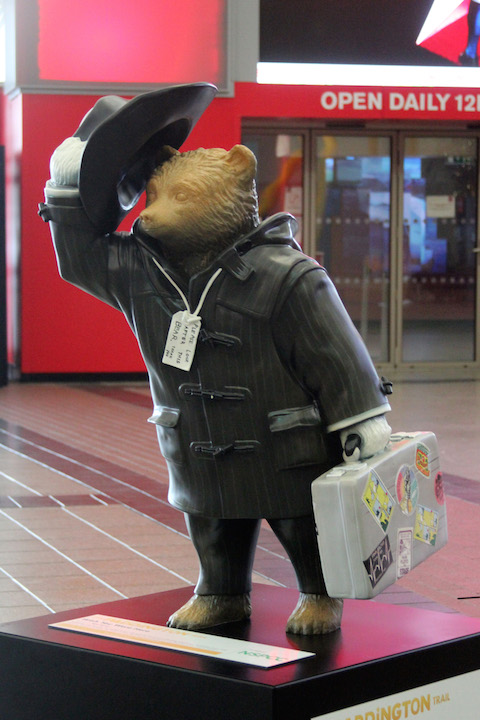
Mason's Paddington Bear statue outside the O2 Arena in London, auctioned to raise funds for the NSPCC

== Personal life ==
Mason's first marriage was to Lindy Rutter in 1969, with whom he has two daughters. During this time, she contributed uncredited tin whistle and flute parts to two Pink Floyd albums, More and Ummagumma. The couple divorced in 1988, and in 1990, Mason married Annette (Nettie) Lynton, an actress. They live in Hampstead, London with their two sons. Since 1995, the family has also owned Middlewick House, the Grade II listed former home of Andrew and Camilla Parker Bowles, just outside the Wiltshire town of Corsham.

Mason is an atheist. According to the Sunday Times Rich List 2015–2016, he had a wealth of £75 million. In addition to vintage car collecting, Mason is a qualified helicopter pilot and flies an Aerospatiale AS 350 Squirrel helicopter.

Mason is part of Football Ventures, a consortium that bought Bolton Wanderers Football Club out of administration in August 2019. He is a supporter of Arsenal F.C. In December 2021, Mason's portrait was painted by semi-finalists on an episode of Portrait Artist of the Year.

=== Views and advocacy ===
Like Roger Waters, Mason has played concerts to raise funds for the Countryside Alliance, a group which campaigned against the ban on fox hunting with the Hunting Act 2004. In 2007 they both performed at Highclere Castle in Hampshire in support of the group.

Mason is a board member and co-chairman of the Featured Artists' Coalition. As a spokesman for the organisation, he has voiced his support for musicians' rights and offered advice to younger artists in a rapidly changing music industry.

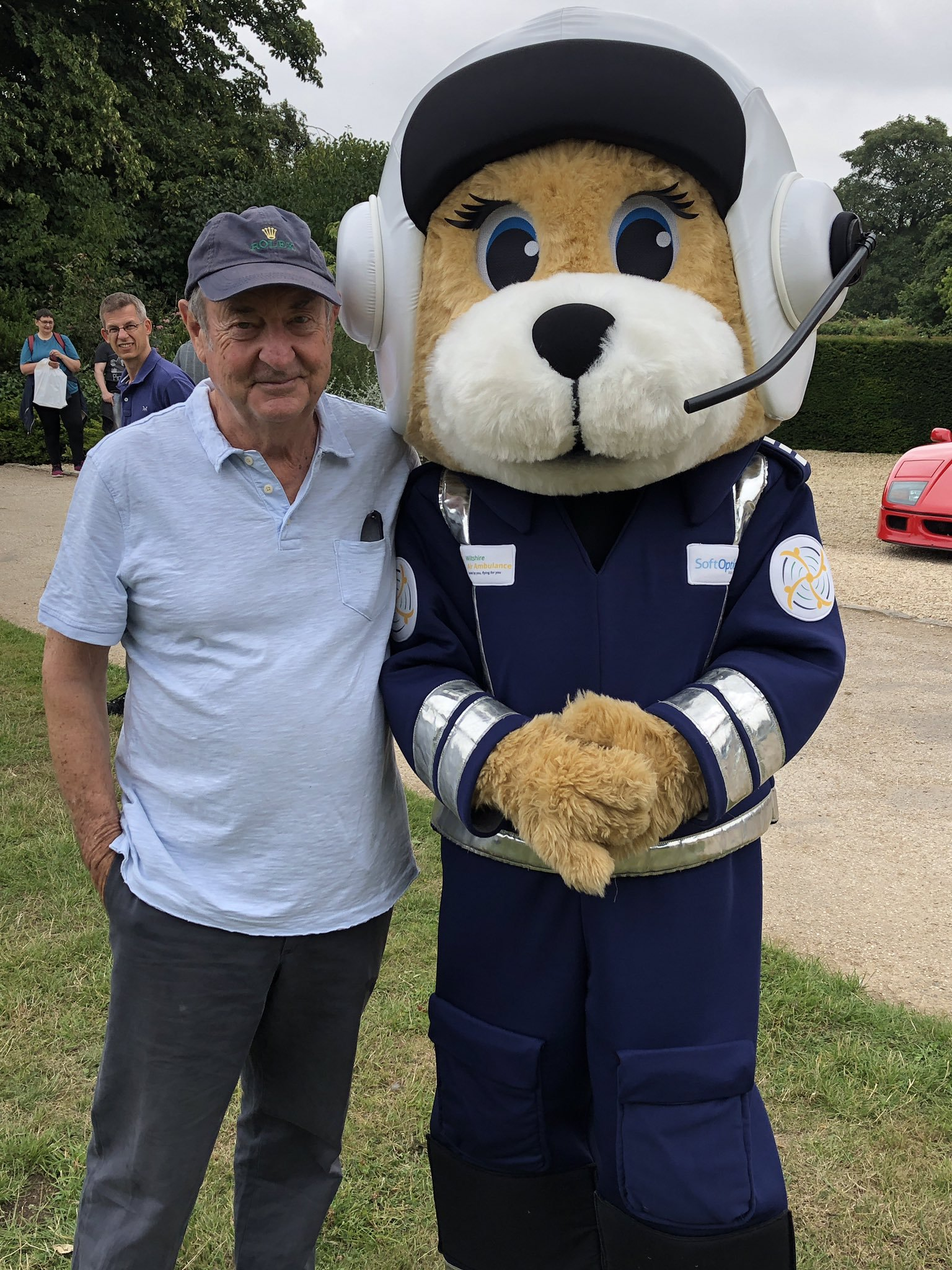
Mason with Wiltshire Air Ambulance mascot Marsha at Middlewick House Open Gardens in 2019

In 2014, Mason joined Waters in expressing support for the Boycott, Divestment and Sanctions campaign against Israel over the Israeli–Palestinian conflict and urged the Rolling Stones not to play in Israel. That November, Mason designed a "Wish You Were Here"–themed Paddington Bear statue, exhibited outside the O2 Arena in London (one of 50 placed around the city). The statues were auctioned to raise funds for the National Society for the Prevention of Cruelty to Children (NSPCC).

Mason and his wife have been supporters of Wiltshire and Bath Air Ambulance Charity for many years, including opening the gardens of their home, Middlewick House, to raise money for the charity.

== Honours and awards ==
On 26 November 2012, Mason received the honorary title of Doctor of Letters from the University of Westminster at the presentation ceremony of the School of Architecture and Built Environment (he had studied architecture at the university's predecessor, Regent Street Polytechnic, 1962–1967).

Mason was appointed a Commander of the Order of the British Empire (CBE) in the 2019 New Year Honours "for services to music", and was presented with the award by Prince William, Duke of Cambridge, at Buckingham Palace on 2 May 2019. On 24 July 2023, ahead of his Pompeii concert with his band Nick Mason's Saucerful of Secrets, he was awarded honorary citizenship of the Italian city of Pompeii.

== Discography ==
=== Solo albums ===
- Nick Mason's Fictitious Sports – 1 May 1981

=== Nick Mason's Saucerful of Secrets ===
- 2020: Live at the Roundhouse

Box set

- Unattended Luggage – 31 August 2018 (No. 94 UK Albums Chart)

=== With Rick Fenn ===
- Profiles – 29 July 1985
- Life Could Be a Dream – 1986 (soundtrack)
- White of the Eye – 1 January 1987 (soundtrack)
- Body Contact – 1987 (soundtrack, unreleased)
- Tank Malling – 1988 (soundtrack, unreleased)

=== With Michael Mantler ===
- The Hapless Child – 1976
- Something There – 1982
- Live – 1987
- Review – 2000
- Concertos – 2008

=== As a producer ===
- Screw – Banks of the River / Devil's Hour (1969), a 10" single, rel. on Shagrat Recs.
- Chimera – Chimera (1969/70; re-released 2002), w/ Rick Wright and Bob Weston collaborating
- Principal Edwards Magic Theatre – The Asmoto Running Band (1971)
- Principal Edwards Magic Theatre – Round One (1974)
- Robert Wyatt – Rock Bottom (1974)
  - The associated non-album single, "I'm a Believer"; Mason was a member of Wyatt's backing band when he performed the song on Top of the Pops
- Gong – Shamal (1976)
- The Damned – Music for Pleasure (1977)
- Steve Hillage – Green (1978); co-produced w/ Steve Hillage. Mason also plays drums on "Leylines to Glassdom"

=== Collaboration ===
- 2008: Robert Wyatt & Friends – Theatre Royal Drury Lane 8th September 1974 – With Hugh Hopper, Mike Oldfield, Dave Stewart, Fred Frith, Julie Tippetts, Ivor Cutler, etc.

== Books ==
- At the Limit: 21 Classic Race Cars That Shaped a Century of Motorsport (with Mark Hales): Motorbooks International (1998) ISBN 978-0760305706
- Into the Red: 22 Classic Cars That Shaped a Century of Motor Sport (with Mark Hales) – 3 September 1998 (first edition), 9 September 2004 (second edition)
- Inside Out: A Personal History of Pink Floyd – 28 October 2004
- Passion for Speed: Twenty-Four Classic Cars that Shaped a Century of Motor Sport (with Mark Hales): Carlton Books (2010) ISBN 978-1847326393
