= China Kong =

American actor, writer, and producer (born 1960)

China Kong (born 1960) is an American actress, writer, and producer. She is the widow of director Donald Cammell, having met him in 1974, when she was 14 years of age and he was 40. After having an affair, the couple married four years later, in 1978.

Her most noted acting role was in Cammell's 1987 film White of the Eye, which she also co-wrote.

China Kong's sister, Stephani Kong, acted as Brando's photographer on The Missouri Breaks and Superman.
