= Performance (film) =

1970 British film by Donald Cammell and Nicolas Roeg

- Theatrical release poster
- Directed by: Donald Cammell; Nicolas Roeg
- Written by: Donald Cammell
- Produced by: Sanford Lieberson
- Starring: James Fox; Mick Jagger; Anita Pallenberg; Michèle Breton
- Cinematography: Nicolas Roeg
- Edited by: Antony Gibbs; Brian Smedley-Aston
- Music by: Jack Nitzsche
- Production company: Goodtimes Enterprises
- Distributed by: Warner Bros.
- Release dates: 3 August 1970 (New York City); 7 January 1971 (London)
- Running time: 105 minutes
- Country: United Kingdom
- Language: English
- Budget: US$1.5 million

Performance is a 1970 British crime drama film directed by Donald Cammell and Nicolas Roeg, written by Cammell and filmed by Roeg. The film stars James Fox as a violent and ambitious London gangster who, after killing an old friend, goes into hiding at the home of a reclusive rock star (Mick Jagger).

The film was produced in 1968 but not released until 1970, as Warner Bros. was reluctant to distribute the film, owing to its sexual content and graphic violence. It initially received a mixed critical response, but its reputation has grown since then, and it is now regarded as one of the most influential and innovative films of the 1970s, as well as one of the greatest films in the history of British cinema. In 1999, Performance was voted the 48th greatest British film of the 20th century by the British Film Institute. In 2008 Empire magazine ranked the film 182nd on its list of the 500 Greatest Movies of All Time.

== Plot ==
Chas is a member of an East London gang, led by gangster Harry Flowers; his specialty is intimidation through violence, as he collects pay-offs for Flowers. Chas is very good at his job, and has a reputation for liking it. His sexual liaisons are casual and rough. When Flowers decides to take over a betting shop owned by Joey Maddocks, he forbids Chas to get involved because he feels Chas' complicated personal history with Maddocks may lead to trouble. Chas is angry about this and later humiliates Maddocks, who retaliates by wrecking Chas' apartment and attacking Chas, who in turn shoots him, packs a suitcase and runs from the scene.

When Flowers makes it clear that he has no intention of offering protection to Chas, but instead wants him eliminated, Chas decides to head for the countryside to hide out, but after overhearing a musician talk about going on tour and leaving his rented room in Notting Hill Gate, Chas goes there and pretends the musician was a friend who recommended him. He tells Pherber, a woman living there, that he is a fellow performer, juggler Johnny Dean. She lives there with Turner, a reclusive, eccentric former rock star who has 'lost his demon', and Lucy, with whom he enjoys a non-possessive and bisexual ménage à trois. Floating in and out of the house is a child, Lorraine.

At first, Chas is contemptuous of Turner, who himself attempts to return the rent paid in advance, but they start influencing each other. Pherber and Turner understand his conflict, and want to understand what makes him function so well within his world. To speed up the process, Pherber tricks him by feeding him a psychedelic mushroom, and Chas accuses her and Turner of poisoning him. He soon accepts it, and in his hallucinogenic state, he experiments with clothing and identity, including the wearing of feminine clothes. Chas opens up, and he begins a caring relationship with Lucy.

Before all this, he phones Tony (a trusted friend who refers to Chas as 'Uncle') to help him get out of the country. Flowers and his henchmen use Tony to track Chas to Turner's flat. They allow him to go and collect his things upstairs. Chas tells Turner and Pherber he is leaving, then shoots and kills Turner before being escorted into Flowers' car. As the car is driving away, Chas still wears his feminine clothes and wig, but his face is identical to Turner's.

== Cast ==
- James Fox as Chas
- Mick Jagger as Turner
- Anita Pallenberg as Pherber
- Michèle Breton as Lucy
- Ann Sidney as Dana
- John Bindon as Moody
- Stanley Meadows as Rosebloom
- Allan Cuthbertson as The Lawyer
- Anthony Morton as Dennis
- Johnny Shannon as Harry Flowers
- Anthony Valentine as Joey Maddocks
- Ken Colley as Tony Farrell
- John Sterland as The Chauffeur
- Laraine Wickens as Lorraine

== Production ==
=== Development ===
Performance was initially conceived by Donald Cammell as The Performers, and was to be a light-hearted swinging '60s romp. At one stage, Cammell's friend Marlon Brando (with whom he later collaborated on the posthumously published novel Fan Tan) was to play the gangster role of 'Chas'. At that stage, the story involved an American gangster hiding out in London. James Fox, previously cast in rather upper crust roles, eventually took the place of Brando, and spent several months in South London among the criminal underworld, researching his role.

As the project evolved, the story became significantly darker. Cammell was influenced by the Argentinian writer Jorge Luis Borges (whose portrait, on a book cover, can be seen at a crucial moment in the film), as he re-drafted the script to create an intense, intellectual film dealing with an identity crisis. The theories put forward by Antonin Artaud, on the links between performing and madness, also influenced Cammell, who—along with co-director Nicolas Roeg—was mainly responsible for the 'look' of the film. It also benefited from a lack of interference from studio executives at Warner Bros., who believed they were getting a Rolling Stones equivalent of The Beatles' playful A Hard Day's Night. Instead, Cammell and Roeg delivered a dark, experimental film which included graphic depictions of violence, sex and drug use. Warner Bros. financed the film with a budget of US$1.5 million.

It was intended that The Rolling Stones would write the soundtrack, but due to the complicated nature of the various relationships on and off-screen, this never happened. At the time of filming, there was fear from Keith Richards that Pallenberg, his partner, took part in real sex during the filming with his bandmate Mick Jagger. This was later confirmed to have happened by Ian Stewart, who was present on set. When Richards heard the rumours, he apparently took to sitting in his car outside the house where the film was being shot. Needless to say, this did not do much for the Jagger–Richards musical chemistry, and the soundtrack came together from a number of other sources.

=== Post-production ===
The content of Performance was a surprise to the studio. It has been reported that during a test screening, the wife of one Warner Bros. executive vomited in shock. In the series Hollywood UK: British Cinema of the Sixties (presented by Richard Lester, originally broadcast on 3 October 1993, and later repeated on BBC Four in 2005 and 2006), Roeg said that a Warner Bros. executive commented on the scene depicting Jagger in a bath with Pallenberg and Breton, "Even the bath water was dirty". The film was shelved by Ken Hyman, head of Warner Brothers, when he concluded that no amount of editing, re-looping, or rescheduling would cover up the fact that the picture ultimately made no sense. The response from the studio was to shelve the film from a cinematic release.

== Release ==
Performance was released in 1970, after major re-editing (performed by the uncredited Frank Mazzola, working under the close supervision of Cammell, with a brief from Warner Bros. to introduce Jagger earlier in the film) and changes in administration at Warner Bros. When the film was first released in the United States, the voices of a number of the actors in key roles were dubbed because the studio had feared that Americans would find their Cockney accents difficult to understand. Different edits were shown around the world, with the film gaining a following through to the late 1970s, by which time a variety of versions of varying quality could be seen in a handful of independent cinemas around London.

A commemorative event was held at London's ICA on 18 October 1997, incorporating a talk by film theorists (including, in the audience, Colin MacCabe, who went on to write a guide to the film), a screening of the uncut UK edition, and finally a question-and-answer session. Those in attendance included Fox (and family), Pallenberg, set designer Christopher Gibbs and Cammell's brother, who introduced part of a video interview with Donald, shot just before his death. Jagger was originally to appear but was committed to the Rolling Stones' Bridges to Babylon Tour.

In 2003, the British Film Institute financed a new print of Performance, which was premiered at the recently refurbished Electric Cinema in Portobello Road in London's Notting Hill (with an incognito Pallenberg in attendance). An individual member of a group of stalwart London based fans of the movie (which included the journalist Mick Brown) worked to ensure that any eventual DVD release was not merely a straight 'VHS to DVD' transfer of the dubbed VHS version (as was often the policy of Warner Bros. at the time) by making sure Warner Home Video (London) were fully aware of the new BFI-financed print.

=== Home media ===
After a period of campaigning with Warner Brothers in Burbank, the Region 1 DVD was released on 13 February 2007 and elsewhere soon after.

Although the film has undergone significant restoration, one famous line of dialogue—Jagger's 'Here's to old England!' heard during the sequence involving "Memo from Turner"—has been removed. This is because at this crucial stage of the film (the music sequence), one of the stereo sounds has been used on both channels. Other music and sound effects are also missing from this scene on the DVD release (some drums, the throbbing sound as Turner plugs a lead into his music generator, and the shrieking sound at the climax of his fluorescent light tube dance). These sounds, the dialogue and the music are all audible on other releases of the film. The voices of Harry Flowers (Johnny Shannon), Moody (John Bindon) and Lorraine, the young maid in Turner's mansion (Laraine Wickens), have been restored to the voices of the original actors.

In 2014, the Warner Archive Collection issued the film on Blu-ray in the United States.

In October 2022, The Criterion Channel made the film available for digital streaming, in a cut that restored the aforementioned sound effects and dialogue by Jagger which were not present on the DVD release. On 25 February 2025, The Criterion Collection released the film in 4K UHD Blu-ray and standard Blu-ray formats.

== Critical reception ==
=== Initial ===
Upon its initial release, Performance received mixed reviews. Roger Greenspun of The New York Times wrote that it "is not a very good movie", but the personalities of Jagger and Fox were enough to make it "the kind of all-round fun that in the movies is often tried but rarely so well achieved". Variety panned the film for "needless, boring sadism", a "dull" script, and "flat" performances. Charles Champlin of the Los Angeles Times called it a "pretentious and repellent little film" that "cannot rise above the world it pretends to examine".

Gene Siskel of the Chicago Tribune gave the film two-and-a-half stars out of four, writing that the first 40 minutes "crackle with excitement", but then "the pace slows down considerably, the nudity tires and the growing attraction of Fox for Jagger is unprepared for". Gary Arnold of The Washington Post wrote that the film was suggestive of "Mickey Spillane trying to write like Harold Pinter" and that filmmakers Cammell and Roeg had done a "fundamentally rotten" job, regularly "upstaging the action and the actors with tricky (and often unintelligible) sound recording and "striking" composition. Oddly enough, they may have stumbled into a cult hit".

Richard Schickel of Life described the film as "the most disgusting, the most completely worthless film I have seen since I began reviewing". By way of contrast, Jan Dawson of The Monthly Film Bulletin called it "the kind of brilliant, baffling film about which it would be marginally more easy to write a book than a review ... though visually dazzling, wittily and literately scripted, and brilliantly conceived, the film inevitably derives much of its strength from its performers, nearly all of whom achieve a near-symbiotic relationship with their roles".

=== Retrospective ===
In the late 1970s and 1980s, Performance gradually acquired a cult following on the late night and repertory cinema circuits. By the 1990s, it had undergone a critical reappraisal. The film has become canonised by many theorists of British cinema, who have suggested it is iconic within the British gangster genre. This is primarily due to its reflection of the coexistence of the criminal world of the East End and the bohemian culture in London during the 1960s and 1970s.

In 1995, Performance appeared at number thirty in a Time Out "all-time greats" poll of critics and directors. After Cammell's death in 1996, the film's reputation grew still further. It is often cited as a classic of British cinema.

In the September–October 2009 issue of Film Comment, Jagger's Turner was voted the best performance by a musician in a film.

In an introduction before the film's screening on Sky Indie, Quentin Tarantino cited Performance as "one of the best rock movies of all time". He praised James Fox's performance as his favourite British gangster portrayal in cinema, and expressed admiration for the film's exploration of the darker side of the 1960s psychedelic dream.

In his fifteen-hour documentary The Story of Film: An Odyssey, Mark Cousins says: "Performance was not only the greatest seventies film about identity; if any movie in the whole Story of Film should be compulsory viewing for film makers, maybe this is it".

On the review aggregator website Rotten Tomatoes, 80% of 35 critics' reviews are positive, with an average rating of 8.0/10. The website's consensus reads: "Performance is an exuberant and grimy ode to the sexual revolution, evoking cultural upheaval and identity crisis with rock 'n' roll verve and a beguiling turn by Mick Jagger." Metacritic, which uses a weighted average, assigned the film a score of 69 out of 100, based on 14 critics, indicating "generally favorable" reviews.

== Influence ==
Several aspects of Performance were novel, and it foreshadowed MTV-type music videos (particularly the sequence with "Memo from Turner", in which Jagger sings) and many popular films of the 1990s and 2000s.

- The gangster aspect of Performance has been imitated by many popular directors such as Quentin Tarantino, Guy Ritchie and Jonathan Glazer.
- Performance pushed boundaries by featuring explicit sex scenes and drugs, which have been rumoured to be real instead of simulated. Although the films of Andy Warhol (and other underground filmmakers) had featured such behaviour before Performance, it was unprecedented that they appeared in a studio production.
- The song "E=MC²", by Big Audio Dynamite, contains extensive dialogue samples from Performance.
- The song "Further Back and Faster", recorded by Coil for their album Love's Secret Domain, also contains dialogue samples from the film.
- The second Happy Mondays album, Bummed, features several songs inspired by Performance, including "Moving in With", "Performance" and "Mad Cyril" (the latter of which contains dialogue from the film).
- In keeping with the intellectual bent of Jagger's character, the Argentine writer Jorge Luis Borges is quoted on numerous occasions during the film. His photograph appears in the brief montage that follows the shooting of Turner.
- Beat the Devil, the BMW promo film directed by Tony Scott and starring James Brown, Gary Oldman and Clive Owen, contains at least two references to Performance: at one point, Owen's character says 'I know a thing or two about performing'—a quote from Turner; while The Devil, played by Oldman, dances with a fluorescent tube, just as Turner does in Performance. In the earlier Tony Scott film True Romance, Oldman (as Drexl) is seen swinging a lamp-shade back and forth in front of someone, as Turner does during the sequence involving "Memo from Turner".
- The comic series The League of Extraordinary Gentlemen, Volume III: Century, by Alan Moore and Kevin O'Neill, makes several references to Performance in its second issue, "Paint it Black", prominently featuring Jagger's Turner character (though with the name "Turner" spelt "Terner" to avoid copyright infringement). The plot of the issue is about The Stones in the Park concert that took place after the death of Brian Jones and shows just how Turner 'lost his demon', which in this case is a literal demon, i.e., a demonic possession. In the world of The League of Extraordinary Gentlemen, Turner takes the role that Jagger had in reality with the analogue of The Rolling Stones band called "The Purple Orchestra".
- The soundtrack song "Harry Flowers" was inspired by the character in the film, and was covered by William Orbit on his album Strange Cargo III.

== Soundtrack ==
The soundtrack album was released by Warner Bros. Records on 19 September 1970. It features Jagger, Ry Cooder, Randy Newman, The Last Poets, Buffy Sainte-Marie and Merry Clayton.

== Paperback novelisation ==
A novelisation of Donald Cammell's screenplay was published in 1970, under the by-line William Hughes (the publishing identity of Hugh Williams, a British author who seems never to have written under his own name, nor to have written anything but a diverse catalogue of screenplay novelisations). It was released by Tandem Books in the UK and Award Books in the US.

== See also ==
- BFI Top 100 British films
- List of cult films
- List of films featuring hallucinogens
- List of British films of 1970

== Sources ==
- Catterall, Ali; Wells, Simon (2002). Your Face Here: British Cult Movies Since The Sixties. Fourth Estate. ISBN 978-0-007-14554-6.
- Farmer, Farmer Richard (2019). Transformation and Tradition in 1960s British Cinema. Edinburgh, Scotland: Edinburgh University Press. ISBN 978-1-474-42314-4.
- Peary, Danny (1981). Cult Movies: The Classics, The Sleepers, The Weird and the Wonderful. New York City, New York: Gramercy Books. ISBN 978-0-517-20185-5.
- Winder, Elizabeth (2023). Parachute Women: Marianne Faithfull, Marsha Hunt, Bianca Jagger, Anita Pallenberg, and the Women Behind the Rolling Stones. New York City, New York: Hachette Books. ISBN 978-1-580-05958-9.

=== Further reading ===
- MacCabe, Colin (1 July 1998). Performance. BFI Film Classics. London: BFI Publishing. ISBN 0-85170-670-3.
- Brown, Mick (20 November 1999). Mick Brown on Performance. Bloomsbury Movie Guides. Bloomsbury USA. ISBN 1-58234-043-9.
- Buck, Paul (10 September 2012). Performance: The Biography of a 60s Masterpiece. Omnibus Press. ISBN 978-1-84938-700-2.
