= List of freemen of the City of Birmingham =

Below is a list of Honorary Freemen of the City of Birmingham.

== List ==
The City of Birmingham, England has granted Honorary Freedom to individuals and military organisations since 1888. Designation as a Freeman of the City is an honorary title and, subject to a two-thirds majority of the Council, is granted to persons of distinction and those who have rendered eminent services to the City. The following have received this honour (up to 1998):

Picture	Name	Received
	Joseph Chamberlain	20 March 1888
	Philip Henry Muntz	23 October 1888
	Thomas Avery	4 October 1892
	George Dixon	4 January 1898
	John Thackray Bunce	7 March 1899
	Frederick Roberts, 1st Earl Roberts	1 January 1901
	Edward Lawley Parker	31 October 1904
	Jesse Collings	13 June 1911
	William Kenrick	13 June 1911
	Frances Corder Clayton	2 July 1912
	Charles Gabriel Beale	2 July 1912
	Sir William Henry Bowater	4 January 1916
	William Moris Hughes	22 May 1916
	David Lloyd George	5 February 1921
	Earl Balfour	22 June 1922
	Sir George Hamilton Kenrick	25 September 1923
	Sir David Brooks	25 September 1923
	Sir Austen Chamberlain	22 February 1926
	Barrow Cadbury	6 May 1932
	Neville Chamberlain	6 May 1932
	John Henry Lloyd	6 May 1932
	Ernest Martineau	11 July 1938
	William Adlington Cadbury	11 July 1938
	Wilfred Byng Kenrick	11 July 1938
	Henry James Sayer	11 July 1938
	Jan Christiaan Smuts	19 May 1944
	Winston Leonard Spencer Churchill	31 October 1946
	The Royal Warwickshire Regiment	1946
	Clement Attlee	18 October 1947
	Sir William J. Slim	18 October 1947
	Sir Frank Henry Cufaude Wiltshire	18 October 1947
	Harrison Barrow	12 April 1949
	Ann Marie Howes	16 April 1955
	Sir Barry V. Jackson	16 April 1955
	Sir Sydney Vernon	16 April 1955
	Sir T. B. Pritchett	7 May 1960
	Sir Albert Frederick Bradbeer	7 May 1960
	268 Regiment, Royal Artillery TA	4 June 1966
	Sir Francis. F. Griffin	2 May 1970
	Harry Watton	2 May 1970
	35th Signal Regiment	12 September 1970
	Ernest Walter Horton	15 September 1973
	Eric Edward Mole	15 September 1973
	Royal Regiment of Fusiliers	7 May 1975
	HMS Birmingham	11 May 1978
	Sir Neville Bruce Alfred Bosworth	4 December 1982
	Sir George Adrian Hayhurst Cadbury	4 December 1982
	Julius Silverman	4 December 1982
	Queen's Own Hussars	4 October 1983
	Marjorie Alice Brown	25 October 1986
	Freda Mary Cocks	25 October 1986
	Sir Reginald E. Eyre	23 February 1991
	Denis Howell, Baron Howell of Aston Manor	23 February 1991
	Sir Simon D. Rattle	1 October 1996
	Lisa Clayton	1 October 1996
	Royal British Legion (Birmingham County Branch)	2 October 2010
	Peter Hollingworth	14 June 2011
	RAF Cosford	19 May 2018
	Terence "Geezer" Butler	30 June 2025
	Tony Iommi	30 June 2025
	Ozzy Osbourne	30 June 2025
	Bill Ward	30 June 2025
