= Middlemore baronets =

Extinct baronetcy in the Baronetage of the United Kingdom

The Middlemore Baronetcy, of Selly Oak in the Parish of Northfield in the County of Worcester, was a title in the Baronetage of the United Kingdom. It was created on 27 May 1919 for John Middlemore, previously Member of Parliament for Birmingham North. The title became extinct on the death of the second Baronet, who had no heirs, in 1987.

== Middlemore baronets, of Selly Oak (1919) ==
- Sir John Throgmorton Middlemore, 1st Baronet (1844–1924)
- Sir William Hawkslow Middlemore, 2nd Baronet (1908–1987)
