= Grove Park, Birmingham =

Park in Birmingham, England

Grove Park
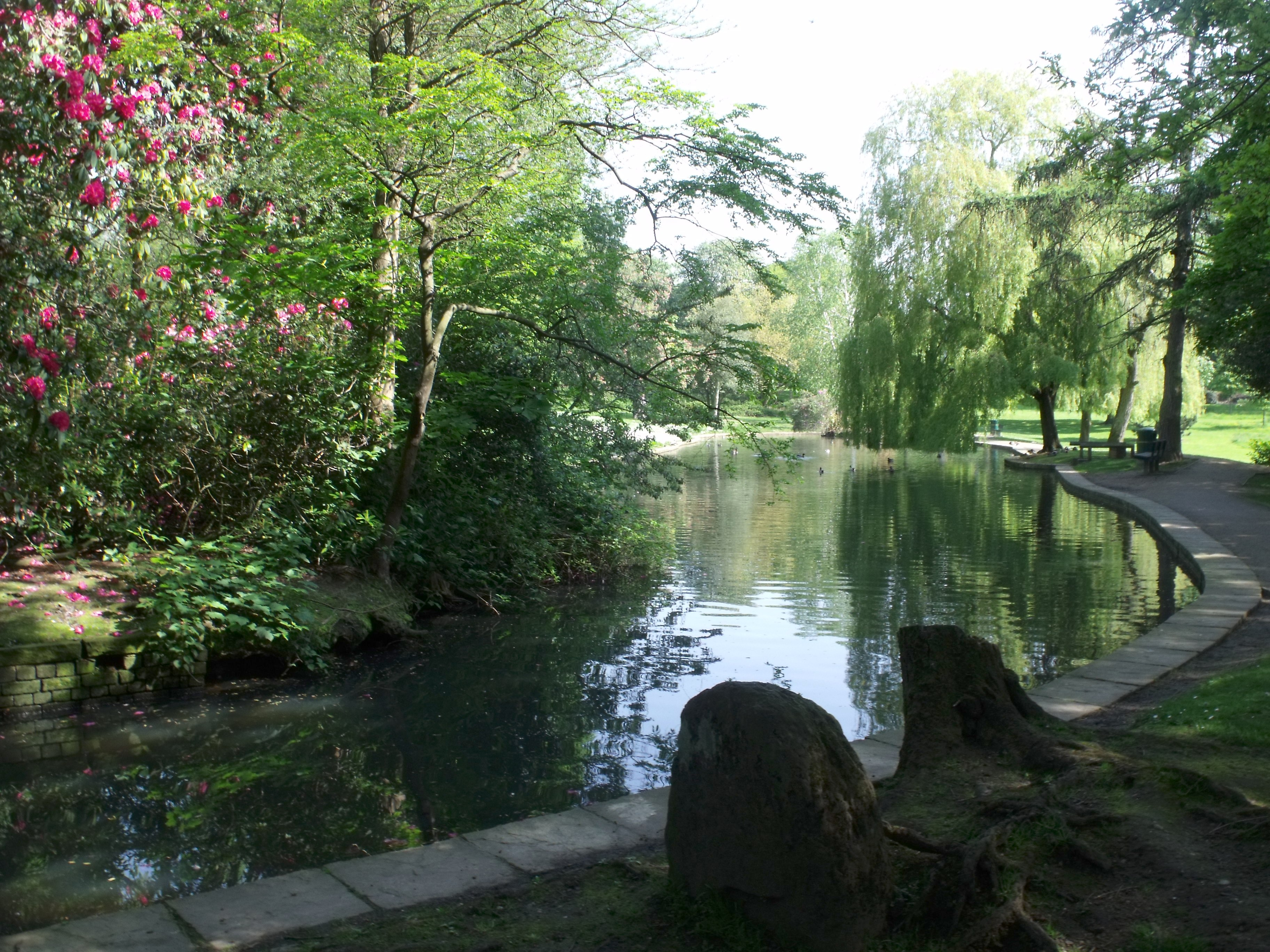
- Grove Park
- Interactive map of Grove Park
- Type: Public park
- Location: Harborne, Birmingham, England
- Coordinates: 52.45°N 1.95°W
- Created: 1963
- Operator: Birmingham City Council

Grove Park is a public park in Harborne, Birmingham, England, created in 1963 and managed by Birmingham City Council. It lies on the west side of Harborne Park Road, which forms part of the A4040 outer ring road.

== History ==
The park was historically the grounds of The Grove, an 18th-century Georgian house.

One of Birmingham's first MPs, Thomas Attwood, lived at The Grove between 1823 and 1846. Attwood is immortalised in a bronze statue which is sat on the steps of Chamberlain Square.

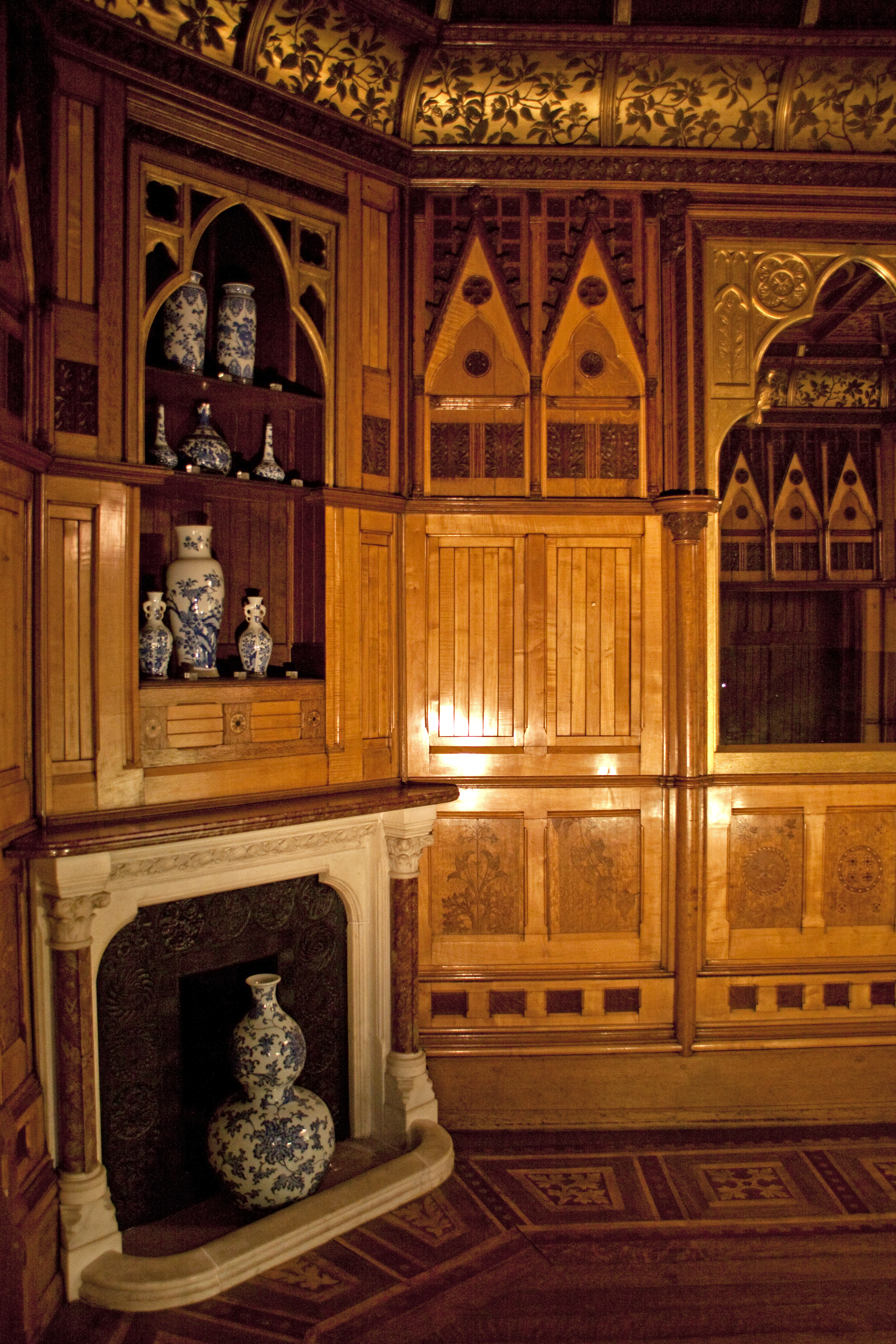
Ante-room from the Grove Harborne 1877

The house was rebuilt in 1877–78, by John Henry Chamberlain for William Kenrick, a prominent Birmingham businessman and MP for Birmingham North. Kenrick died at The Grove, aged 88 in 1919.

The house and grounds were bequeathed to Birmingham City Council, the house was demolished in 1963, after which the grounds became a public space. A panelled anteroom of the drawing room at The Grove was saved from destruction and acquired by the Victoria and Albert Museum in London. The room was used to display Kendrick's collection of blue and white ceramics.
