= Charles Beale =

Charles Beale may refer to:

- Charles Gabriel Beale (1843–1912), Lord Mayor of Birmingham
- Charles Lewis Beale (1824–1899), U.S. congressman
