= Sir William Beale, 1st Baronet =

William Beale

Sir William Phipson Beale, 1st Baronet, KC (29 October 1839 – 13 April 1922) was a British barrister and Liberal Party politician.

== Family and education ==
The family of which William Phipson Beale was a member was a well-established merchant family in Birmingham by the late 18th century. They produced lawyers, businessmen and politicians. They had commercial interests in banking, railways and ironworks and were associated through business, marriage or politics to many other well-known Birmingham figures. His younger brother Charles, was uncle to Neville Chamberlain and another brother, James, commissioned Philip Webb to design Standen, West Sussex, now in the ownership of the National Trust.

Beale was the eldest son of William John Beale from Birmingham. His grandfather William Beale lived at Camp Hill. His mother was Martha Phipson. She too came from a Birmingham family, with a home in Edgbaston. Beale was born in Edgbaston and first educated at the Birmingham and Edgbaston Proprietary School. He later pursued his education at Heidelberg University and in Paris. In 1857, he became member of the Corps Rhenania Heidelberg. In 1869, he married Mary Thompson from Sydney, New South Wales. They never had children.

== Career ==
Beale first worked in the iron trade in what appears to be one of the family's many concerns, Samuel Beale and Co. of Park Gate, Rotherham. But Beale's father was a solicitor practising in Birmingham and the son too wished to go in for the law. He was called to the Bar by Lincoln's Inn in 1867, became Queen's Counsel in 1888, in honour of which he was presented to the Prince of Wales, and a Bencher in 1892.

== Politics ==
A Liberal in politics, Beale tried hard to become a Member of Parliament. He first stood as a Parliamentary candidate at the 1885 general election at Tamworth. In 1889, he was selected to contest the by-election in Birmingham Central on the death of the sitting Liberal Unionist member John Bright but lost to Bright's son, John Albert Bright. In 1891, he was again chosen to fight a by-election, this time at Aston Manor but again he was unsuccessful.

He did not contest a seat at the general elections of 1895 or 1900 but he was selected as candidate for the marginal seat of South Ayrshire in time for the 1906 general election when he was finally elected to Parliament. Whilst an MP he voted in favour of the 1908 Women's Enfranchisement Bill. He held the seat until 1918 when he stood down.

Politics was in the Beale family DNA. Beale's uncle was Samuel Beale (1803–1874), Mayor of Birmingham in 1841 and Liberal MP for Derby from 1857 to 1865. His younger brother, Alderman Charles Gabriel Beale (1843–1912), was Lord Mayor of Birmingham three times in the period between 1897 and 1905.

== Honours and appointments ==
Escutcheon of the Beale baronets of Drumlamford

In 1912 Beale was created a baronet, of Drumlamford in the County of Ayr. In private life, Beale took a serious interest in chemistry and geology. He was a Fellow of the Chemical Society and a Fellow of the Geological Society. He specialised in crystallography and mineralogy and was sometime President of the Mineralogical Society. In 1915 he published An Amateur's Introduction to Crystallography.

== Death ==
On Beale's death at Dorking in April 1922, aged 82, the baronetcy became extinct. His funeral took place at Golders Green Crematorium on 19 April 1922 attended by family members, politicians and representatives of scientific organisations.

Parliament of the United Kingdom
Preceded by William Arrol	Member of Parliament for South Ayrshire; 1906–1918	Succeeded by James Brown
Baronetage of the United Kingdom
New creation	Baronet (of Drumlamford); 1912–1922	Extinct
Preceded by Poë baronets	Beale baronets of Drumlamford; 3 July 1912	Succeeded by Claughton baronets
