= 1899 Birmingham North by-election =

UK parliamentary by-election

The 1899 Birmingham North by-election was a parliamentary by-election held for the UK House of Commons constituency of Birmingham North on 14 February 1899.

== Vacancy ==
The vacancy was caused by the resignation of the sitting Liberal Unionist MP, the Rt Hon Alderman William Kenrick. Kenrick had held the seat since its creation in 1885, first as a Liberal and then as a Liberal Unionist. At the 1895 general election, Kenrick had defended the seat against Liberal opposition, holding it with nearly 80% of the poll.

== Candidates ==
William Kenrick was married to Mary Chamberlain, the elder sister of Joseph Chamberlain and the Liberal Unionists first offered the candidacy to another close associate of the Chamberlain family, Edward Nettlefold (1854-1909), a local manufacturer of screws and other goods, in partnership with Joseph Chamberlain, but he turned down the approach. They next turned to John Throgmorton Middlemore, a 54-year-old former member of Birmingham City Council. Middlemore had trained as a solicitor but had never practised. He received income from a leather business and was the founder and chief benefactor of Middlemore Emigration Homes, an organisation which trained destitute children and settled them in Canada. On 25 January, the Liberal Unionists’ local Conservative allies passed a resolution congratulating Kenrick on being made a Privy Counsellor and voted to support Middlemore as the representative of Unionism in the forthcoming by-election.

The writ ordering the by-election was moved in Parliament on 8 February 1899 by Sir William Walrond, the government Chief Whip and was received by the Lord Mayor of Birmingham a day later. The 14 February was set for receipt of nominations.

The North Birmingham Liberals had done poorly against Kenrick in the two previous general elections in 1892 and 1895 and on 25 January they considered their position at a meeting of their Parliamentary Committee. They resolved that “...this committee, while asserting its loyalty to Liberal principles, is of the opinion, in view of the contest in 1895, and the acceptability, from a non-political standpoint, of the candidate chosen by the Liberal Unionists and Tories, and in view of the approaching general election, that the present time is not a suitable opportunity ...to contest the strength of political parties in North Birmingham.”

There being no other nominations therefore, Middlemore was returned unopposed.

== Result ==
Birmingham North by-election, 1899
Party	Candidate	Votes	%	±%
Liberal Unionist	John Throgmorton Middlemore	Unopposed	N/A	N/A
Liberal Unionist hold				

== See also ==
- List of United Kingdom by-elections
- United Kingdom by-election records
