= Hubert Humphrey (disambiguation) =

Hubert Humphrey (1911–1978) was the 38th vice president of the United States.

Hubert Humphrey may also refer to:

- Skip Humphrey (Hubert H. Humphrey III, born 1942), Minnesotan politician, son of Hubert Humphrey
- Hubert Humphrey (businessman) (born 1942), American businessman, financial executive, and insurance broker

== See also ==
- Hubert H. Humphrey Metrodome, a stadium in Minneapolis
- Hubert Humphreys (1878–1967), British socialist activist
