= J. F. Kennedy Memorial, Birmingham =

Mosaic by Kenneth Budd

J. F. Kennedy Memorial
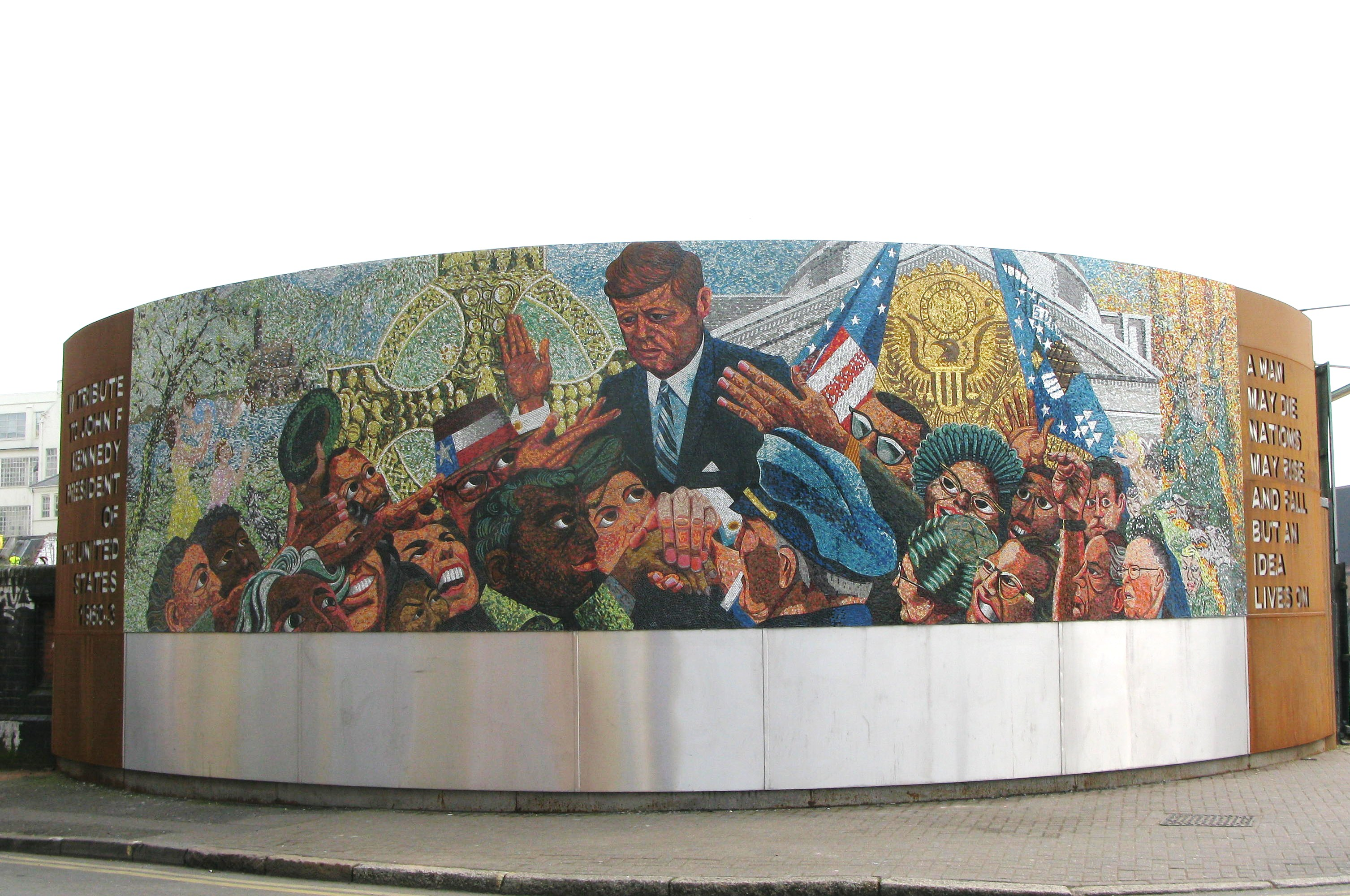
- The completed recreation, February 2013 (Former Birmingham mayor Nangle visible bottom right)
- Artist: Kenneth Budd
- Year: 1968
- Type: Mosaic mural
- Subject: John F. Kennedy
- Dimensions: 4.5 m × 14 m (15 ft × 46 ft)
- Condition: Recreated 2012–2013
- Location: Birmingham, England; 52.474950°N 1.886312°W

The J. F. Kennedy Memorial in Birmingham, England, is a memorial mosaic mural to John F. Kennedy, by Kenneth Budd.

The mosaic, commissioned by Birmingham's Irish community and unveiled in 1968, and funded by public subscription, was constructed in panels, at Budd's company in south London, Kenneth Budd and Associates.

It was dismantled in 2007 and remade, with alterations, in 2012, by the artist's son, for erection at a new site.

== Original location ==
The mosaic was erected on St Chad's Circus (at approx 52.485451°N 1.900173°W), outside the City's Roman Catholic St Chad's Cathedral, in July 1968, at a cost of £5,000. When the road system was redeveloped in 2007 the mosaic was demolished. Key features, including the heads of some of the main figures, were retrieved and retained by Kenneth Budd's son Oliver.

== Re-creation ==
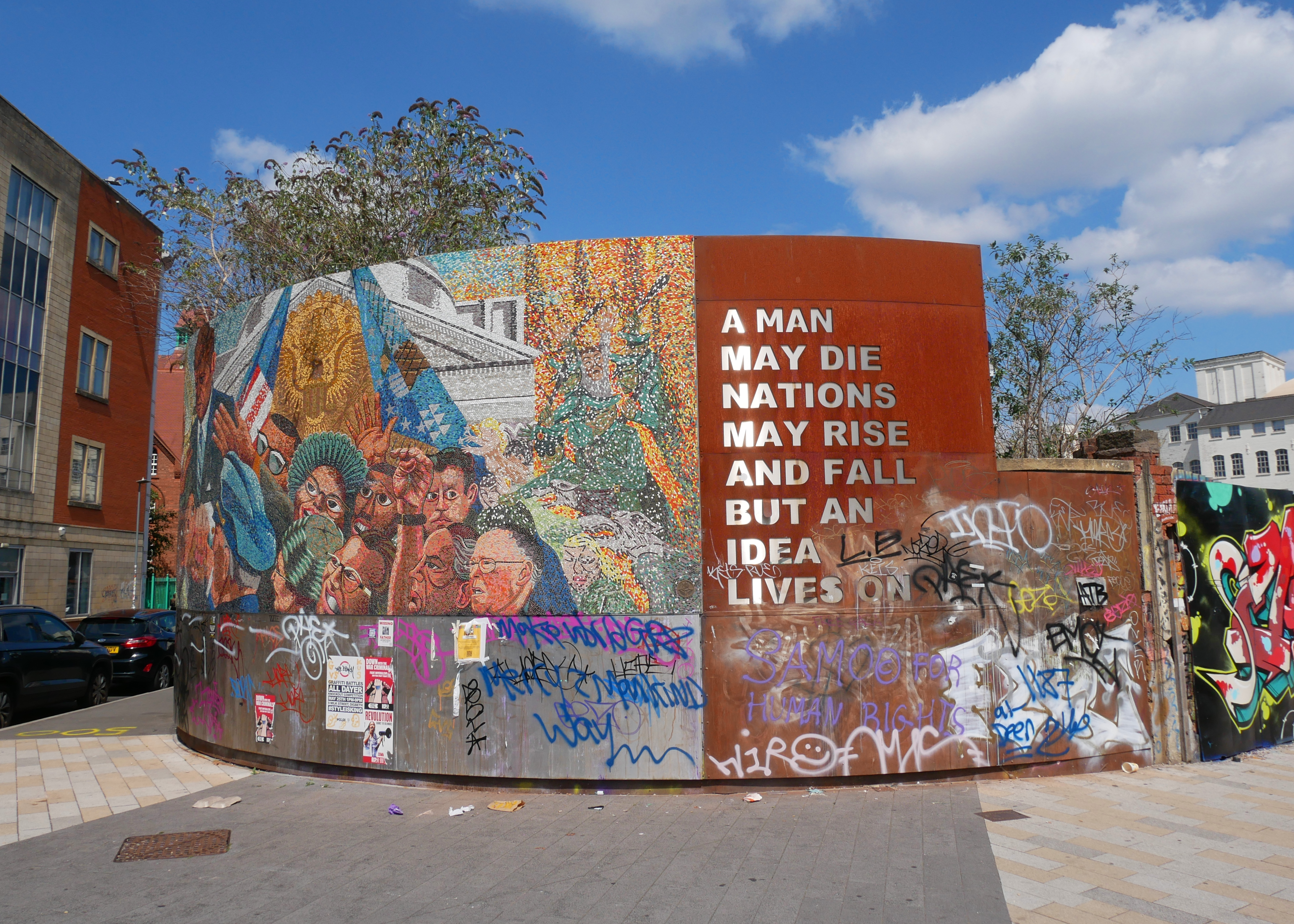
The memorial

In 2012 it was re-created using new materials. The new mosaic was erected in January 2013, in the city's Irish Quarter, on Floodgate Street in Digbeth, in reworked form, including the controversial addition of a new face, that of former Lord Mayor of Birmingham Mike Nangle, the city's first Irish Lord Mayor. The work was overseen by Budd's son, Oliver, who worked from his father's original drawings. The retained sections were not used as the colours had faded and would not match the new Smalti mosaic tiles. A formal unveiling took place on 23 February 2013.

== Composition ==
Featured alongside Kennedy in the mosaic are his brother Ted, the seal of the president of the United States (using real gold), Martin Luther King Jr., American policemen, and other figures.

== Text ==
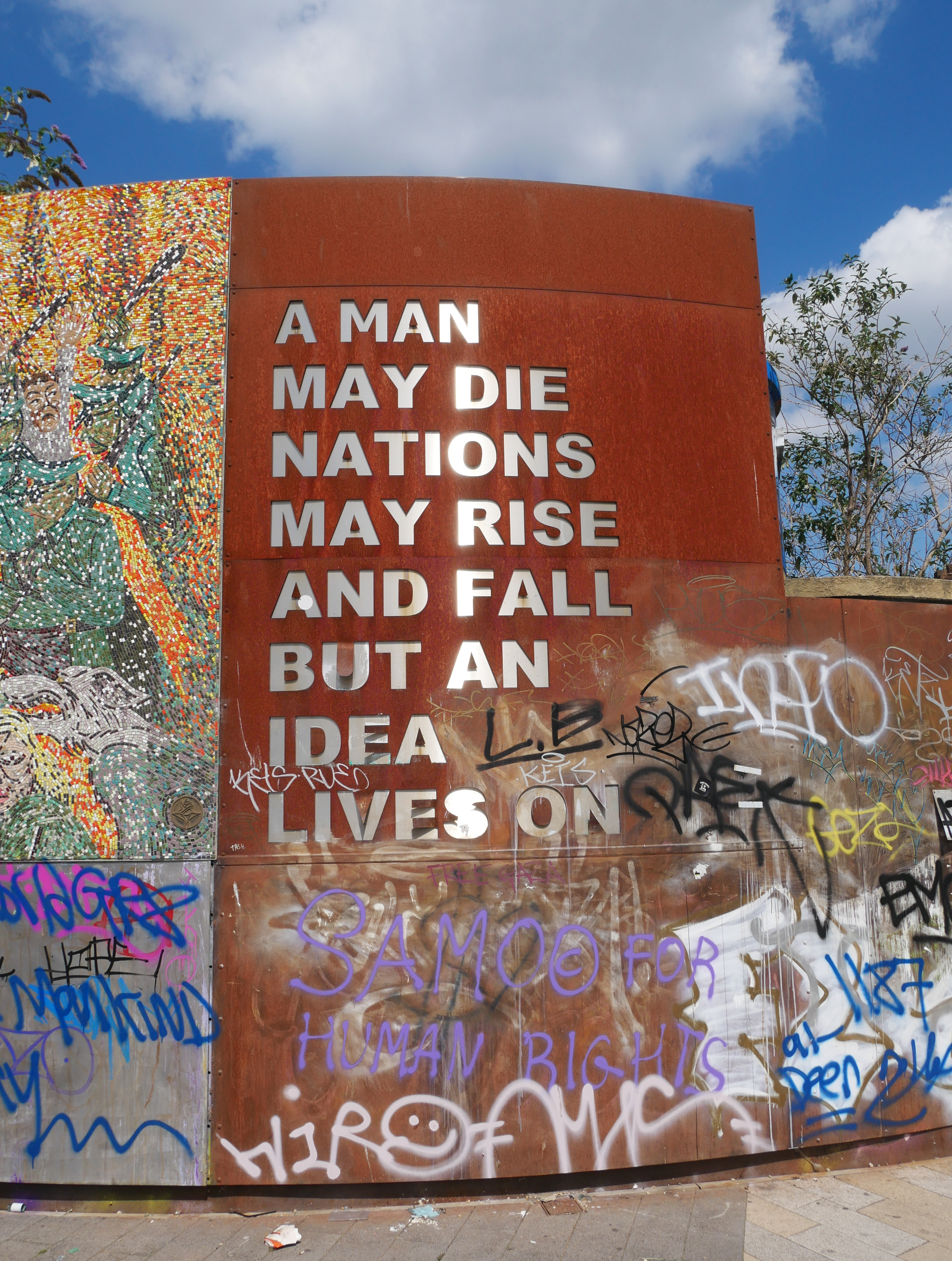
Text on the monument

The text gives an incorrect date of 1960, the year he was elected, for the start of his presidency, when he was actually president from January 1961. This inaccuracy was also present in the original creation.

The original mosaic had wording at either side. The wording on the right said (all in upper case):

There are
no white or
coloured
signs on
the grave-
yards of
battle

The recreated mosaic has different words. On the left (again, all in upper case):

In tribute
to John F
Kennedy
President
of
the United
States
1960-3

and to the right:

A man
may die
nations
may rise
and fall
but an
idea
lives on

== See also ==
- List of memorials to John F. Kennedy
- Cultural depictions of John F. Kennedy
- List of buildings and monuments honoring presidents of the United States in other countries
