= Jesse Collings =

British politician (1831–1920)

The Right Honourable Jesse Collings
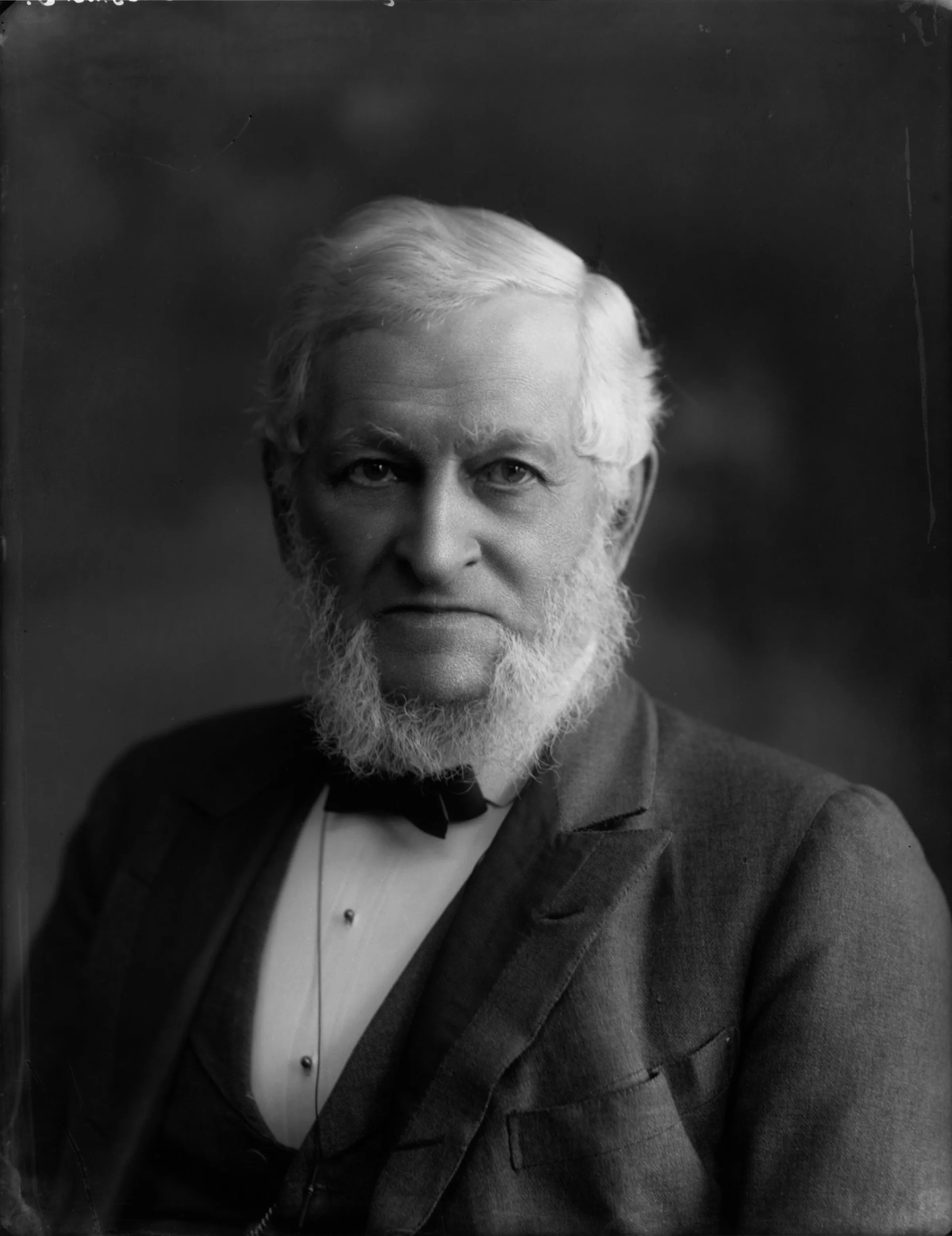
- Collings in c. 1908

Parliamentary Secretary to the Local Government Board
- In office 1886–1886
- Monarch: Victoria
- Preceded by: The Earl Brownlow
- Succeeded by: William Copeland Borlase

Personal details
- Born: 2 December 1831
- Died: 20 November 1920 (aged 88)
- Spouse: Emily Oxenbould (m. 1858)
- Children: 1 daughter

Jesse Collings PC (2 December 1831 – 20 November 1920) was Mayor of Birmingham, England, a Liberal (later Liberal Unionist) member of Parliament, but was best known nationally in the UK as an advocate of educational reform and land reform.

== Background ==
Collings was the youngest son of Thomas Collings, Littleham-cum-Exmouth, Devon, and Annie Palmer. His father was a bricklayer, who later established a small building firm. He was educated at a Dame School and for a time at Church House School, Stoke, Plymouth. He started work as a shop assistant aged 15 years, later becoming a clerk and a traveller for an ironmongery firm. In 1850, he started working for Booth and Company, a firm of ironmongers in Birmingham; in 1864 he became a partner in the renamed business, Collings and Wallis. In 1879, he retired from the partnership. He came under the influence of George Dawson, worshipped, along with other prominent families, in Dawson's Church of the Saviour, and became an adherent of Dawson's doctrine of the "Civic Gospel".

In 1858 he married Emily Oxenbould, the daughter of a master at King Edward's Grammar School, Birmingham. They had one daughter.

== Birmingham Town Council ==
He was a close friend of Joseph Chamberlain and supported the radical group around Chamberlain in developing local improvement schemes in Birmingham, parks, and what at the time was called "gas-and-water socialism". He took over practical management of the education committee and served as Mayor of Birmingham in 1878–79. He was responsible for free public libraries in Birmingham and was the original proponent of the Birmingham Art Gallery funded from the profits of the gas company.

== Free education ==
Early on, Collings had shown an interest in education by helping to found the Devon and Exeter Boys Industrial School in 1862. He visited America to study its education system and published An Outline of the American School System in 1868. This pamphlet recommended that a similar free and non-sectarian (non-denominational) form of school education to that of the United States should be set up in England and Wales. Collings' pamphlet led directly to the formation of the National Education League by Birmingham Liberals in 1869, with George Dixon as President and Jesse Collings as Secretary. The League became a major campaigning organisation, but the Elementary Education Act 1870 retained the dominance of church schools in providing education for the young in England, Wales and Ireland. Collings called for Local Authorities to be obliged to set up sufficient schools to enable all children to attend; these schools should be inspected by the state and managed by local government; they should be free; and attendance should be compulsory. Collings also advocated the education of women, signing a petition seeking to award degrees to female students at the University of Cambridge in 1880.

== Land reform ==
Collings' background in Devon gave him an appreciation of the problems of the agricultural worker and small-scale farmer rare in a major industrial city like Birmingham. He was a friend of Joseph Arch, the founder of the National Agricultural Labourers Union, who lived in Barford, Warwickshire, near Birmingham. Collings believed that education was essential to improving the conditions of agricultural workers and that it needed to be free. The National Agricultural Workers Union joined the National Education League. Collings ensured that Chamberlain, Mayor of Birmingham and a millionaire industrialist, chaired the meeting in Birmingham to support the Agricultural Workers' first strike. When Chamberlain became President of the Board of Trade, Collings acted as his unofficial advisor on agricultural matters affecting peasants in Britain and Ireland.

Collings advocated land reform through providing allotments and small holdings for the rural poor, landless peasants, and even the industrial poor. He cited the Chartist settlement at Great Dodford as a successful example of what could be achieved. The slogan for Collings' 1885 land-reform campaign Three Acres and a Cow became the battle cry of land reform and the fight against rural poverty. Three acres and a cow was seen as being sufficient for a family to live on, particularly when compared to the rural poverty common at that time. To some, however, this slogan was backward looking and the source of amusement amongst many Conservatives and farmers.

Joseph Chamberlain adapted the Three Acres and a Cow slogan for his own Radical Programme: he urged the purchase by local authorities of land to provide garden and field allotments for all labourers who might desire them, to be let at fair rents in plots of up to 1-acre (0.40 ha) of arable and three to 4 acres (1.6 ha) of pasture.

Collings founded the Allotments Extension Association in 1883 to promote the formation of allotments and smallholdings. He also collaborated closely with the Highland Land Reform Association.

The 1882 Allotments Extension Act was put through Parliament by Collings. By 1886 there were 394,517 allotments of under 4 acres (16,000 m^{2}) and 272,000 garden allotments (Haywood, 1991).

In 1886, Collings' work defeated Lord Salisbury's Government, which lost the vote on the Queen's speech, when Collings moved his 'Small Holdings Amendment Act'. A Liberal Government under William Ewart Gladstone took its place.

Collings' work also led to 1908 Small Holdings and Allotments Act (which led to 30,000 families being resettled on the land) and the 1919 Land Settlement Act. However, the programme of land reform via allotments and small holdings never made a considerable impact upon the countryside, either in Collings' time or in the interwar period.

== Member of Parliament ==
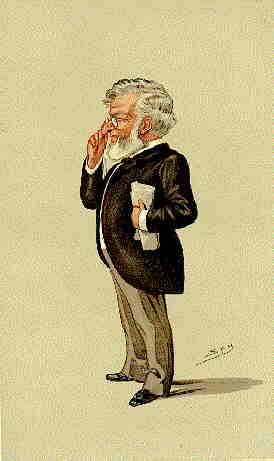
A caricature of Jesse Collings in Vanity Fair, 1888. The caption was "3 acres and a cow".

He was Liberal Member of Parliament (MP) for Ipswich from 1880 until he was unseated on petition in April 1886, and then for Birmingham Bordesley from 1886 until 1918 (until 1912 as a Liberal Unionist, when the party was wound up, thereafter as a Conservative).

On Chamberlain's recommendation, Collings served in Gladstone's administration as Parliamentary Secretary to the Local Government Board in 1886, although at a reduced salary. Collings joined the Liberal Unionist group set up by Chamberlain in 1886 as a result of the split with the Gladstonian Liberals over Ireland. Collings served in Salisbury's government as Under-Secretary of State for the Home Department from 1895 to 1902.

Although he served in Parliament from 1880 (with a small interruption) and was a junior minister in two Governments, he was most influential outside Parliament – his ministerial posts were not connected to his lifelong advocacy of free education and land reform. He was appointed a Privy Counsellor in 1892.

== As a Liberal Unionist ==
The concern of Liberal Unionists was that what they perceived as the need for important reforms was being subordinated to a preoccupation with Ireland. The land reform movement was split. Joseph Arch remained a Gladstonian Liberal and ensured that Collings was deposed from the Allotments Extension Association. Collings later set up the Rural Labourers' League, which supported land reform and advocated tariffs on imported food to support the rural economy. Collings proposed a system of vocational education through free schools in rural areas. Erroneously or not, Collings along with Chamberlain and others believed that land reform in Ireland would give the peasants a stake in the country and reduce poverty, but convinced neither the Liberals nor the Conservatives to attempt it.

He was made an Honorary Freeman of the City of Birmingham in 1911.

Collings published Land Reform in 1906 and in 1914 The Colonization of Rural Britain. He also published The Great War: Its Lessons and Warnings in 1915.

Collings continued to be active in promoting land reform until 1918, when he retired from Parliament on the abolition of his seat when he was then aged 87 and oldest member of the House. He died in November 1920 aged 88.

== Portrait ==
A portrait of Collings, painted circa 1885, by Jonathan Pratt (1835–1911), hangs in Birmingham Council House. It is not in a public area but may be viewed by prior application.

== Sources ==
- Collings, J. and Green, J. L. (1920) The life of Jesse Collings (2 vols).

Parliament of the United Kingdom
Preceded by Thomas Clement Cobbold and James Redfoord Bulwer	Member of Parliament for Ipswich; 1880–1886; With: Thomas Clement Cobbold, to 1883; Henry Wyndham West, from 1883	Succeeded by Sir Charles Dalrymple and Lord Elcho
Preceded by Henry Broadhurst	Member of Parliament for Birmingham Bordesley; 1886–1918	Constituency abolished
Preceded by Samuel Young	Oldest Member of Parliament (not Father of the House); 1918	Succeeded by Matthew Vaughan-Davies
Political offices
Preceded by The Earl Brownlow	Parliamentary Secretary to the Local Government Board; 1886	Succeeded by William Copeland Borlase
Preceded by George W. E. Russell	Under-Secretary of State for the Home Department; 1895–1902	Succeeded by Thomas Cochrane
