= George Henry Wilson Griffith =

George Henry Wilson Griffith (28 March 1891 – 15 March 1978) served as Lord Mayor of Birmingham, England, for the year 1953–4.

Griffith was born on 28 March 1891, in Leytonstone, Essex. His father was George Wilson Griffith. He married Gladys Winifred Jones in West Bromwich, Staffordshire, on 25 September 1915, when he was 24 years old. They had three children: George Wilson, Philip Richard, and Mary. Griffith served as Lord Mayor of Birmingham for the year 1953–4. He died in Birmingham on 15 March 1978.
