= Theodore Pritchett =

Sir Theodore Beal Pritchett MC DL (1890 – 1969), was Lord Mayor of Birmingham and a Deputy Lieutenant of Warwickshire.

He was educated at Bromsgrove School and served in the Royal Artillery during World War I, being awarded the Military Cross.

He was a Councillor on Birmingham City Council from 1924 to 1939, before being appointed an Alderman. He was Lord Mayor of Birmingham for 1939–40.

A Deputy Lieutenant for Warwickshire, he was knighted in the 1953 Coronation Honours List and was awarded the Freedom of the City of Birmingham on 7 May 1960.

He was club president of Aston Villa when Doug Ellis was first appointed chairman of the club in 1968.
