= History of Snow Hill =

Mural in Birmingham, UK

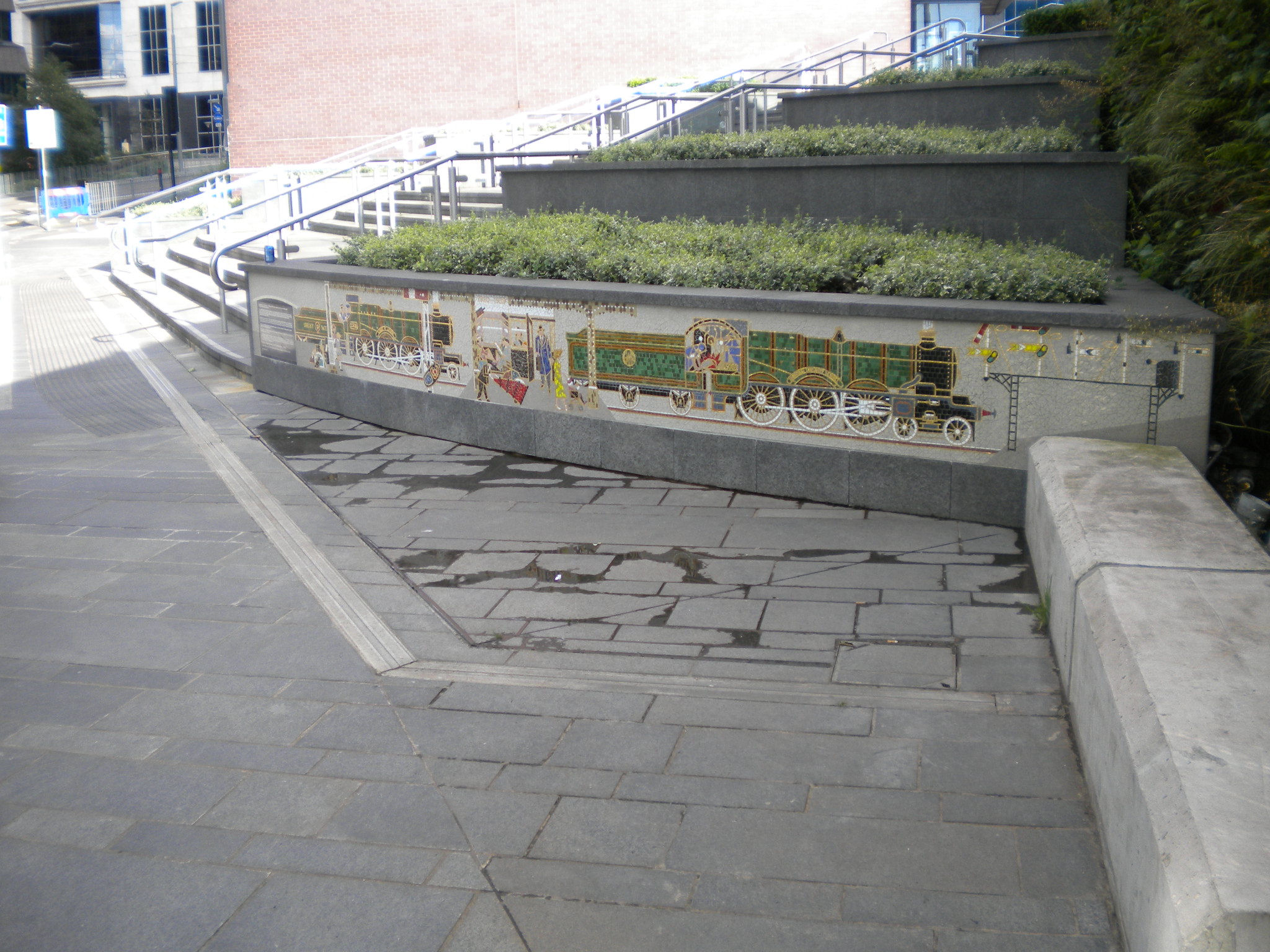
Part of History of Snow Hill (miniature version) by Oliver Budd

History of Snow Hill is a mural in Birmingham, England about Birmingham Snow Hill station.

The original mural was set up in St Chad's Queensway, Birmingham by Kenneth Budd and associates to celebrate the history of Snow Hill station, which was closed in 1972. The mural was destroyed in 2007. In 2013, Kenneth Budd's son Oliver Budd remade the mural in miniature, in Colmore Circus, near the top of Colmore Row. Snow Hill station was revived in the mid-1980s, with a new rebuilt station opening in 1987. The mural contains two plaques which give the history of the Great Western Railway between London Paddington and Snow Hill station, as well as the history of the murals themselves.

== First plaque ==
The first plaque shows A History of the Great Western Railway. Construction of the Great Western Railway line to Snow Hill began in 1847. Isambard Kingdom Brunel was the engineer in charge and the contractors were called Peto and Betts. By 1852 the 129 mile track from Paddington to Birmingham was complete - 7'0" broad gauge to Oxford 4'8½" gauge from there to Birmingham with a third rail provided for the 7'0" track. Standard gauge became standard for the whole country in 1892. Signals were hand operated by railway police.

The first Snow Hill station was open on 1 October 1852. A special "Eve of Opening" train left London Paddington pulled by Daniel Gooch's "Lord of the Isles" which had been on show at The Great Exhibition. This was derailed at Aynho but successfully completed the journey the following day after a change of engine. Nine years later narrow gauge was extended to London Paddington providing a 3-hour 20 minute express service. Unheated carriages were lit by oil pot lamps and bar and disc signals were operated from trackside capstans.

In 1871 a new station was built to accommodate the great increase in traffic. Expresses like No 162 Cobham designed by William Dean and driven by Driver Hughes travelled direct from Paddington at average speeds of 52.7 mph the maximum being 62.75 mph. Carriages were of the clerestory type. Toilets were introduced in 1873. A familiar sight at the turn of the century was Dash the station dog, his collection box strapped to his back. Signals were operated by Worcester levers at track level but by 1900 signal boxes became standard on main lines.

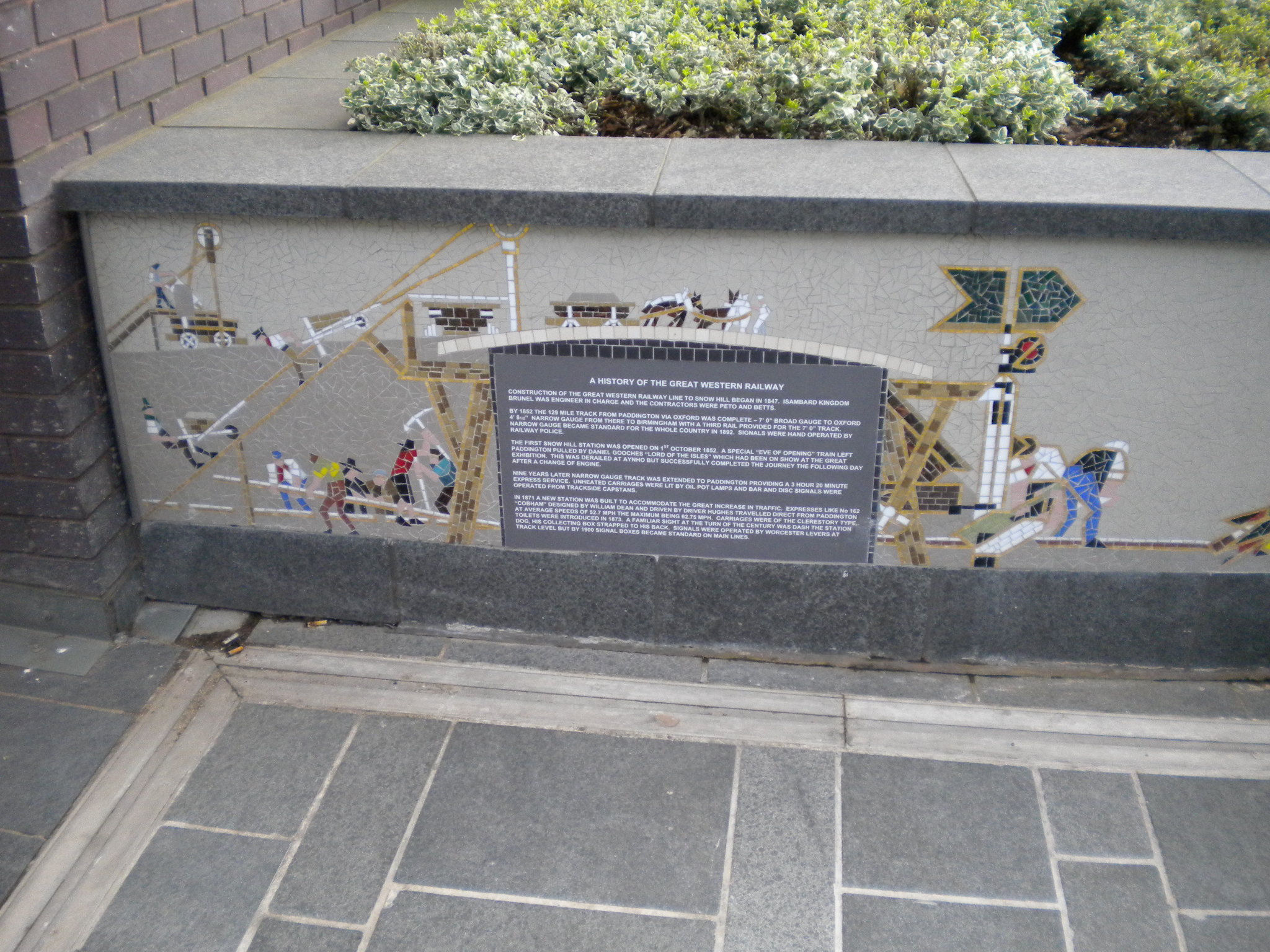

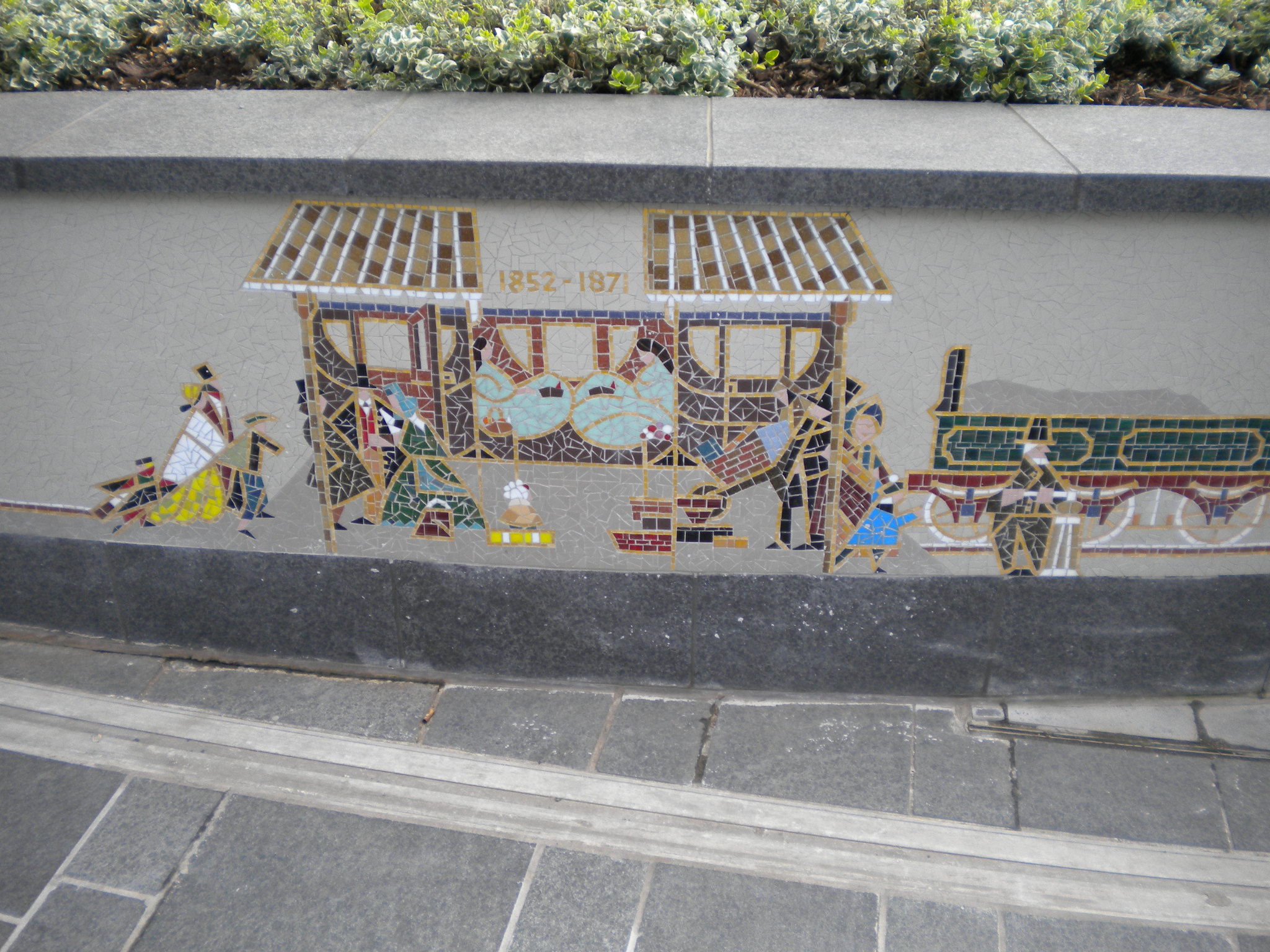

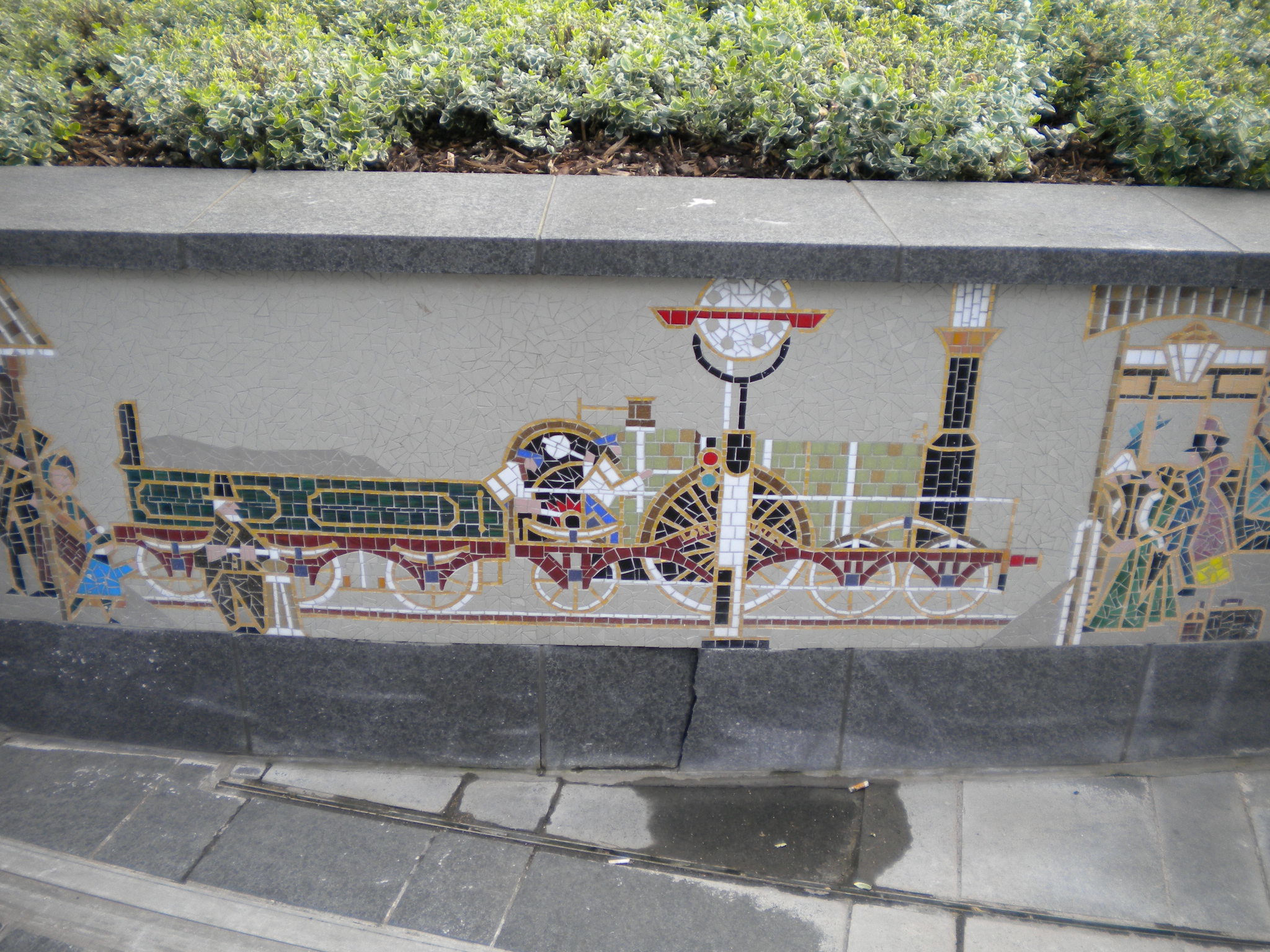

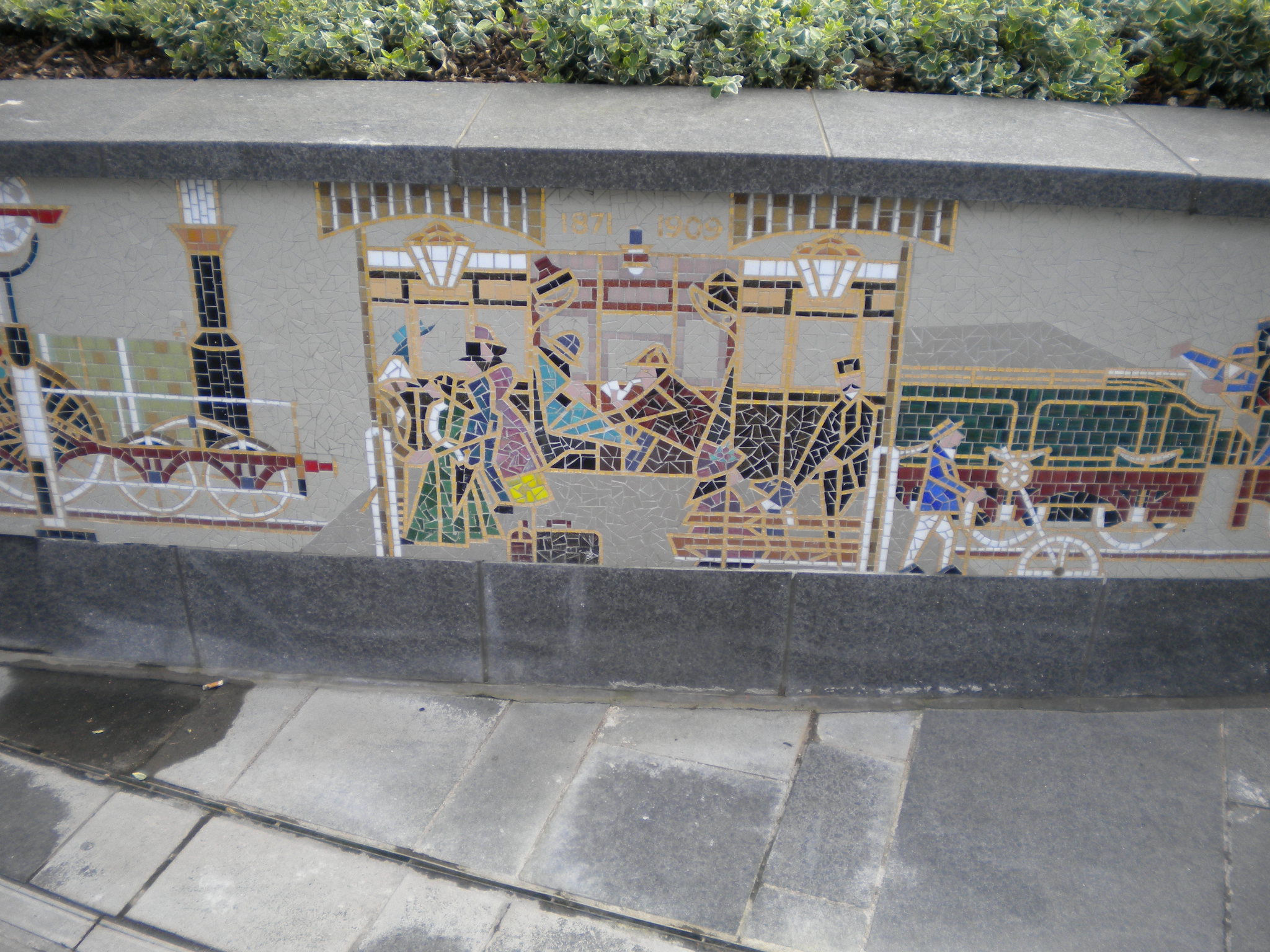

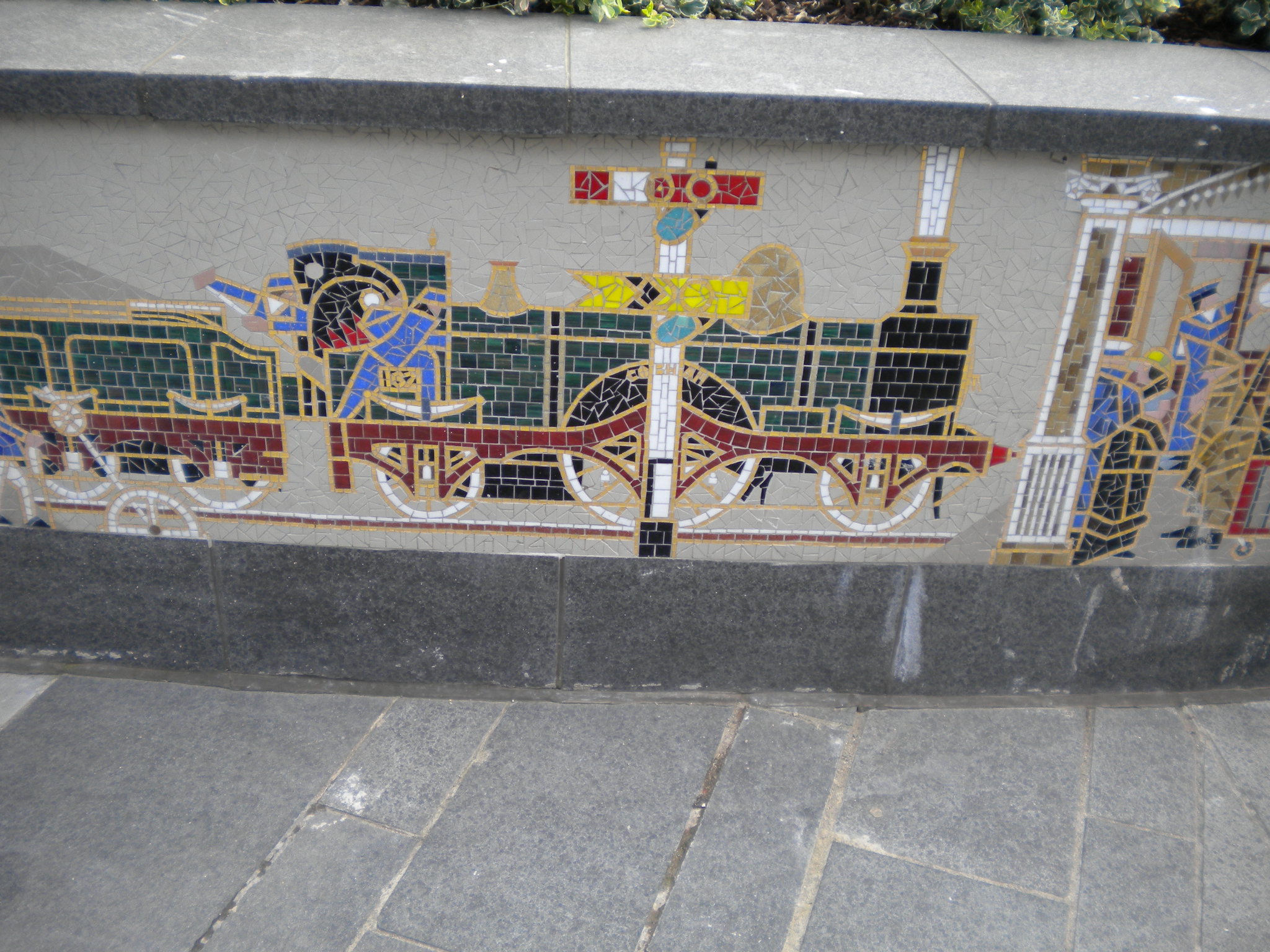

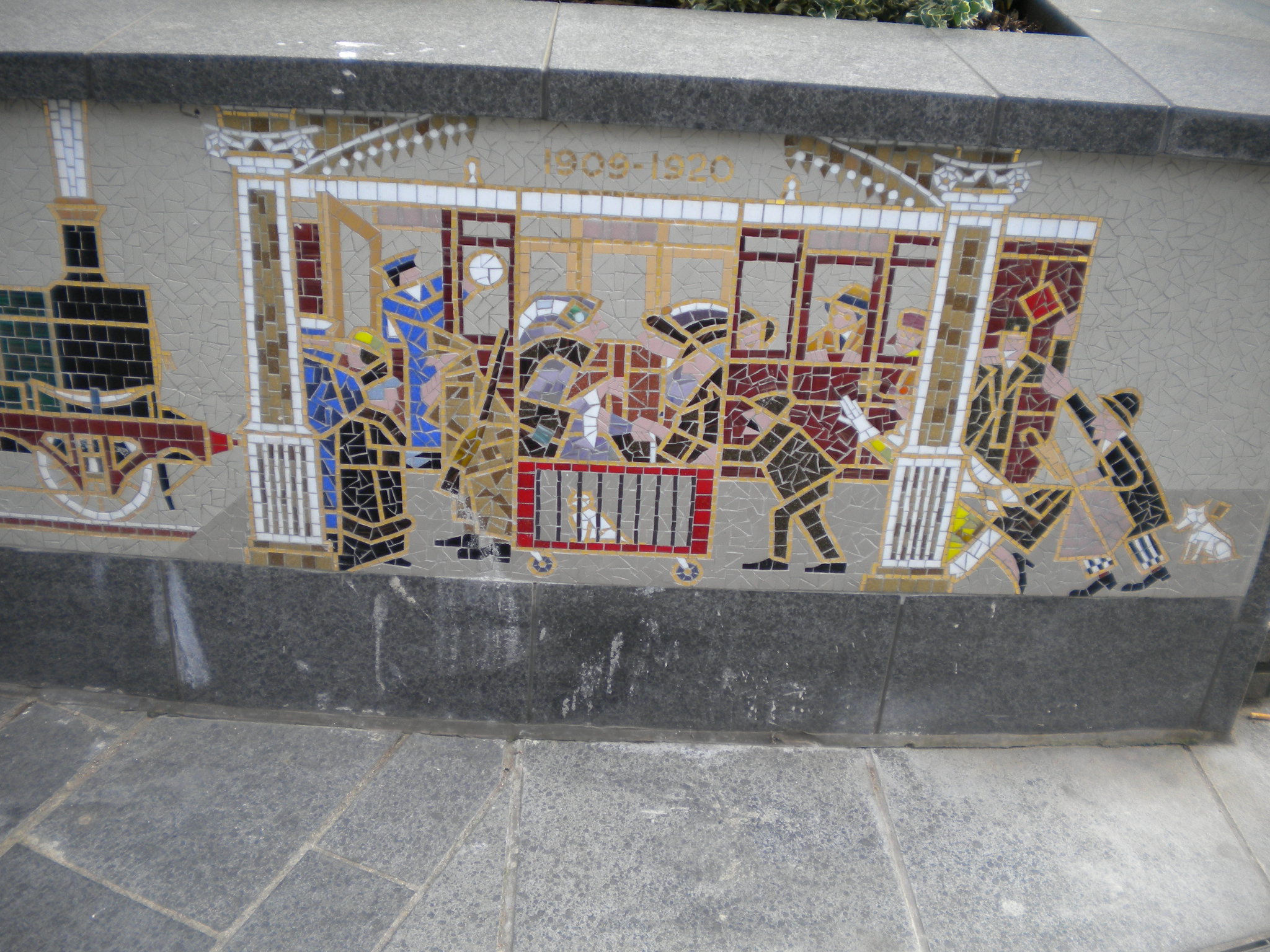

== Second plaque ==
Between 1909 and 1914 the "old" station was replaced by Snow Hill in its final form without interruption to regular services.

George Jackson Churchward succeeded William Dean as Chief Engineer and by 1912 his locomotives like No 2906 Lady of Lynn and the Saint and Star class were providing a regular 2 hour express service from Paddington. Carriages were painted maroon but later reverted to the familiar GWR chocolate and cream livery. Larger and more powerful Castle and King class locomotives were introduced by Charles Collett during the 1920s and 1930s. When World War II came in 1939 Great Westerns familiar livery was replaced by austerity grey and in 1948 the GWR merged its identity into British Railways. Snow Hill continued as part of Western Region until 1967 when it ceased operation as a main line station, although a restricted local service to Wolverhampton lingered on until 1972

The mosaic you see here is a miniature of the original work that once dominated St Chad's Circus by Kenneth Budd and associates. The original was 300 ft long with varying heights to a maximum of 20 ft at the works centre, It took three years to create and was installed in 1969. The locomotives were 2:3 scale and the carriages were 1:1. The work was made in gold leaf and glass mosaic manufactured by Orsoni in Venice set around with a light and dark stone aggregate.

The original lettering panels were carved by stonemason Michael Seymour. The new work by Kenneth's son Oliver Budd is a faithful facsimile of the original design.

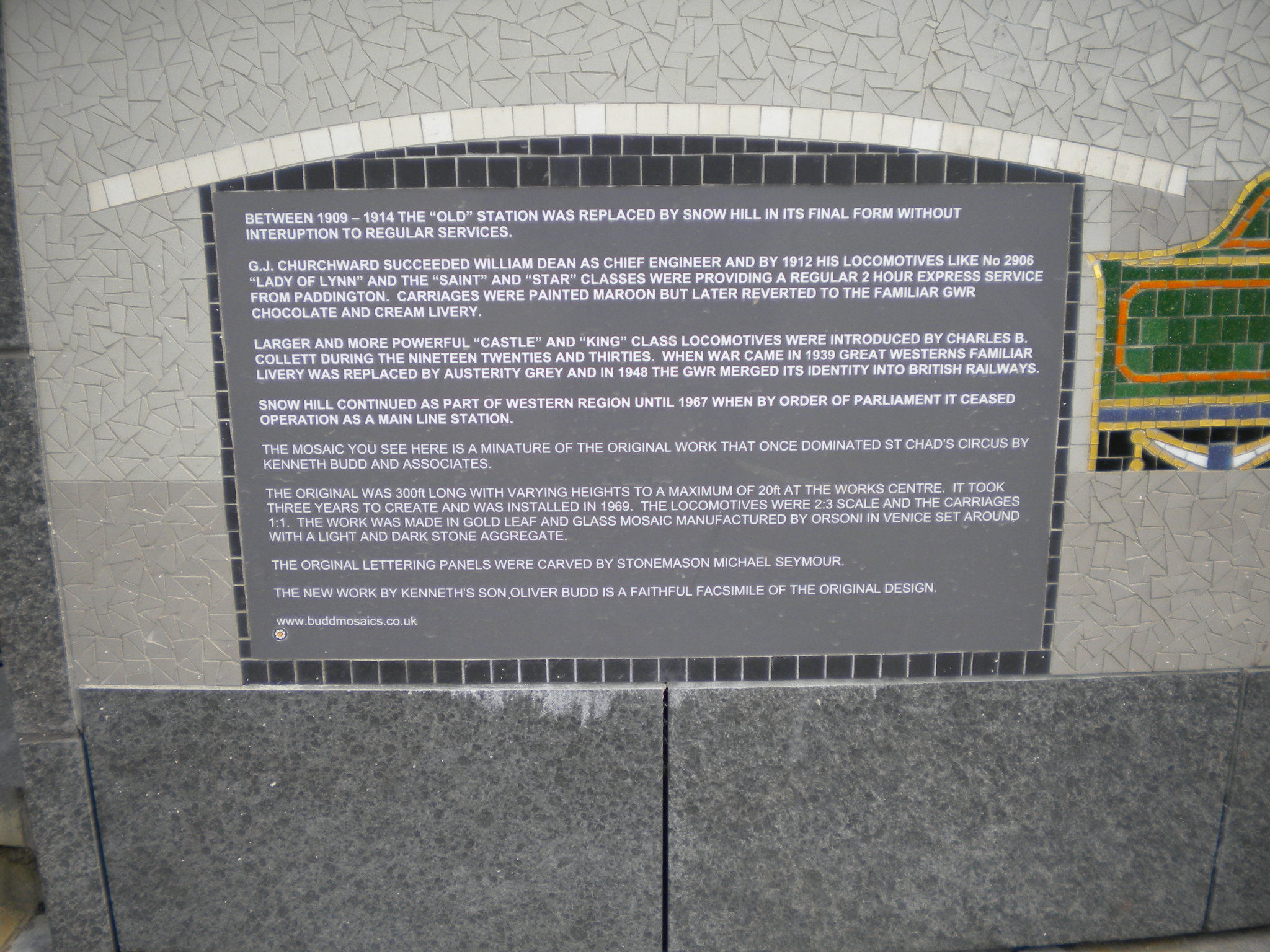

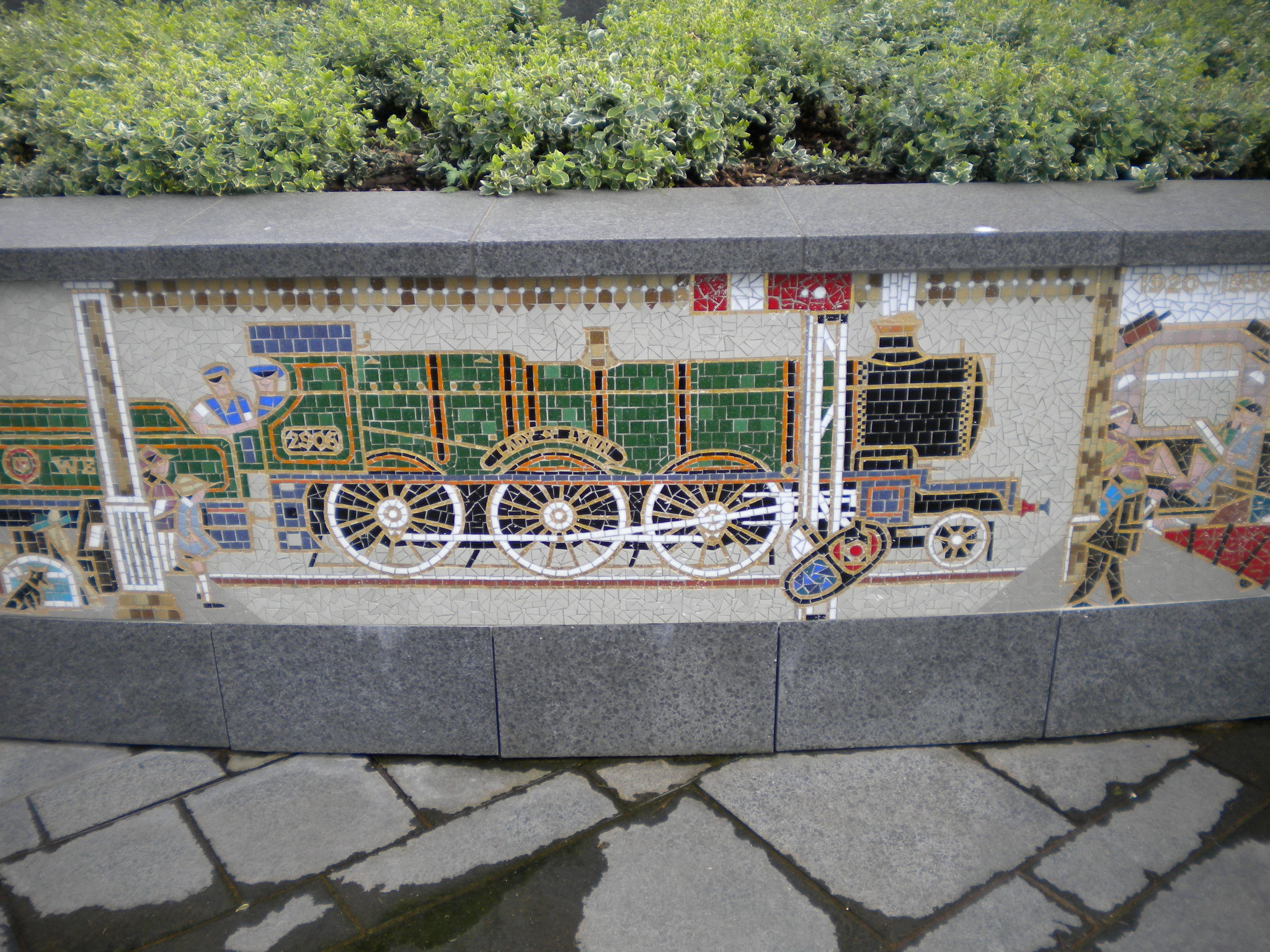

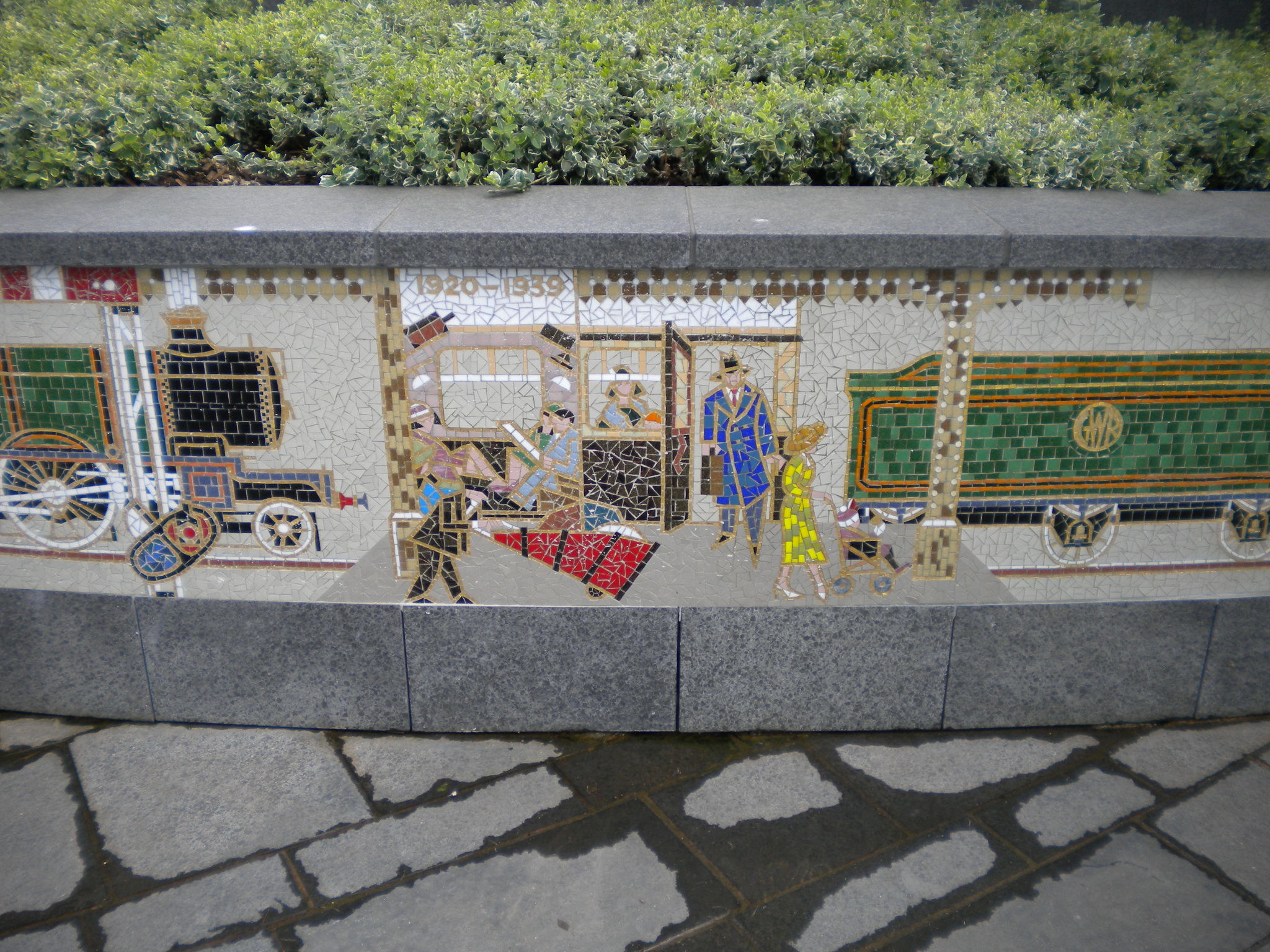

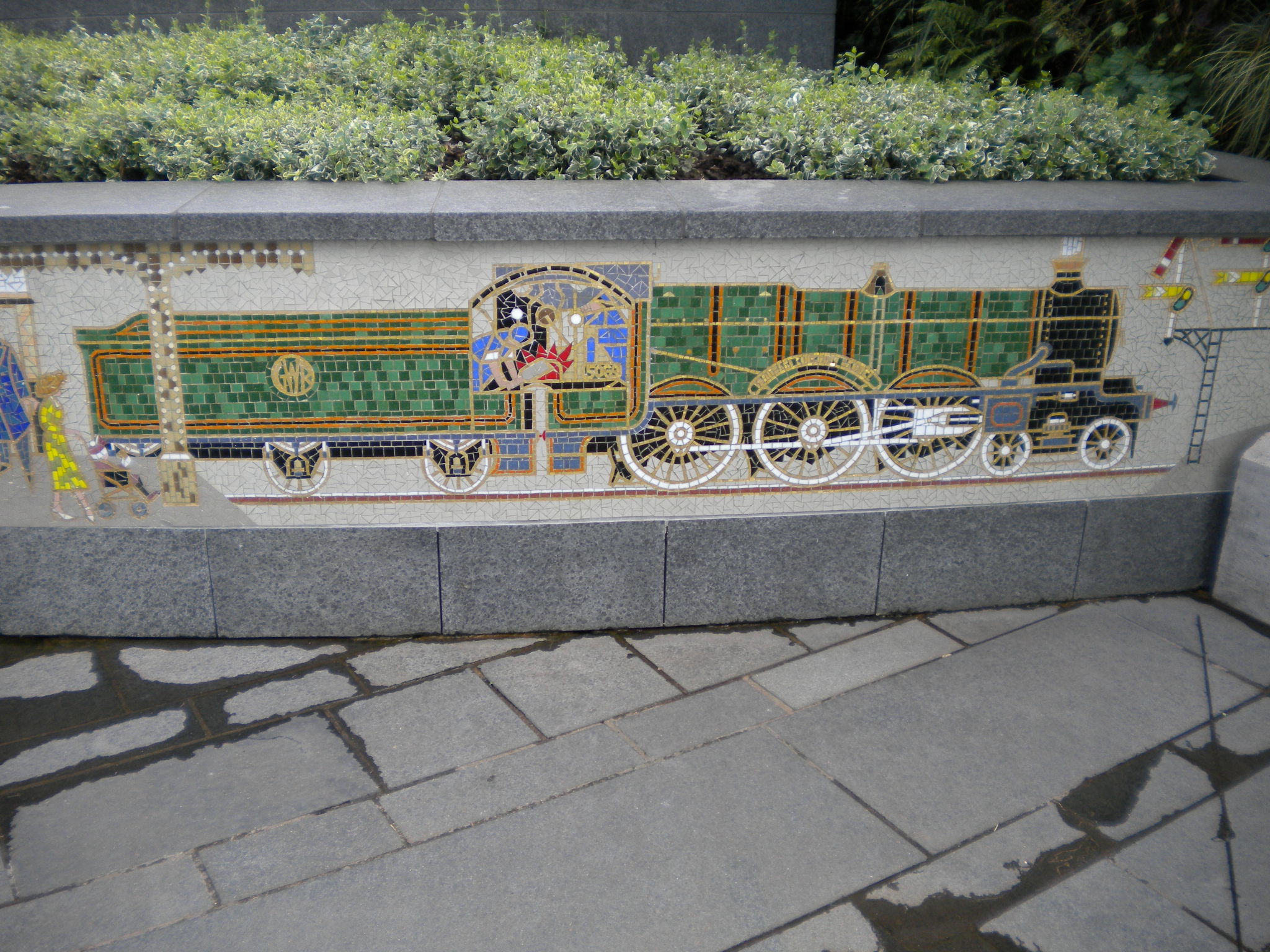

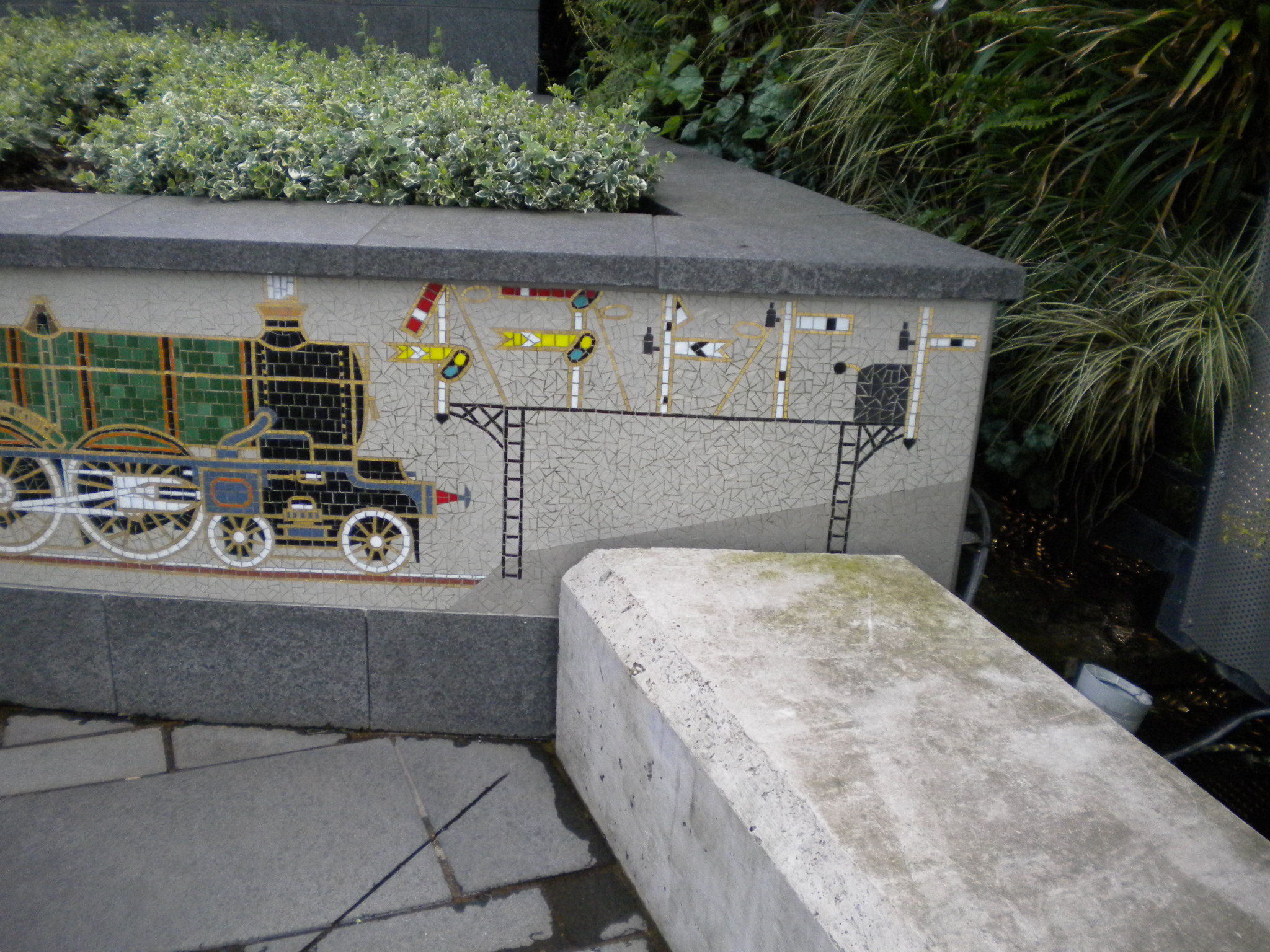

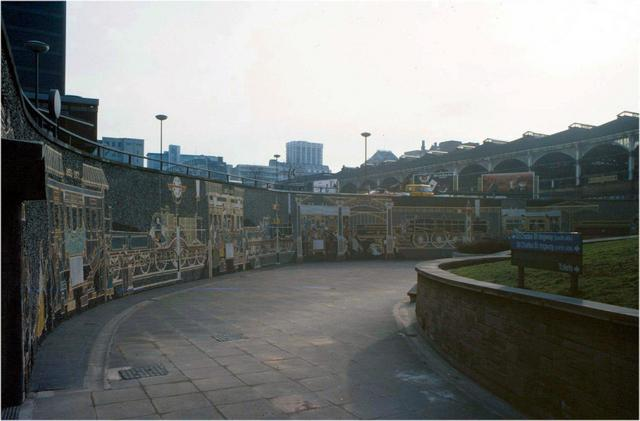
Original mural

== Original mural ==
The original mural was in St Chad's Circus. A description of it is given above, in the second plaque.

It was destroyed when the area was redeveloped.

== See also ==
- List of public art in Birmingham
