= Three acres and a cow =

Distributist slogan

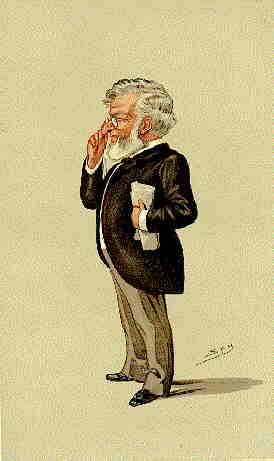
Jesse Collings was caricatured in Vanity Fair as a result of his slogan "Three acres and a cow".

"Three acres and a cow" was a slogan used by the liberal radical British land reform campaigners of the 1880s, and revived by the distributists of the 1920s. It refers to an ideal land holding for every citizen.

The phrase was invented by Eli Hamshire in letters written to Joseph Chamberlain and Jesse Collings during the early 1880s. Hamshire, called the "rustic sage" of Ewhurst, Surrey, did, in fact, own 3 acres (1.2 hectares). Collings used the phrase as a slogan for his 1885 land reform campaign, and it became used as part of the political struggle against rural poverty. Collings specifically believed that ownership of the land was necessary for a fairer distribution of wealth, rather than tenancy. He and his fellow liberal radicals hoped that land ownership would result in a measure of personal independence for the new owners.

Collings became derisively known as "Three Acres and a Cow Collings." His advocacy for smallholdings in January 1886 was one factor in Lord Salisbury's government falling. Later, he would be satirized in John Bull's Adventures in the Fiscal Wonderland as a White Rabbit character who was fixated on the idea of three acres and a cow, as well as blindly loyal to Chamberlain.

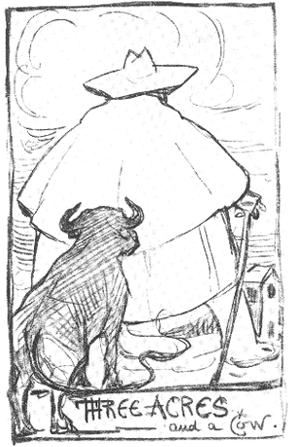
Self-portrait of G. K. Chesterton based on the distributist slogan "Three acres and a cow"

Chamberlain used the slogan for his own "Radical Programme": he urged the purchase by local authorities of land to provide garden and field allotments for all labourers who might desire them, to be let at fair rents in plots of up to 1 acre (0.40 ha) of arable land and up to 4 acres (1.6 ha) of pasture. This appeared in the context of the back-to-the-land movement at the end of the 19th century, when Victorian-era factory workers pushed for economic policies that would allow them to return to life in the countryside.

In What's Wrong With the World, G. K. Chesterton used the phrase to summarise his own distributist opinions. He also used the phrase in The Man Who Knew Too Much. However, he did not believe that this was a full explanation of a distributist economy, because he believed that differing projects would require different sizes of businesses and that industrial projects would continue to exist in addition to agrarian ones.

The phrase was also used to describe pro-worker, decentralized views promoted by Dorothy Day.

== See also ==
- "Forty acres and a mule", referring to a promised reallocation of land to formerly enslaved peoples following the American Civil War
- Small Holdings Act 1892, a little-used option to finance the purchase of small farms
