= David Brooks (lord mayor) =

English politician, Lord Mayor of Birmingham 1917–1919 (1864–1930)

Sir David Brooks GBE

Lord Mayor of Birmingham
- In office 1917–1920

Personal details
- Born: Arthur David Brooks; 6 March 1864
- Died: 7 April 1930 (aged 66)

Sir Arthur David Brooks (6 March 1864 – 7 April 1930) was Lord Mayor of Birmingham in 1917, 1918, and 1919.

A solicitor, he was elected to the Birmingham City Council in 1901 as a Conservative and was elected an alderman in 1911. In 1917, he was elected Lord Mayor in succession to Neville Chamberlain, who had been appointed Director of National Service. He was appointed a Knight Grand Cross of the Order of the British Empire in 1918 "For services in connection with the War".
