= Ray Hassall =

British politician

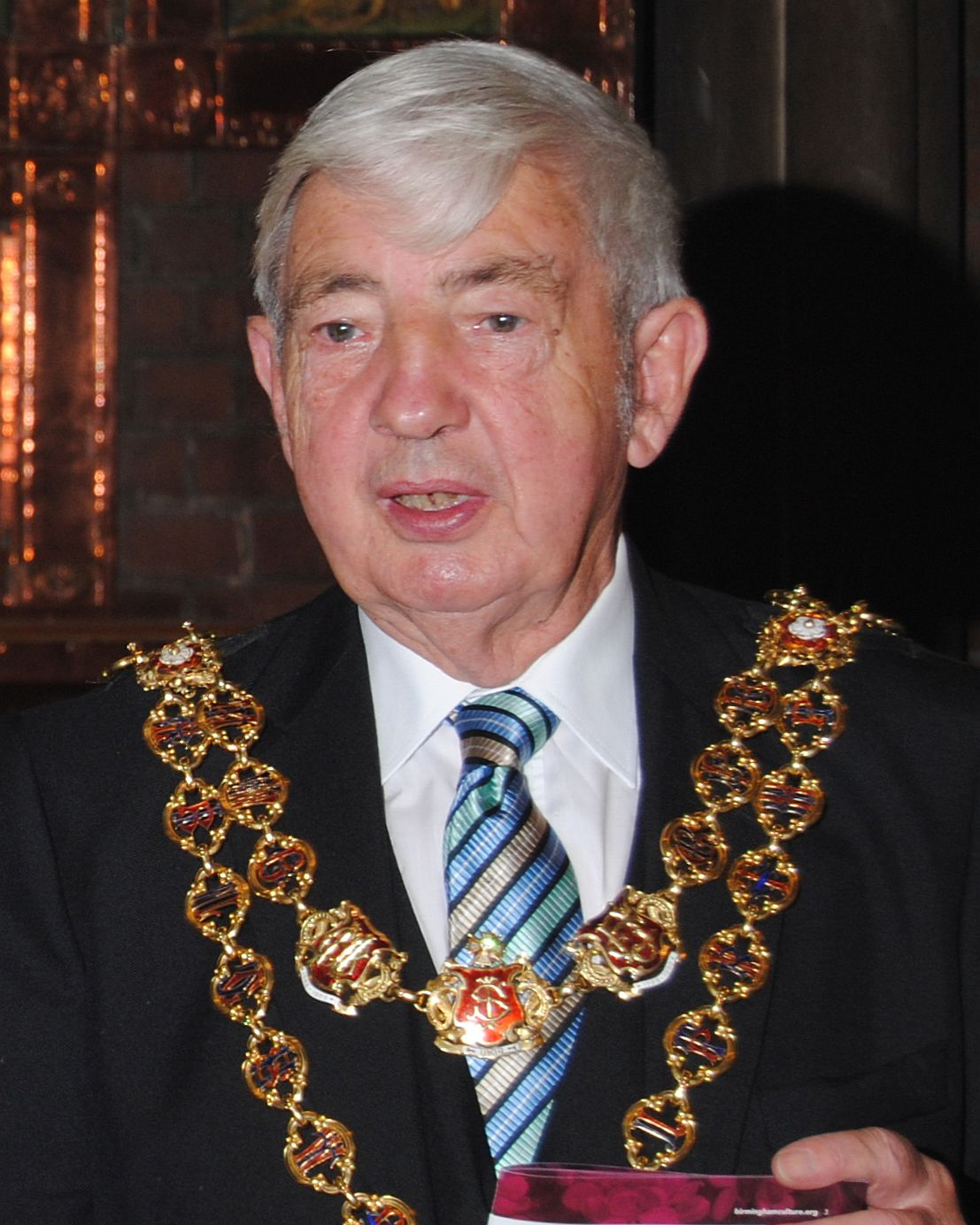

106th Lord Mayor of Birmingham
- In office May 2015 – May 2016
- Preceded by: Shafique Shah
- Succeeded by: Carl Rice

Member of Birmingham City Council for Perry Barr
- In office 3 May 1990 – 12 March 2017
- Succeeded by: Morriam Jan

Deputy Lord Mayor of Birmingham
- In office May 2016 – 12 March 2017
- Preceded by: Shafique Shah
- Succeeded by: Paul Tilsley

Personal details
- Born: Raymond Geoffrey Hassall; 1943 West Bromwich, Staffordshire, England
- Died: 12 March 2017 (aged 74) Erdington, Birmingham, England
- Party: Liberal Democrats

Raymond Geoffrey Hassall (1943 – 12 March 2017), was a British politician

Hassall served in local government in Birmingham, England representing Perry Barr ward for the Liberal Democrats party, and being Birmingham City Council's cabinet member for leisure, sport and culture from 2006 to 2009, and as Lord Mayor of the city in the year May 2015 to May 2016.

== Early life ==
Hassall was born at Hallam Hospital in West Bromwich in 1943, before his family moved to nearby Great Barr. In 1957, they moved to Canada. He returned three years later and joined the British Army's Royal Corps of Signals, from which he was demobbed in 1966. He subsequently worked for the GPO, latterly BT, from where he retired in 1991.

== Political career ==
He was first elected to Perry Barr ward on 3 May 1990. He was also a trustee of Birmingham Civic Society until 2016, serving as its President during his term of office as Lord Mayor of Birmingham.

Notably, Hassall served as Lord Mayor of the city of Birmingham in the year May 2015 to May 2016.

== Death ==
He died unexpectedly, on 12 March 2017, age 74, at his home in the city's Erdington district, while serving as Deputy Lord Mayor of Birmingham. He was divorced, and his son predeceased him aged 40.

His funeral was held on 12 May 2017, at St Peter and St Paul, Aston, followed by a memorial event and wake at Alexander Stadium. A separate civic memorial service was held at Birmingham Cathedral on 15 May.
