= William Kenrick (Birmingham MP) =

British politician (1831–1919)

The Right Honourable William Kenrick MP

Member of Parliament for Birmingham North
- In office 1885–1899

Privy Councillor
- Incumbent
- Assumed office 1899

Personal details
- Born: 8 June 1831 West Bromwich, Staffordshire, England
- Died: 31 July 1919 (aged 88) Harborne, Birmingham, England
- Party: Liberal; Liberal Unionist
- Children: Cecily, Millicent Mary, Wifred Byng, Gerald William
- Occupation: Hardware manufacturer, Member of Parliament

William Kenrick PC (8 June 1831 – 31 July 1919) was an English iron founder and hardware manufacturer. He was a Liberal Unionist Party politician who was active in local government in Birmingham and sat in the House of Commons from 1885 to 1899.

== Life ==
Kenrick was born at West Bromwich, Staffordshire, the son of Archibald Kenrick, JP (1798–1878), an iron founder, and his wife, Anne Paget (1798–1864). He became a director of the family firm, Archibald Kenrick & Sons.

He also became active in local politics, becoming a town councillor in 1870, alderman in 1872 and mayor of Birmingham from 1877 to 1878. In the 1885 general election he became MP for Birmingham North. He held the seat until he resigned in 1899 when he became a Privy Councillor. In 1911 he was given Honorary Freedom of the City of Birmingham.

Kenrick had educational and artistic interests. He was a Governor of King Edward's School, Birmingham and was closely connected with the Arts and Crafts movement. He was Chairman of the Museum and School of Arts Committee and was visited by William Morris in 1880. In 1895 he became a director of the Birmingham Guild of Handicraft when it became a limited company.

Kenrick died at his home, The Grove, Park Lane, Harborne, Warwickshire. The panelling of a room of his house is in the Victoria and Albert Museum in London.

== Marriage and family connections ==
On 26 August 1862, Kenrick married Mary Chamberlain, Joseph's sister, at the Union Chapel, Islington. His sister Harriet had married Joseph Chamberlain in July 1861; they were the parents of statesman Austen Chamberlain. After Harriet's death in 1863, Chamberlain married Harriet and William's cousin, Florence Kenrick, in 1868. Joseph and Florence were the parents of Prime Minister Neville Chamberlain.

=== Children ===
- Cicely Kenrick (1869–1950), married Ernest Debenham on 8 November 1892.
- Millicent Mary Kenrick (1871–1932), married Claude Gerald Napier-Clavering on 30 July 1897; mother of the actor Alan Napier
- Wilfred Byng Kenrick (1872–1962), married his cousin, Norah Beale, on 24 July 1906; later Lord Mayor of Birmingham
- Gerald William Kenrick (1876–1953), married his cousin, Ruth Chamberlain, on 26 April 1912

Parliament of the United Kingdom
New constituency see Birmingham	Member of Parliament for Birmingham North; 1885–1899	Succeeded by John Middlemore
Party political offices
Preceded by William Harris	Chairman of the National Liberal Federation; 1882–1886	Succeeded by Walter Foster
