= Honorary Freedom of Boroughs Act 1885 =

Act of the Parliament of the United Kingdom

Honorary Freedom of Boroughs Act 1885 (Note: Section 3.)
- Act of Parliament
- Parliament of the United Kingdom
- Long title: An Act to enable municipal corporations to confer the honorary freedom of boroughs upon persons of distinction.
- Citation: 48 & 49 Vict. c. 29
- Introduced by: Marquess of Ripon
- Territorial extent: United Kingdom

Dates
- Royal assent: 22 July 1885
- Commencement: 22 July 1885 (Note: The Acts of Parliament (Commencement) Act 1793.)
- Repealed: 1 June 1934
Other legislation
Repealed by	Local Government Act 1933

Status: Repealed

Text of statute as originally enacted

The Honorary Freedom of Boroughs Act 1885 (48 & 49 Vict. c.29) was an act of the Parliament of the United Kingdom that gave the councils of municipal boroughs in England and Wales the power to award the title of honorary freeman to "persons of distinction and any persons who have rendered eminent services to the borough".

== Background ==
Prior to the reform of town and city government by the Municipal Corporations Act 1835 (5 & 6 Will. 4. c. 76), the rank of "freeman" existed in all boroughs. Freemen enjoyed exemption from tolls and other special privileges, and in most cases were the only persons eligible to vote at parliamentary elections. Depending on the borough's charter of incorporation, freedom could be inherited by sons, daughters or widows, or by apprenticeship to an existing freeman. Corporations also had the right to designate persons otherwise unqualified as freemen, and the purchase of freedom was also widespread.

The Radical authors of the original municipal reform bill had intended to entirely abolish the office of freeman. However, following a bitter parliamentary campaign where opposition came from both Whigs and Tories, those who held the rank of freeman on 5 June 1835, and their heirs and successors, continued to enjoy "the same Share and Benefit of the Lands, Tenements, and Hereditaments, and of the Rents and Profits thereof, and of the Common Lands and Public Stock" of the borough. However, the Act expressly forbid the extension of freedom beyond this group of people, providing that "no Person shall be elected, made, or admitted a Burgess or Freeman of any Borough by Gift or Purchase". The Municipal Corporations Act 1882, which replaced the 1835 legislation, continued to reserve the "rights and interests" of existing freemen, and again banned the admission of persons to the freedom of the borough by purchase or gift.

== Campaign by Kingston-upon-Hull ==
Fifty years after the passing of the 1835 Act, Kingston upon Hull Town Council wished to have the power to grant the honorary freedom of the borough. Accordingly, they made steps to add a clause to a private parliamentary bill for the purpose. The council was supported by the Marquess of Ripon, who held the ceremonial office of High Steward of Kingston upon Hull. When he attempted to promote the clause in the House of Lords, this was opposed by Lord Redesdale, Chairman of Committees, who felt that the measure should be extended to all boroughs. Accordingly, a private member's bill was piloted through the Lords by the Marquess of Ripon, and through the Commons by Charles Norwood, one of Kingston upon Hull's MPs.

== The act ==
The act was a short one, consisting of only three sections. Section 1 provided that:

..the council of every borough may from time to time, by the authority of not less than two-thirds of their number present and voting at a meeting of the council specially called for the purpose with notice of the object, admit to be honorary freeman of the borough persons of distinction and any persons who have rendered eminent services to the borough...

The act further explained that the honorary freedom did not give the recipient the right to vote in parliamentary or other elections for the borough, or to enjoy any of the rights and interests of existing freemen.

The act received royal assent on 22 July 1885, and Kingston-upon-Hull Town Council moved quickly to use the new legislation to honour their High Steward. At a special meeting of the council held on 29 July, the Marquess of Ripon became the first honorary freeman of Hull, and the first recipient of the honour under the 1885 act.

== Subsequent developments ==
The whole act was repealed by section 307(1)(b) of, and the fourth part of the eleventh schedule to, the Local Government Act 1933 (23 & 24 Geo. 5. c. 51), which came into force on 1 June 1934. The 1933 act repealed and consolidated all local government legislation in England and Wales.

Section 259 of the 1933 act continued the powers of borough corporations to appoint honorary freemen. The 1933 act was itself repealed by the Local Government Act 1972, and awards of honorary freedom are now made under that legislation as amended by the Local Democracy, Economic Development and Construction Act 2009.

== See also ==
- Honorary Freedom of the City of Birmingham
- List of Freemen of the City of Liverpool
- List of Freemen of the City of Wolverhampton (formerly Borough)
