= John Middlemore =

British politician

Sir John Throgmorton Middlemore, 1st Baronet (9 June 1844 – 17 October 1924) was an English Liberal Unionist politician who served as Member of Parliament (MP) for Birmingham North.

He was the son of William Middlemore, who had a leather business at Holloway Head, Birmingham. He gained a degree in medicine.

He was elected to the House of Commons at a by-election in 1899 following the resignation of the sitting Birmingham North MP, William Kenrick. Middlemore held the seat until the constituency was abolished at the 1918 General Election, and did not stand for election again.

He served as a J.P. for Birmingham and Worcestershire. In 1872 he founded and managed for forty years the Middlemore Children's Emigration Homes for the training of destitute children in Agriculture in Canada. Between 1873 and 1952, some 6000 children suffering from neglect or poverty were sent via the city's Middlemore Emigration Home to work in Australia and Canada. The children were taken overseas in large groups and then distributed to families when they arrived.

He was made a Baronet on 27 May 1919, of Selly Oak, Worcestershire. On his death he was succeeded by his son William Hawkslow Middlemore, on whose death the title became extinct.

The Sir John Middlemore Charitable Trust managed and operated the Middlemore Family Centre in Bartley Green, Birmingham until July 2012. They now provide grants to organisations based in and working in the West Midlands who support those under the age of twenty-five (under 25s) who are "experiencing disadvantage".

Parliament of the United Kingdom
Preceded by William Kenrick	Member of Parliament for Birmingham North; 1899–1918	Constituency abolished
Baronetage of the United Kingdom
New creation	Baronet (of Selly Oak); 1919–1924	Succeeded by William Hawkslow Middlemore
