= Bernard Zissman =

British businessman, politician and author

Sir Bernard Zissman (born 1933/1934) is a British businessperson, politician and author.

== Background ==
Zissman was born into a family which ran a menswear firm that was established by Zissman's grandfather. Zissman attended King Edward VI Five Ways School in Birmingham.

== Career ==
Before entering politics, Zissman worked for his family's menwear company.

Zissman served as a local councillor in Birmingham for over 30 years. Zissman first became a local councillor in Birmingham when he was elected councillor for the Rotton Park ward in 1965; he was later a councillor for Harborne ward, but lost his Harborne sat in the 1995 Local Elections. As of 1976, he held responsibility for children's services within the council. As of 1983, Zissman was chair of Birmingham's General Purposes Committee. As of 1994, Zissman was the leader of the Conservative group on Birmingham City Council.

Zissman chaired the Birmingham City Council committee responsible for the building of the International Convention Centre, which was opened in 1991.

In 1990, Zissman was the Lord Mayor of Birmingham.

As of 2003, Zissman was the chair of Good Hope Hospital NHS Trust in Sutton Coldfield.

In 2002, he published A Knight Out with Chamberlain in Birmingham, a book in which he explored the activities of Joseph Chamberlain and Zissman himself in terms of urban development in Birmingham.

In 2008, a book by Zissman about the founder of the state Israel Theodor Herzl was published; in 2012, Zissman announced that he wished to produce a film adaptation of the book. In 2024, it was announced that David Baddiel would narrate the film. In 2025, the film was launched by Zissman at BAFTA.

In 2011, Zissman was appointed chairman of Rewind PR. Zissman currently serves as the chairperson of several companies. He has also held positions at a number of charitable organisations.

== Honours ==
Zissman was awarded a knighthood in 1996. He received an honorary degree from the University of Birmingham in 1997. He is also an honorary graduate of Birmingham City University.

== Personal life ==
Zissman married Cynthia Glass in 1958.
