= Wilfred Byng Kenrick =

English industrialist (1872–1962)

Alderman Wilfred Byng Kenrick
- Born: 4 December 1872; Birmingham, England
- Died: 7 August 1962 (aged 89); Birmingham
- Education: Rugby School; Balliol College, Oxford
- Occupations: Industrialist; Politician; Educationalist
- Known for: Lord Mayor of Birmingham
- Parent: William Kenrick Mary Chamberlain

Alderman Wilfred Byng Kenrick (4 December 1872 – 7 August 1962) was an English industrialist, politician and educationalist, who served as Lord Mayor of Birmingham.

== Family ==
Kenrick was born on 4 December 1872. He was the son of another Birmingham civic leader, William Kenrick and, through his mother Mary Chamberlain, was a nephew of a third, her younger brother Joseph Chamberlain, as well as being a cousin to Austen and Neville Chamberlain.

He was educated at Rugby School and Balliol College, Oxford.

Kenrick married another cousin, Norah Beale, on 24 July 1906. She was the daughter of Alderman Charles Gabriel Beale and his wife, Alice Kenrick. The couple had four children, first a daughter, Norah Penelope (1907–1932), and then three sons, William Edmund (1908–1981), John Byng (1911–2002) and Hugh Kenrick (1913–2001). In 1908, the family were resident at Metchley House in Edgbaston. One of Wilfred's sisters, Cicely (1869–1950), married Ernest Debenham, head of the retail chain Debenhams, in 1892. Wilfred had another sister, Millicent Mary Kenrick (1871–1932), the mother of the actor Alan Napier, and a younger brother, Gerald William Kenrick (1876–1953).

Byng Kenrick was involved in managing the family firm, Archibald Kenrick & Sons Ltd, whose origins date back to 1791, from whose day-to-day activities he stood down in 1945, retiring fully in 1953.

== Civic service ==
Kenrick was first elected to Birmingham City Council in 1914. For many years, he led the council's Unionist group. He served as chair of Birmingham's Education Committee from 1922 to 1928, and was Lord Mayor for the year 1928–1929 (his father had been Mayor in 1877, before Birmingham became a city; his father-in-law was Lord Mayor from 1897 to 1899 and again in 1905), before returning to the Education Committee from 1931 to 1943, and was a governor and deputy pro-chancellor of the University of Birmingham from 1939 to 1957. He was, like his father before him, a governor of King Edward's School there from 1916 until his death.

Kenrick was granted – like his father and father-in-law before him – Honorary Freedom of the City of Birmingham on 11 July 1938. He was awarded the Birmingham Civic Society gold medal in 1948 and an honorary Doctor of law degree (LL.D.) by the University of Birmingham in 1959. He was elected an Alderman of Birmingham.

== Art collection ==
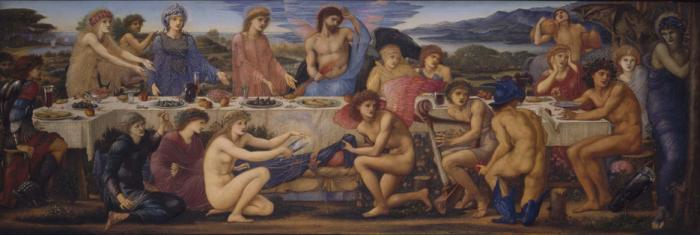
The Feast of Peleus by Edward Burne-Jones, donated by Byng Kenrick to Birmingham Museum and Art Gallery

Kenrick owned significant artworks, some inherited from his father. In 1956, he presented the Edward Burne-Jones painting The Feast of Peleus to Birmingham Museum and Art Gallery, in memory of his father. John Everett Millais' The Ransom, which was part of the inheritance, was sold after Byng's death, and having been resold, is now in the J. Paul Getty Museum.

The Lantern Maker's Courtship, A Street Scene in Cairo by William Holman Hunt was donated by his family, to Birmingham Museum and Art Gallery in 1962, as was Head of a Boy by Joseph Southall in 1964.

== Legacy ==
Kenrick died on 7 August 1962.

The former Byng Kenrick Grammar School For Girls (now part of The International School) was named in his honour. A bronze bust by William Bloye was commissioned anonymously in his honour in 1960 and displayed at the school, from where it was eventually stolen; it has never been recovered. He is commemorated by a blue plaque at Grove Park, on Mill Farm Road, Harborne in Birmingham, outside a care home named The Kenrick Centre, in honour of his wider family.

A pair of flannel tennis trousers believed to have belonged to him is in the collection of Birmingham Museum and Art Gallery.

The silver and enamel casket made by Muriel Meats to house Kenrick's Freedom of the City document was rediscovered in a storeroom at Aston University in 2001. It was subsequently placed in the care of Birmingham Museum and Art Gallery.
