= Michael Wilkes (academic) =

British academic

Francis Michael Wilkes (1941–2015) was a British academic, former Lord Mayor of Birmingham, and former Chancellor of Birmingham City University.

== Background ==
Michael Wilkes was born in Brettell Lane, Amblecote, Stourbridge, in 1941.

Wilkes was educated at St Philip's Grammar School in Birmingham. He graduated from the University of Birmingham with the degrees of BSocSc and PhD.

Wilkes has been an Emeritus Professor of Birmingham University since 2002. He was Professor of business investment and management at Birmingham University from 1991 to 2002. He was formerly lecturer and then senior lecturer at Birmingham University. Wilkes had secondments to Aston University and to Northwestern University in the USA.

He was Chancellor of Birmingham City University from 2009 to 2010. Wilkes was Lord Mayor of Birmingham from 2009 to 2010.

Wilkes was a leading expert on Lord of the Rings, Chairman of the Birmingham Tolkien Group, member of the Tolkien Society and a founding member of Birmingham's Middle Earth Weekend.

He was a vice chair of the Lunar Society.

== Politics ==
He was a Liberal Democrat member of Birmingham City Council from 1984 to 1992 and from 2000 to 2012, when he retired and became an honorary alderman.

He was a member of the Fulbright Scholars' Association.

== Death ==
On 17 April 2015, Wilkes died at St. Mary's Hospice from cancer, age 73.
