= Beale baronets =

Extinct baronetcy in the Baronetage of the United Kingdom

There have been two baronetcies created for persons with the surname of Beale, one in the Baronetage of England and one in the Baronetage of the United Kingdom. Both creations are extinct.

The Beale Baronetcy, of Maidstone in the County of Kent, was created in the Baronetage of England on 16 October 1660 for John Beale of Farningham Court, near Maidstone, Kent. He was the grandson of Thomas Beale, Mayor of Maidstone and served as High Sheriff of Kent in 1665. The title became extinct on his death in 1684.

The Beale Baronetcy, of Drumlamford in the County of Ayr, was created in the Baronetage of the United Kingdom on 3 July 1912 for the lawyer and politician William Beale. The title became extinct on his death in 1922.

== Beale baronets, of Maidstone (1660) ==
Escutcheon of the Beale baronets of Maidstone

- Sir John Beale, 1st Baronet (c. 1621–1684)

His grandfather died in 1593. His grandfather was jurat of Maidstone and Mayor in 1561 and 1574.

== Beale baronets, of Drumlamford (1912) ==
Escutcheon of the Beale baronets of Drumlamford

- Sir William Phipson Beale, 1st Baronet (1839–1922)
