= James S. Meadows =

British politician

Alderman James S. Meadows OBE
- Born: James Stephen Meadows; 22 March 1911; Ladywood, England
- Died: 20 October 1981 (aged 70); Broadstairs, England

Alderman James Stephen Meadows OBE (22 March 1911 – 20 October 1981) was a British politician, who served as a member of Birmingham City Council and was Lord Mayor of Birmingham for the year 1966–1967.

As Lord Mayor, he was also an ex-officio member of the Birmingham Municipal Bank's Committee of Management.

He was made an Officer of the Order of the British Empire "for political and public services in Birmingham" in the 1966 New Year Honours.

Meadows died at his home in Broadstairs on 20 October 1981, aged 70.
