= Hubert Humphreys =

George Hubert Humphreys (14 July 1878 – 4 October 1967) was a British socialist activist.

Humphreys was educated at King Edward's Grammar School in Aston, before becoming a blacksmith, then working as an actor for three years. In 1912, he became the managing director of the Midland Fan Company, holding this position for the remainder of his life.

Humphreys became interested in socialism and in 1917, he joined the Fabian Society. He served on its executive on numerous occasions, and also as director of its summer school. He was also chair of the National Clarion Fellowship.

At the 1935 United Kingdom general election, Humphreys stood unsuccessfully as the Labour Party candidate for Birmingham Ladywood. He was elected to Birmingham City Council in 1937, becoming an alderman in 1945. In 1949/50, he served as Lord Mayor of Birmingham.
