= Marjorie Brown (politician) =

British politician and first woman Lord Mayor of Birmingham

Marjorie Alice Brown CBE (25 May 1919 – 8 January 2015) was Lord Mayor of Birmingham in 1973–74. Brown was the first woman to be Lord Mayor of Birmingham.

== Early life ==
Marjorie Alice Poole was born in 1919, the daughter of William and Beatrice Brown.

== Councillor and Lord Mayor ==
Brown was elected as a Labour councillor to Birmingham City Council in 1954 for Small Heath Ward, remaining a councillor until 1986. She was Lord Mayor in 1973–74.

She was awarded the CBE in 1977.

== Personal life ==
Brown married Marwood Eric Brown in 1940; they had two daughters, Jackie and Carol. She died in 2015, aged 95.
