= Charles Gabriel Beale =

English solicitor, politician and ornithologist

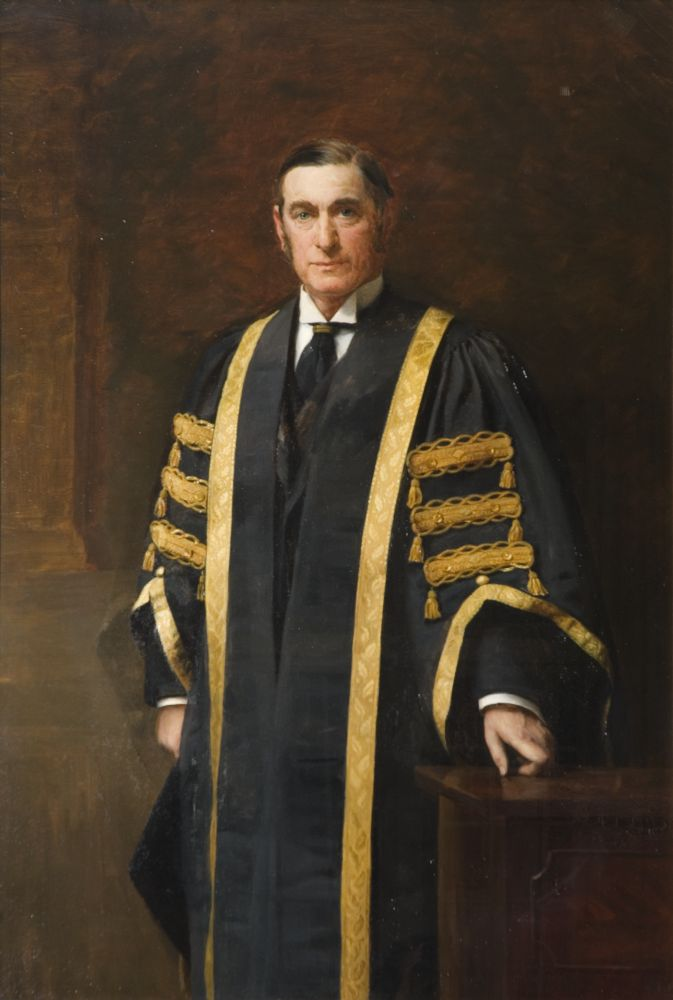
- 1912 oil portrait, in the gowns of the Pro-Chancellor of the University of Birmingham
- Born: 10 May 1843; Edgbaston
- Died: 1 September 1912 (aged 69); Kings Norton
- Occupation: Solicitor
- Known for: Lord Mayor of Birmingham; Pro-Chancellor of the University of Birmingham; Sheriff of Merionethshire

Charles Gabriel Beale JP (10 May 1843 – 1 September 1912), third son of William John Beale, was an English solicitor, politician and ornithologist, and was four times Lord Mayor of Birmingham.

== Biography ==
Beale lived at Maple Bank, Edgbaston, Birmingham and Bryntirion, Dolgelly, Wales. He was a member of Beale and Co. of London and Birmingham, solicitors to the Midland Railway, a director of the London City and Midland Bank, and chairman of the South Staffordshire Waterworks Company. He served as Vice-Chancellor of the University of Birmingham, and as Lord Mayor of Birmingham in 1897, 1898 and 1899, returning to the post in 1905 following the sudden death of the incumbent, Rowland Hill Berkeley. He was Sheriff of Merionethshire in 1907. In 1911 he was appointed a member of the Railway Inquiry Commission. He died on 1 September 1912.

== Family ==
Beale married Alice Kenrick (1845–1940), daughter of Timothy Kenrick and Maria Paget, on 7 August 1868. They had four children, Hubert Kenrick, Edith Mary, Edmund Phipson and Norah who married Wilfred Byng Kenrick. Charles's elder brothers were the Liberal MP, William and James, who commissioned Philip Webb to design Standen, West Sussex, now in the ownership of the National Trust.
