= Birmingham North (UK Parliament constituency) =

Parliamentary constituency in the United Kingdom, 1885–1918

- Former borough constituency for the House of Commons
- Local government in West Midlands: Warwickshire

1885–1918
- Created from: Birmingham
- Replaced by: Birmingham Duddeston (Majority), Birmingham West (Part)

Birmingham North was a parliamentary constituency in the city of Birmingham, England. It returned one Member of Parliament (MP) to the House of Commons of the Parliament of the United Kingdom, elected by the first-past-the-post voting system.

The constituency was created in upon the abolition of the Birmingham constituency in 1885, and was itself abolished for the 1918 general election.

== Boundaries ==
Before 1885 the city of Birmingham, in the county of Warwickshire, had been a three-member constituency (for further details, see Birmingham constituency). Under the Redistribution of Seats Act 1885 the parliamentary borough of Birmingham was split into seven single-member divisions, one of which was Birmingham North. It consisted of the wards of St George's, St Mary's, and St Stephen's.

This division was compact and almost square shaped. It was bounded to the west by Birmingham West, to the north by Handsworth and Aston Manor, to the east by Birmingham East and to the south by Birmingham Central.

In the 1918 redistribution of parliamentary seats, the Representation of the People Act 1918 provided for twelve new Birmingham divisions. The North division was abolished.

== Members of Parliament ==
Year	Member	Party
1885	William Kenrick	Liberal
1886	William Kenrick	Liberal Unionist
1899	John Middlemore	Liberal Unionist
1912	John Middlemore	Unionist
1918	Constituency abolished	

== Elections ==
=== Elections in the 1880s ===
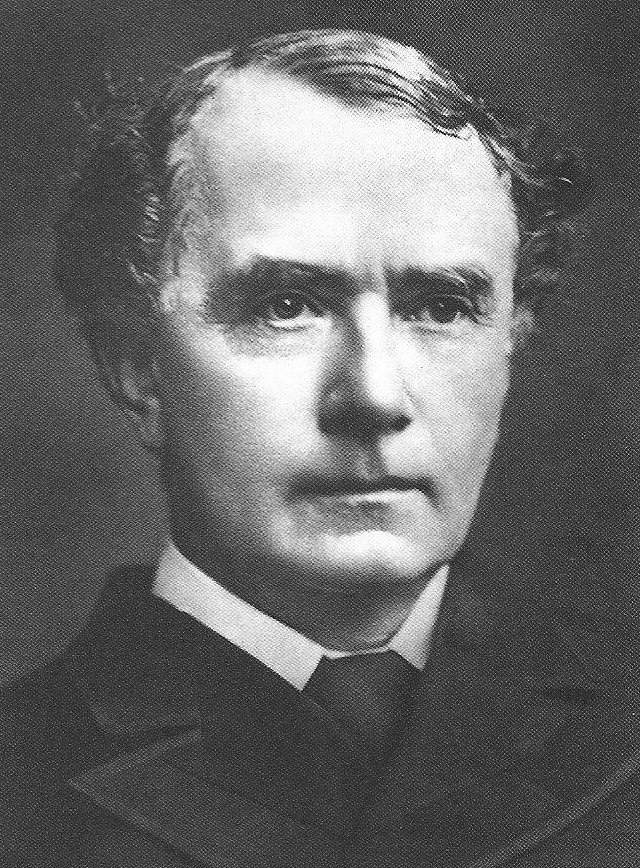
Matthews

General election 1885: Birmingham North
Party	Candidate	Votes	%
Liberal	William Kenrick	4,179	54.0
Conservative	Henry Matthews	3,561	46.0
Majority		618	8.0
Turnout		7,740	82.1
Registered electors		9,427	
Liberal win (new seat)			

Kenrick

General election 1886: Birmingham North
Party	Candidate	Votes	%	±%
Liberal Unionist	William Kenrick	Unopposed		
Liberal Unionist gain from Liberal				

=== Elections in the 1890s ===
General election 1892: Birmingham North
Party	Candidate	Votes	%	±%
Liberal Unionist	William Kenrick	4,814	69.7	N/A
Lib-Lab	Eli Bloor	2,089	30.3	New
Majority		2,725	39.4	N/A
Turnout		6,903	71.8	N/A
Registered electors		9,615		
Liberal Unionist hold		Swing	N/A	

General election 1895: Birmingham North
Party	Candidate	Votes	%	±%
Liberal Unionist	William Kenrick	4,547	78.9	+9.2
Liberal	William James Lancaster	1,213	21.1	−9.2
Majority		3,334	57.8	+18.4
Turnout		5,760	59.1	−12.7
Registered electors		9,753		
Liberal Unionist hold		Swing	+9.2	

1899 Birmingham North by-election
Party	Candidate	Votes	%	±%
Liberal Unionist	John Middlemore	Unopposed		
Liberal Unionist hold				

=== Elections in the 1900s ===
General election 1900: Birmingham North
Party	Candidate	Votes	%	±%
Liberal Unionist	John Middlemore	Unopposed		
Liberal Unionist hold				

General election 1906: Birmingham North
Party	Candidate	Votes	%	±%
Liberal Unionist	John Middlemore	5,172	80.2	N/A
Liberal	Joseph Hood	1,275	19.8	New
Majority		3,897	60.4	N/A
Turnout		6,447	71.8	N/A
Registered electors		8,981		
Liberal Unionist hold		Swing	N/A	

=== Elections in the 1910s ===
General election January 1910: Birmingham North
Party	Candidate	Votes	%	±%
Liberal Unionist	John Middlemore	5,189	84.0	+3.8
Liberal	Joseph Dawson	988	16.0	−3.8
Majority		4,201	68.0	+7.6
Turnout		6,177	73.1	+1.3
Liberal Unionist hold		Swing	+3.8	

General election December 1910: Birmingham North
Party	Candidate	Votes	%	±%
Liberal Unionist	John Middlemore	Unopposed		
Liberal Unionist hold				

General Election 1914–15:

Another General Election was required to take place before the end of 1915. The political parties had been making preparations for an election to take place and by July 1914, the following candidates had been selected;

- Unionist: John Middlemore
- Liberal: Norman Birkett

== See also ==
- List of former United Kingdom Parliament constituencies
