= List of mayors of Birmingham =

Lord Mayor of Birmingham
- Coat of arms of Birmingham
- Incumbent; Zaker Choudhry, Liberal Democrats since May 2026
- Style: Lord Mayor
- Member of: Birmingham City Council
- Residence: Birmingham
- Appointer: Birmingham City Council
- Term length: 1 Year
- Formation: 1838
- Succession: Zaker Choudhry
- Deputy: Yvonne Mosquito
- Website: Mayor website

This is a list of the mayors and lord mayors of Birmingham in the West Midlands of England. Birmingham has had a mayor (and elected council) since 1838. The office was raised to the dignity of lord mayor when Queen Victoria issued letters patent on 3 June 1896.

By modern convention, the lord mayor stands for a year, and is installed into office at the annual meeting of the city council. Lord mayors are non-political and non-executive during their term of office and act as chair of the council. As the First Citizen of Birmingham, the lord mayor represents not only the city but also the people of Birmingham. The honour of being lord mayor is now usually alternated between the Conservative, Labour and Liberal Democrat Groups. In normal circumstances the Lord Mayor becomes Deputy Lord Mayor for the following year.

== Mayors of Birmingham ==
=== 1838–1895 ===
No.	Mayor	Image	Tenure	Terms	Notes
1	William Scholefield		1838–1839	1	Second son of Joshua Scholefield, one of Birmingham's first MPs when the town was enfranchised in 1832.
2	Philip Henry Muntz		1839–1840	2	Councillor, alderman, mayor, justice of the peace and representative of Birmingham in Parliament.
3	Samuel Beale		1841	1	MP for Derby between 1857–65. Unitarian.
4	James James		1842	1	
5	Thomas Weston		1843	1	Unitarian
6	Thomas Phillips		1844	1	
7	Henry Smith		1845	1	
8	Robert Martineau		1846	1	
9	Charles Geach		1847	1	Founder of the Birmingham & Midland Bank
10	Samuel Thornton		1848	1	
11	William Lucy		1849–1850	2	
12	Henry Smith		1851	1	
13	Henry Hawkes		1852	1	
14	James Baldwin		1853	1	Paper manufacturer, owner of James Baldwin & Sons, est. 1829. Unitarian.
15	John Palmer		1854	1	Unitarian
16	T P T Hodgson		1855	1	
17	Sir John Ratcliff		1856–1858	3	Also Town Commissioner, Low Baliff, Town Councillor, Alderman
18	Thomas Lloyd		1859	1	
19	Arthur Ryland		1860	1	
20	Henry Manton		1861	1	
21	Charles Sturge		1862	1	Corn merchant, brother of Joseph Sturge
22	William Holliday		1863	1	
23	Henry Wiggin		1864	1	
24	Edwin Yates		1865	1	
25	George Dixon		1866	1	Birmingham MP, was a major proponent of education for all children.
26	Thomas Avery		1866–1867	1	Elected on the resignation of Dixon
27	Henry Holland		1868	1	
28	Thomas Prime		1869	1	Silver-plater. Northwood Street. Thomas Prime & Sons.
29	G Braithwaite Lloyd		1870	1	
30	John Sadler		1871	1	
31	Ambrose Biggs		1872	1	Tobacco product manufacturer and retailer. Declared bankrupt in 1883. Unitarian.
32	Joseph Chamberlain		1873–1876	3	Unitarian.
33	George Baker		1876	1	Elected on the resignation of Chamberlain in June 1876. Second master of Guild of St George.
34	William Kenrick		1877	1	
35	Jesse Collings		1878	1	
36	Richard Chamberlain		1879–1880	2	Brother of Joseph Chamberlain
37	Thomas Avery		1881	1	
38	William White		1882	1	
39	William Cook		1883	1	MP for Birmingham East in 1885/1886
40	Sir Thomas Martineau		1884–1886	3	
41	Maurice Pollack		1887	1	
42	Richard Cadbury Barrow		1888	1	
43	Francis Corder Clayton		1889–1890	2	
44	Edward Lawley Parker		1891–1892	2	
45	George James Johnson		1893	1	
46	Thomas Stratton Fallows		1894	1	
47	James Smith		1895	2	

== Lord Mayors of Birmingham ==
=== 19th century ===
No.	Lord Mayor	Image	Tenure	Terms	Notes
1	Sir James Smith		1896	2	
2	Charles Gabriel Beale		1897–1899	4	depicted in the gowns of the Pro-Chancellor of the University of Birmingham
3	Samuel Edwards		1900	1	

=== 20th century ===
Lord Mayor	Image	Tenure	Terms	Notes
John Henry Lloyd		1901-02	1	
Sir Hallewell Rogers		1902–04	2	Liberal Unionist
Rowland Hill Berkeley		1904-05	1	Died 13 April 1905; a great-grandfather of Pink Floyd drummer Nick Mason.
Charles Gabriel Beale		1905	4	
Alfred John Reynolds		1905-06	1	
Henry James Sayer		1906–1908	2	
Sir George Hamilton Kenrick		1908-09	1	
William Henry Bowater		1909–1912	4	Knighted in 1916
Ernest Martineau		1912–1914	2	
William Henry Bowater		1914–1915	4	Elected on the resignation of Martineau in September 1914
Neville Chamberlain		1915–1917	2	March 1915 – December 1916; Son of Joseph Chamberlain and future Prime Minister
Arthur David Brooks		1917–1919	3	
William Adlington Cadbury		1919–1921	2	Second son of Richard Cadbury
Sir David Davis		1921–1923	2	
Thomas Oswald Williams		1923–1924	1	
Percival Bower		1924–1926	2	
Alfred Henry James		1926–1928	2	
Wilfred Byng Kenrick		1928–1929	1	
Martin Lewis Lancaster		1929–1930	1	
Walter Willis Saunders		1930–1931	1	
Sir John Bedford Burman		1931–1932	1	
Horace Edward Goodby		1932–1934	2	
Samuel John Grey		1934–1936	2	
Harold Roberts		1936–1937	1	
Ernest Robert Canning		1937–1938	1	
James Crump		1938–1939	1	
Theodore Beal Pritchett		1939–1940	1	
Sir Wilfred Martineau		1940–1941	1	
Norman Tiptaft		1941–1942	1	
Walter Samuel Lewis		1942–1943	1	
Lionel George Helmore Alldridge		1943–1944	1	
William Theophilus Wiggins-Davies		1944–1945	1	
Alan Stewart Giles		1945–1946	1	
Albert Frederick Bradbeer		1946–1947	1	
John Charles Burman		1947–1949	2	Son of Sir John Bedford Burman
Hubert Humphreys		1949–1950	1	
Alfred Paddon-Smith		1950–1951	1	
Ralph Cyril Yates		1951–1952	1	
William Tegfryn Bowen		1952–1953	1	
George Henry Wilson Griffith		1953–1954	1	
Joseph Reginald Balmer		1954–1955	1	
Arthur Lummis Gibson		1955–1956	1	
Ernest William Apps		1956–1957	1	
John Joseph Grogan		1957–1958	1	
Donald Johnstone		1958–1959	1	
John Henry Lewis		1959–1960	1	
Garnet Benjamin Boughton		1960–1961	1	
Eric Edward Mole		1961–1962	1	
Ernest Walter Horton		1962–1963	1	
Louis Glass		1963–1964	1	
Frank Leslie Price		1964–1965	1	
George Corbyn Barrow		1965–1966	1	
Harold Edward Tyler		1966–1967	1	
James Stephen Meadows		1967–1968	1	
Charles Valentine George Simpson		1968–1969	1	
Neville Bosworth		1969–1970	1	Leader of Birmingham City Council from 1976 to 1980 and 1982 to 1984
Stanley Bleyer		1970–1971	1	
Victor Ernest Turton		1971–1972	1	
Frederick Thomas Duncan Hall		1972–1973	1	
Marjorie Alice Brown		1973–1974	1	The first woman to be Lord Mayor.
Eric James Eames		1974–1975	1	
Albert Leslie Samuel Jackson		1975–1976	1	
Harold Powell		1976–1977	1	
Freda Mary Cocks		1977–1978	1	
Edward Frederick Hanson		1978–1979	1	
George Canning		1979–1980	1	
Joseph Morris Bailey		1980–1981	1	
Kenneth Benjamin Barton		1981–1982	1	
Peter Hollingworth		1982–1983	1	
William John Hele Sowton		1983–1984	1	
Reginald John Hales		1984–1985	1	
Frank William Carter		1985–1986	1	
Alan Denis Martineau		1986–1987	1	
Frederick James Grattidge		1987–1988	1	
Harold Charles Blumenthal		1988–1989	1	
Frederick John Chapman		1989–1990	1	
Sir Bernard Philip Zissman		1990–1991	1	
William Henry Turner		1991–1992	1	
Peter James Philip Barwell		1992–1993	1	
Paul Tilsley		1993–1994	1	
Sir Richard Knowles		1994-1995	1	Leader of Birmingham City Council from 1984 to 1993.
David Roy		1995–1996	1	
Marion Arnott-Job		1996–1997	1	
Sybil Spence		1997–1998	1	The first Black Lord Mayor.
Susan Anderson		1998–1999	1	
Ian McArdle		1999–2000	1	
Theresa Stewart		2000–2001	1	Leader of Birmingham City Council from 1993 to 1999.

=== 21st century ===
No.	Lord Mayor	Image	Tenure	Terms	Notes
92	Jim Whorwood		2001–2002	1	
93	Mahmood Hussain		2002–2003	1	
94	John Alden		2003–2004	1	
95	Mike Nangle		2004–2005	1	
96	John Hood		2005–2006	1	
97	Mike Sharpe		2006–2007	1	
98	Randal Brew		2007–2008	1	
99	Chauhdry Abdul Rashid		2008–2009	1	
100	Michael Wilkes		2009–2010	1	
101	Len Gregory		2010–2011	1	
102	Anita Ward		2011–2012	1	
103	John Lines		2012–2013	1	
104	Mike Leddy		2013–2014	1	
105	Shafique Shah		2014–2015	1	
106	Ray Hassall		2015–2016	1	
107	Carl Rice		2016–2017	1	
108	Anne Underwood		2017–2018	1	
109	Yvonne Mosquito		2018–2019	1	
110	Mohammed Azim		2019–2021	2	Served an extra year due to the COVID-19 pandemic
111	Muhammad Afzal		2021–2022	1	Sworn in 25 May 2021. He was chosen in 2020, but delayed a year due to the COVID-19 pandemic
112	Maureen Cornish		2022–2023	1	Mayor making 24 May 2022.
113	Chaman Lal		2023–2024	1	The first Indian and Sikh descent mayor. Term started 23 May 2023
114	Ken Wood	Cllr Ken Wood	2024–2025	1	Sworn in on 21 May 2024.
115	Zafar Iqbal		2025–2026	1	Sworn in on 20 May 2025.
116	Zaker Choudhry		2026–2027	1	Sworn in on 20 May 2026
