= Woolsey (surname) =

Woolsey is a surname, and may refer to:

- Abby Howland Woolsey (1828–1893), American social worker and nursing educator
- Bill Woolsey (1934–2022), American swimmer
- Calvin Woolsey (1883–1946), American physician and pianist
- Clinton F. Woolsey (1894–1927), United States Army aviator and flying instructor
- Clinton N. Woolsey (1904–1993), American neuroscientist
- Durrel A. Woolsey (1926–2019), American oil executive and general authority of the LDS Church
- Elizabeth Woolsey (1908–1997), American alpine skier
- Gamel Woolsey (1897–1968), American author and poet
- Gary Woolsey (1942–2013), Canadian Anglican bishop
- Georgeanna Woolsey (1833–1906), American author and nurse
- James Woolsey (1941–2026), American lawyer, director of the CIA
- Jane Stuart Woolsey (1830–1891), American nursing administrator, philanthropist and author
- John M. Woolsey (1877–1945), American judge
- John M. Woolsey Jr. (1916–2005), American attorney
- John William Woolsey (1767–1853), Canadian businessman and president of Quebec Bank
- Karey Lee Woolsey (born 1976), American singer-songwriter
- King Woolsey (c.1832–1879), American rancher, prospector and politician in Arizona
- Kit Woolsey (born 1943), American bridge and backgammon player
- Kristina Hooper Woolsey, American scholar and cognitive scientist
- Lynn Woolsey (born 1937), American politician
- Mary Hale Woolsey (1899–1969), American songwriter and lyricist
- Melancthon Brooks Woolsey (1817–1874), United States Navy officer
- Melancthon Taylor Woolsey (1782–1838), United States Navy officer
- Ralph Woolsey (1914–2018), American cinematographer
- Robert Woolsey (1888–1938), American film comedian
- Rolly Woolsey (born 1953), American football player
- Sandy Woolsey (born 1972), American artistic gymnast
- Sally Woolsey, American bridge player
- Sarah Chauncey Woolsey (1835–1905), American children's author
- Ted Woolsey, American video game translator
- Theodore Dwight Woolsey (1801–1889), American academic, author and president of Yale University
- Theodore Salisbury Woolsey (1852–1929), American legal scholar, son of the above
- Theodore Salisbury Woolsey, Jr. (1879–1933), American forestry researcher and academic, son of Theodore Salisbury Woolsey
- Thomas Woolsey (born 1943), American neuroscientist

== See also ==
- Wolsey (surname)
- Woolley (surname)
- Wolseley (surname)
