= Woolsey =

Woolsey may refer to:

In places:

- Woolsey Memorial Airport, a small airport in Michigan
- Woolsey, Georgia, USA, a town
- Woolsey Flat, California, USA, a former settlement
- Woolsey Hall, the primary auditorium at Yale University in New Haven, Connecticut.

In people:

- Woolsey (surname)
- Thomas Wolsey (died 1530), English statesman and clergyman

In fictional characters:

- Richard Woolsey, a character in Stargate SG-1 and Stargate Atlantis

In other uses:

- USS Woolsey, two ships in the United States Navy
- Woolsey (convention), a Bridge convention
- The Woolsey Fire, a 2018 wildfire in southern California

== See also ==
- Wolsey (disambiguation)
- Wolseley (disambiguation)
