= Wolsey (disambiguation) =

Thomas Wolsey (1473–1530) was an English statesman and clergyman.

Wolsey may also refer to:

== People ==
- Wolsey (surname)
- Henry Wolsey Bayfield (1795–1885), British hydrographic surveyor

== Places ==
- Wolsey, South Dakota, United States
- Wolsey Shale, a geologic formation in Montana

== Other uses ==
- Wolsey (clothing), one of the oldest textile companies in the world
- HMS Wolsey, a British destroyer commissioned in 1918 and sold in 1947 for scrapping
- Wolsey (cat), a Doctor Who spin-off companion

== See also ==
- Wolseley (disambiguation)
- Woolsey (disambiguation)
