= Days of May =

Social unrest in the United Kingdom in May 1832

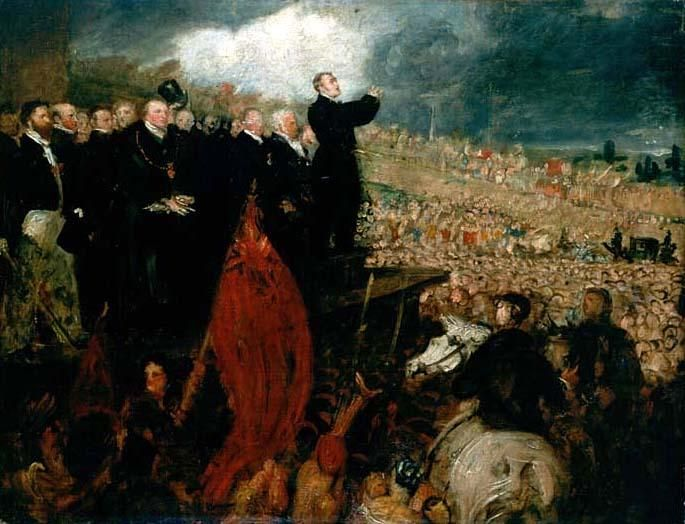
A meeting of the Birmingham Political Union during May 1832, painted by Benjamin Haydon

The Days of May was a period of significant social unrest and political tension in the United Kingdom in May 1832, after the Tories (Note: Predecessor of the now Conservative Party.) in the House of Lords blocked the Third Reform Bill, which aimed to extend parliamentary representation to the middle and working classes as well as the newly industrialised cities of the English Midlands and the North of England.

The campaign to broaden the electoral franchise had garnered wide and organised national support over the preceding years, led by Thomas Attwood's Birmingham Political Union, which boasted that it "had united two million men peacefully and legally in one grand and determined association to recover the liberty, the happiness, and the prosperity of the country".

While Attwood was careful to keep the unions' activities legal and non-violent, he also encouraged the widespread belief that they were potentially a powerful and independent extra-parliamentary force; he boasted that the nation could be mobilised in an hour. The fall of the bill, and the subsequent resignation of the Whig government of Earl Grey, were met with rioting, campaigns of economic sabotage and threats of armed insurrection that many contemporaries judged to be credible.

The crisis was defused by the reinstatement of Grey's government on 15 May and King William IV's agreement in principle to create enough new peers to build a Whig majority in the Lords which would allow the bill to pass. The Lords backed down in the face of this threat, and the Great Reform Act was passed by Parliament. It received Royal Assent on 7 June 1832.

Historians debate as to how decisive this extra-parliamentary pressure was in securing the passage of the bill, but the period is seen as one of the times when the United Kingdom came closest to a revolution, which could have also led to the end of the monarchy in the manner of France.

== Background ==
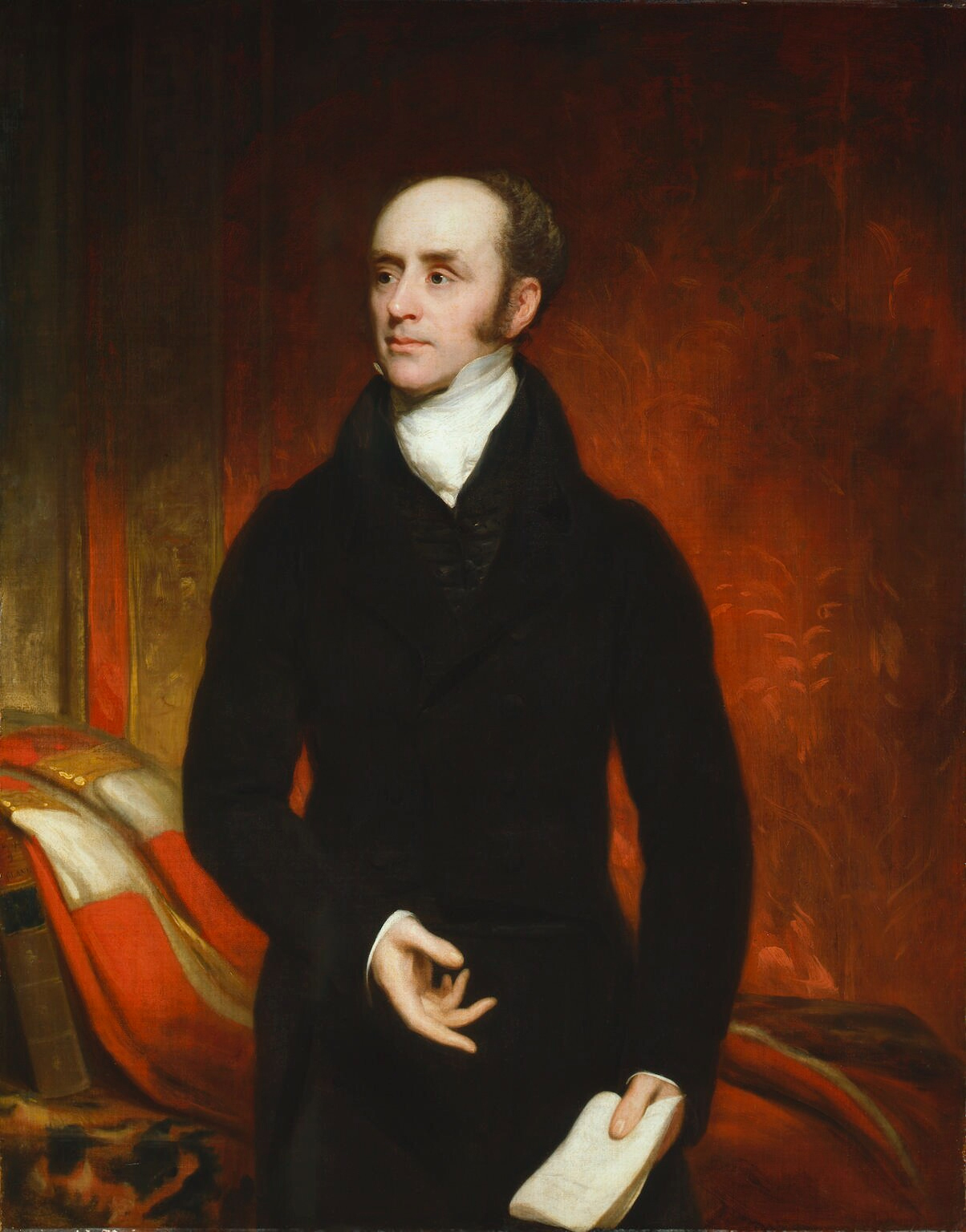
Portrait of Earl Grey by Thomas Phillips, 1820. Charles Grey, 2nd Earl Grey, the Whig Prime Minister

Parliamentary representation was limited and haphazard in 18th and early 19th century Britain: in 1780 it was calculated that there were only 214,000 qualified to vote in England and Wales out of a total population of 8 million; and property qualifications varied widely between constituencies. The onset of the Industrial Revolution wrought sweeping social and economic change across the country, but the unchanged electoral system left political structures which failed to reflect the realities of economic power. In 1830, fifty-six rotten boroughs elected two MPs each but had fewer than fifty voters, while Manchester, Birmingham, Leeds and Sheffield, with a combined population of more than 540,000, had not one MP between them.

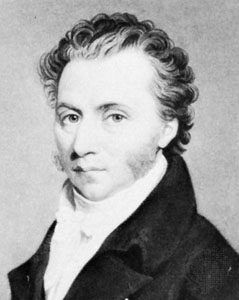
Thomas Attwood.

Reform also had a record of inspiring popular discontent. In 1819 a crowd of 15,000 had gathered at Newhall Hill in Birmingham to symbolically elect Charles Wolseley as the town's "Legislatorial Attorney and Representative" in Westminster; when Manchester followed Birmingham's lead two months later, troops opened fire and killed 15: this event became known as the Peterloo Massacre.

Lord John Russell tried sporadically and unsuccessfully during the 1820s to abolish specific rotten boroughs and transfer representation to larger towns, but the newly elected Whig government headed by Earl Grey in November 1830 was the first to commit to parliamentary reform. Grey formed a committee to draft reform proposals that would be sufficient to quell public opinion and "afford sure ground of resistance to further innovation", but the resulting Reform Bill received only lukewarm support in parliament and further elections were held in May 1831. Newly armed with a majority of over 130 seats, Grey introduced a Second Reform Bill in July 1831, which passed through the House of Commons with a majority of 140, but was defeated in the House of Lords in October amid rioting in Derby, Nottingham and Bristol.

By the 1830s the most influential extra-parliamentary support for reform came from the Birmingham Political Union, which had been founded by Thomas Attwood in December 1829 as "a General Political Union between the lower and middle classes of the people" to engineer the political reform that Attwood had come to think necessary to achieve his ultimate goal of currency reform. The unusually small size of the units of production characteristic of the Birmingham economy, coupled with the resulting high degree of social mobility and shared economic interest between Birmingham workers and factory owners, enabled the BPU to attract a broad support across classes and maintain its position of leadership among the hundreds of more fragmented unions that followed its example and formed across the country in 1830 and 1831.

The BPU had made its reputation amid the spontaneous rioting that had accompanied the fall of the First Reform Bill in 1831, assembling 150,000 protesters at Newhall Hill in the largest political assembly the country had ever seen. Its threat to reorganise itself along semi-military lines in November 1831 had led to suggestions that it was trying to usurp the civil authority, and made a deliberate, if implicit, threat of the possibility of armed revolt in the event of the formation of an anti-reform government. The Times called the BPU "the barometer of the reform feeling throughout England", while Attwood himself was dubbed "King Tom" by William Cobbett and described by Francis Place as "the most influential man in England".

== Causes of the riots ==
=== Change of leader ===
On 9 May 1832, after the Great Reform Act had been vetoed by the House of Lords, the then Prime Minister, Earl Grey, handed in his resignation. He was replaced by the Duke of Wellington, a Tory, who opposed the Reform Act. Lord Grey commented that Wellington was a man who "didn't understand the character of the times", referring to the fact that Wellington believed the pressure for change was insignificant and the electoral system was fine as it was.

=== BPU meeting ===
The news of Grey's resignation was not reported in London on the day it happened, but on 10 May 1832, news reached Birmingham about the situation.

== Progress and events ==
Pro-reform organisations such as the Birmingham Political Union played a major part in the protests; their membership swelled, causing politicians to fear an armed riot. The organised nature of the protests, which encompassed people of many different backgrounds, led to fears among the wealthy that a general uprising was imminent, triggering a rush of gold withdrawals from the Bank of England. Petitions were also presented from around the country. On 15 May, Wellington's position had become untenable, leading to his resignation. Grey was invited to return as Prime Minister and to form a government. The House of Lords subsequently agreed to the Bill after William IV threatened to create new Whig peers to ensure the passage of the Great Reform Act.

== Revolutionary potential ==
Although at the time it was claimed that the nation could be mobilised in an hour, commentators disagree on how real the threat of revolution was during the Days of May. Contemporary observers had little doubt: Edward Littleton, then a Whig MP, commented in his diary that the country was "in a state little short of insurrection", while the Anglican clergyman Sydney Smith later described a "hand-shaking, bowel-disturbing passion of fear". As Thomas Creevey observed, this fear was shared by the Queen, whose "fixed impression, is that an English revolution is rapidly approaching, and that her own fate is to be that of Marie Antoinette". Some more modern historians agree: E. P. Thompson wrote that "in the autumn of 1831 and in the 'Days of May' Britain was within an ace of revolution" and Eric Hobsbawm felt that "This period is probably the only one in modern history ... where something not unlike a revolutionary situation might have developed."

== See also ==
- National Political Union

== Bibliography ==
- Briggs, Asa (1948), "Thomas Attwood and the Economic Background of the Birmingham Political Union", Cambridge Historical Journal, 9 (2): 190–216, doi:10.1017/S1474691300001992, JSTOR 3020620
- Briggs, Asa (1952), "The Background of the Parliamentary Reform Movement in Three English Cities (1830-2)", Cambridge Historical Journal, 10 (3): 293–317, doi:10.1017/S1474691300002973, JSTOR 3021116
- Butler, J. R. M. (1914), The Passing of the Great Reform Bill, Longmans Green, OCLC 891220, archived from the original on 2012-10-19 – via Questia
- Cannon, John Ashton (1973), Parliamentary Reform 1640-1832, Cambridge University Press, ISBN 0-521-09736-3
- Evans, Eric J. (1983), The Great Reform Act of 1832, Routledge, ISBN 0-416-34450-X
- Ferguson, Henry (March 1960), "The Birmingham Political Union and the Government 1831-32", Victorian Studies, 3 (3): 261–276, JSTOR 3825499
- Flick, Carlos T. (August 1971), "Thomas Attwood, Francis Place, and the Agitation for British Parliamentary Reform", The Huntington Library Quarterly, 34 (4): 355–366, doi:10.2307/3816950, JSTOR 3816950
- Hilton, Boyd (2006), A Mad, Bad, and Dangerous People?: England, 1783-1846, Oxford University Press, ISBN 0-19-822830-9
- LoPatin-Lummis, Nancy (2008), "Birmingham Political Union (act. 1829–1839)", Oxford Dictionary of National Biography (Online ed.), Oxford University Press
- Martin, Howard (1996), Britain in the Nineteenth Century, Cheltenham: Nelson Thornes, ISBN 0-17-435062-7
- Moss, David J. (1990), Thomas Attwood: The Biography of a Radical, Montreal: McGill-Queen's Press, ISBN 0-7735-0708-6
- Royle, Edward (2000), Revolutionary Britannia?: Reflections on the Threat of Revolution in Britain, 1789-1848, Manchester: Manchester University Press, ISBN 0-7190-4803-6
- Randall, Adrian (2006), Riotous Assemblies: Popular Protest in Hanoverian England, Oxford University Press, ISBN 0-19-925990-9
- Rudé, George (July 1967), "English Rural and Urban Disturbances on the Eve of the First Reform Bill, 1830-1831", Past and Present (37): 87–102, doi:10.1093/past/37.1.87, JSTOR 650024
