= National Political Union =

National Political Union can refer to

- National Political Union (England), an organisation founded in 1831 to agitate for extension of the franchise
- National Political Union (1946), a Greek coalition of political parties from 1946 to 1950
- National Political Union (1984), a Greek political party founded in 1984 and dissolved in 1996
