= Charles Wolseley =

Charles Wolseley may refer to:

- Sir Charles Wolseley, 2nd Baronet (1630–1714), English politician
- Sir Charles Wolseley, 7th Baronet (1769–1846)
