= Wolseley (surname) =

Wolseley is a surname, and may refer to:

- Cadwallader Wolseley (1806–1872), Irish Anglican priest
- Sir Charles Wolseley, 2nd Baronet (c. 1630–1714), English politician
- Sir Charles Wolseley, 7th Baronet (1769–1846), English landowner and political agitator
- Frances Garnet Wolseley, 2nd Viscountess Wolseley (1872–1936), English gardener
- Frederick Wolseley (1837–1899), Australian woolgrower and inventor of sheep shearing machinery
- Garnet Wolseley, 1st Viscount Wolseley (1833–1913), British field marshal, elder brother of Frederick Wolseley
- George Wolseley (1839–1921), British Indian Army officer
- Pat Wolseley (born 1938), British botanist and illustrator
- Sir Reginald Wolseley, 10th Baronet (1872–1933), emigrated to the US and initially refused the title
- William Wolseley (English Army officer) (c. 1640–1697), English army officer
- William Wolseley (Royal Navy officer) (1756–1842), Royal Navy officer
- William Hulbert Wolseley (1821–1899), Irish Anglican priest

== See also ==
- Wolsey (surname)
