= John Woolsey =

John Woolsey may refer to:

- John M. Woolsey, American judge
- John M. Woolsey Jr., his son, American attorney
- John William Woolsey (1767–1853), Canadian businessman and president of Quebec Bank
