= Reform Act 1832 =

UK law reforming the electoral system

Representation of the People Act 1832 (Note: The citation of this act by this short title was authorised by the Short Titles Act 1896, section 1 and the first schedule. Due to the repeal of those provisions it is now authorised by section 19(2) of the Interpretation Act 1978.)
- Act of Parliament
- Parliament of the United Kingdom
- Long title: An Act to amend the representation of the people in England and Wales
- Citation: 2 & 3 Will. 4. c. 45
- Introduced by: Prime Minister Charles Grey, 2nd Earl Grey
- Territorial extent: England and Wales (Note: Preamble. In Scotland and Ireland, the Scottish Reform Act 1832 (2 & 3 Will. 4. c. 65) and Irish Reform Act 1832 (2 & 3 Will. 4. c. 88) applied, respectively))

Dates
- Royal assent: 7 June 1832
- Commencement: 7 June 1832 (Note: The Acts of Parliament (Commencement) Act 1793.)
- Repealed: 30 July 1948
Other legislation
| Amended by | Statute Law Revision Act 1874; Statute Law Revision Act 1890; Representation of the People Act 1918 |
| Repealed by | Representation of the People Act 1948 |
| Relates to | Parliamentary Elections Act 1695; Scottish Reform Act 1832; Irish Reform Act 1832; Reform Act 1867 |

Status: Repealed

Text of statute as originally enacted

Corporate Property (Elections) Act 1832 (Note: The citation of this act by this short title was authorised by section 1 of, and the first schedule to, the Short Titles Act 1896. Due to the repeal of those provisions it is now authorised by section 19(2) of the Interpretation Act 1978.)
- Act of Parliament
- Parliament of the United Kingdom
- Long title: An Act to prevent the Application of Corporate Property to the Purposes of Election of Members to serve in Parliament.
- Citation: 2 & 3 Will. 4. c. 69
- Territorial extent: United Kingdom

Dates
- Royal assent: 1 August 1832
- Commencement: 1 August 1832 (Note: Section 1.)
- Repealed: 24 November 1949
Other legislation
| Amended by | Municipal Corporations Act 1882 |
| Repealed by | Representation of the People Act 1949 |

Status: Repealed

Text of statute as originally enacted

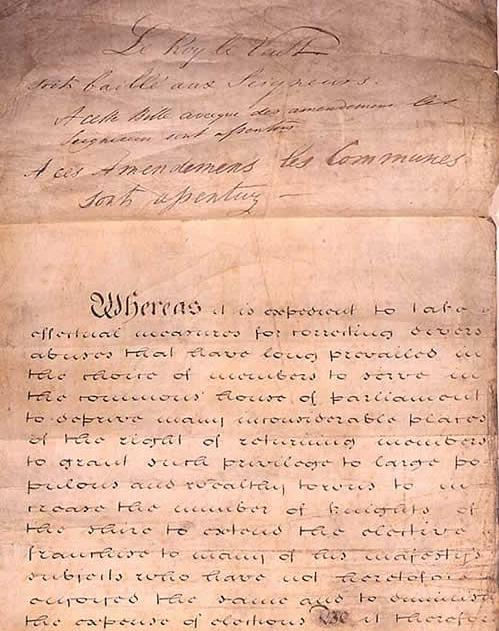
Start of parchment roll of the Reform Act 1832, with royal assent of King William IV

The Representation of the People Act 1832 (2 & 3 Will. 4. c. 45), also known as the Reform Act 1832, Great Reform Act or First Reform Act, was an act of the Parliament of the United Kingdom to reform the electoral system in England and Wales and to expand the male franchise, but excluded women from voting. The measure was brought forward by the Whig government of Prime Minister Charles Grey, 2nd Earl Grey.

The legislation granted the right to vote to a broader segment of the male population by standardising property qualifications, extending the franchise to small landowners, tenant farmers, shopkeepers, and all householders who paid a yearly rental of £10 or more. The act also reapportioned constituencies to address the unequal distribution of seats. The act formally excluded women from voting, as a voter was defined in the Act as a male person; prior to 1832 there were occasional, rare, instances of women voting. The act of England and Wales was accompanied by the Scottish Reform Act 1832 (2 & 3 Will. 4. c. 65) and Irish Reform Act 1832 (2 & 3 Will. 4. c. 88).

The passage of the Act was very difficult. The first version advanced through the legislative process, but narrowly failed in the House of Commons. The King dissolved parliament at the Prime Minister's request, and the Whigs won a landslide victory in the subsequent election. A second version then passed the House of Commons with a 100 vote majority, but was defeated in the House of Lords. A third version was weakened by procedural maneuvers, and the Prime Minister resigned. Popular unrest spread through the country, leading to the Days of May, and pushing the country to brink of revolution. The Whigs gained the King's support to threaten to pack the House of Lords with Whigs, which caused the opposition to back down, and the final passage of the bill.

The historiography of the Reform Act is marked by longstanding debates over its causes, nature, and impact. Scholars have long grappled with whether it was a radical modernising movement that expanded democracy by widening the franchise or a conservative measure intended to preserve aristocratic rule by making necessary concessions.

The act was repealed by the Representation of the People Act 1948. The electoral system in the UK is now defined principally by the Representation of the People Act 1983 and the Electoral Administration Act 2006.

== Unreformed House of Commons ==
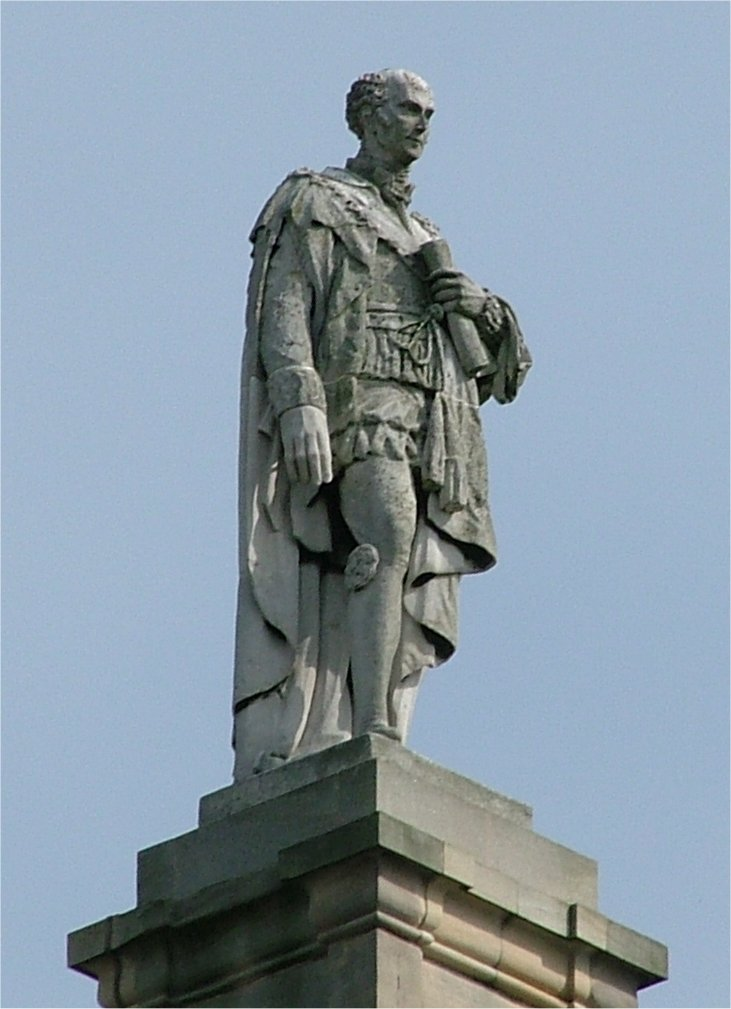
Grey's Monument in Newcastle upon Tyne, in remembrance of Prime Minister Charles Grey, 2nd Earl Grey, abolisher of slavery in the British Empire

After the Acts of Union 1800 became law on 1 January 1801, the unreformed House of Commons comprised 658 members, of whom 513 represented England and Wales. There were two types of constituency: counties and boroughs. County members were supposed to represent landholders, while borough members were supposed to represent mercantile and trading interests.

=== Counties ===
Counties were historical national subdivisions established between the 8th and 16th centuries. They were not merely parliamentary constituencies: many components of government (as well as courts and the militia) were organised along county lines.

=== Boroughs ===
Parliamentary boroughs in England ranged in size from small hamlets to large cities, partly because they had evolved haphazardly. The earliest boroughs were chosen in the Middle Ages by county sheriffs, and even a village might be deemed a borough. Many of these early boroughs (such as Winchelsea and Dunwich) were substantial settlements at the time of their original enfranchisement, but later went into decline, and by the early 19th century some only had a few electors, but still elected two MPs; they were often known as rotten boroughs. Of the 70 English boroughs that Tudor monarchs enfranchised, 31 were later disfranchised.

=== The franchise ===
Before the reform, most members of Parliament nominally represented boroughs. However, the number of electors in a borough varied widely, from a dozen or so up to 12,000. The criteria for qualification for the franchise also varied greatly among these boroughs, from the requirement to own land, to merely living in a house with a hearth sufficient to boil a pot.

Statutes passed in 1430 and 1432, during the reign of Henry VI, standardised property qualifications for county voters. Under these Acts, all owners of freehold property or land with an annual value of at least forty shillings in a particular county were entitled to vote in that county. This requirement, known as the forty shilling freehold, was never adjusted for inflation of land value; thus the amount of land one had to own in order to vote gradually diminished over time. (Note: 40 shillings, or £2, was equivalent to £1,700 in 2025 terms in 1430, but had dropped to £190 in 2025 terms by 1832.) The franchise was restricted to men by custom rather than statute; on rare occasions women had been able to vote in parliamentary elections as a result of property ownership. Nevertheless, the vast majority of people were not entitled to vote; the size of the English county electorate in 1831 has been estimated at only 200,000 and 400,000 enfranchised Englishmen overall. Furthermore, the sizes of the individual county constituencies varied significantly. The smallest counties, Rutland and Anglesey, had fewer than 1,000 voters each, while the largest county, Yorkshire, had more than 20,000. Those who owned property in multiple constituencies could vote multiple times. Not only was this typically legal (since there was usually no need for a property owner to live in a constituency in order to vote there) it was also feasible, even with the technology of the time, since polling was usually held over several days.

In boroughs the franchise was far more varied. There were broadly six types of parliamentary boroughs, as defined by their franchise:

1. Boroughs in which freemen were electors;
2. Boroughs in which the franchise was restricted to those paying scot and lot, a form of municipal taxation;
3. Boroughs in which only the ownership of a burgage property qualified a person to vote;
4. Boroughs in which only members of the corporation were electors (such boroughs were perhaps in every case "pocket boroughs", because corporation members were usually "in the pocket" of a wealthy patron);
5. Boroughs in which male householders were electors (these were usually known as "potwalloper boroughs", as the usual definition of a householder was a person able to boil a pot on his/her own hearth);
6. Boroughs in which freeholders of land had the right to vote.

Some boroughs had a combination of these varying types of franchise, and most had special rules and exceptions, so many boroughs had a form of franchise that was unique to themselves.

The largest borough, Westminster, had about 12,000 voters (and two seats until 1885), while many of the smallest, usually known as "rotten boroughs", had fewer than 100 each and at least one seat each. The most famous rotten borough was Old Sarum, which had 13 burgage plots that could be used to "manufacture" electors if necessary—usually around half a dozen was thought sufficient. Other examples were Dunwich (32 voters), Camelford (25), and Gatton (7).

=== Pocket boroughs ===
Many constituencies, especially those with small electorates, were under the control of rich landowners, and were known as nomination boroughs or pocket boroughs, because they were said to be in the pockets of their patrons. Most patrons were noblemen or landed gentry who could use their local influence, prestige, and wealth to sway the voters. This was particularly true in rural counties, and in small boroughs situated near a large landed estate. Some noblemen even controlled multiple constituencies: for example, the Duke of Norfolk controlled eleven, while the Earl of Lonsdale controlled nine. Writing in 1821, Sydney Smith proclaimed that "The country belongs to the Duke of Rutland, Lord Lonsdale, the Duke of Newcastle, and about twenty other holders of boroughs. They are our masters!" T. H. B. Oldfield stated in his Representative History of Great Britain and Ireland that, out of the 514 members representing England and Wales, about 370 were selected by nearly 180 patrons. A member who represented a pocket borough was expected to vote as his patron ordered, or else lose his seat at the next election. Voters in some constituencies resisted outright domination by powerful landlords, but were often open to corruption.

== Movement for reform ==
=== Effects of the French Revolution ===
Support for parliamentary reform in Britain plummeted following the beginning of the French Revolution in 1789. The revolution led many British politicians to become steadfastly opposed to major political change. Despite this, several radical groups were established in Britain to agitate for reform. A group of Whigs led by the Earl of Lauderdale and Charles Grey founded an organisation advocating parliamentary reform in 1792. This group, known as the Society of the Friends of the People, included 28 MPs. In 1793, Grey presented to the House of Commons a petition from the Friends of the People, outlining abuses of the system and demanding change. He did not propose any specific scheme of reform, but merely a motion that the House inquire into possible improvements. Parliament's reaction to the French Revolution was so negative that even this request for an inquiry was rejected by a margin of almost 200 votes. Grey tried to raise the subject again in 1797, but the House again rebuffed him by a majority of over 150.

Other notable pro-reform organisations included the Hampden Clubs (named after John Hampden, an English politician who fought on the Parliamentarian side during the English Civil War) and the London Corresponding Society (which consisted of workers and artisans). But the "Radical" reforms supported by these organisations (for example, universal suffrage) found even less support in Parliament. For example, when Sir Francis Burdett, chairman of the London Hampden Club, proposed a resolution in favour of universal suffrage, equally sized electoral districts, and voting by secret ballot to the House of Commons, his motion found only one other supporter (Lord Cochrane) in the entire House.

Despite such setbacks, popular pressure for reform remained strong. In 1819, a large pro-reform rally was held in Birmingham. Although the city was not entitled to any seats in the Commons, those gathered decided to elect Sir Charles Wolseley as Birmingham's "legislatorial representative". Following their example, reformers in Manchester held a similar meeting to elect a "legislatorial attorney". Between 20,000 and 60,000 (by different estimates) attended the event. The protesters were ordered to disband; when they did not, the Manchester Yeomanry suppressed the meeting by force. Eighteen people were killed and several hundred injured in what later became known as the Peterloo Massacre. In response, the government passed the Six Acts, measures designed to quell further political agitation. In particular, the Seditious Meetings Act prohibited groups of more than 50 people from assembling to discuss any political subject without prior permission from the sheriff or magistrate.

=== Reform during the 1820s ===
Since the House of Commons regularly rejected direct challenges to the system of representation by large majorities, supporters of reform had to content themselves with more modest measures. The Whig Lord John Russell brought forward one such measure in 1820, proposing the disfranchisement of the notoriously corrupt borough of Grampound in Cornwall. He suggested that the borough's two seats be transferred to the city of Leeds. Tories in the House of Lords agreed to the disfranchisement of the borough, but refused to accept the precedent of directly transferring its seats to an industrial city. Instead, they modified the proposal so that two further seats were given to Yorkshire, the county in which Leeds is situated. In this form, the bill passed both houses and became law. In 1828, Lord John Russell suggested that Parliament repeat the idea by abolishing the corrupt boroughs of Penryn and East Retford, and by transferring their seats to Manchester and Birmingham. This time, however, the House of Lords rejected his proposals. In 1830, Russell proposed another, similar scheme: the enfranchisement of Leeds, Manchester, and Birmingham, and the disfranchisement of the next three boroughs found guilty of corruption; again, the proposal was rejected.

In 1829, support for reform came from an unexpected source – a reactionary faction of the Tory Party. The Tory government under Arthur Wellesley, 1st Duke of Wellington, responding to the danger of civil strife in largely Roman Catholic Ireland, drew up the Roman Catholic Relief Act 1829. This legislation repealed various laws that imposed political disabilities on Roman Catholics, in particular laws that prevented them from becoming members of Parliament. In response, disenchanted ultra-Tories who perceived a danger to the established religion came to favour parliamentary reform, in particular the enfranchisement of Manchester, Leeds, and other heavily Nonconformist cities in northern England.

== Passage of the Reform Act ==
Spirit flask in the shape of Henry Brougham, 1st Baron Brougham and Vaux, Lord Chancellor at the time; he holds a document labelled "The Second Magna Charta."

=== First Reform Bill ===
The death of King George IV on 26 June 1830 dissolved Parliament by law, and a general election was held. Electoral reform, which had been frequently discussed during the preceding parliament, became a major campaign issue. Across the country, several pro-reform "political unions" were formed, made up of both middle and working class individuals. The most influential of these was the Birmingham Political Union, led by Thomas Attwood. These groups confined themselves to lawful means of supporting reform, such as petitioning and public oratory, and achieved a high level of public support.

Charles Grey, 2nd Earl Grey became prime minister in 1830, and his first announcement as prime minister was a pledge to carry out parliamentary reform. On 1 March 1831, Lord John Russell brought forward the Reform Bill in the House of Commons on the government's behalf. The bill disfranchised 60 of the smallest boroughs, and reduced the representation of 47 others. Some seats were completely abolished, while others were redistributed to the London suburbs, to large cities, to the counties, and to Scotland and Ireland. Furthermore, the bill standardised and expanded the borough franchise, increasing the size of the electorate (according to one estimate) by half a million voters.

On 22 March, the vote on the second reading attracted a record 608 members, including the non-voting Speaker (the previous record was 530 members). Despite the high attendance, the second reading was approved by only one vote, and further progress on the Reform Bill was difficult. During the committee stage, Isaac Gascoyne put forward a motion objecting to provisions of the bill that reduced the total number of seats in the House of Commons. This motion was carried, against the government's wishes, by 8 votes. The ministry lost a vote on a procedural motion by 22 votes. As these divisions indicated that Parliament was against the Reform Bill, the ministry decided to request a dissolution and take its appeal to the people.

=== Second Reform Bill ===
The political and popular pressure for reform had grown so great that in the 1831 general election pro-reform Whigs won as close to a landslide victory as the unreformed electoral system was capable of producing; Whig candidates won nearly every seat where there was a meaningful contest—the anti-reform Tories were reduced almost entirely to the members for the rotten boroughs. The Reform Bill was again brought before the House of Commons, which agreed to the second reading by a large majority in July. During the committee stage, opponents of the bill slowed its progress through tedious discussions of its details, but it was finally passed in September 1831, by a margin of more than 100 votes.

Public violence ensued after the Lords rejected the Reform Bill. That very evening, riots broke out in Derby. A mob attacked the city jail and freed several prisoners. In Nottingham, rioters set fire to Nottingham Castle (the home of the Duke of Newcastle) and attacked Wollaton Hall (the estate of Lord Middleton). The most significant disturbances occurred at Bristol, where rioters controlled the city for three days. The mob broke into prisons and destroyed the palace of the Bishop of Bristol, the mansion of the Lord Mayor of Bristol, and several private homes. Violence also erupted in Dorset, Leicestershire, and Somerset.

Meanwhile, the political unions, which were operating as separate groups united only by a common goal, formed together into the National Political Union. Already wary that the riots earlier in the year might be the prelude to revolution, the government saw this new organisation as a threat, and issued a proclamation pursuant to the Corresponding Societies Act 1799 declaring the association "unconstitutional and illegal", and commanding all loyal subjects to shun it. The Union continued in defiance of the proclamation, but leaders of the influential Birmingham branch decided to co-operate with the government by discouraging activities on a national level.

=== Third Reform Bill ===
After the Reform Bill was rejected in the Lords, the House of Commons immediately passed a motion of confidence affirming their support for Lord Grey's administration. Because parliamentary rules prohibited the introduction of the same bill twice during the same parliamentary session, the ministry advised the new king, William IV, to prorogue Parliament. As soon as the new session began in December 1831, the Third Reform Bill was brought forward. The bill was in a few respects different from its predecessors; it no longer proposed a reduction in the total membership of the House of Commons, and it reflected data collected during the census that had just been completed. The new version passed in the House of Commons by even larger majorities in March 1832; it was once again sent up to the House of Lords.

Realising that another rejection would not be politically feasible, opponents of reform decided to use amendments to change the bill's essential character; for example, they voted to delay consideration of clauses in the bill that disfranchised the rotten boroughs. The ministers believed that they were left with only one path to the bill's passage: to create a large number of new peerages, swamping the House of Lords with pro-reform votes, but the prerogative of creating peerages rested with the king, who recoiled from so drastic a step and rejected the unanimous advice of his cabinet. Lord Grey then resigned, and the king invited the Duke of Wellington to form a new government.

==== Verge of revolution ====
The rejection of the bill and the second resignation of Grey resulted in a period of political upheaval which has since been characterised as "the closest that Britain came to revolution". The ensuing period became known as the "Days of May"; a wave of large pro-reform demonstrations, led by the political unions, swept the country. A minority of the protestors called for the abolition of the nobility; the most radical demanded the end of the monarchy. The protests were peaceful, but their massive scale nonetheless spooked many in Parliament. With the July Revolution in France still in recent memory, many thought that if the bill did not pass, revolution was all but inevitable. The Queen believed that "an English revolution [was] rapidly approaching, and that her own fate [was] to be that of Marie Antoinette". Whig MP Edward Littleton wrote that the nation was "in a state little short of insurrection". Though the National Political Union kept within the bounds of the law, its leader Thomas Attwood boasted that "the nation could be mobilized in an hour", making it clear to all involved that the Union was a powerful extra-Parliamentary force. If an uprising broke out, the government might be unable to suppress it.

Many protesters advocated tax resistance, and orchestrated a run on the banks. Signs appeared across London reading "Stop the Duke; go for gold!" £1.8 million (Note: £1.8 million was equivalent to £200 million in 2025 terms in 1832.) was withdrawn from the Bank of England in the first days of the run (a quarter of the £7 million (Note: £7 million was equivalent to £700 million in 2025 terms in 1832.) in the bank's possession).

King William recalled Lord Grey to the post of prime minister and consented to create enough Whig peers to force the bill through the Lords. To avoid the appointment of Liberal peers, Wellington circulated a letter among Tory peers, encouraging them to desist from opposition, and warning them of the consequences of continuing. Enough Tory peers relented. By abstaining from subsequent votes, they allowed the legislation to pass in the House of Lords, and the Crown did not feel it needed to appoint additional peers.

The Reform Act received royal assent on 7 June 1832, thereby becoming law.

== Results ==
=== Historiography ===
The extensive scholarship on the Reform Act is filled with debates over its causes, nature, and impact. Historians have long grappled with whether it was a radical modernising movement that successfully introduced democracy or rather a conservative measure intended to preserve traditional upper class rule by making a few necessary concessions and thus blocking a revolution.

=== Provisions ===
==== Abolition of seats ====
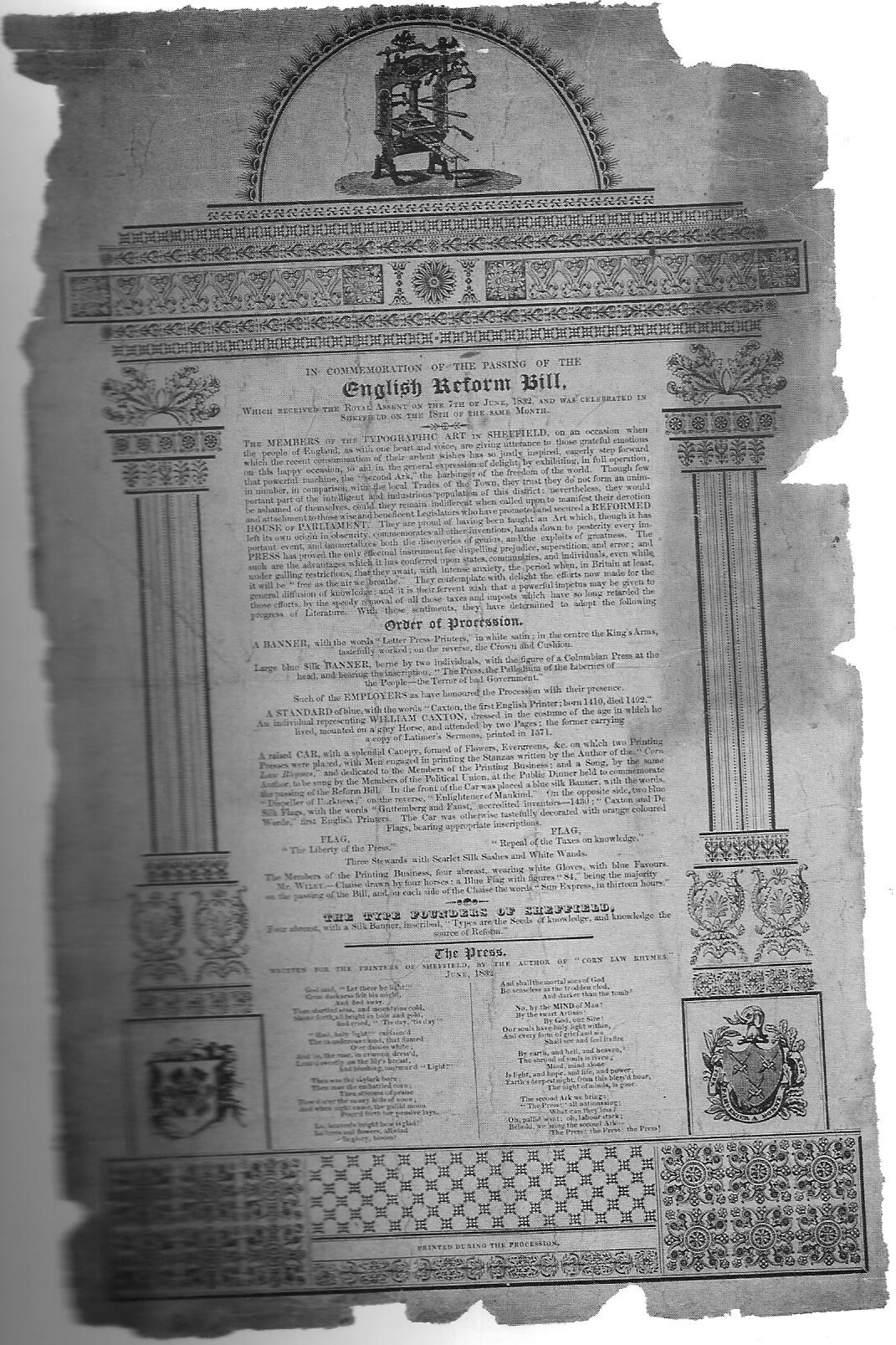
Poster issued by the Sheffield Typographical Society celebrating the passing of the Reform Act

The Reform Act's chief objective was the reduction of the number of nomination boroughs (election districts). There were 203 boroughs in England before the Act. (Note: Including Monmouth, considered part of Wales under sections 1, 20 and 269 of the Local Government Act 1972 (cap. 70). The Interpretation Act 1978 (cap. 30) provides that before 1 April 1974, "a reference to England includes Berwick-upon-Tweed and Monmouthshire".) The 56 smallest of these, as measured by their housing stock and tax assessments, were completely abolished. The next 30 smallest boroughs each lost one of their two MPs. In addition Weymouth and Melcombe Regis's four members were reduced to two. Thus in total the Act abolished 143 borough seats in England (one of the boroughs to be completely abolished, Higham Ferrers, returned only a single MP).

==== Creation of new seats ====
In their place the Act created new districts and 130 new seats in England and Wales:

- 26 English counties were divided into two divisions with each division being represented by two members.
- 7 English counties and 3 Welsh counties each received an additional representative; each of the 7 English counties being represented by three members, each of the 3 Welsh counties being represented by two.
- Yorkshire, which was represented by four MPs before the Act, was given an extra two MPs (so that each of its three ridings was represented by two MPs).
- The Isle of Wight, heretofore part of Hampshire, received its own single representative member.
- 22 large towns were given two MPs.
- Another 21 towns (of which two were in Wales) were given one MP.

Thus 65 new county seats and 65 new borough seats were created in England and Wales. The total number of English members fell by 18 and the number in Wales increased by five. (Note: Wales did not lose any of its existing borough representatives because with the exception of Beaumaris and Montgomery these members represented groups of towns rather than an individual town. To enable Wales to retain all of its existing borough seats the Act therefore simply increased, where necessary, the number of towns in these groupings and created entirely new groupings for Beaumaris and Montgomery.) The boundaries of the new divisions and parliamentary boroughs were defined in a separate Act, the Parliamentary Boundaries Act 1832.

==== Extension of the franchise ====
In county constituencies, franchise rights were extended to copyholders and long-term (at least sixty years) leaseholders of land with at least £10 (Note: £10 was equivalent to £1,000 in 2025 terms in 1832.) annual value, medium-term (between twenty and sixty years) leaseholders of land with at least £50 annual value, and to tenants-at-will paying an annual rent of at least £50 (Note: £50 was equivalent to £4,800 in 2025 terms in 1832.). Annual value refers to the rent at which the land might reasonably be expected to be let from year to year. (The franchise rights of 40 shilling freeholders were retained.)

The property qualifications of borough franchise were standardised to male occupants of property who paid a yearly rental of £10 or more. The property could be a house, warehouse, counting-house, shop, or other building as long as it was occupied, and occupied for at least 12 months. Existing borough electors retained a lifetime right to vote, however they had qualified, provided they were resident in the boroughs in which they were electors. In those boroughs which had freemen electors, voting rights were to be enjoyed by future freemen as well, provided their freemanship was acquired through birth or apprenticeship and they too were resident. (Note: Immediately after 1832, more than a third of borough electors—over 100,000—were "ancient right" electors, the greater proportion being freemen. Their numbers dwindled by death, and by 1898 apparently only one ancient right "potwalloper" remained a registered elector.)

The Act also introduced a system of voter registration, to be administered by the overseers of the poor in every parish and township. It instituted a system of special courts to review disputes relating to voter qualifications. It also authorised the use of multiple polling places within the same constituency, and limited the duration of polling to two days. (Formerly, polls could remain open for up to fifteen days.)

=== Effects ===
Between 1835 and 1841, local Conservative Associations began to educate citizens about the party's platform and encouraged them to register to vote annually, as required by the Act. Coverage of national politics in the local press was joined by in-depth reports on provincial politics in the national press. Grassroots Conservatives therefore saw themselves as part of a national political movement during the 1830s.

The size of the pre-Reform electorate is difficult to estimate. Voter registration was lacking, and many boroughs were rarely contested in elections. It is estimated that immediately before the Reform Act 1832, 400,000 English citizens (people who lived in the country) were entitled to vote, and that after passage, the number rose to 650,000, an increase of more than 60%. Rodney Mace estimates that before, 1 per cent of the population could vote and that the Reform Act only extended the franchise to 7 per cent of the population.

Tradesmen, such as shoemakers, mistakenly believed that the Reform Act had given them the vote. One example is the shoemakers of Duns, Berwickshire. They created a banner celebrating the Reform Act which declared, "The battle's won. Britannia's sons are free." This banner is on display at the People's History Museum in Manchester.

Many major commercial and industrial cities became separate parliamentary boroughs under the act. The new constituencies saw party conflicts within the middle class, and between the middle class and working class. A study of elections in the medium-sized borough of Halifax, 1832–1852, concluded that the party organisations, and the voters themselves, depended heavily on local social relationships and local institutions. Having the vote encouraged many men to become much more active in the political, economic and social sphere.

The Scottish Act revolutionised politics in Scotland, with its population of 2 million. Its electorate had been only 0.2% of the population compared to 4% in England. The Scottish electorate overnight soared from 5,000 to 65,000, or 13% of the adult men, and was no longer a private preserve of a few very rich families.

According to Thomas Ertman, the act was a "critical juncture" in British politics, as it "put an end to executive control of the legislature through pocket boroughs and placemen and ushered in a culture of national political participation; second, it brought forth a new source of order in politics, a two-party system built around religious cleavages; and finally, it acted as both an impetus and a model for future electoral expansions (1867, 1884, 1918)."

==== Tenant voters ====
Most of the pocket boroughs abolished by the Reform Act belonged to the Tory party. These losses were somewhat offset by the extension of the vote to tenants-at-will paying an annual rent of £50. This clause, proposed by the Tory Marquess of Chandos, was adopted in the House of Commons despite opposition from the Government. The tenants-at-will thereby enfranchised typically voted as instructed by their landlords, who in turn normally supported the Tory party. This concession, together with the Whig party's internal divisions and the difficulties faced by the nation's economy, allowed the Tories under Sir Robert Peel to make gains in the elections of 1835 and 1837, and to retake the House of Commons in 1841.

A modern historian, David F. Krein's examination of votes in the House concluded that the traditional landed interest "suffered very little" by the 1832 act. They continued to dominate the Commons, while losing some of their power to enact laws that focused on their more parochial interests. By contrast, the same study concluded that the Reform Act 1867 caused serious erosion of their legislative power and the 1874 elections saw great landowners losing their county seats to the votes of tenant farmers in England and especially in Ireland.

=== Limitations ===
The property qualifications of the Reform Act were substantial at the time and barred most of the working class from the vote. This created division between the working class and the middle class and led to the growth of the Chartist Movement.

Although it did disenfranchise most rotten boroughs, a few remained, such as Totnes in Devon and Midhurst in Sussex. Also, bribery of voters remained a problem. As Sir Thomas Erskine May observed, "it was too soon evident, that as more votes had been created, more votes were to be sold".

The Reform Act strengthened the House of Commons by reducing the number of nomination boroughs controlled by peers. Some aristocrats complained that, in the future, the government could compel them to pass any bill, simply by threatening to swamp the House of Lords with new peerages. The Duke of Wellington lamented: "If such projects can be carried into execution by a minister of the Crown with impunity, there is no doubt that the constitution of this House, and of this country, is at an end.... [T]here is absolutely an end put to the power and objects of deliberation in this House, and an end to all just and proper means of decision." The subsequent history of Parliament, however, shows that the influence of the Lords was largely undiminished. They compelled the Commons to accept significant amendments to the Municipal Reform Bill in 1835, forced compromises on Jewish emancipation, and successfully resisted several other bills supported by the public. It would not be until decades later, culminating in the Parliament Act 1911, that Wellington's fears would come to pass.

=== Further reform ===
During the ensuing years, Parliament adopted several more minor reforms. The Parliamentary Elections Act 1835 (for borough constituencies) and the Parliamentary Elections (No. 2) Act 1836 (for county constituencies) increased the number of polling places in each constituencies and thus reduced polling to a single day.

=== Repeal ===
The whole act was repealed by section 80(7) of, and the thirteenth schedule to, the Representation of the People Act 1948 (11 & 12 Geo. 6. c. 65), which came into force on 30 July 1948.

== See also ==
- 1832 United Kingdom general election
- Elections in the United Kingdom § History
- List of constituencies enfranchised and disfranchised by the Reform Act 1832
- Reform Acts, other legislation concerning electoral matters
- Scottish Reform Act 1832, enlarged the electorate by a factor of 13 from 5,000 to 65,000

== Bibliography ==
- Blackstone, William (1765). Commentaries on the Laws of England. Oxford: Clarendon Press.
- Gash, Norman (1952). Politics in the Age of Peel: A Study in the Technique of Parliamentary Representation, 1830–1850. London: Longmans, Green, and Co.
- Hilton, Boyd. A Mad, Bad, and Dangerous People?: England 1783–1846 (Oxford University Press, 2008) pp420-438. online
- Lady Holland; Austin, Sarah (1855). A Memoir of the Reverend Sydney Smith by his daughter, Lady Holland, with a Selection from his Letters edited by Mrs Sarah Austin (2 vols). London: Brown, Green, and Longmans.
- Marcus, Jane, ed. (2001). Suffrage and the Pankhursts. Women's Source Library. Vol. VIII. London: Routledge. ISBN 9780415256933.
- May, Thomas Erskine (1895). The Constitutional History of England Since the Accession of George the Third, 1760–1860. Vol. 1. pp. 263–364.
- Phillips, John A.; Wetherell, Charles (1995). "The Great Reform Act of 1832 and the Political Modernization of England". American Historical Review. 100 (2): 411–436. doi:10.2307/2169005. JSTOR 2169005.
- Rover, Constance (1967). Women's Suffrage and Party Politics in Britain, 1866–1914. London: Routledge & Kegan Paul.
- Rudé, George (1967). "English Rural and Urban Disturbances on the Eve of the First Reform Bill, 1830–1831". Past and Present (37): 87–102. doi:10.1093/past/37.1.87. JSTOR 650024.
- Smith, E. A. (1992). Reform or Revolution? A Diary of Reform in England, 1830-2. Stroud, Gloucestershire: Alan Sutton.
- Thorne, R. G. (1986). The House of Commons: 1790–1820. London: Secker and Warburg.
- Trevelyan, G. M. (1922). British History in the Nineteenth Century and After (1782–1901. London: Longmans, Green, and Co.
