= Wolseley =

Wolseley may refer to:British car/1940's

== People ==
- Wolseley (surname)
- Viscount Wolseley
- Wolseley baronets
- John Wolesely (born 1938), British-Australian artist who worked with Aboriginal Australian artist Mulkundick Wirrpanda

== Businesses ==
all taking their name from Frederick Wolseley (1837–1899)

- The Wolseley, a restaurant at 160 Piccadicky, London, in the former showroom of the Wolseley Motors building
- Wolseley UK, a building materials distributor, and its former affiliate, The Wolseley Sheep Shearing Machine Company, a defunct British manufacturer of sheep shearing machinery
- The Wolseley Tool and Motor Car Company, automobile manufacturer spun off to Vickers, Sons & Maxim renamed Wolseley Motors in 1914
  - Wolseley Motors, automobile manufacturer, owned in turn by Vickers, W R Morris, Morrick Motors, BMC and British Leyland

== Electorates ==
- Wolseley (Manitoba electoral district), provincial electorate in Manitoba
- Wolseley (Saskatchewan electoral district), former provincial electorate in Saskatchewan
- Qu'Appelle-Wolseley, former provincial electorate in Saskatchewan

== Settlements ==
- Rural Municipality of Wolseley No. 155, Saskatchewan, Canada
- Wolseley, Saskatchewan, a town within the rural municipality
- Wolseley, South Australia, a town and former railway junction
- Wolseley, Staffordshire, a village near Stafford and Rugeley
- Wolseley, Western Cape, a town in South Africa
- Wolseley, Winnipeg, Canada, a neighbourhood of Winnipeg, Manitoba

== Other locations ==
- Wolseley Battery, a coastal battery in Malta
- Wolseley Buttress, a place in Antarctica
- Wolseley River, a river in Ontario, Canada
- Wolseley Road, a residential street in Sydney, Australia
- Wolseley Hall, a demolished stately home in Staffordshire, England, subsequently the location of the Wolseley Centre
- Mount Wolseley, a mountain in New Zealand
