= Jane Stuart Woolsey =

1830-1891, nursing administrator, philanthropist, and author

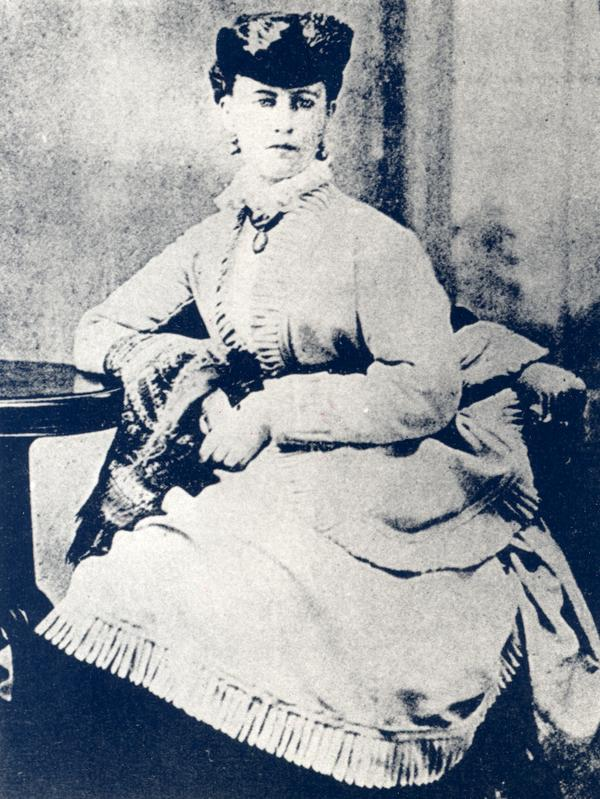
- Born: February 7, 1830
- Died: July 9, 1891 (aged 61); Matteawan, New York
- Occupation: Nurse
- Relatives: Georgeanna Woolsey (sister), Abby Howland Woolsey (sister)

Jane Stuart Woolsey (February 7, 1830 – July 9, 1891) was an American nursing administrator, philanthropist, and author. She worked in Union army hospitals during the American Civil War and wrote a memoir of the experience, Hospital Days.

== Early life ==
Woolsey was born on February 7, 1830, on a ship traveling from Connecticut to New York. She was one of eight children. The family members were Abolitionists.

== Career ==
Woolsey and several of her sisters became nurses. In 1863 Woolsey and her sister, Georgeanna, moved to Alexandria, Virginia to work at Fairfax Theological Seminary now Virginia Theological Seminary. The seminary was commandeered by the Union army as a hospital. Woolsey served as superintendent of nurses.

In 1868 she published her memoir Hospital days. In the book Woolsey recounts her experiences during the Civil War and advocates for formal training for nurses.

Following the end of the Civil War, Woolsey established an industrial school in Richmond, Virginia with the purpose of training Black women to be seamstresses. She was also involved with the Girls’ Industrial Department at the Hampton Agricultural and Industrial School. She then returned to New York to work at the Presbyterian Hospital in New York City. There she worked with her sister Abby.

Woolsey died on July 9, 1891, in Matteawan, New York.
