= Abby Howland Woolsey =

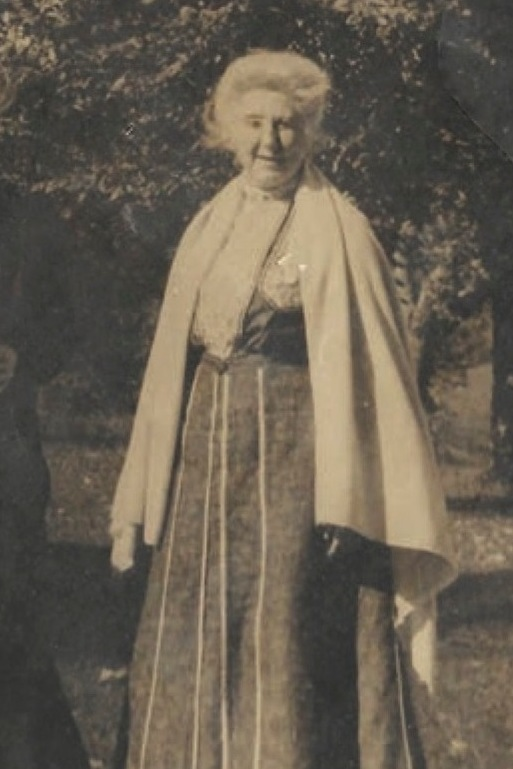
- Born: July 16, 1828; Alexandria
- Died: April 7, 1893 (aged 64); New York City
- Occupation: Social worker, writer, teacher, nurse
- Parent(s): Charles William Woolsey; Jane Eliza Newton Woolsey
- Relatives: Eliza Howland, Georgeanna Woolsey, Jane Stuart Woolsey, Mary Woolsey Howland

Abby Howland Woolsey (July 16, 1828 – April 7, 1893) was an American social worker and nursing educator.

Abby Howland Woolsey was born on July 16, 1828 in Alexandria, Virginia. She was the eldest of seven daughters and eight children of Charles William Woolsey, a prosperous sugar-refining businessman, and Jane Eliza Newton. She grew up mostly in Boston, Massachusetts, where she attended Misses Murdock's School. After the death of her father in the 1840 sinking of the Lexington, the family moved to New York City. Woolsey and her sisters attended Rutgers Female Institute and were sent to different finishing schools, with Woolsey and her sister Jane attending a school in New Rochelle, New York.

Woolsey chafed at traditional domestic roles of women at the time and became an ardent abolitionist after witnessing a slave auction in Charleston, South Carolina in 1859. She was active in the Dutch Reformed Market Street Church and worked as assistant manager of the New York House and School of Industry, a charity which taught poor women to work as seamstresses.

During the American Civil War, the Woolsey sisters contributed to the Union war effort. Eliza, Georgeanna, and Jane worked as nurses. Woolsey attended the founding meeting of the Woman's Central Association of Relief in 1861, headed by Dr. Elizabeth Blackwell. Woolsey supervised the collection, creation, and distribution of clothing and medical supplies, often purchasing them with her own money. Woolsey and her sisters also worked to get President Abraham Lincoln to appoint chaplains to Union Army hospitals.

After the Civil War, her sister Jane became resident director of the newly-opened Presbyterian Hospital in New York City in 1872. Jane appointed Abby Woolsey acting clerk, and together they organized the administration of the new hospital, with Abby filling in as director during Jane's absences. They left in 1876 due to Jane's frequent illnesses and the sexist response of male medical staff to a female administrator.

Abby Woolsey became a founding member of the New York State Charities Aid Association in 1872. Through her work there, she was chosen to draft the organizational plan for the Bellevue Hospital Training School for Nurses, the first American nursing school following the principals of Florence Nightingale. Opening in 1873 with six students, it graduated thousands of nurses until its closure in 1969. In 1876, she travelled to Europe on behalf of the organization to investigate nursing practices in England, France, Germany, Switzerland, Russia, and Italy. Her resulting report, published as A Century of Nursing (1876), was called "the ablest and most valued publications of her time on the subject of trained nursing." She also authored other reports including Lunacy Legislation in England (1884).

Abby Woolsey lived with her sister Jane and was her caretaker until the latter's death in 1891. She herself died in 1893 of nephritis and heart disease at the age of 61.
