= Birmingham Political Union =

Birmingham grass-roots democracy pressure group

- Abbreviation: BPU
- Founder: Thomas Attwood
- Founded: 1829
- Dissolved: April 1839
- Headquarters: Birmingham
- Ideology: Chartism
- Political position: Left-wing

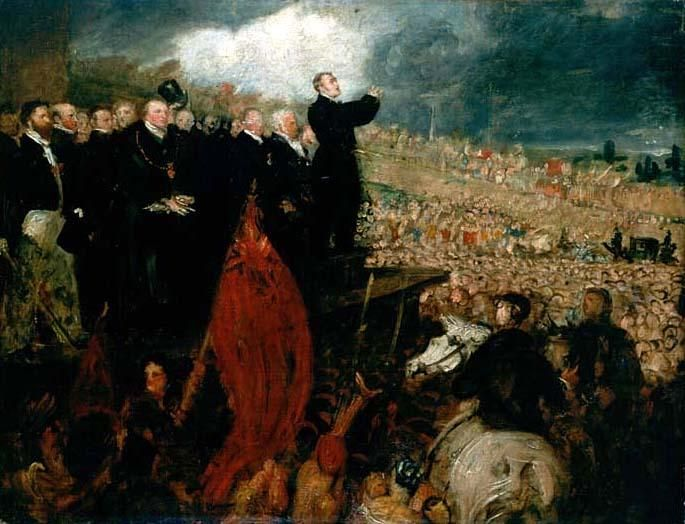
The meeting of the Birmingham Political Union on 16 May 1832, attended by 200,000, painted by Benjamin Haydon

The Birmingham Political Union (General Political Union) was a grass roots pressure group in Great Britain during the 1830s. It was founded by Thomas Attwood, a banker interested in monetary reform. Its platform called for extending and redistributing suffrage rights to the working class, of the kind set out in the Reform Bill of March 1831 which when passed became the Reform Act 1832. It included both middle-class and working-class members.

== Early years ==
The Union was founded at the end of 1829; its first public meeting was on 25 January 1830 and was attended by a large number of people, variously estimated as anywhere between 10,000 and 15,000 people. Its stated aim was to campaign for reform of the House of Commons, politically combining "the efforts of the two "industrious classes" of the nation, that is, the middle and lower… who had been deceived into attacking and blaming each other for their sufferings".

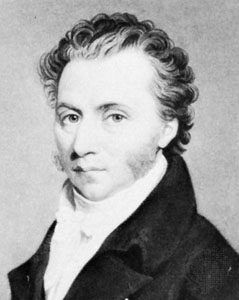
Thomas Attwood.

Other manufacturing towns in Britain began to follow Birmingham's example and over 100 Political Unions were formed.The Birmingham Political Union was looked upon as a model ‘due to its size, its good organisation, its unified class structure and Attwood’s articulate and sincere leadership’. The Political Unions' demands were:

- Widening the right to vote to include all men who paid taxes;
- Shorter term Parliaments – with the aim of increasing MPs' accountability to their constituents;
- The abolition of property qualifications for MPs and the introduction of payment of MPs – since the system in place at the time meant that only rich people could afford to become MPs.

== Methods ==
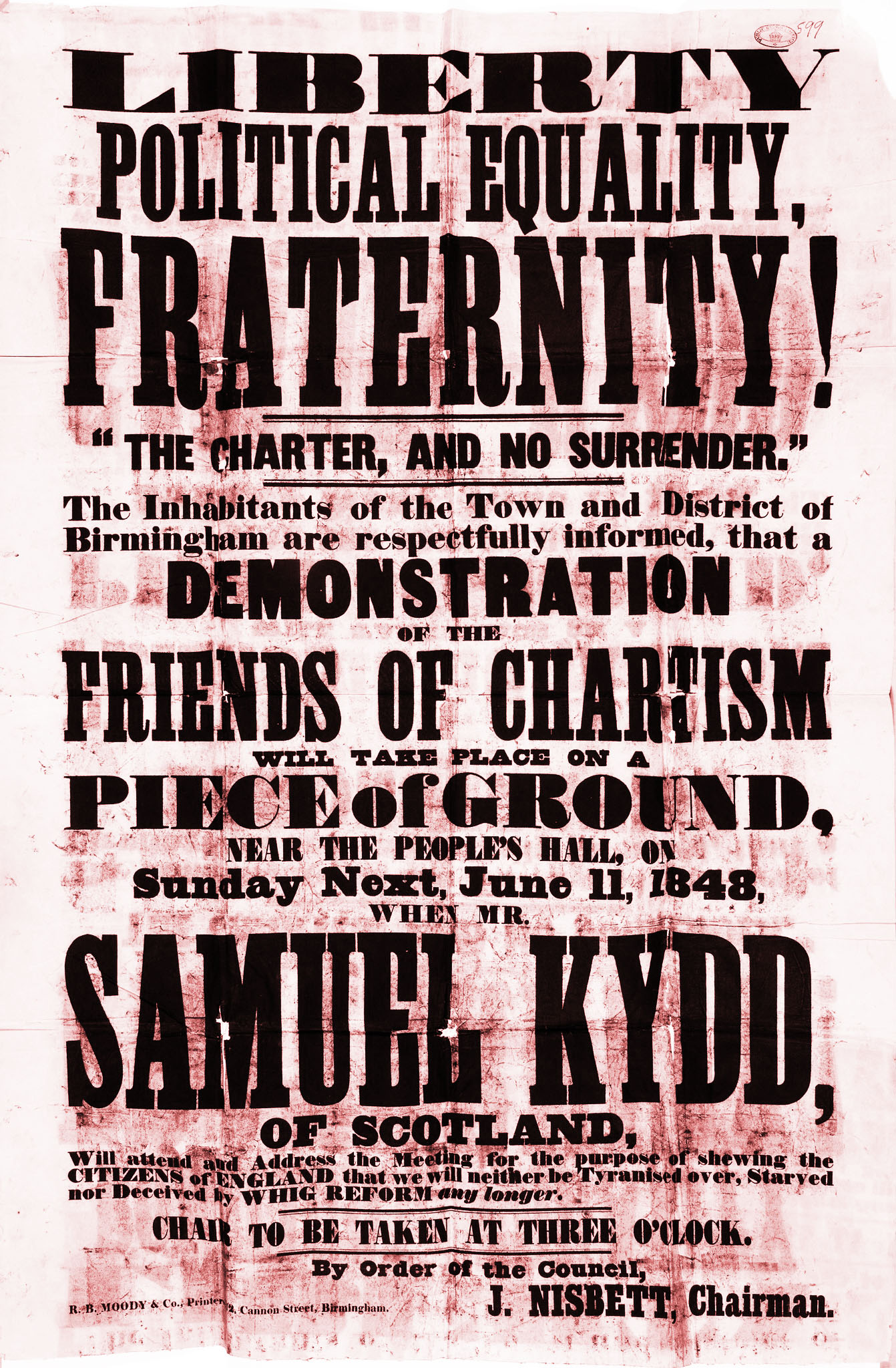
A flyer used to organise Chartist meetings.

Unlike some other radical political organisations of the period, the Birmingham Political Union used mainly law-abiding, non-violent methods. However, the organisation had a large membership, and the government of the time feared the consequences if it took up arms; during the Days of May in 1832, when 200,000 people attended a meeting of the Union, rumours that the Union would take up arms contributed to the pressure on the House of Lords to pass the 1832 Reform Act.

== Later ==
After the successful passage of the Reform Act, the Birmingham Political Union disbanded. The Union’s working class supporters "felt betrayed and frustrated by the Reform Act's failure to give them the vote". The proceedings of the fourth annual meeting of the Union in September 1833 show clear signs of this frustration: "The Council are...compelled to acknowledge that the Reformed Parliament has disappointed the expectation of the people...The Reform Bill has had its trial, but what has been the fruit which it has produced?". The Union demands would soon thereafter be picked up in the six points of the People’s Charter.

Although there were attempts to get it going again in relation to various campaigns, in April 1839 the Union's council was suspended indefinitely.

== See also ==
- National Political Union
- Peel's Bill
- Days of May
