= Wolseley baronets =

Baronetcy in the Baronetage of England

There have been two baronetcies created for members of the Wolseley family, one in the Baronetage of England and one in the Baronetage of Ireland. As of 2018, the Wolseley Baronetcy of Mount Wolseley is dormant.

== History ==
The Wolseleys of Staffordshire (and later, Ireland) are an ancient family whose record goes back a thousand years, to Sewardus, Lord Wisele, and are descended from Edward III. Ralph Wolseley served as Baron of the Exchequer for Edward IV.

=== Wolseley baronets (1628 creation) ===
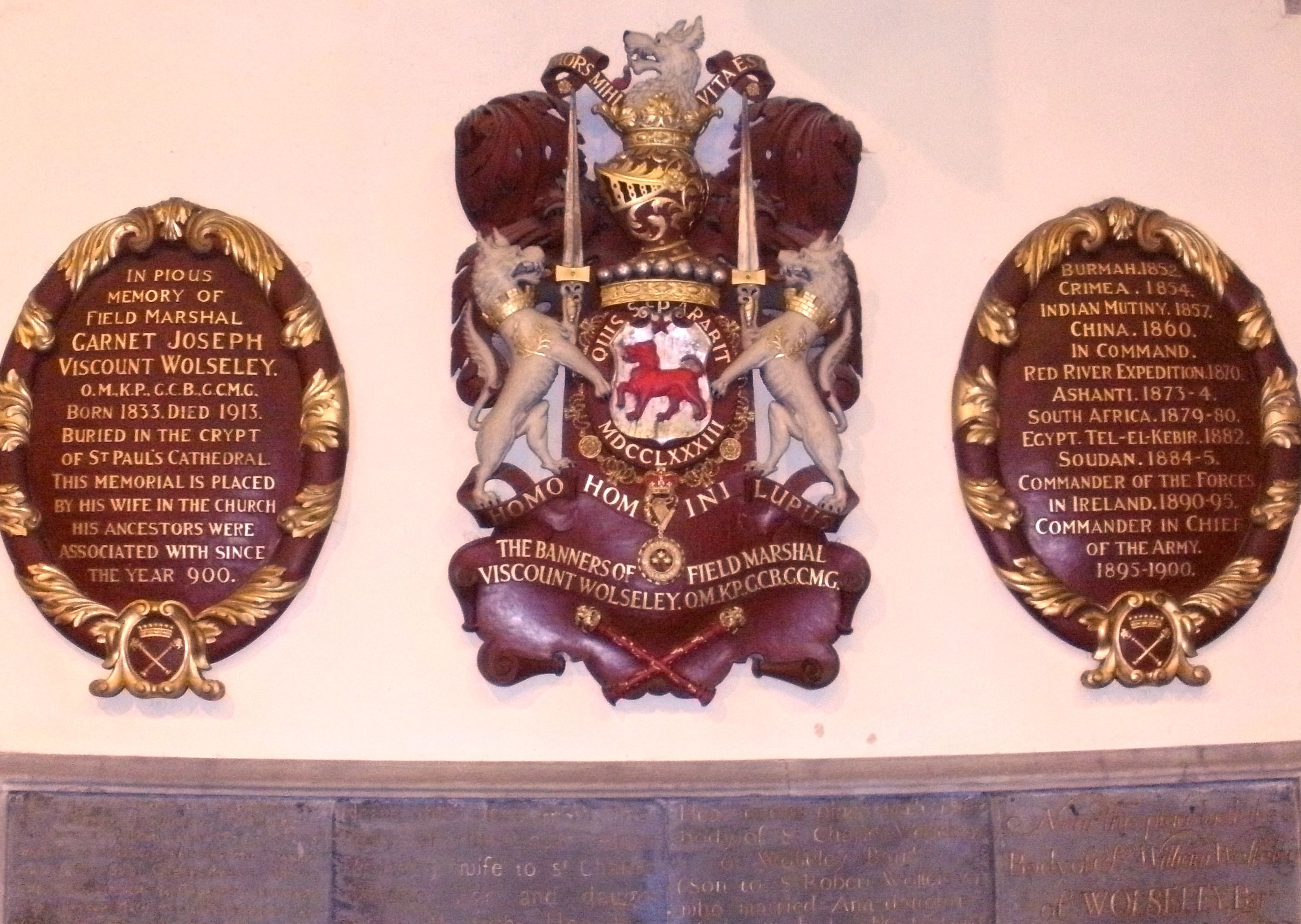
Wolseley memorials at St Michael and All Angels Church in Colwich, Staffordshire

The Wolseley Baronetcy, of Wolseley in the County of Stafford, was created in the Baronetage of England on 24 November 1628 for Robert Wolseley, the member of an ancient Staffordshire family and a Colonel in Charles I's army. The second Baronet represented Oxfordshire, Staffordshire and Stafford in the House of Commons and was a member of Oliver Cromwell's House of Lords. The sixth Baronet was a Gentleman of the Privy Chamber to King George III.

Many members of the Wolseleys of Wolseley Hall are buried at St Michael and All Angels Church in Colwich, a short distance from Shugborough Hall. Inside the church are many tombs, wall tablets and other memorials connected with the landed gentry in the parish. A tablet also commemorates Field Marshal Garnet Wolseley, 1st Viscount Wolseley, KP, GCB, OM, GCMG, VD, PC (1833–1913), a distant relative of the Wolseleys of Wolseley Hall who is buried in the crypt of St Paul's Cathedral, London.

Wolseley Hall, the family seat, was at Wolseley Park near Rugeley, Staffordshire. The old house was demolished in 1954 and the commercial ventures of the 11th Baronet created financial difficulties which led to the enforced sale of the estate in 1996.

=== Wolseley baronets (1745 creation) ===
The Wolseley Baronetcy, of Mount Wolseley in the County of Carlow, was created in the Baronetage of Ireland on 19 January 1745 for Richard Wolseley, who sat as a member of the Irish House of Commons for Carlow. He was the younger brother of the fifth Baronet of the 1628 creation. Consequently, the holder of the baronetcy is also in remainder to the Wolseley Baronetcy of Wolseley.

As of 7 May 2018, there is "no clear or undisputed successor" to the baronetcy according to the Standing Council of the Baronetage, with the title having sat dormant since the death of the 12th Baronet in 1991. The most senior known heir is James Douglas Wolseley (born 1937) of Texas.

The family seat was Mount Wolseley House, near Tullow, County Carlow.

== Holders of the titles ==
=== Wolseley baronets (1628 creation) ===
Arms of Wolseley baronets, of Wolseley: Argent, a talbot passant gules

- Sir Robert Wolseley, 1st Baronet (c. 1587–1646)
- Sir Charles Wolseley, 2nd Baronet (c. 1630–1714)
- Sir William Wolseley, 3rd Baronet (c. 1660–1728)
- Sir Henry Wolseley, 4th Baronet (died 1730)
- Sir William Wolseley, 5th Baronet (died 1779)
- Sir William Wolseley, 6th Baronet (1740–1817)
- Sir Charles Wolseley, 7th Baronet (1769–1846)
- Sir Charles Wolseley, 8th Baronet (1813–1854)
- Sir Charles Michael Wolseley, 9th Baronet (1846–1931)
- Sir Edric Charles Joseph Wolseley, 10th Baronet (1886–1954)
- Sir Charles Garnet Richard Mark Wolseley, 11th Baronet (1944–2018)
- Sir Stephen Garnet Hugo Charles Wolseley, 12th Baronet (born 1980)

=== Wolseley baronets (1745 creation) ===
Arms of Wolseley Baronets, of Mount Wolseley: Argent, a talbot passant gules, a crescent, for difference

- Sir Richard Wolseley, 1st Baronet (1696–1769)
- Sir Richard Wolseley, 2nd Baronet (1729–1781)
- Sir William Wolseley, 3rd Baronet (1775–1819)
- Sir Richard Wolseley, 4th Baronet (1760–1852)
- Sir Clement Wolseley, 5th Baronet (1794–1857)
- Sir John Richard Wolseley, 6th Baronet (1834–1874)
- Sir Clement James Wolseley, 7th Baronet (1837–1889)
- Sir John Wolseley, 8th Baronet (1803–1890)
- Sir Capel Charles Wolseley, 9th Baronet (1870–1923)
- Sir Reginald Wolseley, 10th Baronet (1872–1933)
- Sir William Augustus Wolseley, 11th Baronet (1865–1950)
- Sir Garnet Wolseley, 12th Baronet (1915–1991), a cobbler, son of Richard Bingham Wolseley (1853–1938), of Wallasey, Cheshire, a descendant of the 1st Baronet.
- James Douglas Wolseley, possible 13th Baronet (born 1937), son of James Douglas Wolseley (1903–1960), of Fort Worth, Texas, U.S.A., a descendant of the 1st Baronet, third cousin once removed of the 12th Baronet, and Olive, daughter of Carroll Walter Wofford.

=== Lines of succession ===
Lines of succession to both Baronetcies
- Sir Robert Wolseley, of Wolseley, 1st Baronet (1587—1646)
  - Sir Charles Wolseley, 2nd Baronet (d. 1714) Cromwellite Lord Wolseley in the Other House
    - Sir William Wolseley, 3rd Baronet (d. 1728)
    - Sir Henry Wolseley, 4th Baronet (d. c. 1730)
    - Richard Wolseley (d. 1724)
      - Sir William Wolseley, 5th Baronet (c. 1692—1779)
        - Sir William Wolseley, 6th Baronet (1740—1817)
          - Sir Charles Wolseley, 7th Baronet (1769—1846)
            - Sir Charles Wolseley, 8th Baronet (1813—1854)
              - Sir Charles Michael Wolseley, 9th Baronet (1846—1931)
                - Sir Edric Charles Joseph Wolseley, 10th Baronet (1886—1954)
                  - Stephen Garnet Hubert Francis Wolseley (1918—1944)
                    - Sir Charles Garnet Richard Mark Wolseley, 11th Baronet (1944—2018)
                      - Sir Stephen Garnet Hugo Charles Wolseley, 12th Baronet (born 1980)
                        - (1) Nicholas William Garnet Wolseley (b. 2010)
                        - (2) Patrick Anthony Charles Wolseley (b. 2014)
                  - Richard Edric Vincent Wolseley (1928—1991)
                    - (3) Stephen Richard Dulany Wolseley (b. 1954)
                    - (4) Christopher Michael Garnet Wolseley (b. 1956)
                - William Ralph Joseph Wolseley (1887—1977)
                  - Robert William Hargreaves Wolseley (1924—1998)
                    - (5) Alistair Robert Hargreaves Wolseley (b. 1969)
              - Edward Talbot Wolseley (1848—1935)
                - Charles Joseph Wolseley (1877—1933)
                  - (6) Charles Edward Peter Wolseley (b. 1913)
      - Sir Richard Wolseley, of Mount Wolseley, 1st Baronet (1696—1769)
        - Sir Richard Wolseley, 2nd Baronet (1729—1781)
          - Sir William Wolseley, 3rd Baronet (1775—1819)
        - Colonel Clement Wolseley (d. 1811)
          - Reverend Sir Richard Wolseley, 4th Baronet (1760—1852)
          - Major John Rogerson Wolseley
            - Sir Clement Wolseley, 5th Baronet (1794—1857)
              - Sir John Richard Wolseley, 6th Baronet (1834—1874)
              - Sir Clement James Wolseley, 7th Baronet (1837—1889)
          - Arthur Wolseley (d. 1842)
            - Very Rev. Sir John Wolseley, 8th Baronet, Dean of Kildare (1803—1890)
        - Reverend William Wolseley (d. 1800)
          - Reverend William Wolseley
            - Venerable Cadwallader Wolseley (1806—1872)
              - Major William Charles Wolseley (1834—1878)
                - Sir Capel Charles Wolseley, 9th Baronet (1870—1923)
              - Cadwallader Brooke Wolseley (1845—1884)
                - Sir Reginald Beatty Wolseley, 10th Baronet (1872—1933)
            - Charles Wolseley (1809—1889)
              - Rev. Sir William Augustus Wolseley, 11th Baronet (1865—1950)
          - John Rogerson Wolseley (1777—1857)
            - Robert Brown Wolseley (1809—1858)
              - Richard Bingham Wolseley (1853—1938)
                - Sir Garnet Wolseley, 12th Baronet (1915—1991)
          - Major Garnet Joseph Wolseley (1778—1840)
            - Field Marshal Garnet Joseph Wolseley, 1st Viscount Wolseley (1833—1913)
              - Frances Garnet Wolseley, 2nd Viscountess Wolseley (1872—1936)
          - Major Robert Benjamin Wolseley (1790—1870)
            - Reverend Robert Warren Wolseley (1823—1909)
              - Robert Warren St. John Wolseley (1848—1910)
                - Douglas St. John Wolseley (1875—1943)
                  - James Douglas Wolseley (1903—1960)
                    - (7) Sir James Douglas Wolseley, 13th Baronet (born 1937)
              - Garnet Ruskin Wolseley (1884—1967)
                - (8) John Walter Wolseley (b. 1938)
                  - (9) William Wolseley (b. 1967)
                  - (10) Thomas Wolseley (b. 1969)
