= Wolsey (surname) =

Wolsey is an English surname. Notable people with the surname include:

- Allan Wolsey Cardinall (1887–1956), British colonial administrator
- Carleton Wolsey Washburne (1889–1968), American educator
- Daniel Wolsey Voorhees (1827–1897), American lawyer and politician
- Elisha Wolsey Peck (1799–1888), American chief justice
- Henry Wolsey Bayfield (1795–1885), British naval officer and surveyor
- Laurence Wolsey (born 1945), Belgian-English mathematician
- Louis Wolsey (1877–1953), American rabbi
- Thomas Wolsey (1473–1530), English statesman and cardinal
- William Wolsey, Protestant martyr

== See also ==
- Woolsey (surname)
- Wolseley (surname)
