= William Hulbert Wolseley =

William Hulbert Wolseley (16 June 1821 – 9 May 1899) was an Irish Anglican priest: the Archdeacon of Kilfenora from 1885 until his death.

Wolseley was born in County Sligo and educated at Trinity College Dublin He was ordained deacon in 1847 and priest in 1848. He was the Vicar of Kilrush from 1862; and Prebendary of Inishcaltra in Killaloe Cathedral from 1864.
