= USS Woolsey =

USS Woolsey has been the name of two ships in the United States Navy.

The first was named in honor of Commodore Melancthon Taylor Woolsey, and the second commemorated both him and his son, Commodore Melancthon Brooks Woolsey.

- USS Woolsey (DD-77) was a Wickes-class destroyer in World War I.
- USS Woolsey (DD-437) was a Gleaves-class destroyer in World War II.
