= Sir Reginald Wolseley, 10th Baronet =

Sir Reginald Wolseley Bt
- Born: 31 January 1872
- Died: 10 July 1933 (aged 61)
- Education: Bedford Modern School
- Known for: Eccentricity; 10th Baronet of Mount Wolseley

Sir Reginald Beatty Wolseley, 10th Baronet (31 January 1872 – 10 July 1933), known as Dick Wolseley, was an Anglo-Irish Baronet of Mount Wolseley in County Carlow, Ireland. He left Britain as a young man, became an elevator operator at a hotel in Waterloo, Iowa, and preferred to remain an obscure exile even after succeeding to the title.

== Early years ==
Reginald Beatty Wolseley was born on 31 January 1872 in Dunfanaghy, County Donegal, the son of Cadwallader Brooke Wolseley (1845–1884), a physician and surgeon, and Katie Maria (née Beatty). His grandfather was the Ven. Cadwallader Wolseley, Archdeacon of Glendalough.

Wolseley grew up in a household of servants and maids in Northwich, Cheshire, England, was a cousin of Admiral Earl Beatty, and was educated privately at Bedford Modern School. He was the three-times great-grandson of William Wolseley, who was the third son of the first baronet. He had three sisters: Winifred, Ethel and Honoria, who married Col. William Davenport Crawley Kelly.

== America ==
Arms of the Wolseley Baronets of Mount Wolseley

The young Wolseley emigrated to the United States in 1894, eventually becoming an elevator operator in a hotel in Waterloo, Iowa. In 1923, his first cousin, Sir Capel Charles Wolseley, the 9th Baronet, died without an heir at age 53, after being struck by a car while cycling. As the nearest male relative in line to the baronetcy, Reginald, therefore, succeeded to the title.

However, he preferred to keep his title secret and stay in Iowa, where he was simply known as Dick, continuing to work in the elevator. He later attributed his failure to obtain a more suitable position to poor feet, commenting "I might have been a go-getter but my poor feet wouldn't stand any rushing about".

== Family matters ==
In May 1930, Wolseley's secret came out. His mother's dying wish was for her nurse, Marion Elizabeth Baker, to visit Sir Reginald and persuade him to return to England. A day after she arrived in Waterloo, Sir Reginald, then 58, married Baker, a lady eighteen years his junior. The day after the wedding, the new Lady Wolseley returned to England on the express understanding that Sir Reginald would follow after he had "straightened up his elevator affairs". Unfortunately for his wife, Sir Reginald was "too attached to his lift and refused to budge"; he obtained a divorce on the grounds that his wife "harassed him" with telegrams urging him to return to England. Undaunted, his ex-wife returned to Iowa to try again to persuade him to leave. She achieved this in January 1932 when the divorce was set aside, and Sir Reginald and his wife set sail for England, settling in Berrynarbor, North Devon.

Sir Reginald died in Devon in 1933, age 60. His cousin William Augustus Wolseley succeeded as the 11th baronet.

Baronetage of Ireland
Preceded by Capel Wolseley	Baronet (of Mount Wolseley); 1923–1933	Succeeded by William Wolseley
