= National Political Union (England) =

The National Political Union (NPU) was an organisation set up in October 1831, after the rejection of the Reform Bill by the House of Lords, to serve as a pressure group for parliamentary reform: “to support the King and his ministers against a small faction in accomplishing their great measure of Parliamentary Reform”.

Modelled by Francis Place on the influential Birmingham Political Union, (but without its emphasis on currency reform) the NPU was meant to serve both as a co-ordinating body for the country's political unions, and as a particular outlet for London radicals.

== Controversies, effects, and demise ==
The NPU was involved in controversy from its very outset, when the constituting meeting was invaded by a working-class protest against its middle-class membership: agreement on a moderate policy, but with half the council seats reserved for manual workers, meant that the body would continue thereafter as a moderate centre of focus for both the middle and working classes of London. A month later, a government ban on umbrella organisations effectively put paid to the NPU's hopes of replacing the Birmingham Political Union as a nationwide co-ordinating body; and in the New Year it found itself divided again on the question of whether to urge the government onwards with reform, or simply express support for the Whig ministry, as its President, Sir Francis Burdett, preferred.

It was only after the dismissal of the Whig ministers, when the so-called Days of May protests against the forming of a Tory administration began, that the NPU came into its own, with a major influx of members, and of finance. A series of co-ordinated measures – a petition to the Commons for the withholding of the budget; public meetings against reaction; and an organised run on the Bank of England's gold – helped provide that “pressure from without” to which Earl Grey attributed much of the eventual success of the Whig Bill.

Thereafter however, after a brief attempt by the NPU to organise support for liberal candidates at the 1832 election, a collapse in both membership and finances took place, its very success leading to the undoing of the essentially single-issue body.

== See also ==
- Chartism
- Joseph Parkes
- London Corresponding Society
- National Reform Union
- Thomas Attwood
- William Johnson Fox
