= John M. Woolsey Jr. =

American lawyer

John M. Woolsey Jr. (22 April 1916 – 8 January 2005) was an American attorney in Boston, Massachusetts.

Woolsey graduated from Yale College in 1938 and Yale Law School in 1941. During World War II, he was a Lieutenant (jg) in the U.S. Naval Reserve, where he served in the Office of Naval Intelligence in Washington, 1942–1945. He was assigned by the Navy to Justice Robert H. Jackson's staff at the Nuremberg Trials prosecuting Nazi war criminals. At the trial, he worked on the prosecution brief regarding aggressive war against Czechoslovakia and Poland, work for which he received Czechoslovakia's Order of the White Lion. He then joined the Boston law firm of Herrick, Smith, Donald, Farley & Ketchum (later Herrick & Smith). He remained at Herrick & Smith for all of his active professional career. After his retirement in 1984, he became 'of counsel' for the Boston law firm of Palmer & Dodge LLC.

He participated in many community organizations in the Boston area and was a lifelong conservationist. From 1950 on, he was involved with The Trustees of Reservations, for which he served as President 1977–1980. He also worked with the Massachusetts Audubon Society and several land trusts. He was a member of the American Antiquarian Society.

His father John M. Woolsey was a noted U.S. Federal district judge, best known for his 1933 decision lifting the U.S. government's ban on James Joyce's Ulysses.
