= Georgeanna Woolsey =

American author and nurse (1833–1906)

Georgeanna Muirson Woolsey Bacon
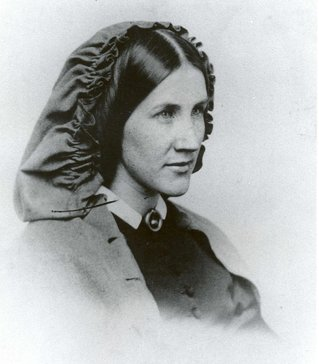
- Born: Georgeanna Muirson Woolsey; November 5, 1833; Brooklyn, New York
- Died: January 27, 1906 (aged 72); New Haven, Connecticut
- Other name: Georgy Woolsey
- Occupations: Author, nurse
- Known for: nursing career during the American Civil War, wartime memoirs and correspondence

Georgeanna Muirson Woolsey Bacon (often shorted to Georgeanna Woolsey or Georgy Woolsey) (1833–1906) was an American author and nurse. She is most notable for her nursing activities during the American Civil War and for her personal correspondence during the conflict.

== Description ==
Woolsey was born in New York in 1833. According to one source, she spent some time in the American South during her childhood and also in Boston. A staunch opponent of slavery, Woolsey volunteered as a nurse soon after the outbreak of the American Civil War in 1861. Georgeanna was not the only member of the Woolsey family to participate in the war; her brother John joined the Union army as a cavalry officer, while her three sisters and mother also worked as nurses during the conflict.

As a nurse, Woolsey first joined the Woman's Central Association of Relief of New York, and was soon assigned to Georgetown Hospital in Washington D.C. She would work at the hospital for two years, and also worked aboard hospital ships during the 1862 Peninsula Campaign. She also worked at Lovell Hospital in Rhode Island, and would be present near a number of battlefields, including Fredericksburg, Chancellorsville and Gettysburg. At Gettysburg, Georgeanna played a role in organizing efforts to treat the large number of casualties from the battle, and within the month two trains full of wounded treated by the Sanitary Commission nurses were departing per day. Inspired by her experiences at Gettysburg, Woolsey wrote a memoir titled Three Weeks in Gettysburg, which was so well received that the United States Sanitary Commission ordered 10000 copies be printed and distributed to raise support for the war nurses. Woolsey would continue to work as a nurse during the Eastern campaigns of 1864 and 1865, eventually working as a nurse in Richmond after the Confederate capital had been captured. Towards the end of the conflict, Woolsey fell seriously ill; she survived her illness and was able to attend the Grand Review of the Armies, but was left in a weakened state.

In the postwar years, Woolsey and her sister Eliza authored Letters of a Family, a volume of correspondence on the war that would later become widely cited. In 1869, she married Dr. Francis Bacon, a family friend and surgeon who had served in the Union army during the war. The couple resided in New Haven, Connecticut, where Woolsey became a co-founder of the Connecticut Children's Aid Society and the Connecticut Training School for Nurses. Woolsey died in January 1906.
