= Sir Charles Wolseley, 7th Baronet =

Sir Charles Wolseley, 7th Baronet (20 July 1769 - 3 October 1846) was one of the Wolseley baronets of Staffordshire, distinguished as an active proponent of parliamentary reform.

== Suffrage ==
In 1819 Wolseley, who as a young man reputedly participated in the storming of the Bastille in Paris, was elected as Birmingham's "legislatorial representative" by a large pro-reform rally of the town's enfranchised citizens. In 1820 he was imprisoned on a sedition and conspiracy charge, for 18 months.

In 1821, he was one of "seven wise men" that John Cartwright proposed to Jeremy Bentham act as "Guardians of Constitutional Reform", their reports and observations to concern "the entire Democracy or Commons of the United Kingdom". In addition to Bentham and himself, the other names Cartwright proposed were Sir Francis Burdett, Rev. William Draper; George Ensor, Rev. Richard Hayes, Robert Williams, and Matthew Wood.

Baronetage of England
Preceded by John Richard Wolseley	Baronet (of Wolseley); 1837 – 1889	Succeeded by John Wolseley
