= Pink Floyd discography =

List of all musical compositions by Pink Floyd

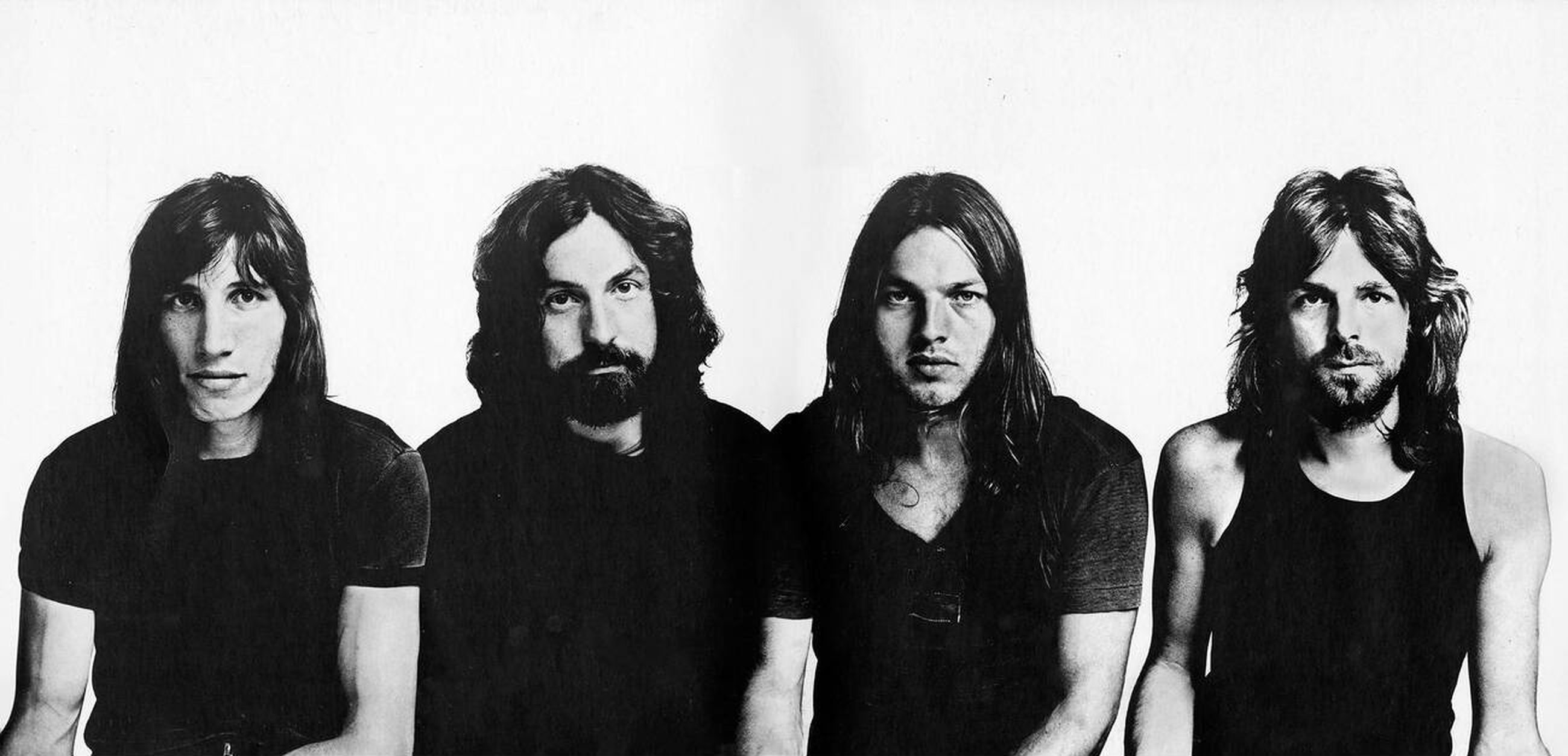
- Pink Floyd in the inner sleeve of Meddle (1971)
- Studio albums: 15
- Extended plays: 3
- Live albums: 8
- Compilation albums: 18
- Singles: 27
- Promotional singles: 2
- Box sets: 11

The discography of the English rock group Pink Floyd consists of 15 studio albums, seven live albums, 18 compilation albums, 11 box sets, three EPs, and 27 singles. Formed in 1965, Pink Floyd earned recognition for their psychedelic or space rock music, and, later, their progressive rock music. The group have sold over 250 million records worldwide, including 75 million in the United States.

Formed by guitarist and singer Syd Barrett, drummer Nick Mason, bassist and singer Roger Waters, and keyboardist and singer Richard Wright, Pink Floyd achieved success in London's underground music scene, led by Barrett. They signed a management deal with Peter Jenner and Andrew King (Blackhill Enterprises) in October 1966, and recorded a demo shortly afterwards to attract record label interest. In 1967, they signed with EMI Columbia and released their first single, "Arnold Layne", followed by the album The Piper at the Gates of Dawn.

Guitarist and singer David Gilmour was added as a fifth member at the end of 1967. Barrett left in 1968 following mental health and drug problems. Pink Floyd's second album, A Saucerful of Secrets, was the first of several to feature cover artwork by Hipgnosis. In 1969, Pink Floyd released a soundtrack album, More, and a combined live and studio album, Ummagumma. Atom Heart Mother (1970) was a collaboration with Ron Geesin, featuring an orchestra and choir. Meddle and the Obscured by Clouds soundtrack followed in 1971 and 1972.

Pink Floyd's eighth album, The Dark Side of the Moon (1973), sold more than 30 million copies and is one of the best-selling albums of all time. It has been reissued as a Quadrophonic LP and 5.1 surround sound Super Audio CD. The Dark Side of the Moon was followed by Wish You Were Here (1975), Animals (1977), and The Wall (1979); all except Animals reached number one in the US, and The Wall is the highest-certified multiple-disc album by the Recording Industry Association of America. Pink Floyd released few singles after Barrett's departure, though "Money" was a US top-20 hit, and "Another Brick in the Wall, Part 2" reached number one in the UK and US.

Waters became Pink Floyd's dominant force from 1972 onward, beginning with the compositions on The Dark Side of the Moon. He departed in 1985, declaring Pink Floyd "a spent force", and unsuccessfully sued to dissolve their partnership and retire the name. The remaining members, led by Gilmour, continued recording and touring as Pink Floyd, releasing A Momentary Lapse of Reason (1987), The Division Bell (1994) and The Endless River (2014).

In 2010, Pink Floyd sued EMI for unpaid royalties and for publishing their back catalogue on streaming services without their consent. A settlement was reached the following year, with the publication of the individual tracks on iTunes, and re-releases of The Dark Side of the Moon, Wish You Were Here, and The Wall. In 2016, Pink Floyd established a record label, Pink Floyd Records, and launched an extensive reissue programme of their work on vinyl and CD, and a box set The Early Years 1965–1972 containing a significant amount of previously unreleased material. In 2022, they released a one-off single, "Hey, Hey, Rise Up!", featuring the Ukrainian artist Andriy Khlyvnyuk, in protest of Russia's invasion of Ukraine. In 2024, the band sold their catalogue to Sony Music for $400 million.

== Artwork ==
Most Pink Floyd covers do not feature the band members, and many do not feature the band name or any text. Waters recommended Hipgnosis for A Saucerful of Secrets' cover, for which they were paid £110, and they went on to create many of the group's album packages. Ummagumma was the last to feature the group on the front cover, with a Droste effect created by multiple photographs, and a breakdown of their musical equipment on the back. Atom Heart Mother features a Friesian cow (named Lulubelle III) on the front cover, deliberately chosen as a reaction against the group's psychedelic image.

The cover of The Dark Side of the Moon was designed by Hipgnosis in collaboration with graphic designer George Hardie, and features a line drawing of light being refracted in a prism. The inner sleeve shows the graphic of a heartbeat, which can be heard at the start of the album. The original packaging also included additional posters and stickers. It has become one of the most recognisable rock album covers. The cover of Animals features an inflatable pig moored to Battersea Power Station that broke free and drifted into airspace. The Wall features a minimalist design on the front cover, while the inside sleeve shows cartoons of the principal characters in the story, both created by Gerald Scarfe. Hipgnosis's Storm Thorgerson returned to produce the cover for A Momentary Lapse of Reason, which featured a row of beds on Saunton Sands. For The Division Bell, he photographed two 3-metre (9.8 ft) high heads in style of Aku-Aku in a field near Ely, Cambridgeshire.

The CD packaging of the live album Pulse included a light-emitting diode on the spine, powered by batteries. This gave a visual "pulse" when the CD was stored on a shelf, with the battery expected to last up to a year. The compilation Echoes: The Best of Pink Floyd features a composite piece of artwork created by Hipgnosis combining several past album covers.

== Albums ==
=== Studio albums ===
List of studio albums, with selected chart positions, sales figures and certifications
Title	Album details	Peak chart positions										Sales	Certifications
Title	Album details	UK	AUS	AUT	CAN	FRA	GER	NLD	NZ	SWI	US	Sales	Certifications
The Piper at the Gates of Dawn	Released: 4 August 1967 (UK), 21 October 1967 (US); Label: Columbia (UK) Tower (US); Formats: CD, LP, CS, DL	6	—	—	—	15	42	46	—	87	131		BPI: Gold
A Saucerful of Secrets	Released: 28 June 1968 (UK), July 1968 (US); Label: Columbia (UK), Tower (US); Formats: CD, LP, CS, DL	9	—	—	—	10	57	—	—	—	158	FRA: 300,000	BPI: Gold
Soundtrack From The Film More	Released: 13 June 1969 (UK), September 1969 (US); Label: Harvest/Columbia (UK), Tower (US); Formats: CD, LP, CS, DL	9	—	—	—	2	74	14	—	—	153	FRA: 300,000	SNEP: Gold
Ummagumma (Note: Ummagumma consists of a live album (disc one) and a studio album (disc two).)	Released: 7 November 1969 (UK), 8 November 1969 (US); Label: Harvest/Columbia (UK), Harvest/EMI (US); Formats: CD, LP, CS, DL	5	—	—	78	10	25	5	—	—	74	FRA: 300,000	BPI: Gold; BVMI: Gold; RIAA: Platinum; SNEP: Gold
Atom Heart Mother	Released: 2 October 1970 (UK), 10 October 1970 (US); Label: Harvest/EMI; Formats: CD, LP, CS, DL	1	30	—	39	4	8	5	—	64	55		BPI: Gold; BVMI: Gold; IFPI AUT: Gold; RIAA: Gold; SNEP: Gold
Meddle	Released: 5 November 1971 (UK), October 1971 (US); Label: Harvest/EMI; Formats: CD, LP, CS, DL	3	24	69	51	7	11	2	—	76	70		BPI: Gold; BVMI: Gold; RIAA: 2× Platinum; SNEP: 2× Gold
Obscured by Clouds	Released: 2 June 1972 (UK), 15 June 1972 (US); Label: Harvest/EMI; Formats: CD, LP, CS, DL	6	44	—	32	1	19	3	—	—	46		BPI: Gold; RIAA: Gold
The Dark Side of the Moon	Released: 16 March 1973 (UK), 1 March 1973 (US); Label: Harvest/EMI (UK), Harvest/Capitol (US); Formats: CD, LP, CS, DL	2	2	1	1	1	3	2	1	5	1	UK: 4,114,000; AUS: 1,020,000	BPI: 16× Platinum; ARIA: 14× Platinum; BVMI: 3× Platinum; IFPI AUT: 4× Platinum; MC: 2× Diamond; RIAA: Diamond (15× Platinum); RMNZ: 19× Platinum; SNEP: Platinum
Wish You Were Here	Released: 12 September 1975; Label: Harvest/EMI (UK), Columbia (US); Formats: CD, LP, CS, DL	1	1	2	14	1	4	1	1	1	1	GER: 1,500,000	BPI: 3× Platinum; ARIA: 7× Platinum; BVMI: 2× Platinum; IFPI AUT: 2× Platinum; MC: 3× Platinum; RIAA: 7× Platinum; RMNZ: 4× Platinum; SNEP: Diamond
Animals	Released: 21 January 1977 (UK), 10 February 1977 (US); Label: Harvest/EMI (UK), Columbia (US); Formats: CD, LP, CS, DL, 8-track	2	3	2	12	1	1	1	1	1	3		BPI: Platinum; BVMI: Platinum; IFPI AUT: Gold; MC: 2× Platinum; RIAA: 4× Platinum; SNEP: Platinum
The Wall	Released: 30 November 1979 (UK), 8 December 1979 (US); Label: Harvest//EMI (UK), Columbia (US); Formats: CD, LP, CS, DL	3	1	1	1	1	1	1	1	1	1	AUS: 800,000	BPI: 3× Platinum; ARIA: 11× Platinum; BVMI: 7× Platinum; IFPI SWI: 3× Platinum; MC: 2× Diamond; NVPI: Platinum; RIAA: 2× Diamond (23× Platinum); RMNZ: 14× Platinum; SNEP: Diamond
The Final Cut	Released: 21 March 1983 (UK), 2 April 1983 (US); Label: Harvest/EMI (UK), Columbia (US); Formats: CD, LP, CS, DL	1	3	3	2	1	1	2	1	1	6		BPI: Gold; ARIA: Platinum; BVMI: Gold; IFPI AUT: Gold; NVPI: Gold; RIAA: 2× Platinum; RMNZ: Platinum; SNEP: Gold
A Momentary Lapse of Reason	Released: 7 September 1987 (UK), 8 September 1987 (US); Label: Columbia/EMI (UK), Columbia (US); Formats: CD, LP, CS, DL	3	2	3	5	4	2	2	1	2	3	US. 1,700,000	BPI: Gold; BVMI: Gold; IFPI AUT: Gold; IFPI SWI: 2× Platinum; MC: 3× Platinum; NVPI: Gold; RIAA: 4× Platinum; SNEP: Platinum
The Division Bell	Released: 28 March 1994 (UK), 5 April 1994 (US); Label: Columbia/EMI (UK), Columbia (US); Formats: CD, LP, CS, DL	1	1	1	1	1	1	1	1	1	1	US: 3,330,000	BPI: 3× Platinum; ARIA: Platinum; BVMI: 3× Gold; IFPI AUT: Platinum; IFPI SWI: 2× Platinum; MC: 4× Platinum; NVPI: Platinum; RIAA: 3× Platinum; RMNZ: 4× Platinum; SNEP: 2× Platinum
The Endless River	Released: 10 November 2014; Label: Columbia/Parlophone (UK), Columbia (US); Formats: CD, LP, DL	1	3	1	1	1	1	1	1	1	3	CAN: 89,000; US: 355,000	BPI: Platinum; ARIA: Platinum; BVMI: Platinum; IFPI AUT: Gold; IFPI SWI: Gold; MC: Platinum; RIAA: Gold; RMNZ: Platinum; SNEP: 2× Platinum

=== Live albums ===
List of live albums, with selected chart positions, sales figures and certifications
Title	Album details	Peak chart positions										Sales	Certifications
Title	Album details	UK	AUS	AUT	CAN	FRA	GER	NLD	NZ	SWI	US	Sales	Certifications
Ummagumma	Released: 7 November 1969 (UK), 10 November 1969 (US); Label: Harvest/Columbia (UK), Harvest/EMI (US); Formats: CD, LP, CS, DL	5	—	—	78	10	25	5	—	—	74	FRA: 300,000	BPI: Gold; BVMI: Gold; RIAA: Platinum; SNEP: Gold
Delicate Sound of Thunder (Note: Delicate Sound of Thunder did not enter the Canadian Albums Chart, but the video peaked at number seven on the Long Form Music Videos chart.)	Released: 21 November 1988 (UK), 22 November 1988 (US); Label: Columbia/EMI (UK), Columbia (US), Formats: CD, LP, CS, DL	11	4	15	7	10	5	20	4	4	11		BPI: Gold; ARIA: 3× Platinum; BVMI: Gold; IFPI AUT: Gold; IFPI SWI: Platinum; MC: 2× Platinum; NVPI: Gold; RIAA: 3× Platinum; SNEP: 2× Gold
Pulse	Released: 29 May 1995 (UK), 6 June 1995 (US); Label: Columbia/EMI (UK), Columbia (US); Formats: CD, LP, CS, DL	1	1	1	1	3	1	1	1	1	1	UK: 349,428; US: 1,480,000	BPI: Platinum; ARIA: Platinum; BVMI: Platinum; IFPI AUT: Platinum; IFPI SWI: 3× Platinum; MC: 3× Platinum; NVPI: Gold; RIAA: 2× Platinum; SNEP: Platinum
Is There Anybody Out There? The Wall Live 1980–81	Released: 27 March 2000 (UK), 18 April 2000 (US); Label: EMI/Columbia (UK), Columbia (US); Formats: CD, CS	15	—	3	4	8	3	4	4	3	19		BPI: Gold; RIAA: Platinum
Live at Knebworth 1990	Released: 30 April 2021; Label: Pink Floyd; Formats: CD, LP	8	36	8	—	23	9	—	—	6	100		
The Dark Side of the Moon Live at Wembley 1974	Released: 24 March 2023; Label: Pink Floyd; Formats: CD, LP	4	—	—	59	12	—	4	—	—	49		
Pink Floyd at Pompeii – MCMLXXII	Released: 2 May 2025; Label: Columbia; Formats: CD, LP	1	27	1	45	3	1	3	15	1	28		
Live from the Los Angeles Sports Arena, April 26th, 1975	Released: 18 April 2026; Label: Columbia; Formats: CD, LP	46	43	8	—	—	7	—	—	3	82		
"—" denotes a recording that did not chart or was not released in that territory.

=== Compilation albums ===
List of compilation albums, with selected chart positions, sales figures and certifications
Title	Album details	Peak chart positions										Certifications
Title	Album details	UK	AUS	AUT	CAN	FRA	GER	NLD	NZ	SWI	US	Certifications
Tonite Lets All Make Love in London (Various artists including one exclusive Pink Floyd track)	Released: 18 July 1968; Label: Instant; Formats: LP	—	—	—	—	—	—	—	—	—	—	
Zabriskie Point (Various artists including three exclusive Pink Floyd tracks)	Released: 29 May 1970; Label: MGM; Formats: LP	—	—	—	—	9	—	—	—	—	—	
Picnic – A Breath of Fresh Air (Various artists including one exclusive Pink Floyd track)	Released: 1970 (UK); Label: Harvest; Formats: LP	—	—	—	—	—	—	—	—	—	—	
The Best of the Pink Floyd (Reissued as Masters of Rock in 1974)	Released: 1970 (Europe); Label: Columbia; Formats: LP	—	—	—	—	—	—	—	—	—	—	SNEP: Gold
Relics	Released: 14 May 1971 (UK), 15 July 1971 (US); Label: EMI (UK), Harvest/EMI (US); Formats: CD, LP, CS, DL	32	29	72	65	16	43	—	—	—	152	BPI: Gold
A Nice Pair	Released: 18 January 1974 (UK), 5 December 1973 (US); Label: Harvest/EMI; Formats: LP, CS, DL	21	—	—	33	17	—	—	—	—	36	BPI: Gold; RIAA: Gold; SNEP: Gold
A Collection of Great Dance Songs	Released: 23 November 1981; Label: Harvest/EMI (UK), Columbia (US); Formats: CD, LP, CS, DL	37	—	18	22	3	36	6	5	—	31	BPI: Gold; ARIA: Platinum; IFPI AUT: Gold; RIAA: 2× Platinum
Works	Released: June 1983 (US); Label: Capitol; Formats: CD, LP, CS, DL	—	64	—	—	35	—	—	—	—	68	
Knebworth '90 (Various artists including two exclusive Pink Floyd tracks)	Released: 1990; Label: Polydor; Formats: CD, LP, CS	—	—	—	—	—	—	—	—	—	—	
Echoes: The Best of Pink Floyd	Released: 5 November 2001 (UK), 6 November 2001 (US); Label: EMI (UK), Capitol (US); Formats: CD, LP, CS, DL	2	4	2	2	2	1	3	1	3	2	BPI: 3× Platinum; ARIA: Platinum; BVMI: Gold; IFPI SWI: Platinum; MC: 6× Platinum; RIAA: 4× Platinum; RMNZ: 3× Platinum; SNEP: Platinum
The Dark Side of the Moon Experience Edition	Released: 26 September 2011; Label: EMI; Formats: CD	—	—	—	—	—	—	—	—	—	—	
Wish You Were Here Experience Edition	Released: 7 November 2011; Label: EMI; Formats: CD	—	—	—	—	—	—	—	—	—	—	
The Best of Pink Floyd: A Foot in the Door	Released: 7 November 2011; Label: EMI; Formats: CD, LP, DL	14	15	25	22	7	30	21	8	23	50	BPI: 2× Platinum; ARIA: Platinum; RMNZ: Platinum; SNEP: Gold
The Wall Experience Edition	Released: 27 February 2012; Label: EMI; Formats: CD	—	—	—	—	—	—	—	—	—	—	
The Early Years 1967–1972: Cre/ation	Released: 11 November 2016; Label: Pink Floyd; Formats: CD, DL	19	47	29	38	21	20	22	—	24	103	
The Later Years 1987–2019	Released: 29 November 2019; Label: Pink Floyd; Formats: CD, LP, DL	32	45	50	—	40	18	31	—	10	197	BPI: Silver
Animals 2018 Remix	Released: 16 September 2022; Label: Pink Floyd; Formats: CD	—	—	—	—	—	—	—	—	—	—	
8-Tracks	Released: 5 June 2026; Label: Sony Music; Formats: CD, LP, DL	17	22	14	68	—	7	45	18	5	86	
"—" denotes a recording that did not chart or was not released in that territory.

=== Box sets ===
List of compilation albums, with selected chart positions, sales figures and certifications
Title	Album details	Peak chart positions							Certifications
Title	Album details	UK	AUT	FRA	GER	NLD	SWI	US	Certifications
Shine On	Released: 2 November 1992 (UK), 17 November 1992 (US); Label: EMI (UK), Columbia (US); Formats: CD	—	—	12	—	—	—	—	MC: Platinum; RIAA: Platinum
Oh, by the Way	Released: 10 December 2007 (UK), 11 December 2007 (US); Label: EMI (UK), Capitol (US); Formats: CD	—	—	21	—	—	—	—	
Discovery	Released: 26 September 2011; Label: EMI; Formats: CD	112	61	55	9	57	24	175	
The Dark Side of the Moon Immersion Edition	Released: 26 September 2011; Label: EMI; Formats: CD/DVD/BD	—	—	—	—	—	—	—	
Wish You Were Here Immersion Edition	Released: 7 November 2011; Label: EMI; Formats: CD/DVD/BD	—	—	—	—	—	—	—	
The Wall Immersion Edition	Released: 27 February 2012; Label: EMI; Formats: CD/DVD/BD	—	—	—	—	—	—	—	
The Early Years	Released: 11 November 2016; Label: Pink Floyd; Formats: CD/DVD/BD	—	—	52	61	—	—	—	
The Later Years	Released: 13 December 2019; Label: Pink Floyd; Formats: CD/DVD/BD	—	—	7	—	—	—	—	
Animals 2018 Remix	Released: 16 September 2022; Label: Pink Floyd; Formats: CD/DVD/BD	—	—	—	—	—	—	—	
The Dark Side of the Moon 50th Anniversary	Released: 24 March 2023; Label: Pink Floyd; Formats: CD/DVD/BD/LP	—	—	39	—	—	—	—	
Wish You Were Here 50	Released: 12 December 2025; Label: Columbia; Formats: CD/DVD/BD/LP	—	—	—	—	—	—	—	
"—" denotes a recording that did not chart or was not released in that territory.

== EPs ==
List of EPs
Title	Details
London '66–'67	Released: 20 November 1995; Label: See for Miles; Formats: CD, CS, DL
1967: The First Three Singles	Released: 4 August 1997; Label: EMI; Formats: CD, EP, CS, DL
1965: Their First Recordings	Released: 27 November 2015; Label: Parlophone; Formats: EP

== Singles ==
List of singles, with selected chart positions and certifications, showing year released and album name
Title	Year	Peak chart positions											Certifications	Album
Title	Year	UK	AUS	AUT	CAN	FRA	GER	NLD	NZ	IRL	US	US Main. Rock	Certifications	Album
"Arnold Layne" "Candy and a Currant Bun"	1967	20	—	—	—	—	—	24 (Note: 1971 re-release)	—	—	—	—		Non-album singles (Note: "The Scarecrow", B-side of "See Emily Play", was a track on The Piper at the Gates of Dawn)
"See Emily Play" "The Scarecrow"	1967	6	—	—	—	—	25	—	—	10	— (Note: "See Emily Play" did not enter the Billboard Hot 100, but peaked at number 134 on the Bubbling Under Hot 100 Singles chart.)	—		Non-album singles
"Flaming" "The Gnome"	1967	—	—	—	—	—	—	—	—	—	—	—		The Piper at the Gates of Dawn
"Apples and Oranges" "Paint Box"	1967	55 (Note: "Apples and Oranges" peaked at number 5 on the "Bubbling Under" list, which was an officially published BRMB list of the most popular records in the UK outside of the top 50.)	—	—	—	—	—	—	—	—	—	—		Non-album singles
"It Would Be So Nice" "Julia Dream"	1968	52 (Note: "It Would Be So Nice" peaked at number 2 on the "Bubbling Under" list.)	—	—	—	—	—	—	—	—	—	—		Non-album singles
"Let There Be More Light" "Remember a Day"	1968	—	—	—	—	—	—	—	—	—	—	—		A Saucerful of Secrets
"Point Me at the Sky" "Careful with That Axe, Eugene"	1968	—	—	—	—	—	—	—	—	—	—	—		Non-album single
"The Nile Song" "Ibiza Bar"	1969	—	—	—	—	—	—	—	—	—	—	—		More
"One of These Days" "Fearless"	1971	—	—	—	—	—	—	—	—	—	—	—		Meddle
"Free Four" "The Gold It's in the.."	1972	—	—	—	—	36	—	29	—	—	—	—		Obscured by Clouds
"Money" "Any Colour You Like"	1973	—	—	10	18	6	49	—	—	—	13	—	BPI: Platinum; RMNZ: 2× Platinum	The Dark Side of the Moon
"Us and Them" "Time"	1974	—	—	—	85	—	—	—	—	—	— (Note: "Us and Them" did not enter the Billboard Hot 100, but peaked at number 101 on the Bubbling Under Hot 100 Singles chart.)	—	BPI: Silver/ BPI: Gold; RMNZ: Platinum/RMNZ: 2× Platinum	The Dark Side of the Moon
"Have a Cigar" (featuring Roy Harper) "Welcome to the Machine"	1975	—	—	—	—	15	—	—	—	—	—	—	BPI: Silver; RMNZ: Platinum	Wish You Were Here
"Another Brick in the Wall (Part II)" "One of My Turns"	1979	1	2	1	1	1	1	4	1	1	1	—	BPI: Platinum; BVMI: Gold; RIAA: Platinum; RMNZ: 4× Platinum; SNEP: Gold	The Wall
"Run Like Hell" "Don't Leave Me Now"	1980	—	—	—	15	32	46	—	30	—	53	—	RMNZ: Gold	The Wall
"Comfortably Numb" "Hey You"	1980	—	—	—	—	—	—	—	—	—	—	—	BPI: Platinum/ BPI: Silver; RMNZ: 3× Platinum/RMNZ: Platinum	The Wall
"When the Tigers Broke Free" (added to The Final Cut in 2004) "Bring the Boys Back Home" (alternative version from Pink Floyd – The Wall)	1982	39	91	—	43	70	—	—	—	23	—	—		Non-album single
"Not Now John" "The Hero's Return (Parts 1 and 2)"	1983	30	—	—	—	5	—	—	—	20	—	7		The Final Cut
"Learning to Fly" "Terminal Frost"	1987	—	34	—	—	60	71	—	10	—	70	1	RMNZ: Platinum	A Momentary Lapse of Reason
"On the Turning Away" "Run Like Hell" (live version)	1987	55	48	—	—	18	—	47	34	—	—	1	RMNZ: Gold	A Momentary Lapse of Reason
"One Slip" "Terminal Frost / The Dogs of War" (live version)	1987	50	—	—	—	—	—	—	—	—	—	5		A Momentary Lapse of Reason
"Take It Back" "Astronomy Domine" (live version)	1994	23	61	—	—	50	75	23	7	—	73	4		The Division Bell
"High Hopes" "Keep Talking"	1994	26	—	—	43	4	—	—	—	—	—	7		The Division Bell
"Keep Talking" "One of These Days" (live version)	1994	26	—	—	8	—	—	—	—	—	—	1		The Division Bell
"Lost for Words"	1994	—	—	—	53	—	—	—	—	—	—	—		The Division Bell
"Wish You Were Here" (live)	1995	—	—	—	—	—	—	—	—	—	—	—		Pulse
"What Do You Want from Me"	1995	—	—	—	28	—	—	—	—	—	—	—		Pulse
"Louder than Words"	2014	—	—	—	—	—	—	—	—	—	—	—		The Endless River
"Hey, Hey, Rise Up!" (featuring Andriy Khlyvnyuk)	2022	49	—	—	—	—	61	—	—	—	— (Note: "Hey, Hey, Rise Up!" did not enter the Billboard Hot 100, but peaked at number 2 on the Digital Song Sales chart.)	—		Non-album single
"—" denotes a recording that did not chart or was not released in that territory.

=== Promotional singles ===
List of promotional singles, with selected chart positions, showing year released and album name
Title	Year	Peak chart positions	Album
Title	Year	US Main. Rock	Album
"Pigs (Three Different Ones)"	1977	—	Animals
"The Dogs of War"	1987	30	A Momentary Lapse of Reason
"—" denotes a recording that did not chart or was not released in that territory.

== Other charted and certified songs ==
List of songs, with selected chart positions, showing year released and album name
Title	Year	Peak chart positions							Certifications	Album
Title	Year	UK	AUT	FRA	GER	NOR	SWE	US Main. Rock	Certifications	Album
"Jugband Blues"	1968	—	—	—	—	12	—	x		A Saucerful of Secrets
"Breathe"	1973	—	—	—	—	—	—	x	BPI: Gold; RMNZ: Platinum	The Dark Side of the Moon
"The Great Gig in the Sky"	1973	—	—	—	—	—	—	x	RMNZ: Platinum	The Dark Side of the Moon
"Brain Damage"	1973	—	—	—	—	—	—	x	RMNZ: Platinum	The Dark Side of the Moon
"Eclipse"	1973	—	—	—	—	—	—	x	RMNZ: Gold	The Dark Side of the Moon
"Shine On You Crazy Diamond" (Parts I–V)	1975	—	—	—	—	—	—	x	BPI: Silver; RMNZ: Platinum	Wish You Were Here
"Welcome to the Machine"	1975	—	—	—	—	—	—	x	RMNZ: Gold	Wish You Were Here
"Wish You Were Here"	1975	68	48	79	67	18	37	x	BPI: 2× Platinum; RMNZ: 6× Platinum	Wish You Were Here
"Another Brick in the Wall (Part One)"	1979	—	—	—	—	—	—	x	RMNZ: Gold	The Wall
"Mother"	1979	—	—	—	—	—	—	x	RMNZ: Gold	The Wall
"Young Lust"	1979	—	—	—	—	—	—	x	RMNZ: Gold	The Wall
"Money" (1981 re-recording)	1981	—	—	—	—	—	—	37		A Collection of Great Dance Songs
"Your Possible Pasts"	1983	—	—	—	—	—	—	8		The Final Cut
"The Hero's Return"	1983	—	—	—	—	—	—	31		The Final Cut
"Sorrow"	1987	—	—	—	—	—	—	36		A Momentary Lapse of Reason
"Comfortably Numb" (live)	1988	—	—	—	—	—	—	24		Delicate Sound of Thunder
"Lost for Words"	1994	—	—	—	—	—	—	21		The Division Bell
"What Do You Want from Me"	1994	—	—	—	—	—	—	16		The Division Bell
"What Do You Want from Me" (live)	1995	—	—	—	—	—	—	13		Pulse
"Young Lust" (live)	2000	—	—	—	—	—	—	15		Is There Anybody Out There? The Wall Live 1980–81
"—" denotes a recording that did not chart or was not released in that territory. "x" denotes that the chart did not exist at the time.

== Other appearances ==
Year	Album/single	Collaborator	Comment
1995	Goldtop: Groups & Sessions '74–'94	Snowy White	The compilation includes the full-length version of "Pigs on the Wing".

== See also ==
- Pink Floyd videography
- Pink Floyd bootleg recordings
- List of unreleased songs recorded by Pink Floyd
