= List of Pink Floyd band members =

Mason, Wright, Waters, and Barrett in 1967

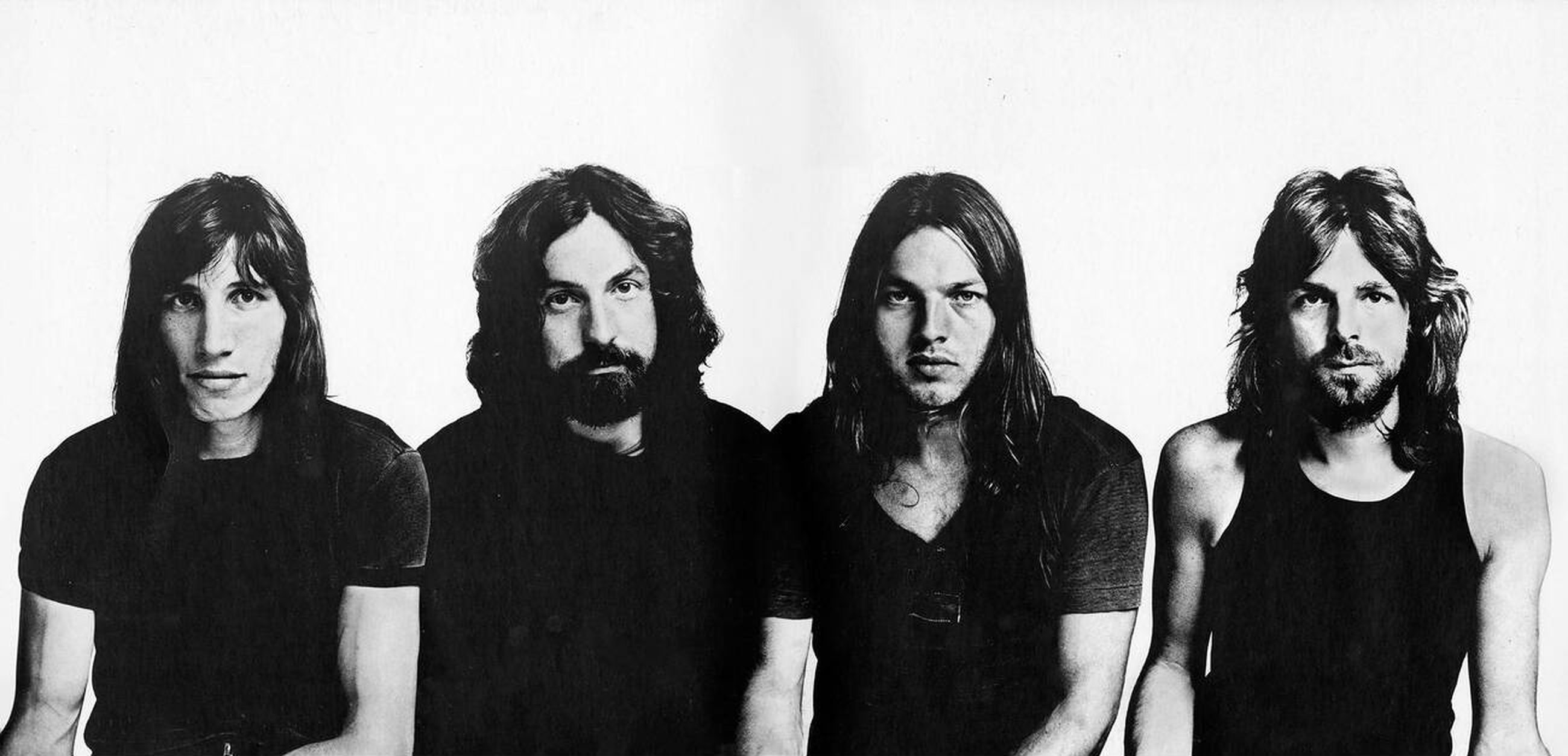
Waters, Mason, Gilmour and Wright in 1971

Pink Floyd are an English rock band founded in late 1965 by Syd Barrett on guitar and lead vocals, Nick Mason on drums, Roger Waters on bass and vocals, and Richard Wright on keyboards and vocals. Guitarist and vocalist David Gilmour joined in December 1967, while Barrett was ousted in April 1968 due to deteriorating mental health. From the 1970s onwards, Pink Floyd were augmented by additional personnel in the studio and on stage. Following creative tensions, Wright left in 1981, followed by Waters in 1985. Wright rejoined as a session musician and, later, a member. Mason is the only member to appear on every album.

== History ==
Waters and Mason met while studying architecture at the London Polytechnic at Regent Street. They first played music together in a group formed by fellow students Keith Noble and Clive Metcalfe, with Noble's sister Sheilagh. Richard Wright, a fellow architecture student, joined later that year, and the group became a sextet, Sigma 6. Waters played lead guitar, Mason drums, and Wright rhythm guitar, later moving to keyboards.

Guitarist Bob Klose joined during September 1964, prompting Waters to switch to bass. Sigma 6 went through several names, including the Meggadeaths, the Abdabs and the Screaming Abdabs, Leonard's Lodgers, and the Spectrum Five, before settling on the Tea Set. In September 1964, as Metcalfe and Noble left to form their own band, Klose introduced the band to singer Chris Dennis, a technician with the Royal Air Force (RAF). When the RAF assigned Dennis a post in Bahrain in early 1965, Syd Barrett became the band's frontman. After pressure from his parents and advice from his college tutors, Klose quit the band in mid-1965 and Barrett took over lead guitar. The group rebranded as the Pink Floyd Sound in late 1965.

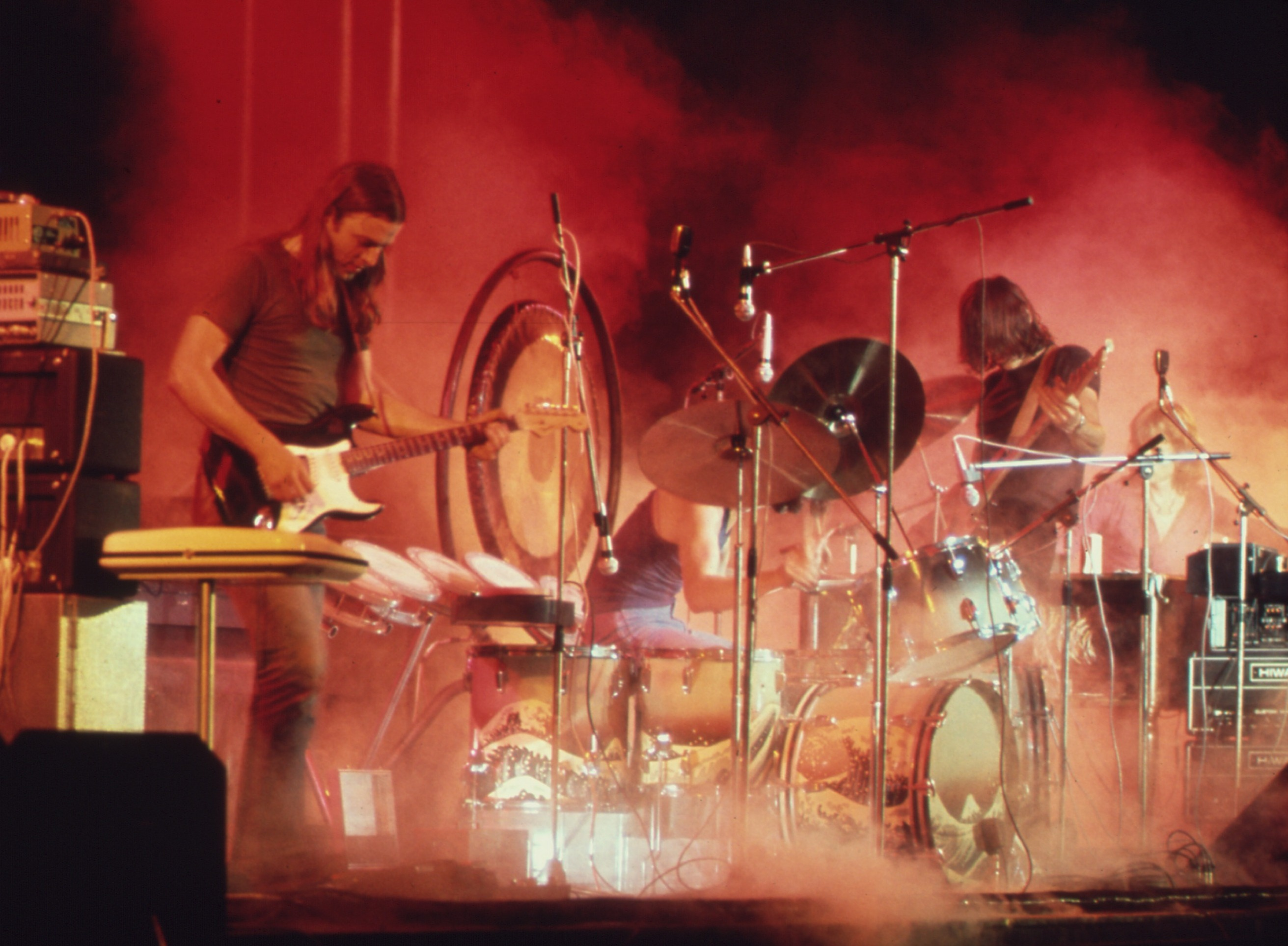
Pink Floyd in 1973

In December 1967, reaching a crisis point with Barrett, Pink Floyd added guitarist David Gilmour as the fifth member. Gilmour already knew Barrett, having studied with him at Cambridge Tech in the early 1960s. Working with Barrett eventually proved too difficult, and matters came to a conclusion in January while en route to a performance in Southampton when a band member asked if they should collect Barrett. According to Gilmour, the answer was "Nah, let's not bother", signalling the end of Barrett's tenure with Pink Floyd.

For the Dark Side of the Moon Tour in 1973, the band were joined by saxophonist Dick Parry, as well as by backing singers Nawasa Crowder, Mary Ann Lindsey and Phyllis Lindsey from March – June 1973, Billy Barnum, Venetta Fields and Clydie King in October 1973, and Vicki Brown, Liza Strike and Clare Torry at "A Benefit for Robert Wyatt", 4 November 1973. Parry stayed with the band into 1974 and 1975, alongside Venetta Fields & Carlena Williams on backing vocals.

The band stopped using female singers for the In the Flesh tour in 1977, instead the band were joined by Snowy White on guitar, bass and backing vocals, alongside Parry on saxophone and keyboards.

During the recording of The Wall (1979), the band became dissatisfied with Wright's lack of contribution and fired him. Gilmour said that Wright was dismissed as he "hadn't contributed anything of any value whatsoever to the album—he did very, very little". For The Wall tour, Wright was re-hired as a contracted musician, alongside Andy Bown on bass guitar, Snowy White on guitars, Willie Wilson on drums and percussion, Peter Wood on keyboards, and backing singers Joe Chemay, Stan Farber, Jim Haas, John Joyce.

After recording The Final Cut (1983) without Wright, Waters left the band, following tensions with Gilmour and Mason. Pink Floyd were inactive until 1986, following legal battles between members. Gilmour began recruiting musicians in 1986, for what would later become Pink Floyd. He rehired Wright, but could only add him as a contract musician.

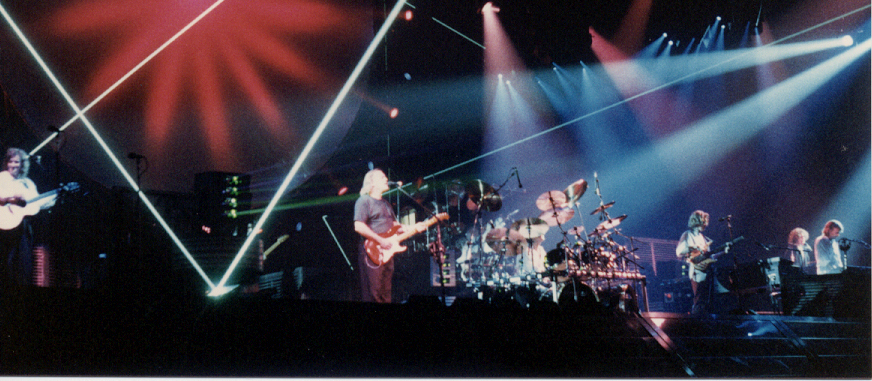
Pink Floyd in 1989

For the A Momentary Lapse of Reason Tour, which started in 1987, Gilmour, Wright and Mason were joined by Jon Carin on keyboards and vocals, Scott Page on saxophones, oboe and guitars, Guy Pratt on bass guitar and vocals, Tim Renwick on guitars and backing vocals, Gary Wallis on percussion, and backing vocalists Rachel Fury and Margaret Taylor. Durga McBroom, Lorelei McBroom and Roberta Freeman joined as extra backing vocalist midway through the first leg of the tour. Durga continued with the band while Freeman departed after a few shows, alongside Lorelei, though she returned to replace Taylor for 1989 shows.

Pink Floyd played one show in 1990, backing musicians included Pratt, Carin, Renwick, Wallis and D. McBroom, alongside keyboardist Michael Kamen, saxophonist Candy Dulfer, and backing vocalists Sam Brown, Vicki Brown and Clare Torry. They also played a one off in 1993, with members of Mike and the Mechanics as backing musicians, Mike Rutherford on bass, Renwick on guitar, Wallis on second drums, Adrian Lee on keyboards, and Paul Young on vocals. The bands final tour, The Division Bell Tour included Pratt, Carin, Renwick, Wallis, Dick Parry returning on sax, and backing vocalists Sam Brown, Claudia Fontaine, and Durga McBroom.

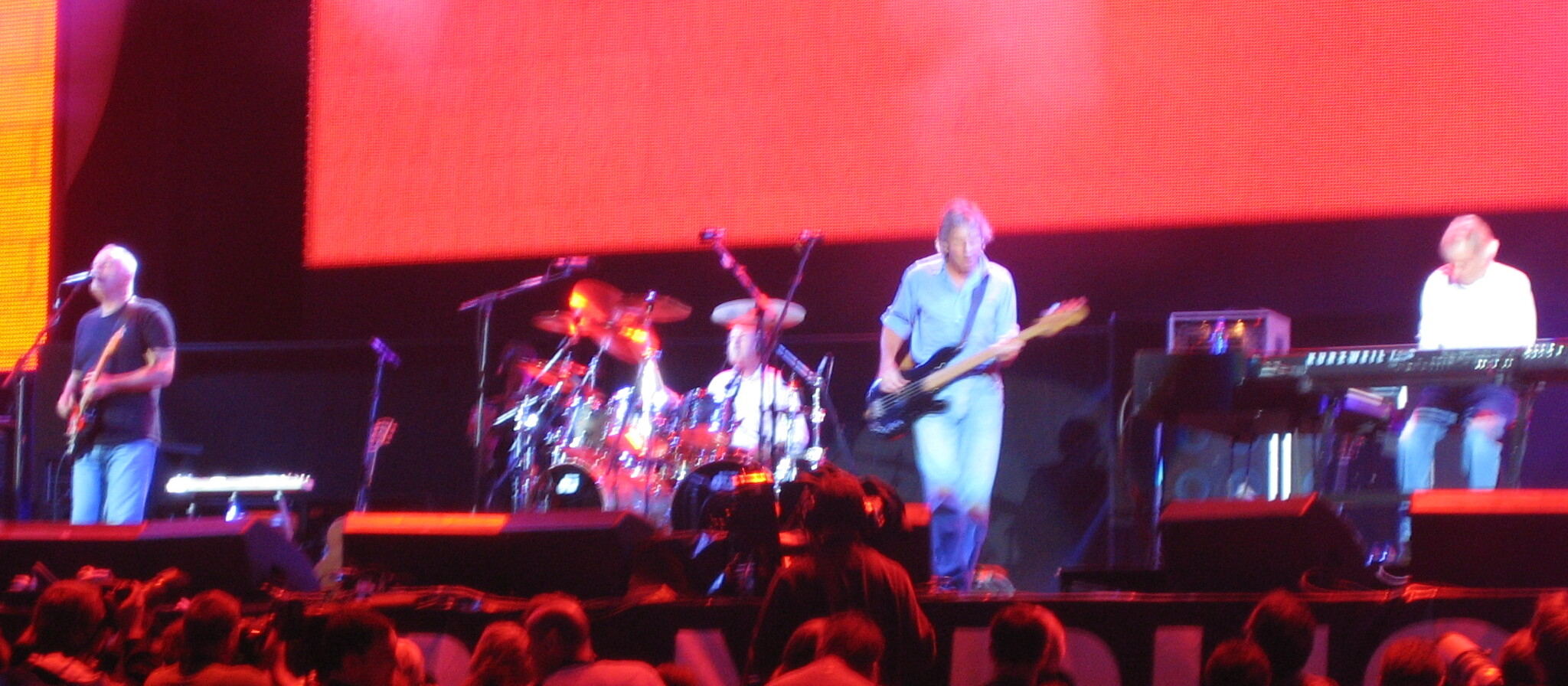
Pink Floyd in 2005

The band reunited in 1996, with Gilmour, Mason and Wright being joined by Billy Corgan, to perform "Wish You Were Here". Waters rejoined Gilmour, Wright and Mason at Live 8 in 2005, the band were supported by Carin on additional keys and lap steel, Renwick on guitar and bass and Carol Kenyon on additional vocals. Wright, Gilmour and Mason played at the Madcap's Last Laugh concert in Tribute to Syd Barrett who died in 2006. They were joined by Carin on keys and Oasis's Andy Bell on bass. Wright died in 2008.

Mason and Gilmour reunited in 2013 to finish an album that be been partially recorded in the 90s, this was announced to be their last. The duo again reunited in 2022, releasing "Hey, Hey, Rise Up!" protesting Russian's invasion of Ukraine.

== Official members ==
Image	Name	Years active	Instruments	Release contributions
	Nick Mason	1965–1994; 2005 (Live 8 reunion concert); 2007; 2013–2014; 2022	drums; percussion; tape effects; occasional vocals and acoustic guitar	all Pink Floyd releases
	Roger Waters	1965–1985; 2005 (Live 8 reunion concert)	bass; lead and backing vocals; tape effects; occasional guitar, percussion, and synthesizers	all releases from "Arnold Layne" (1967) to The Final Cut (1983); Is There Anybody Out There? The Wall Live 1980–81 (2000); 1965: Their First Recordings (2015)
	Richard Wright	1965–1979; 1987–1994; 2005 (Live 8 reunion concert); 2007 (session musician during 1979–1981 and 1986–1987) (died 2008)	keyboards; backing and lead vocals; synthesizers; rhythm guitar and occasional trombone (1963–1964)	all releases except for "When the Tigers Broke Free" (1982), The Final Cut (1983) and "Hey, Hey, Rise Up!" (2022)
	Roger "Syd" Barrett	1965–1968 (died 2006)	lead and backing vocals; guitar	all releases from "Arnold Layne" (1967) to "Apples and Oranges" (1967); A Saucerful of Secrets (1968) (three tracks only); 1965: Their First Recordings (2015)
	David Gilmour	1967–1994; 2005 (Live 8 reunion concert); 2007; 2013–2014; 2022	guitar; lead and backing vocals; occasional bass, keyboards, synthesizers, and drums	all releases from "It Would Be So Nice" (1968) onwards except for 1965: Their First Recordings (2015)

== Live members ==
Image	Name	Years active	Instruments	Release contributions/tours
	David O'List	1967	guitar; vocals	Substitute for Syd Barrett
	Nawasa Crowder	1973	backing vocals	The Dark Side of the Moon Tour 1973
	Mary Ann Lindsey	1973	backing vocals	The Dark Side of the Moon Tour 1973
	Phyllis Lindsey	1973	backing vocals	The Dark Side of the Moon Tour 1973
	Billie Barnum	1973	backing vocals	The Dark Side of the Moon Tour 1973
	Clydie King	1973	backing vocals	The Dark Side of the Moon Tour 1973
	Venetta Fields	1973–1975	backing vocals	Wish You Were Here (1975) – also The Dark Side of the Moon Tour 1973, French Concert Series 1974, British Winter Tour 1974 and North American Tour 1975
	Carlena Williams	1973–1975 (died 2013)	backing vocals	Wish You Were Here (1975) – also The Dark Side of the Moon Tour 1973, French Concert Series 1974, British Winter Tour 1974 and North American Tour 1975
	Liza Strike	1973	backing vocals	The Dark Side of the Moon (1973)
	Clare Torry	1973; 1990 (session 1979)	backing vocals	The Dark Side of the Moon (1973) one track only; The Wall (1979) one track only – also The Dark Side of the Moon Tour 1973 and Knebworth Festival Benefit Concert 1990
	Vicki Brown	1973; 1990 (session 1979) (died 1991)	backing vocals	The Wall (1979) one track only – also The Dark Side of the Moon Tour 1973 and Knebworth Festival Benefit Concert 1990
	Dick Parry	1973–1978; 1994; 2005; (died 2026)	saxophone; keyboards	The Dark Side of the Moon (1973); Wish You Were Here (1975); A Collection of Great Dance Songs (1981); The Division Bell (1994) – also The Dark Side of the Moon Tour 1973, French Concert Series 1974, British Winter Tour 1974, North American Tour 1975, In the Flesh 1977, The Division Bell Tour 1994 and Live 8 Concert 2005
	Snowy White	1977–1980	guitar; bass; backing vocals	Animals (1977) one track on 8-track version only – also In the Flesh 1977 and The Wall tour (1980 only)
	Jim Haas	1980–1981 (session 1979) (died 2018)	backing vocals	The Wall (1979) – also The Wall tour
	Joe Chemay	1980–1981 (session 1979)	backing vocals	The Wall (1979) – also The Wall tour
	Stan Farber	1980–1981 (session 1979)	backing vocals	The Wall (1979) – also The Wall tour
	John Joyce	1980–1981 (session 1979)	backing vocals	The Wall (1979) – also The Wall tour
	Andy Bown	1980–1981 (session 1982)	bass; acoustic guitar (live only); keyboards (studio only)	The Final Cut (1983) – also The Wall tour
	Peter Wood	1980–1981	keyboards; acoustic guitar	The Wall tour
	Willie Wilson	1980–1981	drums; percussion	The Wall tour
	Clive Brooks	1981 (substitute) (died 2017)	drums; percussion	The Wall tour performance at one show only, tech for whole tour
	Andy Roberts	1981	guitar	The Wall tour (1981 only)
	Jon Carin	1987–1994; 2005; 2007	keyboards; percussion; lap steel guitar (2005); vocals	A Momentary Lapse of Reason (1987); Delicate Sound of Thunder (1988); The Division Bell (1994); Pulse (1995); The Endless River (2014) – also A Momentary Lapse of Reason tour 1987–1989, Knebworth Festival Benefit Concert 1990, The Division Bell Tour 1994, Live 8 Concert 2005 and The Madcap's Last Laugh: Syd Barrett tribute concert 2007
	Tim Renwick	1987–1994; 2005	guitar; backing vocals; bass (2005)	Pink Floyd – The Wall (1982); A Momentary Lapse of Reason (1987); The Division Bell (1994) – also A Momentary Lapse of Reason tour 1987–1989, Knebworth Festival Benefit Concert 1990, King Edward VII Hospital Benefit Concert 1993, The Division Bell Tour 1994 and Live 8 Concert 2005
	Guy Pratt	1987–1994 (session 2013, 2022)	bass; vocals	Delicate Sound of Thunder (1988); The Division Bell (1994); Pulse (1995); The Endless River (2014); "Hey, Hey, Rise Up!" (2022) – A Momentary Lapse of Reason tour 1987–1989, Knebworth Festival Benefit Concert 1990 and The Division Bell Tour 1994
	Gary Wallis	1987–1994	percussion; additional keyboards; drums	Delicate Sound of Thunder (1988); The Division Bell (1994); Pulse (1995) – also A Momentary Lapse of Reason tour 1987–1989, Knebworth Festival Benefit Concert 1990, King Edward VII Hospital Benefit Concert 1993 and The Division Bell Tour 1994
	Scott Page	1987–1989	saxophone; oboe; guitar	A Momentary Lapse of Reason (1987) – also A Momentary Lapse of Reason tour 1987–1989
	Rachel Fury	1987–1989	backing vocals	A Momentary Lapse of Reason tour 1987–1989
	Margaret Taylor	1987–1988	backing vocals	A Momentary Lapse of Reason Tour 1987 and World Tour 1988
	Durga McBroom	1987–1994 (session 2013–2014)	backing vocals	The Division Bell (1994); The Endless River (2014) – also A Momentary Lapse of Reason tour 1987–1989, Knebworth Festival Benefit Concert 1990 and The Division Bell Tour 1994
	Lorelei McBroom	1987; 1989	backing vocals	A Momentary Lapse of Reason Tour 1987 and Another Lapse 1989
	Roberta Freeman	1987	backing vocals	A Momentary Lapse of Reason Tour 1987
	Sam Brown	1990–1994	backing vocals	The Division Bell (1994) – also Knebworth Festival Benefit Concert 1990 and The Division Bell Tour 1994
	Candy Dulfer	1990	saxophone	Knebworth Festival Benefit Concert 1990
	Michael Kamen	1990 (session 1979, 1982, 1993) (died 2003)	keyboards	The Wall (1979); The Final Cut (1983); The Division Bell (1994) – also Knebworth Festival Benefit Concert 1990
	Mike Rutherford	1993	bass	King Edward VII Hospital Benefit Concert 1993 – with Mike and the Mechanics
	Adrian Lee	1993	keyboards; backing vocals	King Edward VII Hospital Benefit Concert 1993 – with Mike and the Mechanics
	Paul Young	1993 (died 2000)	vocals; tambourine	King Edward VII Hospital Benefit Concert 1993 – with Mike and the Mechanics
	Claudia Fontaine	1994 (died 2018)	backing vocals	The Division Bell Tour 1994
	Billy Corgan	1996	guitar	Rock and Roll Hall of Fame 1996
	Carol Kenyon	2005 (session 1982)	backing vocals	The Division Bell (1994) – also Live 8 Concert 2005
	Andy Bell	2007	bass	The Madcap's Last Laugh: Syd Barrett tribute concert 2007

== Session members ==
Image	Name	Years active	Instruments	Release contributions
	Doris Troy	1972–1973 (died 2004)	backing vocals	The Dark Side of the Moon (1973)
	Lesley Duncan	1972–1973 (died 2010)	backing vocals	The Dark Side of the Moon (1973)
	Barry St. John	1972–1973 (died 2020)	backing vocals	The Dark Side of the Moon (1973)
	Roy Harper	1975	vocals	Wish You Were Here (1975)
	Bob Ezrin	1978–1979; 1986–1994	keyboards; percussion; orchestral arrangement; composition; backing vocals; bass guitar	The Wall (1979); A Momentary Lapse of Reason (1987); The Endless River (2014)
	Jeff Porcaro	1979 (died 1992)	drums	The Wall (1979)
	Joe Porcaro	1979 (died 2020)	drums	The Wall (1979)
	Bruce Johnston	1979	backing vocals	The Wall (1979)
	Toni Tennille	1979	backing vocals	The Wall (1979)
	James Guthrie	1979	percussion; synthesizer; sound effects	The Wall (1979)
	Children of Islington Green School	1979	vocals	The Wall (1979)
	Lee Ritenour	1979	guitar	The Wall (1979)
	Joe (Ron) di Blasi	1979	guitar	The Wall (1979)
	Fred Mandel	1979	Hammond organ	The Wall (1979)
	Bobbye Hall	1979	congas and bongos	The Wall (1979)
	Larry Williams	1979	clarinet	The Wall (1979)
	Trevor Veitch	1979	mandolin	The Wall (1979)
	New York Orchestra	1979	orchestra	The Wall (1979)
	New York Opera	1979	choral vocals	The Wall (1979)
	Harry Waters	1979	voice	The Wall (1979)
	Chris Fitzmorris	1979	voice	The Wall (1979)
	Trudy Young	1979	voice	The Wall (1979)
	Phil Taylor	1979	sound effects	The Wall (1979)
	Frank Marocco	1979 (died 2012)	concertina	The Wall (1979)
	Andy Newmark	1982	drums	The Final Cut (1983)
	Ray Cooper	1982	percussion	The Final Cut (1983)
	Doreen Chanter	1982	backing vocals	The Final Cut (1983)
	Irene Chanter	1982	backing vocals	The Final Cut (1983)
	National Philharmonic Orchestra	1982	orchestra	The Final Cut (1983)
	Raphael Ravenscroft	1982 (died 2014)	tenor saxophone	The Final Cut (1983)
	Patrick Leonard	1986–1987	synthesizers	A Momentary Lapse of Reason (1987)
	Bill Payne	1986–1987	Hammond organ	A Momentary Lapse of Reason (1987)
	Michael Landau	1986–1987	guitar	A Momentary Lapse of Reason (1987)
	Tony Levin	1986–1987	bass; Chapman Stick	A Momentary Lapse of Reason (1987)
	Jim Keltner	1986–1987	drums	A Momentary Lapse of Reason (1987)
	Carmine Appice	1986–1987	drums	A Momentary Lapse of Reason (1987)
	Steve Forman	1986–1987	percussion	A Momentary Lapse of Reason (1987)
	Tom Scott	1986–1987	saxophone	A Momentary Lapse of Reason (1987)
	John Helliwell	1986–1987	saxophone	A Momentary Lapse of Reason (1987)
	Darlene Koldenhoven	1986–1987	backing vocals	A Momentary Lapse of Reason (1987)
	Carmen Twillie	1986–1987	backing vocals	A Momentary Lapse of Reason (1987)
	Phyllis St. James	1986–1987	backing vocals	A Momentary Lapse of Reason (1987)
	Donny Gerrard	1986–1987 (died 2022)	backing vocals	A Momentary Lapse of Reason (1987)
	Jackie Sheridan	1993–1994	backing vocals	The Division Bell (1994)
	Rebecca Leigh-White	1993–1994	backing vocals	The Division Bell (1994)
	Andy Jackson	2013–2014	bass; sound effects	The Endless River (2014)
	Damon Iddins	2013–2014	keyboards	The Endless River (2014)
	Anthony Moore	2013–2014	keyboards	The Endless River (2014)
	Gilad Atzmon	2013–2014	saxophone; clarinet	The Endless River (2014)
	Louise Marshal	2013–2014	backing vocals	The Endless River (2014)
	Tidaya Sharim	2013–2014	backing vocals	The Endless River (2014)
	Youth	2013–2014	programming; synthesizers; keyboards	The Endless River (2014)
	Eddie Bander	2013–2014	programming; synthesizers; keyboards	The Endless River (2014)
	Michael Rendall	2013–2014	programming; synthesizers; keyboards	The Endless River (2014)
	Escala	2013–2014	strings	The Endless River (2014)
	Nitin Sawhney	2022	keyboards	"Hey, Hey, Rise Up!" (2022)
	Veryovka Ukrainian Folk Choir	2022	choir	"Hey, Hey, Rise Up!" (2022)

== Members of early antecedents ==
In addition to the official members of Pink Floyd, there were several members of bands that preceded it. These bands performed at various times as Sigma 6, the Meggadeaths, the Abdabs (or the Screaming Abdabs), Leonard's Lodgers, the Spectrum Five, and the Tea Set.

Name	Years active	Instruments	Release contributions
Mike Leonard	1963	keyboards	None
Clive Metcalfe	1963–1964	bass	None
Keith Noble	1963–1964 (died 2014)	vocals	None
Sheilagh Noble	1963	vocals	None
Vernon Thompson	1963	guitar	None
Juliette Gale	1964	vocals	1965: Their First Recordings (2015)
Bob Klose	1964–1965	guitar	1965: Their First Recordings (2015)
Chris Denis	1965	vocals	None

== Line-ups ==
Period	Members	Releases
September 1963 – August 1964 (Sigma 6)	Nick Mason – drums; Roger Waters – lead guitar; Richard Wright – rhythm guitar; Clive Metcalfe – bass; Keith Noble – vocals; Sheilagh Noble – vocals	none
September 1964 – Early 1965 (The Tea Set)	Nick Mason – drums; Roger Waters – bass; Richard Wright – keyboards; Bob Klose – guitar; Chris Dennis – vocals	none
Early – Mid 1965 (The Tea Set)	Nick Mason – drums; Roger Waters – bass, vocals; Richard Wright – keyboards; Bob Klose – guitar; Syd Barrett – vocals, guitar	1965: Their First Recordings (2015)
Mid 1965 – December 1967 (The Tea Set until late 1965, Pink Floyd from late 1965 onwards)	Nick Mason – drums; Roger Waters – bass, vocals; Richard Wright – keyboards, vocals; Syd Barrett – guitar, vocals	"Arnold Layne" single (1967); "See Emily Play" single (1967); The Piper at the Gates of Dawn (1967); "Apples and Oranges" single (1967); A Saucerful of Secrets (1968) – two tracks "Remember a Day" and "Jugband Blues"; London '66–'67 EP (1995); The Early Years 1965–1972 box set (2016) – Volumes 1 and 7
January – March 1968	Nick Mason – drums; Roger Waters – bass, vocals; Richard Wright – keyboards, vocals; Syd Barrett – guitar, vocals; David Gilmour – guitar, vocals	A Saucerful of Secrets (1968) – one track "Set the Controls for the Heart of the Sun"
April 1968 – June 1981	Nick Mason – drums; Roger Waters – bass, vocals; Richard Wright – keyboards, vocals; David Gilmour – guitar, vocals	"It Would Be So Nice" single (1968); A Saucerful of Secrets (1968) – remaining tracks; "Point Me at the Sky" single (1968); More (1969); Ummagumma (1969); Zabriskie Point (1970); Atom Heart Mother (1970); Meddle (1971); Obscured by Clouds (1972); The Dark Side of the Moon (1973); Wish You Were Here (1975); Animals (1977); The Wall (1979); Is There Anybody Out There? The Wall Live 1980–81 (2000); The Early Years 1965–1972 box set (2016) – Volume 2 onwards; The Dark Side of the Moon Live at Wembley 1974 (2023)
July 1981 – December 1985	Nick Mason – drums; Roger Waters – bass, keyboards, vocals; David Gilmour – guitar, keyboards, vocals	"When the Tigers Broke Free" single (1982); The Final Cut (1983)
January 1986 – August 1987	Nick Mason – drums; David Gilmour – guitar, bass, keyboards, vocals	A Momentary Lapse of Reason (1987)
September 1987 – June 2005	Nick Mason – drums; David Gilmour – guitar, bass, vocals; Richard Wright – keyboards, vocals	Delicate Sound of Thunder (1988); The Division Bell (1994); Pulse (1995); The Endless River (2014) – includes some recordings from this period; The Later Years box set (2019); Live at Knebworth 1990 (2021)
July 2005 (Live 8)	Nick Mason – drums; David Gilmour – guitar, vocals; Richard Wright – keyboards, vocals; Roger Waters – bass, vocals	none
August 2005 – September 2008	Nick Mason – drums; David Gilmour – guitar, bass, vocals; Richard Wright – keyboards, vocals	none
October 2008 – Present	Nick Mason – drums; David Gilmour – guitar, bass, keyboards, vocals	The Endless River (2014) – additional material; "Hey, Hey, Rise Up!" single (2022)
