= 1967: The First Three Singles =

EP by Pink Floyd
- Released: 4 August 1997
- Recorded: 29 January – 27 October 1967
- Studio: Sound Techniques and Abbey Road Studios, London
- Genre: Psychedelic rock
- Length: 17:39
- Language: English
- Label: EMI
- Producer: Joe Boyd; Norman Smith

Pink Floyd chronology
London '66–'67 (1995)	1967: The First Three Singles (1997)	Is There Anybody Out There? The Wall Live 1980–81 (2000)

The 1967 Singles Sampler, or 1967: The First Three Singles, is a compilation album by English rock band Pink Floyd, released in 1997 as a limited edition CD to commemorate the 30th anniversary of the band.

== Contents ==
Professional ratings
Review scores
Source	Rating
AllMusic	4.5/5 stars

1967: The First Three Singles contains digitally remastered versions of all three of the band's 7" singles from 1967, mostly written by then-frontman Syd Barrett, presented in their original 7" mono mixes. The album cover features a collage of the original three single sleeves.

== Singles reception ==
"Arnold Layne," released on 11 March 1967, reached #20 in the charts, while "See Emily Play," released 16 June 1967, made it to #6, their highest-charting single in the UK until the release of "Another Brick in the Wall (Part 2)" in 1979. Conversely, "Apples and Oranges," released 18 November 1967, was largely overlooked, with Pink Floyd bassist Roger Waters blaming its poor sales on bad production.

== Other appearances ==
With the exception of "Candy and a Currant Bun," "Scarecrow" and "Apples and Oranges," all tracks were previously compiled on the Pink Floyd compilation album Relics in 1971 (albeit with some mixing variations). The duophonic mixes of "Arnold Layne" and "See Emily Play" from Relics would later resurface on the 1983 compilation Works. The proper mono mixes of these two tracks would later appear on Echoes: The Best of Pink Floyd in 2001, with the latter reappearing on The Best of Pink Floyd: A Foot in the Door in 2011.

The original mono mixes of all six of these songs were first compiled on The Early Singles, a bonus disc in the 1992 Shine On box set. They would later be issued again on the three-disc, 40th anniversary edition of Piper at the Gates of Dawn in 2007, with "Scarecrow" appearing on the album and the other five tracks appearing on the third disc.

== Track listing ==
All tracks are written by Syd Barrett, except where noted

No.	Title	Writer(s)	Length
1.	"Arnold Layne"		2:55
2.	"Candy and a Currant Bun"		2:46
3.	"See Emily Play"		2:54
4.	"Scarecrow"		2:09
5.	"Apples and Oranges"		3:05
6.	"Paint Box"	Richard Wright	3:47
Total length:			17:39

== Personnel ==
Pink Floyd

- Syd Barrett – guitar, lead vocals (except "Paint Box"), original cover art
- Nick Mason – drums, percussion
- Roger Waters – bass guitar, backing vocals
- Richard Wright – keyboards, backing vocals, lead vocals on "Paint Box"

Additional personnel

- Joe Boyd – production (tracks 1, 2)
- Norman Smith – production (tracks 3−6)
