= The Dark Side of the Moo =

Compilation album (bootleg) by Pink Floyd
- Released: 1986
- Recorded: 1967–1971
- Genres: Psychedelic rock; progressive rock
- Length: 44:23
- Label: Trixie Records
- Producers: Norman Smith; Pink Floyd

The Dark Side of the Moo is a 1986 unofficial compilation of early recordings by the English rock group Pink Floyd, featuring recordings not available on albums released in the US. Unlike other bootlegs containing previously unheard material (bootleg recordings), the album is made up of recordings that had at least one commercial release.

The name parodies The Dark Side of the Moon, the band's most commercially successful album, and the front cover of Atom Heart Mother, which featured a cow.

== Background ==
The album was created by an anonymous label known as "Trixie Records" by a bootlegger known as "Richard", and to avoid detection by authorities, used an early name for the group, "The Screaming Abdabs" on the record label. "Richard" created the bootleg because he was frustrated at the amount of material that had been released by the band but had not found its way onto any widely available album, even compilations such as Relics, or even seen a US release. He said that a key motivation for creating it was for the cover, for which he created his own photograph of a cow in a field.

== Reception ==
Professional ratings
Review scores
Source	Rating
Allmusic	4/5 stars

Reviewing the bootleg, Ritchie Unterberger recommended it for fans trying to complete a collection of Floyd recordings, saying: "If you're not inclined to spend an additional 50 dollars or so tracking these down, it certainly makes sense to spring for this, if you can find it." The record was alleged to have sold 15,000 copies, and was praised for its high fidelity. "Richard" claimed it was the best-selling bootleg out of several he produced, and was still selling it in the mid-1990s, roughly a decade after its release.

Although some of the tracks are now more widely available than when the bootleg was first issued, some have still not been released on a regular album.

== Track listing ==
Side one
No.	Title	Writer(s)	Original release	Length
1.	"Astronomy Domine"	Syd Barrett	The Piper at the Gates of Dawn (UK only)	4:08
2.	"Candy and a Currant Bun"	Barrett	B-side of "Arnold Layne"	2:43
3.	"Apples and Oranges"	Barrett	Single	3:01
4.	"It Would Be So Nice"	Richard Wright	Single	3:41
5.	"Interstellar Overdrive"	Barrett, Roger Waters, Wright, Nick Mason	Tonite Lets All Make Love in London	3:04
6.	"Scream Thy Last Scream"	Barrett	The Early Years 1965–1972	4:44

Side two
No.	Title	Writer(s)	Original release	Length
7.	"Heart Beat, Pig Meat"	Waters, Wright, David Gilmour, Mason	Zabriskie Point	3:09
8.	"Crumbling Land"	Waters, Wright, Gilmour, Mason	Zabriskie Point	4:12
9.	"Embryo"	Waters	Picnic – A Breath of Fresh Air (limited UK release)	4:39
10.	"Point Me at the Sky"	Waters, Gilmour	Single	3:27
11.	"Come in Number 51, Your Time Is Up"	Waters, Wright, Gilmour, Mason	Zabriskie Point	4:57
12.	"Mademoiselle Nobs"	Waters, Wright, Gilmour, Mason	Pink Floyd: Live at Pompeii	1:50
