= The Best of the Pink Floyd =

Greatest hits album by Pink Floyd
- Released: 1970
- Recorded: 1967–1968
- Length: 29:40
- Label: Columbia (EMI)
- Producers: Norman Smith and Joe Boyd

Pink Floyd chronology
Atom Heart Mother (1970)	The Best of the Pink Floyd (1970)	Relics (1971)

Masters of Rock
- First of two covers

Pink Floyd compilation albums chronology
The Best Of Pink Floyd (1970)	Relics (1971)

Professional ratings
Review scores
Source	Rating
Allmusic	2/5 stars

The Best of the Pink Floyd, also issued as Masters of Rock, is a compilation album of early Pink Floyd music, concentrating on singles and album tracks from 1967 to 1968.

== Later release ==
Later editions titled Masters of Rock were released in 1974 in France, Germany, Italy, and the Netherlands, to capitalise on the success of The Dark Side of the Moon. It is one of the Masters of Rock series of budget EMI compilations with identical titles, each volume for a different artist. Two different sleeve designs were used: one (by Herman Baas) based on the picture from the centre of the album sleeve for Meddle, with Syd Barrett's face superimposed over the original photo of David Gilmour, who had not yet joined the band during most of the period covered by the album; And a later edition with the title filling the front cover. The latter edition is titled Masters of Rock, Volume 1; subsequent volumes of Masters of Rock featured other artists.

== Song variations ==
There are no song variations between the original Best of edition and the Masters of Rock LPs. Both The Best of edition and Masters of Rock are made from the same master tape and matrix (5C 054–04299) and were notable for containing the first stereo release of "Apples and Oranges" and "Paintbox", this latter also appearing a year later on Relics.

However, the French edition of Masters of Rock, released in 1974, contains the stereo mix of "Julia Dream" as in Relics.

These albums were also the only LP source of "It Would Be So Nice" prior to the era of CD re-issues and compilations. The version of "It Would Be So Nice" appearing on these albums is the single version, with lyrics mentioning "the Daily Standard" (no known version with "the Evening Standard" has ever been released).

Counterfeit editions with different track lists exist. Any edition with a track list that does not match the list shown here, is a counterfeit.

== Track listing ==
All songs written and sung by Syd Barrett, and taken from singles, except where noted.

Side one
No.	Title	Original release	Length
1.	"Chapter 24"	The Piper at the Gates of Dawn	3:36
2.	"Matilda Mother" (misspelled "Mathilda Mother" on this album)	The Piper at the Gates of Dawn	3:03
3.	"Arnold Layne"	"Arnold Layne" single	2:51
4.	"Candy and a Currant Bun"	"Arnold Layne" single	2:38
5.	"The Scarecrow"	The Piper at the Gates of Dawn/"See Emily Play" single	2:07

Side two
No.	Title	Writer(s)	Original release	Length
6.	"Apples and Oranges" (stereo mix)		"Apples and Oranges" single	3:01
7.	"It Would Be So Nice"	Richard Wright	"It Would Be So Nice" single	3:39
8.	"Paint Box" (stereo mix)	Wright	"Apples and Oranges" single	3:27
9.	"Julia Dream" (original single mono mix reprocessed in duophonic)	Roger Waters	"It Would Be So Nice" single	2:28
10.	"See Emily Play"		"See Emily Play" single	2:50
Total length:				29:40

== Personnel ==
- Syd Barrett – guitar (all but 7, 9), lead vocals (all but 7, 8, 9), backing vocals
- David Gilmour – guitar (7, 9), lead vocals (9), backing vocals (uncredited)
- Nick Mason – drums, percussion
- Roger Waters – bass guitar, gong (1), backing vocals
- Richard Wright – keyboards, piano, organ, mellotron (7, 9), cello (1, 5), flute (5), harmonium (1), electric harpsichord (10), recorder (7), lead vocals (2, 7, 8), backing vocals (however erroneously credited for playing bass guitar)

== Certifications ==
Region	Certification	Certified units/sales
France (SNEP)	Gold	100,000^{*}
^{*} Sales figures based on certification alone.
