= Shine On (Pink Floyd box set) =

Box set by Pink Floyd
- Released: 2 November 1992
- Recorded: 1967–1987
- Genres: Progressive rock; psychedelic rock
- Length: 380:15
- Label: EMI
- Producers: Joe Boyd; Bob Ezrin; David Gilmour; James Guthrie; Pink Floyd; Norman Smith; Roger Waters

Pink Floyd chronology
Delicate Sound of Thunder (1988)	Shine On (1992)	The Division Bell (1994)

Professional ratings
Review scores
Source	Rating
AllMusic	4.5/5 stars
The Encyclopedia of Popular Music	4/5 stars

Shine On is a nine-CD box set by the English rock band Pink Floyd, released in 1992 through EMI Records in the UK and Columbia Records in the US, to coincide with Pink Floyd's 25th anniversary as a recording and touring band. All CDs were digitally remastered.

== Content ==
The eight albums included in this box set are:

- A Saucerful of Secrets
- Meddle
- The Dark Side of the Moon
- Wish You Were Here
- Animals
- The Wall
- A Momentary Lapse of Reason
- The Early Singles (bonus CD, unavailable elsewhere)

The packaging on each of the previously released albums was unique to this set, with each CD housed in a solid black jewel case with a small sticker of the album cover affixed to the front. When lined up in order of release, the spines of the eight CD cases displayed the prism image from the cover of The Dark Side of the Moon.

Included with the box set was a hardcover book chronicling the career of Pink Floyd, from its inception to the late 1980s, and an envelope of postcards depicting artwork from the included seven albums and the cover of the box set itself.

As the collection was meant to showcase the best of Pink Floyd, the decision was made to not include the soundtrack albums More or Obscured by Clouds, or the albums Ummagumma, Atom Heart Mother and The Final Cut. The band's first album, The Piper at the Gates of Dawn, was also omitted, as EMI were planning to release a special edition of the album at the time, and it was hoped that new fans would buy both this set and the re-released debut album.

David Gilmour said the title of the Shine On box set (taken from the Wish You Were Here track "Shine On You Crazy Diamond") was not meant to indicate retirement on the band's part but rather a continuation of the band's progress. According to drummer Nick Mason, an initial suggestion for the title of the set was The Big Bong Theory.

=== The Early Singles ===
Shine On contained a bonus CD which compiled, for the first time ever, the band's first five 7" single A- and B-sides, in their original mono mixes. Some promotional copies of the disc were also issued separately to radio stations. Unlike the other discs in the box set, The Early Singles was housed in a digipak case.

==== Track listing ====
No.	Title	Music	Length
1.	"Arnold Layne"	Syd Barrett	2:57
2.	"Candy and a Currant Bun"	Barrett	2:47
3.	"See Emily Play"	Barrett	2:54
4.	"The Scarecrow"	Barrett	2:10
5.	"Apples and Oranges"	Barrett	3:08
6.	"Paint Box"	Richard Wright	3:47
7.	"It Would Be So Nice"	Wright	3:46
8.	"Julia Dream"	Roger Waters	2:35
9.	"Point Me at the Sky"	Waters, David Gilmour	3:35
10.	"Careful with That Axe, Eugene"	Gilmour, Waters, Wright, Nick Mason	5:54
Total length:			33:33

==== Original release dates ====
- Tracks 1 & 2: 10 March 1967
- Tracks 3 & 4: 16 June 1967
- Tracks 5 & 6: 17 November 1967
- Tracks 7 & 8: 19 April 1968
- Tracks 9 & 10: 6 December 1968

== Personnel ==
- Richard Wright – piano; organ; mellotron on 7, 8; vibraphone on 10; vocals on 6, 7; backing vocals on 1, 2, 3, 4, 5, 8, 9
- Syd Barrett – guitar on 1 to 6; vocals on 1 to 5; backing vocals on 6
- David Gilmour – guitar on 7 to 10; vocals on 8, 9, 10; backing vocals on 7
- Roger Waters – bass guitar; vocals on 9, 10; backing vocals on 2, 3, 5, 6, 7, 8
- Nick Mason – drums, percussion

Production

- James Guthrie – remastering production
- Alan Parsons – assistant remastering on the included release of The Dark Side of the Moon
- Aubrey Powell – sleeve design
- Doug Sax – remastering
- Storm Thorgerson – sleeve design
