= Games for May =

Pink Floyd concert

Games for May was a rock music concert that took place at the Queen Elizabeth Hall on 12 May 1967, three months after the venue opened. It was one of the first significant concert events held by Pink Floyd. The show was organized by Pink Floyd managers Andrew King and Peter Jenner of Blackhill Enterprises, and promoted by classical music promoter Christopher Hunt.

== History ==
Games for May was described as a "Space age relaxation for the climax of spring – electronic composition, colour and image projection, girls, and the Pink Floyd". The concert featured some of the band's early singles as well as material from their yet-to-be-released debut album – The Piper at the Gates of Dawn. During the performance, some of the band members created sound effects by chopping up wood on stage, a man dressed up as an admiral gave out daffodils, and the bubbles produced from a machine while the show was in progress stained all the furniture in the hall. As a consequence, Pink Floyd were banned from ever playing there again.

It was the first concert in Britain to feature both a complex light show and a four channel quadraphonic surround sound speaker system. A sound mixing device called the "Azimuth Co-ordinator" was used to direct sounds to multiple speakers all around the room. Live music was supplemented with sounds from pre-recorded tapes. Roger Waters created the opening dawn tape effects by using bird calls and other natural sounds (an effect he later used on "Cirrus Minor" and "Grantchester Meadows"). The bubbling sounds at the end of the show were created by Rick Wright while the ending piece was constructed by Barrett. At this time, the song that would become "See Emily Play" was known as "Games for May."

== Setlist ==
The following songs were performed at the show (all songs written by Syd Barrett, unless otherwise noted)

- Dawn (tape recording)
- "Matilda Mother"
- "Flaming"
- "The Scarecrow"
- "Games for May"
- "Bike"
- "Arnold Layne"
- "Candy and a Currant Bun"
- "Pow R. Toc H." (Barrett, Waters, Wright, Mason)
- "Interstellar Overdrive" (Barrett, Waters, Wright, Mason)
- Bubbles (tape recording)
- Ending (tape recording)

Encore:

- "Lucifer Sam"

== See also ==
- The 14 Hour Technicolor Dream
