= Lucy Leave =

1965 single by Pink Floyd

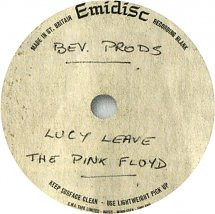

Single by Pink Floyd

from the EP 1965: Their First Recordings
- A-side: "Lucy Leave"
- B-side: "I'm a King Bee"
- Written: Late 1964
- Released: November 27, 2015
- Recorded: December 1964 – January 1965
- Genre: Rock and roll, British R&B, rock, garage rock
- Length: 2:58
- Songwriter: Syd Barrett

"Lucy Leave" is a song by the English rock band Pink Floyd. The song is one of the first written and recorded by the band and was not released until 2015 in the EP 1965: Their First Recordings and in 2016 in The Early Years 1965–1972 box set. The song was featured on the 1965–1967 CAMBRIDGE ST/ATION CD as the first track and featured most of Pink Floyd's original lineup of Syd Barrett, Roger Waters, Nick Mason and Bob Klose.

== Writing and recording ==
Lucy Leave was written in early 1965 (although Nick Mason wrote that it was written in December 1964) by Syd Barrett. The song is about a relationship with a girlfriend, expressing the desire to break up while simultaneously being clingy and affectionate towards her. This was one of the first songs written by the band which was called 'The Tea Set' at the time. Barrett played rhythm guitar and was on vocals, Waters was on bass guitar, Mason on drums and Klose on lead solo guitar, the song did not feature Richard Wright playing keyboard. "Lucy Leave" was released unofficially as a single without a label, The B-side featured the song "I'm A King Bee". Both songs were recorded around the same time.

In Echoes : The Complete History of Pink Floyd, Glenn Povey writes that "Lucy Leave" "shows the band performing a very straightforward R&B style". In Reinventing Pink Floyd : From Syd Barrett to the Dark Side of the Moon, Bill Kopp further states the song is "based upon a familiar R&B melodic line" but is nevertheless distinctive due to its "start-and-stop sections of the melody [...] and the slightly non-standard [...] chord choices".

== Music ==
The song has a simple chord sequence, the intro goes from the chords E7, D, C and then the main chords which are E and A repeating. The chorus has C, D and B as the chords. For most of the song, a riff is played by Bob Klose, and a main guitar solo is played after the 3rd verse.

== Personnel ==
- Syd Barrett – rhythm guitar, vocals
- Bob Klose – lead guitar
- Roger Waters – bass guitar
- Nick Mason – drums

== See also ==
- Arnold Layne
- See Emily Play
