= Cirrus Minor =

Cirrus Minor may refer to:

- A small (minor) cloud (cirrus)
- Blackburn Cirrus Minor, a British aircraft engine
- Cirrus Minor (song), song by Pink Floyd
