= The Best of Pink Floyd: A Foot in the Door =

Greatest hits album by Pink Floyd
- Released: 7 November 2011
- Recorded: 1967–1993
- Genres: Progressive rock, psychedelic rock
- Length: 79:39
- Label: EMI
- Producers: James Guthrie; Pink Floyd
- Compilers: David Gilmour; Nick Mason; Roger Waters

Pink Floyd chronology
Pink Floyd: Discovery (2011)	The Best of Pink Floyd: A Foot in the Door (2011)	The Endless River (2014)

Professional ratings
Review scores
Source	Rating
AllMusic	4/5 stars

The Best of Pink Floyd: A Foot in the Door is a greatest hits album by the English rock band Pink Floyd, that was released as part of the Why Pink Floyd...? 2011–12 remastering campaign. It was later released on vinyl on 26 September 2018.

== Track listing ==
No.	Title	Writer(s)	Original album	Length
1.	"Hey You"	Roger Waters	The Wall (1979)	4:40
2.	"See Emily Play"	Syd Barrett	Non-album single (1967); appears on Relics (1971) and original US/Japan versions of The Piper at the Gates of Dawn (1967)	2:48
3.	"The Happiest Days of Our Lives"	Waters	The Wall	1:32
4.	"Another Brick in the Wall (Part 2)"	Waters	The Wall	3:48
5.	"Have a Cigar"	Waters	Wish You Were Here (1975)	5:08
6.	"Wish You Were Here"	David Gilmour, Waters	Wish You Were Here	5:05
7.	"Time" (edited version on CD, full version on vinyl)	Gilmour, Nick Mason, Waters, Richard Wright	The Dark Side of the Moon (1973)	6:20
8.	"The Great Gig in the Sky"	Wright, Clare Torry	The Dark Side of the Moon	4:36
9.	"Money"	Waters	The Dark Side of the Moon	6:34
10.	"Comfortably Numb"	Gilmour, Waters	The Wall	6:19
11.	"High Hopes" (edited version)	Gilmour, Polly Samson	The Division Bell (1994)	6:55
12.	"Learning to Fly"	Gilmour, Anthony Moore, Bob Ezrin, Jon Carin	A Momentary Lapse of Reason (1987)	4:49
13.	"The Fletcher Memorial Home"	Waters	The Final Cut (1983)	4:11
14.	"Shine On You Crazy Diamond" (edited version of parts 1–5)	Wright, Waters, Gilmour	Wish You Were Here	11:05
15.	"Brain Damage"	Waters	The Dark Side of the Moon	3:46
16.	"Eclipse" (early fade-out)	Waters	The Dark Side of the Moon	1:53
Total length:				79:39

== Charts ==
=== Weekly charts ===
Chart (2011)	Peak position
Austrian Albums (Ö3 Austria)	25
Belgian Albums (Ultratop Wallonia)	16
Canadian Albums Chart	22
Croatian Foreign Albums Chart	14
French Albums (SNEP)	28
Greek Albums Chart	21
Hungarian Albums (MAHASZ)	34
Irish Albums Chart	14
Italian Albums (FIMI)	4
Mexican Albums (Top 100 Mexico)	72
New Zealand Albums (RMNZ)	8
Polish Albums (ZPAV)	16
Portuguese Albums (AFP)	10
Scottish Albums Chart	12
Spanish Albums (Promusicae)	27
Swedish Albums (Sverigetopplistan)	7
Swiss Albums (Schweizer Hitparade)	23
UK Albums (Official Charts)	14
US Billboard 200	50

Chart (2012)	Peak position
Australian Albums Chart	15
Belgian (Flanders) Albums Chart	23
Danish Albums Chart	11
Dutch Albums Chart	21
Norwegian Albums Chart	4
UK Rock & Metal Albums (Official Charts)	4

Chart (2024)	Peak position
Greek Albums (IFPI)	14

=== Year-end charts ===
Chart (2011)	Peak position
Australian Albums Chart	64
Danish Albums Chart	47

== Certifications ==
Region	Certification	Certified units/sales
Australia (ARIA)	Platinum	70,000^{‡}
France (SNEP)	Gold	50,000^{*}
Italy (FIMI)	2× Platinum	100,000^{‡}
New Zealand (RMNZ)	Platinum	15,000^{^}
Poland (ZPAV)	Platinum	20,000^{‡}
Portugal (AFP)	Gold	7,500^{^}
United Kingdom (BPI)	2× Platinum	600,000^{‡}
^{*} Sales figures based on certification alone.^{^} Shipments figures based on certification alone.^{‡} Sales+streaming figures based on certification alone.
