= Julia Dream =

Single by Pink Floyd
- A-side: "It Would Be So Nice"
- Released: 12 April 1968
- Recorded: 13 February 1968
- Studio: Abbey Road Studios, London, UK
- Genre: Psychedelic rock
- Length: 2:37
- Label: Columbia (EMI) (UK); Tower/Capitol (US)
- Songwriter: Roger Waters
- Producer: Norman Smith

Pink Floyd singles chronology
| "Apples and Oranges" (1967) | "Julia Dream" (1968) | "Let There Be More Light" (1968) |

Official audio
- "Julia Dream" on YouTube

"Julia Dream" is a song by the English rock band Pink Floyd and the B-side of the single "It Would Be So Nice". The song was released in April 1968 and was the first by the band with lead vocals by David Gilmour.

== Writing ==
Written by bassist Roger Waters, "Julia Dream" is characterised by the slow tempo, the airy, ambient Mellotron sounds from keyboardist Richard Wright and lush chorus vocals.

The song's lyrics include reference to an eiderdown, an item also mentioned in two other known Pink Floyd songs – Syd Barrett's "Flaming" and Gilmour/Waters's "A Pillow of Winds". The phrase "Am I really dying" would reappear in the version of the song "Mother" re-recorded for the film "Pink Floyd – The Wall".

== Later release ==
The song was later included on several compilation albums: The Early Years 1965–1972 box, The Best of the Pink Floyd, Relics, and The Early Singles disc, which was included in the Shine On box set.

== Personnel ==
- David Gilmour – vocals, acoustic guitar, electric slide guitar
- Richard Wright – Mellotron, organ
- Roger Waters – bass
- Nick Mason – percussion

== Covers ==
Mostly Autumn covered this song on their 2005 live DVD Pink Floyd Revisited.

Shadow Gallery covered this song on their medley "Floydian Memories", found in the special edition of their 2005 Room V album.

Mark Lanegan used to cover this song during his acoustic tour in 2010.

Acid Mothers Temple covers this song on their 2011 live acoustic album Live as a Troubadour.

All India Radio released a cover of this song on SoundCloud in 2019.
