= Works (Pink Floyd album) =

Compilation album by Pink Floyd
- Released: June 1983
- Recorded: 1967–1973
- Genre: Progressive rock; psychedelic rock
- Length: 42:10
- Label: Capitol
- Producer: Joe Boyd; Pink Floyd; Norman Smith

Pink Floyd chronology
The Final Cut (1983)	Works (1983)	A Momentary Lapse of Reason (1987)

Pink Floyd compilation albums chronology
A Collection of Great Dance Songs (1981)	Works (1983)	1967: The First Three Singles (1997)

Works is a compilation album of songs by the English rock band Pink Floyd, released in June 1983 by Capitol Records. It features a variety of material, including two of the band's early singles "Arnold Layne" and "See Emily Play", alternative mixes of tracks from The Dark Side of the Moon (1973) and the studio outtake "Embryo".

== Release and contents ==
Professional ratings
Review scores
Source	Rating
Allmusic	2/5 stars
The Encyclopedia of Popular Music	3/5 stars
Rolling Stone	3/5 stars

The album was released by Pink Floyd's former American label, Capitol Records, to compete with their then-current studio album The Final Cut. The album is particularly notable for including the track "Embryo", an outtake from the Ummagumma album that later became a concert staple in a greatly elongated form. Previously, the track had only appeared on a scarce various artists compilation album promoting Pink Floyd's UK label Harvest Records entitled Picnic – A Breath of Fresh Air in January 1970.

Some tracks are crossfaded into one another, such as "See Emily Play" into "Several Species ..." and "Fearless" into "Brain Damage". The album also opens with a heartbeat similar to the opening of Dark Side of the Moon that fades into the wind intro of "One of These Days". This creates a bookend effect on side 1, which ends with the heartbeat fadeout of "Eclipse".

== Cover ==
The cover art, illustrated by Ron Larson, was inspired by the c. 1948 poster "Nederland industrialiseert" ("The Netherlands industrialise"), designed by Dutch graphic artist Wladimir Flem.

== Track listing ==
Side one

No.	Title	Original release	Length
1.	"One of These Days" (re-mix; interpolates part of "Speak to Me" from The Dark Side of the Moon)	Meddle	5:50
2.	"Arnold Layne" (Duophonic stereo)	Single	2:52
3.	"Fearless"	Meddle	6:08
4.	"Brain Damage" (Alternate mix)	The Dark Side of the Moon	3:50
5.	"Eclipse" (Alternate mix)	The Dark Side of the Moon	1:45
Total length:			20:25

Side two

No.	Title	Original release	Length
1.	"Set the Controls for the Heart of the Sun" (The album cover erroneously lists the track as from Ummagumma)	A Saucerful of Secrets	5:23
2.	"See Emily Play" (Duophonic stereo)	Single	2:54
3.	"Several Species of Small Furry Animals Gathered Together in a Cave and Grooving with a Pict"	Ummagumma	4:47
4.	"Free Four"	Obscured by Clouds	4:07
5.	"Embryo"	Picnic – A Breath of Fresh Air	4:39
Total length:			21:50

== Personnel ==
- Syd Barrett — guitar ("Arnold Layne", "Set the Controls ...", "See Emily Play"), lead vocals ("Arnold Layne", "See Emily Play")
- David Gilmour — guitar (all but "Arnold Layne", "See Emily Play", "Several Species ..."), bass guitar ("One of These Days"), lead vocals ("Fearless", "Embryo"), backing vocals
- Nick Mason — drums, percussion, tape effects, vocalisations ("One of These Days")
- Roger Waters — bass guitar, tape effects, lead vocals ("Brain Damage", "Eclipse", "Set the Controls ...", "Free Four"), vocalisations ("Several Species ..."), backing vocals
- Richard Wright — keyboards, piano, synthesisers, backing vocals

== Charts ==
Chart (1983)	Peak position
Australia (Kent Music Report)	64
US Billboard 200	68
