= Bob Klose =

British photographer

- Born: Rado Robert Garcia Klose; 30 June 1945 (age 81); Cambridge, England
- Genres: Rock; blues; R&B; jazz; psychedelic; electronic
- Occupations: Photographer; Printmaker; Musician
- Instrument: Guitar
- Years active: 1964–present
- Formerly of: The Tea Set; David Gilmour; Syd Barrett; Smith & Mudd
- Website: radoklose.com

Rado Robert Garcia Klose (born 30 June 1945) is an English musician, photographer and printmaker. Between 1964 and July 1965, he was the lead guitarist of the first incarnation of Pink Floyd. Although he recorded a few songs with that band, he left before their transformation into Pink Floyd. However, on the band's official Facebook page, he has been repeatedly mentioned when discussing the band and their tenure as the Tea Set.

== Name confusion ==
Klose's full birth name is Rado Robert Klose or Rado Robert Garcia Klose, with some authors wronglyciting Radovan as his full given name. During the 1960s he was commonly known as Bob Klose, which was often misspelt Bob Close or occasionally even Brian Close. On the official Pink Floyd website, he is listed as Klose, Radovan 'Bob'.

== Biography ==
Klose was born on 30 June 1945 in Cambridge. His father was a refugee from Nazi Germany and a tent on a farm where Klose's father worked for a couple of years until moving to a small Cambridgeshire village.After village school, Klose attended school in Cambridge, where he met Syd Barrett and Roger Waters. He later moved to London to study architecture and then science at the Regent Street Polytechnic, before abandoning studies to completely devote himself to photography in the late 1960s.

=== Early musical career ===
During his architectural studies, Klose started playing lead guitar in a band with Roger Waters (guitar), Richard Wright (rhythm guitar), Nick Mason (drums). The band performed rhythm and blues under various names ("Sigma 6", "the Meggadeaths", "the Abdabs", and "the Screaming Abdabs"), during their run with manager Ken Chapman, who also wrote some early material for the band.

Metcalfe, Noble and Gale left the band (though Gale would go on to marry Richard Wright). By the time they left, the line-up included Syd Barrett (rhythm guitar and vocals) and Bob Klose (lead guitar and vocals), with Roger Waters on bass and vocals, Richard Wright on organ and vocals and Nick Mason on drums. This new group used various names, often fluctuating between "Tea Set" and "the Pink Floyd Sound" (named after two old Carolina bluesmen, Pink Anderson and Floyd Council). The word "Sound" was dropped from the band's name, with the definite article disappearing a few years later.

Klose was more focused on his studies than on the band and was more interested in jazz and blues than Barrett's psychedelia and pop, so he left the band sometime around July 1965. Barrett assumed lead guitar, lead vocals, and the bulk of the songwriting, while Klose went on to become a photographer and print maker.

'While we were at the Poly (Regent Street Polytechnic) we had various people in and out of the band and one particular, very good guitar player Bob Klose. He was really a far better musician than any of the rest of us. But I think he had some exam problems and really felt that he had to apply himself to work, whereas the rest of us were not that conscientious. And so he was sort of out of the band and we were looking for another guitar player and we knew that Syd was coming up to London from Cambridge and so he just, well he was just co-opted into the whole thing.'

— Richard Wright

=== Later years ===
Klose confirmed in John Edginton's BBC documentary The Pink Floyd and Syd Barrett Story (2001) that his guitar can be heard on the unreleased early acetate single "Lucy Leave"/"I'm a King Bee". In the documentary he also talked about Syd Barrett: "If you had said to a young Syd, 'Look, this is your bargain in life, you know, you're going to do this fantastic stuff, but it won't be forever, it'll be this short period. There's the dotted line, are you going to sign for this?' I suspect, maybe, a lot of people would sign for that, for making their mark." The two songs were eventually released, with Klose credited as "Rado Klose", in 1965: Their First Recordings (2015)

In 2006, Klose wrote an accompanying essay for a picture book of previously unpublished Rowland Hilder's watercolour paintings, entitled Rowland Hilder's British Isles.

Klose appeared as a guest performer on David Gilmour's 2006 album On an Island (credited as "Rado Klose" rather than his former professional name "Bob Klose"). The same year, he appeared on Paul "Mudd" Murphy's album Claremont 56, as well as Chico Hamilton's album Juniflip, on which he is also listed as a co-writer of one of the songs ("Kerry's Caravan"). On both of these albums, he is credited as "Bob Klose".

In 2007, he took part in BBC Radio 2's programme Days in the Life, which was dedicated to Pink Floyd. In the first part of this show, he spoke about early days with Barrett.

He also played on Blue River, a 2007 electronic album by Smith & Mudd, a collaboration between Paul "Mudd" Murphy and multi-instrumentalist/producer Benjamin James Smith.

In 2015, Klose appeared as a guitarist on David Gilmour's album Rattle That Lock.

== Discography ==
- The Tea Set – "I'm a King Bee"/"Lucy Leave" (1964) – released on 1965: Their First Recordings (2015) under Pink Floyd name
- Keith Noble – Mr. Compromise (1970)
- David Gilmour – On an Island (2006)
- Mudd – Claremont 56 (2006)
- Chico Hamilton – Juniflip (2006)
- V/A – This Rong Music (2006) – with Chico Hamilton
- Smith & Mudd – Blue River (2007)
- V/A – Bargrooves: Over Ice (2009) – with Smith & Mudd
- David Gilmour – Rattle That Lock (2015)

== Bibliography ==
- Rowland Hilder's British Isles (2006). A&C Black. ISBN 978-0-7136-7937-3
