= Cirrus Minor (song) =

Song by Pink Floyd

from the album Soundtrack from the Film More
- Released: 13 June 1969
- Recorded: March 1969
- Genre: Psychedelic folk; space rock; ambient
- Length: 5:18
- Label: EMI Columbia (UK); Tower (US)
- Songwriter: Roger Waters
- Producer: Pink Floyd

"Cirrus Minor" is a song written and performed by Pink Floyd. It is the first track on their 1969 album Soundtrack from the Film More. The song would later be released on the compilation album Relics.

== Writing and recording ==
The song is 5 minutes 18 seconds long. It was written by Roger Waters and performed by David Gilmour on vocals and guitar and Rick Wright on organ. The song has a hallucinogenic, pastoral quality, with prominent organ and bird sound effects, like those later that year featured on the Ummagumma track "Grantchester Meadows". It was also included on Pink Floyd's compilation album Relics. The song features no drums. The Hammond and Farfisa organ coda is similar to that found on the "Celestial Voices" section of "A Saucerful of Secrets". While the Hammond provides a stately foundation with an Em-Bm-D-A-G-D-B sequence, about 1/4 way into the coda Wright introduces the Farfisa which, run through a Binson Echorec platter echo, produces the swirly, trembly, echoey sound that hovers over the Hammond.

The opening birdsong is from a 1961 recording entitled "Dawn Chorus" and the single bird featured over the organ part is a nightingale also from 1961. Both featured on an His Master's Voice sound effects single (together with a recording of owls) but presumably the band just borrowed the originals from the EMI sound effects library as EMI owned His Master's Voice.

== Music ==
"Cirrus Minor" has an unusual chord sequence: E minor, E flat augmented, G major, C♯ minor 7, C major 7, C minor 7 and B 7. The chords are built around the chromatically descending bass line. The B 7, C major 7 and G major chords are the only chords which fit into the functional context of the E minor key. This chord sequence gives the song a surreal atmosphere.

== Personnel ==
- David Gilmour – acoustic guitar, double-tracked vocals
- Richard Wright – Farfisa organ, Hammond organ
- Roger Waters – bass (at the end of the song), birdsong effects

== Covers ==
"Cirrus Minor" was covered by the French artist Étienne Daho on his 2007 album, Be My Guest Tonight.
