= 1965: Their First Recordings =

EP by Pink Floyd
- Released: 27 November 2015
- Recorded: December 1964 – January 1965
- Genres: Psychedelic rock; rhythm and blues
- Length: 18:20
- Label: Parlophone

Pink Floyd chronology
The Endless River (2014)	1965: Their First Recordings (2015)	The Early Years 1965–1972 (2016)

1965: Their First Recordings is an EP by Pink Floyd released in 2015. It is made up of music recorded around Christmas 1964, at which time the band was known as the Tea Set. These are the earliest Pink Floyd recordings available commercially, with four songs written by Syd Barrett, one written by Roger Waters, and one cover of a song by American blues musician Slim Harpo.

The drums and guitars were recorded "straight off", while the vocals and piano were recorded at a later date. It was released as a special edition set of two 7" vinyl records, limited to 1,050 copies (1,000 retail and 50 promotional) available only in the EU, to extend the copyright of the recordings. These are the only officially released songs featuring guitarist Rado Klose and Juliette Gale, first wife of keyboardist Richard Wright. The tracks were later included in the box set The Early Years 1965–1972.

== Track listing ==
All vocals by Syd Barrett, except for "Walk with Me Sydney" by Syd Barrett, Juliette Gale and Roger Waters.

All tracks are written by Syd Barrett, except where noted.

Record 1, Side A
No.	Title	Length
1.	"Lucy Leave"	2:53

Record 1, Side B
No.	Title	Length
1.	"Double O Bo"	3:25
2.	"Remember Me"	2:45

Record 2, Side A
No.	Title	Writer(s)	Length
1.	"Walk with Me Sydney"	Roger Waters	3:11

Record 2, Side B
No.	Title	Writer(s)	Length
1.	"Butterfly"		2:59
2.	"I'm a King Bee"	Slim Harpo	3:07
Total length:			18:20

== Personnel ==
The Tea Set

- Syd Barrett – lead vocals (1–3, 5, 6), electric guitar
- Rado Klose – electric guitar
- Roger Waters – bass guitar, backing vocals, co-lead vocals on "Walk with Me Sydney"
- Richard Wright – piano, organ (tracks 3–6)
- Nick Mason – drums

Additional personnel

- Juliette Gale – co-lead vocals on "Walk with Me Sydney"

Production

- Andy Jackson – mastering
- Ray Staff – mastering
