= A Collection of Great Dance Songs =

Greatest hits album by Pink Floyd
- Released: 23 November 1981
- Recorded: January–August 1971; January–July 1975; April–December 1976; April–November 1979; 1981
- Genre: Progressive rock
- Length: 43:01
- Label: Harvest
- Producers: Pink Floyd; Roger Waters; David Gilmour; James Guthrie; Bob Ezrin

Pink Floyd chronology
The Wall (1979)	A Collection of Great Dance Songs (1981)	The Final Cut (1983)

Pink Floyd compilation albums chronology
A Nice Pair (1973)	A Collection of Great Dance Songs (1981)	Works (1983)

Singles from A Collection of Great Dance Songs
- 1. "Money" Released: December 1981

A Collection of Great Dance Songs is a compilation album by the English rock band Pink Floyd. It was released on 23 November 1981 in the United Kingdom by Harvest Records and in the United States by Columbia Records.

== Content ==
The album contains alternative mixes of "Shine On You Crazy Diamond" (comprised parts 1, 2, 4 and 7) and "Another Brick in the Wall (Part 2)".

"Money" was entirely re-recorded, as Capitol Records refused to license the track to Columbia/CBS Records. David Gilmour re-recorded the track himself, playing most of the instruments, and co-produced the song with James Guthrie. Dick Parry reprised his saxophone parts on the track.

== Title and packaging ==
The ironic title was a reference to the disco rhythms of "Another Brick in the Wall (Part 2)", as well as Nick Mason's joke that the band's U.S. label "probably thought they were a dance band". The album art featured a photograph of ballroom dancers anchored to the ground so they cannot move. The inner sleeve had pictures of dancers on either a white (UK) or black (US) background.

== Release and reception ==
Professional ratings
Review scores
Source	Rating
AllMusic	2/5 stars
Christgau's Record Guide	B+
The Encyclopedia of Popular Music	2/5 stars
Louder Sound	6/10
MusicHound Rock	1/5 stars
The Rolling Stone Album Guide	3/5 stars

The album was certified Gold by the RIAA on 29 January 1982 and Platinum on 6 July 1989 and Double Platinum in August 2001. The album reached number 37 on the United Kingdom charts and number 31 in the United States. Columbia issued the remastered CD in 1997 in the US and most of the world save Europe. Then a 1997 remastered CD was re-released in 2000 on Capitol Records in the US and EMI for the rest of the world including Europe. The album was released once again in 2016 under the band's Pink Floyd Records imprint, distributed by Sony Music internationally and by Warner Music in Europe, and was released on LP as well as CD.

Reviewing in Christgau's Record Guide: The '80s (1990), Robert Christgau said of the album: "With the rerecorded 'Money' sporting a livelier bottom to protect them from truth-in-titling and felonious injury charges, this gathers up their tuneful moments, which have always been far between – so far between, in fact, that even the unconverted may miss the ersatz symphonic structures in which they're properly embedded." Rob Sheffield was less enthusiastic in The Rolling Stone Album Guide (2004), writing that both this compilation and the next, 1983's Works, are "pointless 'hits' collections from a band that disdained hits".

== Track listing ==
=== Original LP ===
All tracks written or co-written by Roger Waters, co-writers listed below.

Side one
No.	Title	Writer(s)	Original album	Length
1.	"One of These Days"	David Gilmour; Richard Wright; Nick Mason	Meddle	5:50
2.	"Money" (Re-recorded in 1981 at New Roydonia Studios)		The Dark Side of the Moon	6:46
3.	"Sheep"		Animals	10:25
Total length:				23:01

Side two
No.	Title	Writer(s)	Original album	Length
1.	"Shine On You Crazy Diamond" (edit)	Gilmour; Wright	Wish You Were Here	10:41
2.	"Wish You Were Here"	Gilmour	Wish You Were Here	5:26
3.	"Another Brick in the Wall (Part II)" (edit)		The Wall	3:53
Total length:				20:00

=== 8-track cartridge ===
Program 1

1. "One of These Days"
2. "Wish You Were Here"

Program 2

3. "Sheep"

Program 3

4. "Shine On You Crazy Diamond" (Edit)

Program 4

5. "Money" (1981 re-recording)
6. "Another Brick in the Wall (Part 2)" (Edit)

== Personnel ==
Pink Floyd

- Roger Waters – bass (except on "Money" and "Sheep"), lead vocals on "Sheep", "Shine On You Crazy Diamond", and "Another Brick in the Wall, Part II", backing vocals, rhythm guitar on "Sheep"
- Richard Wright – keyboards and synthesizers (except on "Money"), backing vocals
- David Gilmour – lead and rhythm guitars, lead vocals on "Wish You Were Here", "Another Brick in the Wall, Part II" and "Money", bass on "One of These Days", "Money" and "Sheep", keyboards on "Money", drums on "Money", backing vocals
- Nick Mason – drums (except on "Money"), vocal phrase on "One of These Days"

Additional personnel

- James Guthrie – remastering production
- The Islington Green School – vocals on "Another Brick in the Wall, Part II"
- Dick Parry – saxophone on "Money"
- Doug Sax – mastering and remastering
- TCP (pseudonym for Hipgnosis) – sleeve design and photos (Storm Thorgerson, Peter Christopherson, and Aubrey "Po" Powell)

== Charts ==
Weekly chart performance for A Collection of Great Dance Songs
Chart (1981–82)	Peak position
Australian Albums (Kent Music Report)	14
Austrian Albums (Ö3 Austria)	18
Canada Top Albums/CDs (RPM)	22
French Albums (SNEP)	8
Dutch Albums (Album Top 100)	6
German Albums (Offizielle Top 100)	36
Italian Albums (Musica e Dischi)	24
New Zealand Albums (RMNZ)	5
Norwegian Albums (VG-lista)	5
UK Albums (Official Charts)	37
US Billboard 200	31

== Certifications ==
Certifications and sales for A Collection of Great Dance Songs
Region	Certification	Certified units/sales
Australia (ARIA)	Platinum	70,000^{^}
Austria (IFPI Austria)	Gold	25,000^{*}
New Zealand (RMNZ)	Gold	7,500^{^}
United Kingdom (BPI)	Gold	100,000^{^}
United States (RIAA)	2× Platinum	2,000,000^{^}
^{*} Sales figures based on certification alone.^{^} Shipments figures based on certification alone.
