= The Scarecrow (song) =

Single by Pink Floyd

from the album The Piper at the Gates of Dawn
- A-side: "See Emily Play"
- Released: 16 June 1967
- Recorded: 22 March 1967
- Studio: Abbey Road, London
- Genre: Psychedelic pop; psychedelic folk
- Length: 2:07(Single); 2:11(Album)
- Label: EMI Columbia (UK); Tower (US)
- Songwriter: Syd Barrett
- Producer: Norman Smith

Pink Floyd singles chronology
"Arnold Layne" (1967)	"The Scarecrow" (1967)	"Apples and Oranges" (1967)

"The Scarecrow" is a song by the English rock band Pink Floyd on their 1967 debut album The Piper at the Gates of Dawn, though it first appeared as the B-side of their second single "See Emily Play" (as "Scarecrow") two months before. It was written by Syd Barrett and recorded in March 1967. This song was one of several to be considered for the band's "best of" album, Echoes: The Best of Pink Floyd.

== History ==
The song contains nascent existentialist themes, as Barrett compares his own existence to that of the scarecrow, who, while "sadder" is also "resigned to his fate". Such thematic content would later become a mainstay of the band's lyrical imagery. The song contains a baroque, psychedelic folk instrumental section consisting of 12-string acoustic guitar and cello. Reflecting the experimental nature of many of the band's early psychedelic pieces, all instruments are panned to the extreme left hand and right hand sides of the stereo, with two vocal lines, one spoken and one sung. The US single (Tower 356) was released by Tower Records three times between July 1967 and late 1968. Each time it failed to duplicate its UK success.

== Music videos ==
A promotional film for the song, made for a Pathé newsreel and filmed in early July 1967, features the band in an open field with a scarecrow, generally fooling around. It shows Roger Waters falling down as if he were shot, and Nick Mason exchanging his hat with the scarecrow's. The pond where Syd plants the scarecrow is located at the junction of Hadley Green Road and Great North Road in Barnet, London. Part of this film has been featured in Waters' live performances of "Set the Controls for the Heart of the Sun".

A second promo was filmed in 1968 in Brussels, Belgium, with David Gilmour replacing Barrett, and Waters lip-syncing while playing his Rickenbacker bass with a violin bow.

== Cover versions ==
The industrial band Rx covered "The Scarecrow" on their album Bedside Toxicology. The vocals for the cover were provided by Nivek Ogre from Skinny Puppy.

== Personnel ==
- Syd Barrett – lead vocals, electric guitar, 6 & 12-string acoustic guitars
- Richard Wright – Farfisa organ, cello, backing vocals
- Roger Waters – bass guitar, bowed bass
- Nick Mason – temple blocks, metal cups
