= Paint Box =

1967 song by Pink Floyd

- French single cover

Single by Pink Floyd
- A-side: "Apples and Oranges"
- Released: 18 November 1967
- Recorded: October 1967
- Studio: De Lane Lea, London
- Genre: Psychedelic pop
- Length: 3:33
- Label: Columbia (EMI)
- Songwriter: Richard Wright
- Producer: Norman Smith

Pink Floyd singles chronology
| "Flaming" (1967) | "Apples and Oranges" / "Paint Box" (1967) | "It Would Be So Nice" (1968) |

Music video
- "Paint Box" on YouTube

"Paint Box" (or "Paintbox" on later reissues) is a song by the English rock band Pink Floyd, written and sung by keyboardist Richard Wright. It was first released in 1967 as the B-side to the single "Apples and Oranges". The song is about a man who lives in an abusive relationship and has artificial friends.

== Lyrics and music ==
Musical features of the song include its long drum fills by Nick Mason, and a piano solo by Wright, which is panned around the stereo spectrum. Wright also doubles on tack piano in addition to the ordinary acoustic piano.

The song's lyrics begin with "Last night I had too much to drink / Sitting in a club with so many fools", and feature an ambivalent chorus: "I open the door to an empty room / Then I forget".

The song is the first of many Pink Floyd songs to prominently feature an E minor added ninth chord. This chord would become a signature aspect of their better-known material: It opens The Dark Side of the Moon with "Breathe". It is prominent in "Welcome to the Machine" from Wish You Were Here, where it alternates with a C Major seventh chord for most of the song. "Dogs" from Animals centres around the chord as played on down-tuned guitars, resulting in a concert pitch of D minor ninth. It appeared again in "Hey You" and "Vera" from The Wall. It would appear in no less than four songs from The Final Cut: "Your Possible Pasts"; "The Hero's Return"; "The Gunner's Dream"; and "The Fletcher Memorial Home".

== Release ==
"Paint Box" was originally issued in mono for the single. A stereo mix was later included on the Masters of Rock compilation, and on the compilation album Relics as "Paintbox". The one-word spelling was also used when the mono mix was issued on the third disc of the 40th Anniversary deluxe edition of The Piper at the Gates of Dawn. "Paintbox" in mono was again reissued in 2016 on the Cambridge St/ation and Cre/ation discs in The Early Years 1965–1972 box set.

== Music video ==
A promotional film for this song was shot for Belgian television on 18 or 19 February 1968, in which the band mimes to the song on a bridge in Brussels. Although Syd Barrett was still a member of the band when the song was recorded (October 1967) and at the time of the film shooting, the film shows David Gilmour on guitar, in his first appearance on film with Pink Floyd. The Atomium monument can be seen in the background as the band plays.

== Personnel ==
- Richard Wright – lead vocals, piano, tack piano
- Syd Barrett – acoustic and electric guitars, backing vocals
- Roger Waters – bass guitar, backing vocals
- Nick Mason – drums

Additional:

- Norman Smith (Music Producer) - Backing Vocals
