= See Emily Play =

1967 song by Pink Floyd

- Artwork by Syd Barrett for 1967 UK promotional release (Note: the artwork for 1967 UK promotional release, by Syd Barrett, was used commercially for a few other European territories. Both the 1967 German single and the 2013 UK reissue use the same artwork, with different drawing colour. The UK retail single used a generic company sleeve.)

Single by Pink Floyd

from the album The Piper at the Gates of Dawn (US release)
- B-side: "The Scarecrow"
- Released: 16 June 1967
- Recorded: 21 May 1967
- Studio: Sound Techniques, London
- Genre: Psychedelic pop; psychedelic rock; psychedelia
- Length: 2:55 (single version); 2:47 (Echoes: The Best of Pink Floyd version)
- Label: EMI Columbia (UK); Tower (US)
- Songwriter: Syd Barrett
- Producer: Norman Smith

Pink Floyd singles chronology
"Arnold Layne" (1967)	"See Emily Play" (1967)	"Flaming" (1967)

Music video
- "See Emily Play" on YouTube

Audio sample
- file; help

"See Emily Play" is a song by the English rock band Pink Floyd, released as their second single on 16 June 1967 on the Columbia label. Written by original frontman Syd Barrett, it was released as a non-album single but appeared as the opening track of Pink Floyd, the US edition of the band's debut album The Piper at the Gates of Dawn (1967).

The song was written by Barrett following the Games for May concert and became a top 10 hit when released in the UK the following month. The group appeared three times on Top of the Pops, where Barrett started showing signs of erratic behaviour, which ultimately led to him leaving the group in early 1968. Although Pink Floyd seldom performed the song live, it has been recorded subsequently by at least seven diverse artists and regarded as a classic psychedelic pop single.

== Writing ==
"See Emily Play" is also known as "Games for May", named after a free concert on 12 May 1967 at the Queen Elizabeth Hall on London's South Bank, in which Pink Floyd performed. It was the first show where the group set up a quadraphonic PA system, which would be a regular feature of future gigs.

The song was reportedly about a girl named Emily, whom Barrett claimed to have seen while sleeping in the woods after taking a psychedelic drug. According to A Saucerful of Secrets: The Pink Floyd Odyssey, by Nicholas Schaffner, Emily is the Honourable Emily Young, daughter of Wayland Young, 2nd Baron Kennet, and nicknamed "the psychedelic schoolgirl" at the UFO Club. Barrett's then-girlfriend, Libby Gausden, disputes this theory – she said that she and Syd had discussed marriage, and that "Emily" was going to be the name of their first child. Bassist Roger Waters later said the woods mentioned in the song were based next to the Gog Magog Hills near Cambridge.

It has been suggested by some that the slide guitar effect was produced by Barrett using a Zippo lighter, but elsewhere that he used a plastic ruler.

The train depicted on the single's sleeve was drawn by Barrett.

== Recording ==
Producer Norman Smith attempted to duplicate the sound of their first single, "Arnold Layne", which was produced by Joe Boyd, by returning to Sound Techniques studios in London on 18 May 1967 because he was not able to get the same sound at the more advanced Abbey Road Studios.

The exact recording details are unclear because of a lack of paperwork in the EMI archive. Engineer Jeff Jarrett recalls that it was recorded in a much longer form, which was then edited down for the single release. The recording involved backward tapes and much use of echo and reverb; the first piano bridge between the first chorus and second verse was recorded at a slow pace then sped up for the final master. The four-track master tape was wiped or misplaced. It no longer exists and has never been mixed into true stereo, but some have created stereo remixes which are available to stream on YouTube. It was reprocessed for Duophonic stereo on the 1971 Relics compilation album.

Barrett, reputedly, was not happy with the final studio cut, and protested against its release, which Norman Smith speculated was based on his fear of commercialism. During sessions for the song David Gilmour visited the studio, on Barrett's invitation, and was shocked by the perceived changes in Barrett's personality when he did not appear to recognise him. For many years Gilmour would recall this, saying, "I'll go on record as saying, that was when he changed".

== Release ==
The UK single was released by Columbia Records on 16 June 1967, with "The Scarecrow" as the B-side. It reached number 6 in the charts. Gary Brooker, reviewing the single for Melody Maker, said he recognised the single as Pink Floyd's "by the horrible organ sound" but said it was "much better than Arnold Layne".

The US single was released by Tower Records on 24 July 1967, both as a standard issue and a white label promotional pressing. Cash Box said that it's "one of those hard to predict outings that could hit in a grand manner or fall flat." It reached number 134 in the charts. A further white label promo was issued on 22 July 1968 with a note asking if DJs would play it.

"See Emily Play" later appeared on a number of compilations: Relics (1971), Works (1983), Shine On (1992), Echoes: The Best of Pink Floyd (2001), The Piper at the Gates of Dawn 40th Anniversary Edition (2007), The Best of Pink Floyd: A Foot in the Door (2011) and The Early Years 1965–1972 (2016). The song was also included on the Barrett retrospective An Introduction to Syd Barrett (2010).

== Television performances ==
Pink Floyd performed the song three times on BBC TV's Top of the Pops. The appearances were taped at the BBC Studios in Shepherd's Bush and broadcast on 6, 13 and 27 July. For the final appearance, Barrett complained that the band shouldn't appear, because "John Lennon doesn't have to do Top of the Pops". He did perform, but without the enthusiasm of the previous week. This was the first sign of Barrett exhibiting erratic behaviour, which caused problems for the group throughout the remainder of the year, and ultimately led to him leaving the band in early 1968.

The BBC wiped the shows. In late 2009, a badly damaged home video recording was recovered by the British Film Institute containing the first and third show the song was performed on, although only the first appearance was recoverable in part. Parts of the 6 July performance have been recovered from the damaged video recording. It was given a public screening in London on 9 January 2010 at an event called "Missing Believed Wiped" devoted to recovered television shows. It was the first time any footage of the performance had been seen since its original broadcast. The Pink Floyd management used a copy of the footage in The Early Years 1965–1972.

The band were booked to appear on the German television programme Beat-Club. The appearance was cancelled, explaining Barrett had suffered "nervous exhaustion" and the band decided to take a month-long break in the hope his health would recover.

In February 1968, Pink Floyd travelled to the RTB studios in Brussels to film a television special for the television programme Tienerklanken, broadcast on 31 March. The special featured promotional films for "See Emily Play", as well as for "Astronomy Domine", "The Scarecrow", "Apples and Oranges", "Paint Box", "Set the Controls for the Heart of the Sun", and "Corporal Clegg". This was Gilmour's first television work with the band. The footage for "See Emily Play" was shot in the Parc de Laeken. Although Barrett was no longer performing with Pink Floyd, his departure had yet to be formally announced. Gilmour, Waters and Richard Wright mimed to Barrett's vocals.

== Live performances ==
"See Emily Play" was very different from the usual content of Pink Floyd's live show, which was based around lengthy instrumentals, and the group avoided playing it. Promoters outside London insisted that they include the song in their live shows to avoid rioting. As a response, the group wrote a piece called "Reaction in G" as a reaction against having to play "See Emily Play" on tour.

The song stayed in the band's set list for only a few months; the last documented live performance was on 25 November 1967 in Blackpool as part of a package tour supporting Jimi Hendrix. On the group's late 1971 US tour supporting Meddle, a fan cried out for "See Emily Play", to which Waters retorted, "You must be joking!"

== Legacy ==
Part of the vocal melody was played on a Minimoog by Rick Wright at the very end of "Shine On You Crazy Diamond (Parts VI–IX)" at the end of 1975's Wish You Were Here, as a tribute to Barrett.

The final couplet from 1994's "High Hopes" ("The endless river/Forever and ever") recalls a line from "See Emily Play," ("Float on a river/Forever and ever"), and inspired the name of the band's final studio album, The Endless River, released in 2014.

The song was played live by Nick Mason's Saucerful of Secrets. A recording is included on their 2020 live album Live at the Roundhouse.

"See Emily Play" has been covered by David Bowie, for his Pin Ups album in 1973; Japanese new wave/rock group Salon Music, for their 1984 album La Paloma Show; The Grapes of Wrath, as a B-side on the 1991 CD single "I Am Here"; Arjen Lucassen, on his 1997 album Strange Hobby; Judy Dyble, for her album Spindle; Martha Wainwright, on her 2008 album I Know You're Married But I've Got Feelings Too; and by 3, on the 2008 re-release of their album The End Is Begun. John Frusciante has played it live. All About Eve played the song live at the Marquee Club on 18 September 1992 and recorded a demo, which was not released until 2006 as part of the Keepsakes compilation.

"See Emily Play" is included in the Rock and Roll Hall of Fame's "500 Songs that Shaped Rock and Roll" list.

== EP ==
An EP including the song was released in Spain in 1967, on the La Voz De Su Amo label. All tracks were written by Syd Barrett.

No.	Title	Length
1.	"See Emily Play"	2:48
2.	"Scarecrow"	2:05
3.	"Arnold Layne"	2:50
4.	"Candy and a Currant Bun"	2:40
Total length:		10:23

== Personnel ==
Musicians

- Syd Barrett – lead vocals, electric guitar, slide guitar
- Richard Wright – Farfisa organ, piano, tack piano, Baldwin electric harpsichord, backing vocals
- Roger Waters – bass guitar, backing vocals
- Nick Mason – drums

Technical

- Norman Smith – producer

== Bibliography ==
- Blake, Mark (2011) [2007]. Pigs Might Fly : The Inside Story of Pink Floyd. Arum Press. ISBN 978-1-781-31519-4. Archived from the original on 21 May 2021.
- Manning, Toby (2006). The Rough Guide to Pink Floyd (1st ed.). London: Rough Guides. ISBN 1-84353-575-0.
- Povey, Glenn (2007). Echoes : The Complete History of Pink Floyd (New ed.). Mind Head Publishing. ISBN 978-0-9554624-0-5.
