= Point Me at the Sky =

Song by Pink Floyd

- 1968 Dutch single

Single by Pink Floyd
- B-side: "Careful with That Axe, Eugene"
- Released: 6 December 1968
- Recorded: 4 November 1968
- Genre: Psychedelic pop
- Length: 3:35
- Label: Columbia (EMI) (UK); Capitol Records (Canada)
- Songwriters: David Gilmour; Roger Waters
- Producer: Norman Smith

Pink Floyd singles chronology
| "Let There Be More Light" (1968) | "Point Me at the Sky" (1968) | "The Nile Song" (1969) |

"Point Me at the Sky" is the fifth UK single by the English band Pink Floyd, released on 6 December 1968. It was their last single in the UK for over a decade. The song was an early collaboration by bassist Roger Waters and guitarist David Gilmour. The single was not released in the US, but was in Canada, Japan, and some European countries.

The vocals on the verse of the song are sung by Gilmour, and the bridge vocals are shared between Gilmour and Waters.

Promotional UK copies and some foreign releases mistakenly printed the title "Point Me to the Sky" on the label or sleeve.

== Other releases ==
"Point Me at the Sky" has since become one of the rarest of all officially released Pink Floyd recordings. It was not intended for the album release, resulting in the recording being mixed in mono only.

The single did not chart in the UK. The B-side, "Careful with That Axe, Eugene", became far more popular, as it was included on two Pink Floyd albums and played regularly at concerts through the early 1970s.

"Point Me at the Sky" was left out of the 1971 collection Relics, though it was re-issued on the 1992 CD collection The Early Singles, a bonus disc in the Shine On box set. The song was released in the United States for the first time in 1978 on a now-rare promotional album, "A Harvest Sampler" (catalog number SPRO-8795/6). This album contained an otherwise unavailable re-channeled stereo version which was derived from the mono mix.

The first widespread release of "Point Me at the Sky" occurred in 2016, when the song was included in the box set The Early Years 1965–1972 and its sister release Cre/ation: The Early Years 1967–1972, a 2-CD highlights compilation of the full box set.

A performance of "Point Me at the Sky" recorded and broadcast by the BBC in late 1968 was also included in the Early Years 1965–1972 box set. This version has a prolonged middle solo by Wright.

== Video and photos ==
The group made a promotional film for the song in which they posed in goggles and flight outfits with a vintage aeroplane, registration G-ANKH (a De Havilland DH.82A Tiger Moth). A still picture from this photo session was included in promotional materials given away with the U.K. single and on a picture sleeve version released in The Netherlands. Alternate still shots from the same session appeared in the artwork for the 1973 LP A Nice Pair and the booklet for the 1992 remastered CD of A Saucerful of Secrets. The film also features another vintage aircraft, G-ADBO (an AVRO 504N), plus scenes of trains at Paddington Station, with vintage Western Region Class 47 D1928 (later rebuilt as Class 57: 57 302, named "Virgil Tracy"). Also seen: an unidentified class42/43 Warship class loco, and a diesel multiple unit..

== Personnel ==
- David Gilmour – electric guitars, electric slide guitar, backing vocals, lead vocals (verses, second half of choruses)
- Roger Waters – bass guitar, backing vocals, lead vocals (first half of chorus and final verse)
- Rick Wright – Hammond organ, Farfisa organ, piano, glockenspiel, backing vocals
- Nick Mason – drums, maracas, temple blocks

== Legacy ==
Roger Waters has called "Point Me at the Sky" a "notable failure" of the post-Barrett era. Following its lack of chart success, the band decided to stop releasing singles in the UK altogether and concentrate only on albums, since, according to Waters, "we were no bloody good at it."

The song was played live by Nick Mason's Saucerful of Secrets from 2018. A recording is included on their 2020 live album Live at the Roundhouse.

== Charts ==
In a few countries, "Point Me at the Sky" was re-released in subsequent years as Pink Floyd emerged as a popular album band. This occurred in France, Japan and Italy, where it spent three weeks in 1973 on the official Italian Musica e Dischi singles chart, reaching number 20.
