= Apples and Oranges (song) =

- Sleeve for UK promotional release; the UK retail single used a generic company sleeve

Single by Pink Floyd
- B-side: "Paint Box"
- Released: 17 November 1967
- Recorded: 26 and 27 October 1967
- Genre: Psychedelic pop
- Length: 3:08
- Label: Columbia (EMI)
- Songwriter: Syd Barrett
- Producer: Norman Smith

Pink Floyd singles chronology
"Flaming" (1967)	"Apples and Oranges" (1967)	"It Would Be So Nice" (1968)

"Apples and Oranges" is the third UK single by Pink Floyd, the final one written by Syd Barrett, and released in 1967. The B-side was "Paint Box" written by Richard Wright. The song is about a girl whom the narrator meets at the supermarket.

The song was recorded shortly before the band's US tour, on 26 and 27 October.

== TV performances ==
Pink Floyd, along with Barrett, mimed the song on their first US televised performances on The Pat Boone Show and American Bandstand. Barrett kept his lips closed during the first performance but mimed competently on the latter show, of which footage survives. After Barrett was replaced by David Gilmour, the band recorded a promotional film in Belgium in a fruit market with Roger Waters lip synching, as Barrett had left the band by this point.

== Release ==
It was the group's first single that failed to break into the UK charts, and their US label Tower Records issued a US-only single instead: "Flaming" b/w "The Gnome" (Tower 378). Waters blamed the single's sales performance on Norman Smith: "'Apples and Oranges' was destroyed by the production. It's a fucking good song". When the single failed to reach the charts, Barrett's reply was that he "couldn't care less".

== Further release ==
Both sides of the single were mixed in stereo, but the single was issued in mono, which was very muddy and probably contributed to its lack of success. The stereo mix of "Paint Box" first appeared on the Relics compilation (1971), and both tracks appeared in stereo on the Masters of Rock compilation (1974). The other four early UK singles were issued in mono originally. "Arnold Layne", "See Emily Play", "It Would Be So Nice", and "Point Me at the Sky" only exist in mono or false stereo, while "Julia Dream" was remixed for stereo at a later time, for inclusion on Relics. Mono and stereo mixes of "Apples and Oranges" and the mono mix of "Paint Box" are included in the 40th Anniversary Deluxe Edition release of The Piper at the Gates of Dawn.

== Reception ==
"It's a happy song, and it's got a touch of Christmas. It's about a girl who I saw just walking round town, in Richmond." — Syd Barrett

NME hailed it as "the most psychedelic single the Pink Floyd have come up with", however, it was "pretty hard to get a hold of".

== Personnel ==
- Syd Barrett – electric guitar, lead vocals
- Richard Wright – Hammond organ, piano, electric piano, backing vocals, falsetto lead vocals (bridge)
- Roger Waters – bass guitar, backing vocals
- Nick Mason – drums, tambourine

== Bibliography ==
- Chapman, Rob (2010). Syd Barrett: A Very Irregular Head (1st ed.). London: Faber and Faber. ISBN 978-0-571-23854-5.
- MacDonald, Bruno (1997). Pink Floyd: Through the Eyes of the Band, Its Fans, Friends, and Foes. ISBN 978-0-306-80780-0.
- Manning, Toby (2006). The Rough Guide to Pink Floyd (1st ed.). London: Rough Guides. ISBN 1-84353-575-0.
- Palacios, Julian (2010). Syd Barrett & Pink Floyd: Dark Globe (Rev. ed.). London: Plexus. ISBN 978-0859654319.
- Povey, Glenn (2007). Echoes : The Complete History of Pink Floyd (New ed.). Mind Head Publishing. ISBN 978-0-9554624-0-5.
- Schaffner, Nicholas (2005). Saucerful of Secrets: The Pink Floyd Odyssey (New ed.). London: Helter Skelter. ISBN 1-905139-09-8.
- Strong, Martin C. (2004). The Great Rock Discography (7th ed.). Edinburgh: Canongate Books. ISBN 1-84195-551-5.
