= Relics (album) =

- Original 1971 cover

Compilation album by Pink Floyd
- Released: 14 May 1971 (UK)
- Recorded: 1967–1969
- Genres: Psychedelic rock; progressive rock; space rock; experimental rock; avant-garde
- Length: 49:38
- Label: Starline
- Producers: Pink Floyd; Norman Smith; Joe Boyd

Pink Floyd chronology
The Best of the Pink Floyd (1970)	Relics (1971)	Meddle (1971)

Compact Disc cover
- 1996 reissue artwork

Pink Floyd compilation albums chronology
The Best of the Pink Floyd (1970)	Relics (1971)	A Nice Pair (1973)

Professional ratings
Review scores
Source	Rating
AllMusic	4.5/5 stars
BBC	Positive
Blender	4/5 stars
The Encyclopedia of Popular Music	4/5 stars
Yahoo! Music	favourable

Relics (subtitle: A Bizarre Collection of Antiques & Curios) is a 1971 compilation album by English rock band Pink Floyd. A remastered CD was released in 1996 with an updated album cover.

== Background ==
Relics was assembled by EMI to bridge the commercial gap between Pink Floyd's previous album, Atom Heart Mother, and the upcoming album Meddle. Relics was released on the budget Starline label and combined early singles, B-sides, and album tracks, in addition to a previously unreleased 1969 studio recording of "Biding My Time", originally a live-only piece entitled "Afternoon", included in the Man and the Journey concert sequence.

== Artwork ==
The album cover features a drawing of an elaborate fictional contraption by drummer and former architecture student Nick Mason. In 2008, he sold a limited edition of 195 signed prints of the cover. When the album was released on CD in 1996, designer Storm Thorgerson, inspired by the cover of The Division Bell, commissioned a real-life version of Mason's contraption, which was photographed as the new artwork.

== Track listing ==
Side one
No.	Title	Writer(s)	Lead vocals	Length
1.	"Arnold Layne" (Single A-side released 11 March 1967)	Barrett	Barrett	2:56
2.	"Interstellar Overdrive" (from The Piper at the Gates of Dawn 1967)	Barrett, Waters, Wright, Mason	instrumental	9:43
3.	"See Emily Play" (Single A-side released 17 June 1967)	Barrett	Barrett	2:53
4.	"Remember a Day" (from A Saucerful of Secrets 1968)	Wright	Wright	4:29
5.	"Paint Box" (Single B-side to "Apples and Oranges", released 18 November 1967)	Wright	Wright	3:33
Total length:				23:34

Side two
No.	Title	Writer(s)	Lead vocals	Length
6.	"Julia Dream" (Single B-side to "It Would Be So Nice", released 13 April 1968)	Waters	Gilmour	2:37
7.	"Careful with That Axe, Eugene" (Single B-side to "Point Me at the Sky", released 7 December 1968)	Gilmour, Waters, Wright, Mason	instrumental, vocalizations by Waters and Gilmour	5:45
8.	"Cirrus Minor" (from Soundtrack from the Film More 1969)	Waters	Gilmour	5:18
9.	"The Nile Song" (from Soundtrack from the Film More 1969)	Waters	Gilmour	3:25
10.	"Biding My Time" (Previously unreleased, 1969)	Waters	Waters	5:18
11.	"Bike" (from The Piper at the Gates of Dawn 1967)	Barrett	Barrett	3:21
Total length:				25:44

== Personnel ==
Pink Floyd

- Syd Barrett – lead and rhythm guitar (1–5, 11), lead vocals (1, 3, 11), backing vocals
- David Gilmour – lead and rhythm guitar (6–10), lead vocals (6, 8, 9), vocalizations (7), backing vocals
- Nick Mason – drums (1–3, 5–7, 9–11), percussion, original cover design
- Roger Waters – bass guitar (all tracks), lead vocals (10), vocalizations (7), backing vocals
- Rick Wright – Farfisa organ (1–4, 8), Hammond organ (6–8, 10), piano (3–5, 10, 11), lead vocals (4, 5), backing vocals; tack piano (3, 5, 11), electric harpsichord (3), Mellotron (6), vibraphone (7), trombone (10), harmonium (11), celesta (11), violin (11)

Additional personnel

- James Guthrie – remastering supervision
- Norman Smith – drums and backing vocals (4), drum roll (2)
- Doug Sax – remastering

== Charts and certifications ==
=== Charts ===
Chart performance for Relics
Chart (1971)	Peak position
Australian Albums (Kent Music Report)	29
Canada Top Albums/CDs (RPM)	65
UK Albums (Official Charts)	32
US Billboard 200	152
Chart (2018)	Peak position
Austrian Albums (Ö3 Austria)	72
German Albums (Offizielle Top 100)	43
Italian Albums (FIMI)	41
Scottish Albums (Official Charts)	56
UK Rock & Metal Albums (Official Charts)	6

=== Certifications ===
Certifications for Relics
Region	Certification	Certified units/sales
United Kingdom (BPI)	Gold	100,000^{*}
^{*} Sales figures based on certification alone.
