= It Would Be So Nice =

Single by Pink Floyd
- B-side: "Julia Dream"
- Released: 19 April 1968
- Recorded: February 1968
- Studio: Abbey Road Studios, London, UK
- Genre: Psychedelic pop; bubblegum pop
- Length: 3:47
- Label: Columbia (EMI) (UK)
- Songwriter: Richard Wright
- Producer: Norman Smith

Pink Floyd singles chronology
"Apples and Oranges" (1967)	"It Would Be So Nice" (1968)	"Let There Be More Light" (1968)

"It Would Be So Nice" is a song by the English rock band Pink Floyd, written by the keyboard player/singer Richard Wright. It was the fourth single released by the group and the first to feature new guitarist David Gilmour, following the departure of founding member Syd Barrett.

The song was left out of the 1971 collection Relics which collected other rare tracks from Pink Floyd singles. Its B-side, "Julia Dream", was written by the bass guitarist Roger Waters (who was gradually transitioning into his eventual role as the predominant songwriter and vocalist) and was also re-released on The Early Singles.

== Alleged alternate version ==
According to a newspaper story published in April 1968, there are two versions of the original single with slightly different lyrics. The story goes that the first lyric had a passing reference to the London evening newspaper, the Evening Standard. This was said to be banned by the BBC because of a strict no-advertising policy which did not allow the mention of any product by name. The article, published in the Evening Standard, claimed that the group were forced to spend an additional £750 to record a special version for the BBC which changed the lyric to "Daily Standard". This version is the only one that has been reissued on LP and CD. It is unknown how many of the "Evening Standard" discs, if any, actually exist. Despite the added publicity, the single received very little airplay and failed to enter the UK Singles Chart.

== Reception ==
In The Dark Side of the Moon: The Making of the Pink Floyd Masterpiece, John Harris writes about the song:

"The first recorded work [Pink Floyd] released in the wake of Syd Barrett's exit was Richard Wright's almost unbearably whimsical 'It Would Be So Nice,' a single whose lightweight strain of pop-psychedelia—akin, perhaps, to the music of such faux-counterculturalists as the Hollies and the Monkees—rendered it a non-event that failed to trouble the British charts; as Roger Waters later recalled, 'No one ever heard it because it was such a lousy record.' Waters' own compositional efforts, however, were hardly more promising. 'Julia Dream', the single's B-side, crystallized much the same problem: though the band evidently wanted to maintain the Syd Barrett aesthetic, their attempts sounded hopelessly lightweight."

Nick Mason was even more vocal than Waters in his dislike for the song:

Mason: "Fucking awful, that record, wasn't it? At that period we had no direction. We were being hustled about to make hit singles. There's so many people saying it's important you start to think it is important. It is possible on an LP to do exactly what we want to do. . . ."

Roger Waters: "Live bookings seem to depend on whether or not you have a record in the Top Ten. I don't like 'It Would Be So Nice.' I don't like the song or the way it's sung."

Mason: "We were a rock and roll band and if you're a rock and roll band and you've got a record that you want to be number one, you get it played and if they say 'take something out' or whatever - you do it. In fact what you do is exactly what was done - you make as much press out of it as possible. You ring up the Evening Standard and say: 'Did you know that the BBC won't play our record because it mentions your paper?'"

== Personnel ==
- Richard Wright – double-tracked lead vocals, Farfisa organ, tack piano, Mellotron, recorder
- David Gilmour – electric guitar, acoustic guitar, backing vocals
- Roger Waters – bass guitar
- Nick Mason – drums

== Other versions ==
Captain Sensible recorded the song for his second solo album, The Power of Love.
