= Candy and a Currant Bun =

1967 single by Pink Floyd

- Side B of UK single; solid centre variant

Single by Pink Floyd
- A-side: "Arnold Layne"
- Released: 10 March 1967
- Recorded: 29 January 1967 at Sound Techniques Studios (London, United Kingdom); 27 February 1967 at EMI Studios (London, United Kingdom)
- Genre: Psychedelic pop
- Length: 2:38
- Label: Columbia (EMI) (UK); Tower/Capitol (US)
- Songwriter: Syd Barrett
- Producer: Joe Boyd

"Candy and a Currant Bun" is the B-side to Pink Floyd's first single, "Arnold Layne". Its lyrical content is about drugs and casual sex. The song was written and sung by singer and guitarist Syd Barrett.

== Lyric change ==
When performed live in 1967, the song was known as "Let's Roll Another One" and contained the line "I'm high – Don't try to spoil my fun", but the record company forced Syd Barrett to rewrite it, at the suggestion of Roger Waters, without the controversial drug references.

== Critical reception ==
When the collection Relics was released in 1971, critic Dave Marsh wrote in Creem that he had expected "Candy and a Currant Bun" to be on it (it was not). His album review was largely composed of a paean to this missing track, writing in part that "It's simply the definitive 1967 British rock'n'roll single. It's also uniquely powerful, like one of those first two or three Who 45s, the kind that send chills runnin' up and down your spine, and make you listen time and time again. Unlike the Pink Floyd's later work, 'Candy And A Currant Bun' never ditches rock'n'roll for space music, but it does manage to give something of the sense of multi-galactic perspective that the best of Pink Floyd's (read Syd Barrett's) music has had."

== The Mars Volta cover ==
"Candy and a Currant Bun"

Promotional single by The Mars Volta

from the album The Bedlam in Goliath
- Released: 28 January 2008
- Length: 2:20
- Label: Warner Bros./Amnesty International
- Songwriter: Syd Barrett
- Producer: Omar Rodríguez-López

The Mars Volta's cover of "Candy and a Currant Bun" was released in some U.S. indie stores as a free 5" VinylDisc in 2008. It was given away with purchase of the album The Bedlam in Goliath. The VinylDisc was an experimental format that contained a digital side and a vinyl side, one side playing in a CD player, while the other side playing on a turntable. The vinyl side contains the Pink Floyd cover "Candy and a Currant Bun", while the CD side contains the audio track for "Candy and a Currant Bun" as well as the "Wax Simulacra" video as enhanced content. It also comes with a removable foam spindle insert to switch between CD and vinyl.

The track was a bonus track on the UK and Australasian releases of the album.

== Personnel ==
- Syd Barrett – lead vocals, electric guitars
- Rick Wright – Farfisa organ, harmony vocals
- Roger Waters – bass, screaming
- Nick Mason – drums, backing vocals (spoken "drive me wild" line)
