= Arnold Layne =

1967 single by Pink Floyd

- Sleeve for UK promotional release; the UK retail single used a generic company sleeve

Single by Pink Floyd
- B-side: "Candy and a Currant Bun"
- Released: 10 March 1967
- Recorded: 29 January – 27 February 1967
- Studio: Sound Techniques and EMI Studios, London
- Genre: Psychedelic rock; psychedelic pop; psychedelia
- Length: 2:57
- Label: EMI Columbia
- Songwriter: Syd Barrett
- Producer: Joe Boyd

Pink Floyd singles chronology
"Arnold Layne" (1967)	"See Emily Play" (1967)

Music video
- "Arnold Layne" on YouTube

"Arnold Layne" is a song by English rock band Pink Floyd. Released on 10 March 1967, it was the band's first single and was written by Syd Barrett. The B-side was "Candy and a Currant Bun" also written by Barrett.

== Lyrics ==
The song is about a man whose strange hobby is stealing women's lingerie from washing lines. According to Roger Waters, "Arnold Layne" was actually based on a real person: "Both my mother and Syd's mother had students as lodgers because there was a girls' college up the road so there were constantly great lines of bras and knickers on our washing lines and 'Arnold' or whoever he was, had bits off our washing lines."

== Recording and production ==
In January Pink Floyd went to Sound Techniques studio in Chelsea, where they had previously recorded two songs for Tonite Let's All Make Love in London. Here, the band recorded "Arnold Layne" and a few other songs: "Matilda Mother", "Chapter 24" and "Let's Roll Another One" (which was renamed to "Candy and a Currant Bun", at the lead of Waters).

Nick Mason said of why "Arnold Layne" was chosen over the other songs: "We knew we wanted to be rock'n'roll stars and we wanted to make singles, so it seemed the most suitable song to condense into 3 minutes without losing too much". The band had tried to re-record "Arnold Layne" after signing up with EMI, but the Joe Boyd version from January was released instead. The song would be Boyd's last production for the band.

Boyd mentioned in several interviews over the years that "Arnold Layne" regularly ran for ten to fifteen minutes in concert (with extended instrumental passages), but the band knew that it had to be shortened for use as a single. He has also said it was a complex recording involving some tricky editing, recalling that the middle instrumental section with Richard Wright's organ solo was recorded as an edit piece and spliced into the song for the final mix.

The backing track for "Arnold Layne" was recorded in multiple takes on 4-track tape, the third take being the best. Drums and bass were recorded on track one, electric guitar on track two, keyboard on track three, and acoustic guitar on track four. It was then bounced onto one track on another 4-track reel so vocals could be overdubbed. This was done across multiple takes where take seven became the master.

Both "Arnold Layne" and "Candy and a Currant Bun" were mixed into mono for the single. Neither have ever been given a stereo mix, although the four-track master tapes still exist in the EMI tape archive.

== Music videos ==
A black and white promotional film of "Arnold Layne" was made in late February 1967, directed by Derek Nice and featuring members of the band dressing up, dismembering and carrying around a mannequin on a beach, filmed at East Wittering, West Sussex. One sequence employs reverse motion. This promo, made for £2,000, was meant to be screened on 3 April 1967 for the BBC's Top of the Pops show, but was cancelled when the single dropped down the chart. Another promotional film was recorded for the song, this time filmed on 29 April 1967, near St Michael's Church in Highgate. The film is the only known footage of Barrett lip-synching to the song.

== Release ==
Side A of UK single; solid centre variant

The single was released on 10 March 1967 in the UK, backed by "Candy and a Currant Bun". The band is credited as "The Pink Floyd" on the single, although the determiner the would be dropped for subsequent releases. The band's management, Blackhill Enterprises, had paid to boost the single's chart position, as manager Andrew King stated: "We spent a couple of hundred quid, [...] trying to buy it into the charts. The management did that, not EMI." However, despite reaching number 20 in the UK singles chart, the song's unusual transvestism theme attracted the ire of pirate radio station Radio London, which deemed the song was too far removed from "normal" society for its listeners, before eventually banning it from radio airplay altogether.

The song later appeared on the budget 1971 compilation album Relics, their 1983 compilation album Works and their 2001 retrospective best-of, Echoes: The Best of Pink Floyd. Both sides of the single appear on the first volume 1965–1967: Cambridge St/ation in the 2016 Early Years box set, and on a replica seven-inch single also included in the set.

== Track listing ==
All tracks written by Syd Barrett, excluding Interstellar Overdrive which was written by Syd Barrett, Roger Waters, Rick Wright and Nick Mason.

=== 1967 single ===
No.	Title	Length
1.	"Arnold Layne"	2:57
2.	"Candy and a Currant Bun"	2:38
Total length:		5:35

=== 1967 French EP ===
No.	Title	Length
1.	"Arnold Layne"	2:54
2.	"Candy and a Currant Bun"	2:45
3.	"Interstellar Overdrive" (edit)	5:00
Total length:		10:39

== Personnel ==
=== Pink Floyd ===
- Syd Barrett – guitar, vocals
- Richard Wright – Farfisa organ, backing vocals
- Roger Waters – bass
- Nick Mason – drums

== David Gilmour version ==
"Arnold Layne"

Single by David Gilmour

from the album Remember That Night
- B-side: "Dark Globe"
- Released: 26 December 2006
- Recorded: 29 May 2006 at Royal Albert Hall, London (track 1); 30 May 2006 at Royal Albert Hall (track 2); 27 July 2006 at Klam Castle, Austria (track 3).
- Length: 3:30 (with David Bowie); 3:23 (with Richard Wright)
- Label: EMI
- Songwriter: Syd Barrett
- Producer: David Gilmour

David Gilmour singles chronology
"Smile" (2006)	"Arnold Layne" (2006)	"Rattle That Lock" (2015)

David Gilmour, during his solo tour promoting On an Island, unexpectedly added the song to the setlist near the end of the American tour on 17 April 2006 at the Oakland Paramount Theatre. This version of the song was sung by Richard Wright and remained in the setlist until 31 May.

On 26 December 2006, two live recordings of the song, from Gilmour's On an Island shows at the Royal Albert Hall were released as a live single, which peaked at No. 19 on the UK singles chart. One version had guest vocals by David Bowie. Both versions are featured on Gilmour's DVD/BD, Remember That Night (Bowie's version on disc one and Wright's version as a bonus on disc two).

=== Track listing ===
All tracks written by Syd Barrett.

1. "Arnold Layne" (with David Bowie) – 3:30
2. "Arnold Layne" (with Richard Wright) – 3:23
3. "Dark Globe" – 2:23

=== Personnel ===
- David Gilmour – Fender Telecaster electric guitar, backing vocals (tracks 1–2), acoustic guitar, lead vocals (track 3)
- David Bowie - lead vocals (track 1)
- Richard Wright – organ (tracks 1–2), lead vocals (track 2), backing vocals (track 1)
- Jon Carin – keyboards, backing vocals (tracks 1–2)
- Phil Manzanera – guitar, backing vocals (tracks 1–2)
- Steve DiStanislao – drums (tracks 1–2)
- Guy Pratt – bass guitar, backing vocals (tracks 1–2)

== Pink Floyd 2007 performance ==
On 10 May 2007, Pink Floyd, featuring Gilmour (guitar and backing vocals), Mason (drums) and Wright (lead vocals and keyboards), augmented by Jon Carin (keyboards, vocals) and Andy Bell from Ride/Oasis (bass guitar) performed for what was the band's final live performance, at The Barbican, London, for The Madcap's Last Laugh, a tribute show for Syd Barrett organised by Nick Laird-Clowes and Joe Boyd. At the end of the show, they were introduced as surprise guests and Wright sang his band's first single one final time. This also saw the final performance by Pink Floyd with Wright, who died in September 2008.

=== Personnel ===
- David Gilmour – Guitar, vocals
- Richard Wright – keyboards, vocals
- Nick Mason – Drums
- Andy Bell – Bass
- Jon Carin – Keyboards, Vocals
- Damon Iddins – Mixer
- Ray Staff - Mastering
- Damon Iddins – Mastering
- Aubrey Powell - Creative Director
- Peter Curzon - Design
- Rupert Truman - Photography

== Other versions ==
- Robyn Hitchcock covered the song on his 2020 album The Man Downstairs: Demos & Rarities.
- Arjen Lucassen covered this song on his 1996 cover album Strange Hobby. The album's title is taken from this song.
- The Boomtown Rats also recorded a cover.
- The Damned have also recorded several versions, but none have been commercially released.
- Nick Mason's Saucerful of Secrets recorded a live rendition, released in 2020 on their album Live at the Roundhouse.
- Étienne Daho released a cover version on his EP Tombé Pour La France in 1985.
