= List of unreleased songs recorded by Pink Floyd =

Pink Floyd have been known to perform and/or record a number of songs and instrumentals which have never been officially released on a single or album. Only those whose existence can be reliably confirmed are listed here. Bootleg recordings of the majority of below-listed songs exist.

Several previously unreleased songs appeared on The Early Years 1965–1972 box set in November 2016, and The Later Years box set in December 2019, which marked their first official releases.

== Syd Barrett–era unreleased songs ==
=== "I Get Stoned" ===
"I Get Stoned" is a Barrett song recorded live-in-studio on 31 October 1966, along with a version of "Interstellar Overdrive", at Thompson Private Recording Company. The song features Barrett with an acoustic guitar. The song was performed during a gig at the All Saints Hall in 1966. The opening lines are thought to be "Living alone/I get stoned". The master tapes for the song are unknown; however, a demo was recorded by Barrett under the title "Living Alone" during the sessions for the Barrett album on 27 February 1970.

=== "Pink Theme" ===
"Pink Theme" is a song performed by the Barrett-era Pink Floyd in 1966. The song is thought to be an instrumental. Pink Floyd recorded the song at a concert at The All Saints Church Hall in London, England, on 14 October 1966. No known recording of this song is extant.

=== "Flapdoodle Dealing" ===
"Flapdoodle Dealing" is an instrumental song performed by the Barrett-era Pink Floyd in 1966. Roger Waters is thought to have come up with its title. Pink Floyd never recorded a studio version of the song; however, a version was recorded live at a concert at The All Saints Church Hall in London, England, on 14 October 1966.

=== "Let's Roll Another One" ===
"Let's Roll Another One" is a Barrett song, later retitled "Candy and a Currant Bun" before being released in 1967. It was written in 1965. It features the original lyrics which were altered for the released single at the suggestion of Waters, allegedly due to concerns about the acceptability of drug references, and the song can be found on bootlegs like "Feed Your Head".

=== "She Was a Millionaire" ===
"She Was a Millionaire" is a Barrett song, recorded at Abbey Road on 18 April 1967 as a possible B-side. Manager Peter Jenner said that the track was "the one that got away, the hit they were looking for." The opening lines are thought to be "She was a millionaire/She had some time to spare". The instrumental backing track was completed by Pink Floyd but the master tapes for the song were most likely erased. Elements from the song, however, would later become part of Barrett's solo song "Opel" recorded in 1969. Two takes were attempted as a backing track by Barrett during the sessions for the Barrett album in 1970, before Barrett added vocals.

=== "Reaction in G" ===
Instrumental composed as a response to the record label demands for a new single. It was played as a concert opener and is available on bootleg recordings of the concerts in Copenhagen, Denmark, on 13 September 1967 and Rotterdam, Netherlands, on 13 November 1967. A track with that title was released on the Early Years box set. The track in the box set is most likely not "Reaction in G", as the track is in the key of G and not E, as "Reaction in G" is. It also lacks the signature intro that is in the bootleg recordings of "Reaction in G".

A studio version was recorded at Sound Techniques on 15 and 16 August 1967. An excerpt of this recording was used by Beat Club News as background music for the intro, during 1969. It is unknown how they obtained the tape.

=== "Untitled" ===
This was an instrumental recorded at Sound Techniques on 4 September 1967. The first 90 seconds of the song are available on various bootlegs. This track is sometimes incorrectly labelled "Sunshine", a piece which later became a section of "Matilda Mother". One Floyd prosopography claims that this recording is over fifteen minutes in length.

=== "One in a Million" ===
"One in a Million" (also known by the titles "Rush in a Million", "Once in a Million", "Rust in a Million", and "Brush Your Window") is a song performed by the Barrett-era Pink Floyd in 1967. Pink Floyd performed the song at a concert in Copenhagen, Denmark, on 13 September 1967. The discrepancies in the title stem from Roger Waters' misheard stage announcement on the poor-quality audience recording of the show. It was sung by Waters.

=== "Intremental" ===
"Intremental" is a 10-minute instrumental that was recorded at De Lane Lea on 20 October 1967.

=== "Early Morning Henry" ===
A demo from the "Set the Controls for the Heart of the Sun" sessions, as mentioned in David Parker's book Random Precision, a guide to the recordings of Barrett. Parker states that he contacted Mason to enquire as to what this song was, but Mason could not remember. In 2020, an acetate of this recording was found and sold in auction. It was revealed that it was a song written and sung by Billy Butler, and Pink Floyd was used as the backing band. As part of the auction a 47-second snippet of the song was posted online. The full song has still not been released.

=== "Green Onions" ===
A cover of "Green Onions" by Booker T. & the M.G.'s was performed on the BBC1 TV programme Tomorrow's World on 12 December 1967.

=== "Have You Got It Yet?" ===
"Have You Got It Yet?" is an unfinished song written by Barrett during the short time in which Pink Floyd was a five-piece. At the time, David Gilmour had been asked to join as a fifth member and second guitarist, while Barrett, whose mental state was creating issues with the band, was intended to remain home and compose songs, much as Brian Wilson had done for The Beach Boys; however, this idea was soon abandoned.

Barrett's unpredictable behaviour at the time and idiosyncratic sense of humour combined to create a song that, initially, seemed like an ordinary Barrett tune. However, as soon as the others attempted to join in and learn the song, Barrett changed the melodies and structure, making it impossible for the others to follow, while singing the chorus "Have You Got It Yet?" and having the rest of the band answer "No, no!". This would be his last attempt to write material for Pink Floyd before leaving the band. Waters stated in an interview for The Pink Floyd and Syd Barrett Story that, upon realizing Barrett was deliberately making the tune impossible to learn, he put down his bass guitar, left the room, and never attempted to play with Barrett again. Waters had called it "a real act of mad genius". The song was never recorded by Pink Floyd or Barrett, but its title was used for the 2023 documentary Have You Got It Yet? The Story of Syd Barrett and Pink Floyd, directed by Roddy Bogawa and Storm Thorgerson.

== Later–era unreleased songs ==
=== The Committee instrumentals ===
In early 1968, Pink Floyd recorded several instrumental tracks to be used in the soundtrack to the Peter Sykes film The Committee, starring former Manfred Mann singer Paul Jones. Syd Barrett had originally been approached to record music for the film, but his solo attempt was deemed to be unusable. The band, now with Gilmour on guitar, took over and recorded their pieces in a basement studio in London. The two main pieces are actually the same tune played at two different tempos, with the main riff featured on guitar for the first, the keyboard for the second. A third, lengthy instrumental is an embryonic version of "Careful With That Axe, Eugene". The opening instrumental is a short backwards-played tape made up of Tablas, guitar and a high pitch sound effect, which sounds very similar to what was described by the makers as the piece Barrett had attempted, leading fans to believe his initial idea may have been used by the band. Parts 1 and 2 have seen official release in The Early Years 1965—1972 box set.

=== "Richard's Rave Up" ===
"Richard's Rave Up" was a track recorded on 13 February 1968, during sessions for A Saucerful of Secrets. Per Glenn Povey's The Complete Pink Floyd, studio notes show Take 1 as 2:54 in length. (This was not "Song 1", which was recorded in August 1968 in Los Angeles.)

=== "The Boppin' Sound" ===
"The Boppin' Sound" was recorded and mixed down on 13 February 1968, during sessions for A Saucerful of Secrets. Per Glenn Povey's The Complete Pink Floyd, studio notes show Take 1 as 3:00 in length. (This was not "Roger's Boogie", which was recorded in August 1968 in Los Angeles and is 4:35 in length.)

=== "Incarceration of a Flower Child" ===
A Waters-penned song written in 1968, after Barrett left the band, as an attempt to reinvent themselves. The lyrics are about the downfall of Barrett. The song was eventually recorded by Marianne Faithfull on her 1999 album Vagabond Ways. The melody of the opening of the verses provided the chorus of "Your Possible Pasts", from the Pink Floyd album The Final Cut.

=== "Seabirds" ===
A song used in the More film but as yet unreleased. A song titled "Seabirds" was released as part of The Early Years 1965–1972 box set in 2016; however, this is not the song from the film but an alternative version of the instrumental track "Quicksilver".

=== "Stefan's Tit" ===
An outtake from the More sessions. Working title for "Green Is the Colour".

=== "Paris Bar" ===
Another More outtake, found on the same multitrack tape as the above track. Working title for "Ibiza Bar".

=== "Theme (Dramatic Version)" ===
Another More outtake, found on the same multitrack tape as the above tracks. Working title for "Dramatic Theme".

=== "Alan's Blues" ===
"Alan's Blues" is an instrumental blues song first recorded for the film Zabriskie Point in December 1969. This version was released as a bonus track on the 1997 soundtrack reissue under the title "Love Scene 6". It began appearing in live shows in early 1970, initially along with two other Zabriskie instrumentals ("Heart Beat, Pig Meat" and "The Violent Sequence") that were soon dropped. Performed through 1972, often as an encore. Possibly also recorded in 1971. The song appears on various bootleg recordings (usually live, sometimes given the nickname of "Pink Blues").

=== "Rain in the Country" ===
A nearly-7-minute instrumental outtake from the Zabriskie Point sessions, based on "The Narrow Way". It is available on bootleg albums such as Omay Yad. On the bootleg The Complete Zabriskie Point Sessions, Take 1 ends in "Unknown Song" while Take 2 ends in "Crumbling Land".

=== "Oenone" ===
A lengthy instrumental in the Zabriskie Point film, intended for a sex scene. Three takes were recorded (under the working titles "Love Scene No. 1", "No. 2" and "No. 3"), each somewhat different from the others, but all sharing the same eerie organ-and-guitar motif. The term "Oenone" refers to a Greek mythological character, namely the first wife of Paris of Troy. Early bootleg appearances list the song as "Oneone", sometimes thought to be a misspelling of the mythological character, but more likely a phonetic tip of the hat to Zabriskie Point's director Michelangelo Antonioni. Excerpts of "Oenone" were released as part of The Early Years 1965–1972 box set in 2016 under the titles "Love Scene Version 1" and "Love Scene Version 2", though no complete takes have ever been released officially.

=== "Just Another Twelve Bar" ===
Another improvised instrumental recorded during the Atom Heart Mother world tour in 1970. The sole circulating recording cuts in midway, and what is heard is close enough to the finale jam of the song "Biding My Time" that it's possible this song is simply an excerpt of that one.

=== "Pink Blues" ===
Often referred to as simply "Blues"; blues jam played after encores during the Meddle tour, during 1971. In December 2021, a previously unreleased live album, titled "Embryo, San Diego, Live 17 Oct. 1971", was released on Spotify, along with 11 other new live albums recorded between 1970 and 1972. This album concludes with a 5-minute "Blues Jam". Also see "Alan's Blues" (above).

=== "Corrosion in the Pink Room" ===
"Corrosion in the Pink Room" is a song written by Waters, Gilmour, Wright and Mason. It is an instrumental piece that was played at their live shows during the early 1970s. It is a very avant-garde piece, with eerie piano playing by Wright and scatting by Waters, reminiscent of the sounds on "Several Species of Small Furry Animals Gathered Together in a Cave and Grooving with a Pict". Halfway through, the song transitions to a jazzy blues jam, similar to "Funky Dung". It also was known to feature the "whalesong effect", used during live performances of "Embryo" and, later on, "Echoes". Roger Waters often meddled with their manager Steve O'Rourke while performing, indicated by him calling out "Steven" in this song.

=== "The Merry Xmas Song" ===
"The Merry Xmas Song" is a humorous song written for a one-off performance on BBC radio in 1969, during the Zabriskie Point soundtrack sessions, and performed around 1975. It is notable as one of only six Pink Floyd songs to feature Mason on vocals (the others are Barrett's "Scream Thy Last Scream", "Corporal Clegg", "One of These Days", "Signs of Life", and "Learning to Fly").

=== "Richard Are You Ready Yet?" ===
"Richard Are You Ready Yet?" is a humorous self-parody song improvised during an interlude at the Live at Berlin tour.

=== "Long Blues" ===
An improvised blues piece, "Long Blues" was performed live in 1970, at Montreux. Waters announced that since it was "a bit late for mind-expanding, [they]'re going to play some music to calm down to". While similar in sound to "Alan's Blues", some elements from "Funky Dung" and "Mudmen" are definitely present. It appears on the Early Flights, Volume 1 bootleg.

=== "The Dark Side Sequences" ===
During the early performances of The Dark Side of the Moon they named several tracks as sequences. On the Run was titled "The Travel Sequence", "The Great Gig in the Sky" was "The Mortality Sequence", "Us and Them" was "The Violent Sequence" and "Brain Damage" was "The Lunatic Sequence". These early versions were substantially different from the final studio recordings, such as both "The Violent Sequence" and "The Mortality Sequence" originally lacking vocals.

=== "Bitter Love" ===
Written by Waters, the song is about the bad experience Pink Floyd had after agreeing to appear in magazine advertisements for a French soft lemon drink called "Gini" originally from Perrier. Lyrically, the song describes Waters selling his soul in the desert. The song is also known as "How Do You Feel?".

=== "Drift Away Blues" ===
"Drift Away Blues" is a blues improvisation that was played live on 6 July 1977 at the Stade Olympique, Montreal, as an encore, picked in response to an aggressive audience. Waters introduced the song by telling the audience that "since we can't play any more of our songs, here's some music to go home to." Allegedly, Gilmour was upset at this and slipped off the stage rather than play. It appears on the Azimuth Coordinator Part 3 bootleg, and others of that date.

=== "Overture" ===
"Overture" is a song that was written by Waters for The Wall movie. Pink Floyd decided not to include the song and it is unknown if it was ever recorded.

=== "Death Disco" ===
An unreleased portion of The Wall, in which a DJ is heard to taunt an audience. Some Floyd books mistakenly give the title as "The Death of Disco" or "The Death of Cisco". It introduced the fascist ideas later heard in "In the Flesh", and the guitar riff was later developed into "Young Lust".

== Unreleased albums ==
=== The Committee soundtrack ===
At one point, it was considered that a soundtrack LP should be released containing music heard in the obscure science fiction film The Committee, for which Pink Floyd recorded a handful of seemingly untitled instrumentals (and to which The Crazy World of Arthur Brown contributed the song "Nightmare"). Although bootleg soundtracks (both vinyl and CD) have been released by fans, the fact that the total running time of the material merely fills one side of an LP shows that this may not have been a commercially viable idea.

=== The Man & The Journey live album ===
The conceptual tour following Ummagumma's release was recorded at Amsterdam around autumn and released as a bootleg. This was released on The Early Years 1965—1972 box set in 2016.

=== Zabriskie Point soundtrack ===
In 2011, a document was found regarding a scrapped Zabriskie Point soundtrack LP consisting entirely of Pink Floyd's score (much of which was rejected from the final film). The soundtrack was in fact released, but the album would have originally consisted of the following songs, possibly in this order:

1. "Heart Beat, Pig Meat"
2. "Country Song"
3. "Fingal's Cave"
4. "Crumbling Land"
5. "Alan's Blues"
6. "Oenone"
7. "Rain in the Country/Unknown Song"
8. "Come in No. 51, Your Time Is Up" (this is a different title for "Careful with That Axe, Eugene")

Sixteen additional tracks were released on The Early Years 1965—1972 box set.

=== Household Objects ===
Following the success of The Dark Side of the Moon, Pink Floyd were unsure of their direction and worried about how to top that record's popularity. Returning to their experimental beginnings, they continued a project entitled Household Objects, which would consist of songs played on hand mixers, rubber bands stretched between two tables, wine glasses and so on. They had previously worked on this idea before recording Meddle. The planned album was soon shelved.

"There weren't going to be any real musical instruments on it at all," explained engineer Alan Parsons, "and it was to be recorded using only one microphone. We spent something like four weeks in the studio on it, and came away with no more than one and a half minutes [sic] of music."

Two tracks – "The Hard Way" and "Wine Glasses" (the latter incorporated into the opening of "Shine On You Crazy Diamond") – were released on the Pink Floyd reissues in September and November 2011 on The Dark Side of the Moon (Immersion Box Set) and Wish You Were Here (Experience Version and Immersion Box Set), respectively. "Wine Glasses" was later included on Wish You Were Here's 50th anniversary box set in 2025.

In 2001, Simon Reynolds of The Wire described Household Objects as "a gambit that would have surpassed in advance PiL's Flowers of Romance, ATV's Vibing Up the Senile Man, Nurse With Wound, not to mention Matt Herbert." Open Culture compared the project to similar found sound works, such as those from John Cage and composers of musique concrète. Austin Powell of The Austin Chronicle refers to the recording of Household Objects as "sound-collage sessions" and writes that "The Hard Way" exemplifies "the playful experimentation of the era".

=== Spare Bricks ===
Upon release of the film adaptation of The Wall, Pink Floyd planned to put together an album consisting of songs newly recorded for the film, as well as outtakes from the original Wall LP sessions. The proposed title for this disc was Spare Bricks. This was changed to The Final Cut, which came from the song of the same name. The "When the Tigers Broke Free" single released at this time claim the track comes from the planned album. The Final Cut developed into a new concept album based in part around rewritten versions of The Wall outtakes. From 2004 onwards, Waters decided to incorporate the song into future CD pressings as the fourth track of the album.

=== La Carrera Panamericana ===
New material was recorded at Olympic Studios in November 1991 but not released with The Later Years. Carrera Slow Blues has music similar to Alan's Blues from the Zabriskie Point soundtrack / "Love Scene (Version 6)" from Zabriskie Point.

1. "Country Theme" – 2:01
2. "Small Theme" – 7:23
3. "Big Theme" – 4:10
4. "Carrera Slow Blues" (Gilmour/Wright/Mason) – 2:20
5. "Mexico '78" – 4:05
6. "Pan Am Shuffle" (Gilmour/Wright/Mason) – 8:09

=== The Big Spliff ===
In the 1990s, sound engineer Andy Jackson edited unused material from The Division Bell sessions, described by Mason as ambient music, into an hour-long composition tentatively titled The Big Spliff. Pink Floyd decided not to release it. Part of The Big Spliff was used to create Pink Floyd's fifteenth and final album, The Endless River (2014).

== See also ==
- The Man and The Journey
- Pink Floyd bootleg recordings
- List of songs recorded by Pink Floyd
