= Live at the Roundhouse (Nick Mason's Saucerful of Secrets album) =

Live album by Nick Mason's Saucerful of Secrets
- Released: 18 September 2020
- Genres: Psychedelic rock; progressive rock
- Length: 95:58
- Label: Legacy

Live at the Roundhouse is a live album and film by the English rock band Nick Mason's Saucerful of Secrets, released on 18 September 2020 through Legacy Recordings. It features performances of the early music of Nick Mason's band Pink Floyd.

A single featuring "See Emily Play" and "Vegetable Man" was released for Record Store Day. The album charted across Europe and the UK, reaching the top five of the charts in the UK and Germany.

== Critical reception ==
Glide Magazine's Doug Collette described the album as "not an exercise in nostalgia, but rather a scrupulously-arranged and produced set of music on its own terms, a homage to the original band to be sure, but an honest interpretation thereof". He also felt it is "not respectful to a fault: as indicated by their lively body language and stage presence in general, they are playing with this music as they play it, having some fun with it and imbuing the songs with their individual and collective personalities".

== Track listing ==
=== Disc 1 ===
No.	Title	Writer(s)	Original album	Length
1.	"Interstellar Overdrive"	Syd Barrett, Roger Waters, Richard Wright, Nick Mason	The Piper at the Gates of Dawn	5:49
2.	"Astronomy Domine"	Barrett	The Piper at the Gates of Dawn	4:11
3.	"Fearless"	David Gilmour, Waters	Meddle	5:02
4.	"Obscured by Clouds"	Gilmour, Waters	Obscured by Clouds	4:27
5.	"When You're In"	Gilmour, Waters, Wright, Mason	Obscured by Clouds	1:55
6.	"Remember a Day"	Wright	A Saucerful of Secrets	3:32
7.	"Arnold Layne"	Barrett	"Arnold Layne"/"Candy and a Currant Bun" (single)	3:15
8.	"Vegetable Man"	Barrett	The Early Years 1965–1972	2:27
9.	"If"	Waters	Atom Heart Mother	1:55
10.	"Atom Heart Mother"	Gilmour, Waters, Wright, Mason, Ron Geesin	Atom Heart Mother	7:14
11.	"If (reprise)"	Waters		1:52
12.	"The Nile Song"	Waters	More	3:37

=== Disc 2 ===
No.	Title	Writer(s)	Original album	Length
1.	"Green is the Colour"	Waters	More	4:07
2.	"Let There Be More Light"	Waters	A Saucerful of Secrets	3:37
3.	"Childhood's End"	Gilmour	Obscured by Clouds	3:33
4.	"Set the Controls for the Heart of the Sun"	Waters	A Saucerful of Secrets	12:21
5.	"See Emily Play"	Barrett	"See Emily Play"/"The Scarecrow" (single)	3:03
6.	"Bike"	Barrett	The Piper at the Gates of Dawn	2:23
7.	"One of These Days"	Gilmour, Waters, Wright, Mason	Meddle	5:57
8.	"A Saucerful of Secrets"	Gilmour, Waters, Wright, Mason	A Saucerful of Secrets	9:17
9.	"Point Me at the Sky"	Gilmour, Waters	"Point Me at the Sky"/"Careful With That Axe, Eugene" (single)	3:12

== Charts ==
Chart performance for Live at the Roundhouse
Chart (2020)	Peak position
Austrian Albums (Ö3 Austria)	9
Belgian Albums (Ultratop Flanders)	29
Belgian Albums (Ultratop Wallonia)	19
Dutch Albums (Album Top 100)	44
French Albums (SNEP)	44
German Albums (Offizielle Top 100)	5
Italian Albums (FIMI)	13
Portuguese Albums (AFP)	20
Scottish Albums (Official Charts)	2
Spanish Albums (Promusicae)	39
Swiss Albums (Schweizer Hitparade)	10
UK Albums (Official Charts)	5
UK Rock & Metal Albums (Official Charts)	1
