= Pink Floyd bootleg recordings =

Bootleg discography

Pink Floyd bootleg recordings are the collections of audio and video recordings of musical performances by the English rock band Pink Floyd, which were never officially released by the band. The recordings consist of both live performances and outtakes from studio sessions unavailable in official releases. In some cases, certain bootleg recordings may be highly prized among collectors, as at least 40 songs composed by Pink Floyd have never been officially released.

During the 1970s, bands such as Pink Floyd created a lucrative market for the mass production of unofficial recordings with large followings of fans willing to purchase them. In addition, the huge crowds that turned up to these concerts made the effective policing of the audience for the presence of recording equipment virtually impossible. Vast numbers of recordings were issued for profit by bootleg labels.

Some Pink Floyd bootlegs exist in several variations with differing sound quality and length because sometimes listeners have recorded different versions of the same performance at the same time. Pink Floyd was a group that protected its sonic performance, making recording with amateur recording devices difficult. In their career, Pink Floyd played over 1,300 concerts, of which more than 350 were released as bootlegged recordings (sometimes in various versions). Few concerts have ever been broadcast (or repeated once they were broadcast on television), especially during 'the golden age' of the group from 1966 to 1981.

Pink Floyd was one of the mainstays of the bootleg industry in the 1970s. In 1999, the group was mentioned on BPI's list of most bootlegged British artists of all time.

One of the best known ROIO's by Pink Floyd is Best of Tour '72: Live at the Rainbow Theatre with a concert performed on 20 February 1972. This bootleg includes one of the first performances of The Dark Side of the Moon. One year and one month before the official release of that same album, the bootleg had already sold over 120,000 copies.

In 2008, the Pink Floyd bootleg Madison Square Garden, New York, NY – 2 July 1977 was mentioned on the Yahoo's Top 10 of Best Bootlegs of All Time.

== Earliest bootlegs ==
Most of Pink Floyd's early bootlegs concern performances from the European A Saucerful of Secrets Tour and the A Saucerful of Secrets US Tour. Most of these bootlegs were released by the label "Ace Bootlegs Production".

Bootleg title	Recording details	Notes
BBC Archives 1967–1969	BBC Television Centre, London, UK, 14 May 1967	Television performance. The Pink Floyd appeared on BBC One's "Look of the Week", hosted by Hans Keller. The performance consisted of a truncated version of "Pow R. Toc H." as well as "Astronomy Domine". Syd Barrett and Roger Waters were then interviewed by show host Hans Keller, who memorably asked the band why their music had to be so loud, finding it unbearable. The performance and interview have been repeated on BBC since, and consequently circulate on both audio and video bootlegs. It is one of the few pieces of professionally filmed footage from the Barrett-led era that has survived.
Golden Circle	Gyllene Cirkeln, Stockholm, Sweden, 10 September 1967	This bootleg is considered as the only complete recording of a 1967 concert by Pink Floyd. It includes the show's soundcheck and the 50-minute concert (played at a Swedish restaurant and jazz club called Gyllene Cirkeln a.k.a. Golden Circle). The recording was done by the Swedish sound engineer Anders Lind on his Revox machine. The setlist included "Introduction", "Reaction in G", "Matilda Mother", "Pow R. Toc H.", "Scream Thy Last Scream", "Set the Controls for the Heart of the Sun", "See Emily Play" and "Interstellar Overdrive". Despite the overall quality being very good for the time, the vocals are almost impossible to hear (An indication as to the poor quality of P.A equipment then). This concert was officially released in 2016 on The Early Years 1965–1972.
Feed Your Head	Star Club, Copenhagen, Denmark, 13 September 1967	Audience recording. Also released as "Wonderful, Wonderful Kopenhagen" and "Starclub Psycho". Setlist consists of "Reaction in G", "Arnold Layne", "One in a Million", "Matilda Mother", and "Scream Thy Last Scream".
Playhouse Theatre	The Playhouse Theatre, London, UK, 25 September 1967	Also released as "Hippy Happy Fair". This is a recording made for the BBC Radio series "Top Gear". The circulating track list consists of "The Scarecrow", "The Gnome", "Matilda Mother", "Flaming", "Set the Controls For The Heart Of The Sun", and an incomplete recording of "Reaction in G". Officially released on The Early Years 1965–1972.
The Live Pink Floyd – Oude Ahoy Hallen	Rotterdam, Netherlands, 13 November 1967	Audience recording. Setlist consists of "Reaction in G", "Pow R. Toc H.", "Scream Thy Last Scream", and "Interstellar Overdrive".
BBC Archives 1967–1969	Maida Vale Studios, London, United Kingdom, 20 December 1967	Pink Floyd's second appearance on the BBC Radio show "Top Gear". This was Barrett's last recorded performance with the band. The track list consists of "Vegetable Man", "Scream Thy Last Scream", "Jugband Blues", and "Pow R. Toc H.". Officially released on The Early Years 1965–1972.
Rome Vpro (Broadcast)	First European International Pop Festival, Piper Club, Rome, Italy, 6 May 1968	
Paradiso Amsterdam	Club Paradiso, Amsterdam, Netherlands, 23 May 1968	Audience recording, also released as "Syncopated Pandemonium"
Live in Amsterdam – Fantasio Club	Fantasio Club, Amsterdam, Netherlands, second concert on 23 May 1968	
Shrine Exposition Hall	Shrine Exposition Hall, Los Angeles, 27 July 1968	Audience recording, includes 15:57 version of "A Saucerful of Secrets"
Utrecht '68	Margriethal Jaarbeurs, Utrecht, Netherlands, 28 December 1968	Also released as "Owed to Syd Barrett" The track list consists of "Tunings", "Astronomy Domine", "Careful with that Axe, Eugene", "Interstellar Overdrive", "Set the Controls for the Heart of the Sun" and "A Saucerful of Secrets"

In January 1996, the label See For Miles Records released the bootleg album "Psychedelic Games for May" which includes a collection of Syd Barrett era Floyd, featuring a pre-Floyd acetate, rough mixes of the early singles plus BBC TV and the unreleased single "Scream Thy Last Scream".

As late as 2004, a bootleg album entitled "Outtakes From Outer Space" emerged from Israel on the dubious-sounding "Hippie Shit Label", featuring a compilation of studio session recordings and outtakes, some mentioned above. The track listing was:

1. Lucy Leave (First Pink Floyd-Studio-Session)
2. I'm a King Bee (First Pink Floyd-Studio-Session)
3. Interstellar Overdrive (Studio-Session, 31 October 1966)
4. Astronomy Domine (Live in London, 12 May 1967)
5. Experiment (Studio outtakes 1967)
6. Flaming (BBC-Session, 30 September 1967)
7. The Gnome (BBC-Session, 30 September 1967)
8. Matilda Mother (BBC-Session, 30 September 1967)
9. The Scarecrow (BBC-Session, 30 September 1967)
10. Vegetable Man (BBC-Session, 19 December 1967)
11. Pow R. Toc H. (BBC-Session, 19 December 1967)
12. Scream Thy Last Scream (BBC-Session, 19 December 1967)
13. Jugband Blues (BBC-Session, 19 December 1967)
14. Silas Lane (Studio outtakes 1967)
15. Flaming (Single version, available only on USA Tower label)
16. Reaction in G (Live in Rotterdam 12 October 1967)
17. Milky Way (Studio outtake)

== 1969 ==
Bootleg title	Recording details	Notes
Sound Resounds Around	St. James Hall, Chesterfield, United Kingdom, 27 March 1969	soundboard recording including a 16 minutes version of "Interstellar Overdrive" and a 19:13 version of "A Saucerful of Secrets"
The Massed Gadget of Auximenes	Royal Festival Hall, London, 14 April 1969	audience recording with a performance of "The Man and The Journey"
Beset by the Creatures of the Deep	University of Southampton, England, 9 May 1969	
From the Master Tape	Free Trade Hall, Manchester, England, 22 June 1969	released by the label Ayanami, also released as "The Labyrinths of Auximenes"
A Man and His Lunacy	Royal Albert Hall, London, 26 June 1969	audience recording
Plumpton Race Track	Plumpton Race Track, East Sussex, London, 8 August 1969	audience recording also released as "The Journey Through the Past", live at 9th National Jazz Pop Ballads & Blues Festival, includes a 20:26 version of "A Saucerful of Secrets"
Complete Concertgebouw	Concertgebouw, Amsterdam, Netherlands, 17 September 1969	soundboard recording also released as "A Man and the Journey", "Amsterdam 69 (Swingin' Pig Version)" and "Amsterdam 1969 (Harvest)", plans for an official live album release of "The Man and The Journey" were considered, but abandoned due to overlap of material with Ummagumma. Officially released in 2016 on The Early Years 1965–1972.
Essener Pop Festival	Internationales Essener Pop & Blues Festival, Essen, West Germany, 11 October 1969	released by the label 'Man of Leisure Music', also released as "Essen" and "Song Days '69"
Amougies Pop Festival	Amougies Pop & Jazz Festival, Mont-de-l'Enclus, Belgium, 25 October 1969	first part of a unique concert in Belgium with Frank Zappa as special guest. The complete concert was released on "Interstellar Zappadrive" by Harvested. The songs "Green Is the Colour", "Careful with That Axe, Eugene" and "Set the Controls for the Heart of the Sun" are in soundboard quality, but were performed without Frank Zappa.
Afan Lido	Port Talbot, Wales, 6 December 1969	audience recording, released by Man of Leisure Music.
Ahcid Atthak!	November–December 1969	'Omay Yad'. Also released as 'The Midas Touch' Includes the officially unreleased instrumental "Fingals Cave".

During the two one-week recording sessions in November and December 1969 of the soundtrack for Michelangelo Antonioni's Zabriskie Point at International Recording in Rome, Pink Floyd experienced for the first time a studio leak. Three out-takes appeared on a bootleg album Omay Yad, also known under titles as Oneone, Fingal's Cave and Rain in the Country.

With the advent of a 1997 deluxe reissue of the movie soundtrack on a double compact disc, four previously unreleased Pink Floyd out-takes were also revealed. Almost simultaneously, a 15-track bootleg CD of the complete sessions appeared that revealed additional works in progress, among them a track that was long referred to by Pink Floyd as "The Violent Sequence". It was penned by Richard Wright for a riot scene in the movie and although unreleased in any form officially, was incorporated into their live set as an acoustic piano piece in the early part of the year. It was a forerunner to the melody of "Us and Them", which featured on their 1973 album The Dark Side of the Moon.

== 1970: Atom Heart Mother tour ==
Bootleg title	Recording details	Date	Notes
Biding My Time in Croydon	Fairfield Hall, Croydon, England	18 January 1970	contains a 2:20 concert with an early prototype of "Atom Heart Mother" (then called "The Amazing Pudding", 24:34), "The Violent Sequence" (a 15-minute song with the piano sequence of "Us and Them" included), "Main Theme" from More (14:02) and "A Saucerful of Secrets" (16:54). The bootleg also contains a track from 22 December 1970, "Alan's Psychedelic Breakfast" (24.46)
Elysees Floyd	Théâtre du Rond-Point des Champs-Élysées	23 January 1970	a part of this concert was also released as "The Man-Live in Paris", "Paris 23 January 1970" and "Broadcast from Europe" (containing 3 songs from the performance at Palais des Sports in Lyon on 12 June 1971)
Project Birmingham	Town Hall, Birmingham, England	11 February 1970	audience recording including "The Violence Sequence" (26:31), "Atom Heart Mother" (25:27), a 12 minute version of "The Embryo" and "Sysyphus" (12:09)
Six of One	Leeds University, Yorkshire, England	28 February 1970	contains 6 tracks of over 10 minutes each with a long performance of "A Saucerful of Secrets" (16:13)
A Trick of the Light	Auditorium Maximum, Hamburg University, West Germany	12 March 1970	released by label 'World Production of Compact Music'
The Injustice of a Kaleidoscope of Sound	Konzertsaal, Technische Universität, West Berlin, West Germany	13 March 1970	also released as "Richard, Are You Ready Yet?", this bootleg includes a 15:29 version of "Set the Controls for the Heart of the Sun"
Masters of the Mystic Arts	Meistersingerhalle, Nuremberg, West Germany	14 March 1970	
Hannover	Niedersachsenhalle Hanover, West Germany	15 March 1970	
Lund	Akademiska Forningens, Lund, Sweden,	20 March 1970	
Genuine New York 70	University of New York, Long Island	11 April 1970	released by the labels Monkey Records and Highland (as "Trademark Moo")
Port Chester '70	Port Chester, New York	22 April 1970	contains longer versions of "The Embryo" (15:36), "Cymbaline" (16:24) and "Astronomy Domine" (13:06)
Interstellar Fillmore	Fillmore West, San Francisco, California	29 April 1970	soundboard recording, also released as "Interstellar Encore", "Embryo" and "California Sun"/"California Moon"
KQED	KQED TV Studios, San Francisco, California	30 April 1970	Broadcast recording, also released as "Colourful Meadows"
Fat Old Gig	California, Philadelphia, Birmingham, Sheffield	29 April, 26 September, 2 February 22 December 1970	4 discs bootleg, also partially released as "Electric Factory", "Electric Factory (Harvested version)" and "On Top of the World"
Live in Santa Monica	Santa Monica, Civic center, California	1 May 1970	audience recording, another bootleg named "Santa Monica Civic Auditorium" contains a registration of the same concert
Bath Festival	Bath Festival of Blues & Progressive music, Shepton Mallet, England	26 June 1970	released by the label Ayanami
Stamping Ground	Kralingen Pop Festival, Netherlands	28 June 1970	This bootleg is released by the label Highland and includes a long version of "Interstellar Overdrive" (18:55)
The Theme from an Imaginary Western	Soersfestival 3-Day Open Air Festival, Aachen Soerser Stadium, Aachen, West Germany	12 July 1970	released by R.D.Productions, also released as "Soersfestival in Aachen/A Heavenly Ride"
Phenomena	BBC studios and Paris Cinema, London	17 July 1970 and 19 September 1970	released by Manic Depression, 2 discs with BBC Top Gear sessions and 2 BBC concerts. This bootleg is also released under the names "BBC Archives 1970–1971", "Libest Spacement Monitor", "Pink is the Pig" (with a 1969 version of "Point Me at the Sky"), "Mooed Music" and "Eclipse"
Free Hyde Park Concert	Blackhills Garden Party, Hyde Park, London	18 July 1970	contains only 4 tracks
Foreign Legion	Saint-Tropez, France and Palais des Sports, Lyon, France	8 August 1970 and 12 June 1971	released by the label Head, audience recording
Fête de l'Humanité	Fête de L'Humanité, Bois de Vincennes, Paris, France	12 September 1970	audience recording released by the label "Cochon Productions"
Fillmore East 27 September 1970	Fillmore East, New York City	27 September 1970	
Sing to Me Cymbaline	Santa Monica Civic Center, California	23 October 1970	
Mind Your Throats Please	Concertgebouw, Amsterdam	6 November 1970	contains a long version of "Fat Old Sun" (15:06)
Remergence	Grote Zaal, De Doelen, Rotterdam, Netherlands	7 November 1970	
Pictures of Pink Floyd, Vol. 1	Gothenburg, Sweden and Stadthalle, Offenbach, West Germany	11 November 1970 and 26 February 1971	also released as "The Pictures of Pink Floyd: Restoration Project" and "Command Performance"
Copenhagen Sequence	Falkoner Centre, Copenhagen, Denmark	12 November 1970	Also released as "70/11/12", contains the track "Libest Spacement Monitor".
Denmark Behind Us	Aarhus, Denmark	13 November 1970	
Ernst-Merck-Halle	Ernst-Merck-Halle, Hamburg, West Germany	14 November 1970	also released as "Grooving with a Pict", includes the track "Moonhead (Corrosion)" (13:28)
Smoking Blues	Casino de Montreux, Switzerland	21 November 1970	also released as "Montreux Casino 1970", "Reeling on Pink Floyd" and "The Good ... The Bad", "Too Late for Mind Expanding", soundboard recording including "Just Another Twelve Bar". One song from this concert, "Atom Heart Mother", was officially released on The Early Years 1965–1972.
Mounting Pressure	Friedrich-Ebert-Halle, Ebertpark, Ludwigshafen, West Germany	25 November 1970	
The Killesberg Tapes	Killesberg-Halle, Stuttgart, West Germany	26 November 1970	
Trip Through Germany	Niedersachsenhalle Hanover, West Germany	27 November 1970	
Circus Krone	Circus Krone, Munich, West Germany	29 November 1970	
A Psychedelic Night	City Hall, Sheffield, England	22 December 1970	also released as "Alan Psychedelic Mastertape" and "Rise and Shine" (last mentioned bootleg is considered to contain the best version of "Alan's Psychedelic Breakfast"), the bootleg "A Psychedelic Night" includes "Atom Heart Mother" (31:25 + reprise 2:36), "A Saucerful of Secrets" (23:22) and "Alan's Psychedelic Breakfast" (19:08)

== 1971 ==
At least 34 bootlegs of different concerts from 1971 were released (not counting the several bootlegs of each concert).

- 12 February – Colchester 12 February 1971
- 13 February – Close the Blinds
- 25 February – Live in Hamburg, also released as M502
- 26 February – Pictures of Pink Floyd – Vol.1, also released as Motionless Pictures of Pink Floyd
- 10 March – Rhapsody in Pink
- 3 April – Ahoy Mate, It's 1971, also released on the bootleg The Band Who Ate Asteroids for Breakfast
- 15 May – Echoes of a Distant Time
- 4 June – A New Piece of Music, also released as Philipshalle, Düsseldorf
- 5 June – Mauerspechte, also released as Vierundzwanzig Teile von Nichts
- 12 June – Broadcasting from Europa 1, also released as Foreign Legion and Doctor Strange
- 19 June – Brescia '71
- 20 June – Live in Rome
- 26 June – Amsterdam Free Concert
- 1 July – Cosmic Music
- 6 August – Echoes of Japanese Meddle, also released as Aphrodite (rev. A)
- 6 August – Festival for the Nips
- 13 August – Festival Hall – Melbourne 1971, also released as The Big Pink – Melbourne 1971 and Planets Meeting Down Under
- 8 September – Osaka 1971
- 18 September – Live in Montreux 1971 and Remember the Lesson of Giving
- 23 September – Copenhagen Teatret, also released as Northern Old Sun and Falkoner Theatret
- 30 September – Phenomena, also released as BBC Archives 1970– 1971, Eclipse, One of These Days and From Oblivion. Officially released on The Early Years 1965–1972.
- 4 October – Pompeii (Harvested Version), also released as Live at pompeii
- 10 October – One of These Days in Bradford, also released as Return from Pompei
- 16 October – Motionless Albatross, also released as The Eye of Agamotto
- 17 October – From Oblivion, also released as Life Could Be a Dream and as Wind and Seabirds
- 27 October – Echoes in the Auditorium
- 28 October – Hill Auditorium
- 31 October – Toledo
- 5 November – Hunter College
- 6 November – For Reasons I Don't Understand
- 10 November – Labyrinths
- 12 November – Those Were the Days, also Echoes in Irvine
- 16 November – Return of the Sons of Nothing, also released as Something from Nothing
- 20 November – The Complete Taft Tapes, also released as Strange Tales and Embryonic Madness

== Dark Side of the Moon Tour ==
Sometimes the smaller record mastering and pressing plants simply hid the bootleg work when record company executives would come around (in which case the printed label could show the artist and song names) and other times they would print labels with fictitious names. For example, the 1972 Pink Floyd bootleg called Brain Damage was released under the name The Screaming Abdabs.

In January 1972, Pink Floyd debuted the live performance of their album The Dark Side of the Moon before its release. Many of Pink Floyd bootlegs date back from this period. Most of these bootlegs contain a pre-release version of the entire album.

=== 1972 ===
- 20 January – The Dark Side Rehearsals, also released as Eclipsed by the Moon and Here They Come
- 21 January – Eclipsed by the Moon, also released as Portsmouth
- 22 January – The Dark Side of Winter Gardens
- 23 January – Southampton Docks Eclipsed by the Moon
- 28 January – You Are Number Six
- 17 February –
- 18 February – Rainbow Day 2
- 20 February – The Best of Tour 72, also released as Time Ends and Rainbow Theatre, Moon Walk, In Rainbow Light (complete 2 CD show)
- 6 March – Taiikukan 6 March 1972, also released as Acid Moon
- 7 March – Tokyo to Taiikukan, also released as Live in Tokyo 1972
- 8 March – Echoes from Osaka
- 10 March – Home Again Kyoto
- 13 March – Hokkaido, also released as Sapporo and as The Great Gig on The Moon
- 30 March – Run Rabbit Run
- 15 April – Sportarium
- 16 April – Paper Money, also released as Take Up My Stethoscope and Columbia Sonicwave
- 20 April – Syria Mosque Theater
- 23 April – Cincinnati 72, also released as Mad for F*****g Years
- 26 April – Detroit MI Ford Auditorium Pink Floyd – War in the Head
- 27 April – Detroit MI Ford Auditorium Pink Floyd – War in the Head
- 28 April – Eclipse – A Piece for Assorted Lunatics, also released as Hogweed Remaster
- 2 May – Carnegie Hall Upgrade
- 4 May – Mademoiselle Pink
- 18 May – Lord of the Universe
- 21 May – Sorcerers Supreme, also released as Gemersheim Festival, as Doubled Bubble and as Calling Number 228
- 22 May – Rock Circus
- 28 June – Return from Dark Profound
- 10 September – McFarlin Auditorium – Dallas
- 22 September – Bowl de Luna, also released as Cracked, Staying Home to Watch the Rain, From Box 1432, The Bright Side of the Earth and Damn Braces, Bless Relaxes
- 23 September – Winterland '72, also released as Time & Money in California
- 21 October – Gathering on the Moon
- 10 November – Doctor Who in Denmark
- 12 November – German Tour 72 Vol.3
- 14 November – Düsseldorf Master Tape
- 15 November – The Return of the Sons of Nothing, also released as The Great Gig in Böblingen
- 16 November – March of the Dambusters
- 17 November – Last Day in Germany, also released as One of Those Days
- 29 November – Any Colour You Like, also released as All Your Life Will Ever Be and The Devils Inside
- 1 December – Remembrance of Things Past, also released as Blow Your Mind Until You Die
- 2 December – Saint-Ouen 2 December 1972
- 7 December – Filling a Gap
- 9 December – In a Neutral Land
- 10 December – Across the Swiss Border, also released as End and Aim

=== 1973 ===
- 13 January – A Night with Roland
- 6 March – The Valley of the Kings
- 7 March – Childhood's End (Chicago)
- 8 March – Beneath Infinite Sky
- 10 March – Thoughts and Memories, also released as Kent State Master
- 11 March – Yeeshkul!
- 14 March – Boston USA
- 18 March – Dark Side of Radio City, also released Quiet Desperation in New York, Waterbury 18 March 1973 (Collector's Edition) and 3 Source Matrix [This show is usually listed as being at Radio 'City Music Hall in NYC but is actually from the Palace Theatre in Waterbury, Connecticut. A show was played at Radio City the previous night on 17 March]
- 18 May – Earl's Court – Day One
- 19 May – Supine in the Sunshine
- 16 June – New Jersey 16 June 1973
- 17 June – Saratoga Master, also released as On Stage
- 20 June – Breaking Bottles in the Hall, also released as War Memorial
- 28 June – Not a Cloud in the Sky
- 29 June – Tampa
- 12 October – Munich 1973 (Collector's Edition), also released as Paranoid Delusions
- 13 October – The Lunatics on the Run, also released as Revealed
- 4 November – Revealed at the Rainbow (Early Show)
- 4 November – Live at the Rainbow (Late Show), also released as Obscured at the Rainbow and Finnsbury Park

The bootleg Supine in the Sunshine contains an audience live recording with extended versions of two songs from the soundtrack Obscured by Clouds (1972); namely the title track (5:38) and "When You're In" (7:48).

Yeeshkul! is so named because the bootlegger, or someone close to him, mentions the word several times during the performance. The name inspired a forum for discussing Pink Floyd bootlegs which closed on 28 February 2023.

== Pink Floyd 1974 tours ==
- 22 June – Colmar
- 24 June – Paris, 24 June 1974
- 4 November – Picts in the Highland
- 15 November – Black Holes in the Sky (rev. A), also named We Are from Planet Earth
- 16 November – Dark Soundboard of Philadelphia, also named BBC Archives 74, Wembley 1974, Time in London, The Moon, No Room Upon the Hill and Interstellar Highlights
- 17 November – Getting Better All the Time, also named Little Lambs Eat Ivy
- 19 November – British Winter Tour
- 28 November – Empire Theater 74
- 9 December – The Kings of the Palace
- 14 December – Bristol 13 December 1974, also named Heavy Fog in Bristol

The bootleg British Winter Tour, a recording of the 19 November show in Stoke-on-Trent was a notable bootleg released in 1975. It featured the three new songs that Pink Floyd were playing on that tour. It sold an estimated 50,000 copies. The record was issued with the lyrics to the songs, and the quality of presentation convinced a number of buyers that the album was a bona fide follow-up to The Dark Side of the Moon. The British Phonographic Industry were not impressed, and attempted to find out who the bootleggers were, with the intent of prosecuting them.

== Wish You Were Here Tour (1975) ==
- 8 April – Azimuth Coordinator, Part 1
- 10 April – Seattle Coliseum
- 13 April – Cow Palace Day 2
- 21 April – San Tiago
- 26 April – Movin' Time, also released as Dogs and Sheeps (sic) and Cruel, But Fair
- 9 June – Landover, Maryland
- 10 June – Shone Like the Sun
- 15 June – Jersey Not Mother
- 16 June – Random Precision
- 17 June – Nassau Day 2, als released as Wishes, Echoes & Desires
- 18 June – Echoes in the Gardens (version 2-cd), also released as Echoes in the Gardens (version 3-cd), Boston Gardens Masters, Boston 1975, Spaceball Ricochet and Echoes of the Stage
- 20 June – Rivers of Steel
- 22 June – Heavy Rain
- 24 June – Detroit, also released as Detroit 1975
- 28 June – Ivor Wynne, also released as Steel Breeze
- 5 July – Knebworth '75 and Wish Roy Was in Knebworth

== In the Flesh Tour (1977) ==
- 23 January – Bugger's Eyes, also released as Animals Tour Debut and Dortmunds
- 24 January – Animals in Dortmund
- 27 January – From the Masters – Francfort 77, a.k.a. Heart Beat, Pig Meat
- 29 January – Animals from the soundboard, The dark side of the pig, Desk pig in Berlin
- 1 February – Dark side from the pig
- 30 January – Absolut Floyd
- 1 February – Vienna '77, a.k.a. Vienna stadthalle master, Reeling in Vienna, Animalisation, Hot ashes for tree (hcv version)
- 3 February – Look over Jordan
- 4 February – With Bright Knives
- 19 February – Rotterdam 77
- 20 February – Ducks on the wall
- 22 February – Pavillon de pigs
- 23 February – Paris 1977
- 24 February – Pavillon de Paris
- 25 February – Unauthorized live volume 2
- 27 February – Wolfsschanze
- 15 March – Knobs
- 18 March – Animals on Empire
- 19 March – Wembley 1977 March 19
- 31 March – Last nite in Stafford
- 22 April – Hurricane Floyd hits Miami, a.k.a. Miami baseball stadium
- 24 April – Tampa 1977
- 26 April – Southern bbq
- 28 April – Assembly center
- 30 April – Deaf, dumb and blind
- 1 May – Iron pigs on fire
- 6 May – The evil tide
- 9 May – The abdabs, a.k.a. Animal instincts, Mr pig, Welcome to the Machine (oakland)
- 19 June – Chicago 1977
- 25 June – Animals in Cleveland
- 27 June – Hot ashes for trees – the curse from the pig, a.k.a. Have a Cigar, The Perfect Day, Boston gardens
- 1 July – New pork
- 2 July – In a Pig's Eye, also released as In the grassland away
- 3 July – Pigs might fly
- 4 July – Sheep independence day, a.k.a. An even smile
- 6 July – Oink oink baaa, also released with titles as Who was trained not to spit on the fans, Azimuth coordinator, part 2 and All is forgiven

The bootleg Animals Instincts concerns the recording of the Pink Floyd concert at 9 May 1977, at the Oakland Coliseum in Oakland.

== The Wall Tour (1980–1981) ==
- – "Under Construction", also released as "The Wall Demos" (demo tape from the recording of The Wall in 1978, unofficially released by bootleggers. The songs here are not the same versions as those officially released on The Wall album.)
- 1 February – "The Wall Rehearsals", also released as "Behind the Wall" and "Brick by Brick"
- 7 February – "Azimuth Coordinator, part 3" a.k.a. "The Wall – Sport Arena L.A."
- 8 February – "The Wall 08 feb 80"
- 10 February – "The Wall – L.A. Sport Arena"
- 13 February – "L.A. Sport Arena – 2/13/1980"
- 28 February 1980 – Untitled LP with "hammers" cover, also released as "Behind the Wall", "Brick by Brick", "Nassau Coliseum Definitive Edition" and "The Wall From The Master Tape"
- 6 August – "The Show Must Go On", a.k.a. "The Wall on wrpi 91.5" and "Bars in the Window"
- 8 August – "The Wall Earl's Court 8 August 1980"
- 9 August – "Divided We Fall", also released as "The Wall Live at Earls Court August 9, 1980"
- 14 February – "Tear Down The Wall (Zeus version)"
- 18 February – "The Wall – Dortmund 18 February 1981"
- 19 February – "Tear Down The Wall"
- 20 February – "The Wall Dortmund Germany 20 feb. 1981"
- 16 June – "Watching The World Upon The Wall"
- 17 June – "Live Wall", a.k.a. "The Wall Earl's Court June 17th 1981"

== A Momentary Lapse of Reason Tour (1987–1989) ==
- 9 September – "A New Era"
- 12 September – "Montreal Day One", a.k.a. "Echoes by the Lake" and "Final Echoes" (including a complete version of Echoes)
- 16 September – "Echoes by the Lake"
- 19 September – "Prism"
- 28 September – "A Clear View", also released as "On The Turning Away"
- 10 October – "Pink Floyd live in East Rutherford 1987 – 2CD – October 10" (140:17 Mins)
- 17 October – "Pink Floyd live in Providence 1987 – 2CD – October 17"
- 30 September – "Delusions of Maturity"
- 1 November – "Pink Floyd live in Miami 1987" [Soundboard Recording]
- 03-05/11/1987 – "Would You Buy a Ticket to This Show?"
- 26 November – "World Tour"
- 27 November – "Pink Floyd live in Los Angeles 1987 – 2CD – November 27"
- 27 January - "Pink Floyd Sydney 27 January 1988", the first show of the Australian Leg of their tour
- 11 February – Live In Adelaide 11 2 88
- 2 March – Another Lapse in Japan
- 4 June – "When You Are Young"
- 7 June – "Pink Elephants Flew over Torino"
- 21 June – "Château de Versailles (1st day)"
- 22 June – "Château de Versailles (2nd day)"
- 8 July – "Nothing is Changed"
- 2 August – "Another Movie in Long Island" – Live at Nassau Coliseum, Uniondale, New York, USA
- 3 June – "Moscow"
- 7 July – "Dockland Arena"
- 15 July – "A Venezia" [Soundboard Recording]
- 30 June – "The Knebworth Tales '90", a.k.a. "Of Promise Broken" (not part of the A Momentary Lapse of Reason Tour) [Soundboard Recording]

== The Division Bell Tour (1994) ==
- 16 March – Norton Air Force Rehearsals (≈ soundboard recording of rehearsal)
- 30 March – The Live Bell
- 14 April – For Whom The Bell Tolls
- 16 April – Your Favorite Disease
- 17 April – Jurassic Sparks
- 6 May – Just Warmin' Up (Rehearsals)
- 11 June – The Bell Gets Louder
- 30 July – Bells From Notre Dame
- 30 August – Fly Again The only recorded Pink Floyd Performance of Marooned
- 9 September – Confortablement Engourdi en France
- 11 September – Lyon 94
- 13 September – A Passage of Time (≈ soundboard recording)
- 17 September – Mutinae
- 17 September – The Concert in Modena
- 19 September – The Nights of Wonder
- 21 September – The Nights of Wonder
- 20 October – Out Of This World (Broadcast/Soundboard, Later Officially released As P.U.L.S.E DVD & Including un-edited Songs)
- 29 October – The Last Ever Show
- 29 October – The Last Bell

== 2000s ==
- 2 July – Live 8, their performance at Live 8

The classic line up of Pink Floyd (David Gilmour, Roger Waters, Richard Wright and Nick Mason) played together on stage for the first time in 24 years (the band toured without Waters in 1987–1989 and 1994).

The band performed the songs "Speak to Me", "Breathe / Breathe (Reprise)", "Money", "Wish You Were Here" and "Comfortably Numb". They were the only band not to be verbally introduced; instead the house and stage lights were darkened while the introduction to "Speak to Me" was played, accompanied on the video screens by an animated version of the heart monitor graphic from The Dark Side of the Moon sleeve. Due to the death of Richard Wright in September 2008, this would be the only reunion of all four members of the post-Syd Barrett incarnation of the band.

- 2 July – No More Excuses – Hyde Park – Live 8 (BBC Radio 2 FM Live Broadcast SB)
- 10 May – Syd Barrett Tribute London, Barbican Centre, two bonus tracks ("Arnold Layne" and "Bike") on the bootleg "David Gilmour & Rick Wright live in Copenhagen 1988"

== Recent releases ==
The bootleg label The Godfather released in March 2011 an 8-CD box set of Pink Floyd songs called The Complete Rainbow Tapes. The box contains four Pink Floyd shows, recorded at the Rainbow Theatre in London (17–20 February 1972).

In 2012 The Godfather label released a 10-CD box set of Pink Floyd songs called The Massed Gadgets of Hercules 1970–1974. The box contains five Pink Floyd shows, recorded at 14 March 1970, Live at Meistersingerhalle, Nürnberg, West Germany / 13 February 1971, Live at Students Union Bar, Technical College, Farnborough, Hampshire, England / 16 April 1972, Live at Township Auditorium, Columbia, South Carolina, USA / 12 October 1973, Live at Olympiahalle, München, West Germany / 14 December 1974, Live at Colston Hall, Bristol, Somerset, England.

== See also ==
- "The Man" and "The Journey"
- The Dark Side of the Moo
- List of unreleased songs recorded by Pink Floyd
- List of songs recorded by Pink Floyd
