= The Amazing Pudding (disambiguation) =

The Amazing Pudding was a British fan magazine devoted to Pink Floyd.

The Amazing Pudding may also refer to:

- An early title for the Pink Floyd work "Atom Heart Mother"
- The Amazing Pudding (album), 1998 bootleg album
