= Childhood's End (Pink Floyd song) =

Song by Pink Floyd

Song by Pink Floyd

from the album Obscured by Clouds
- Released: 3 June 1972
- Recorded: March 1972
- Studio: Château d'Hérouville, Pontoise, France
- Genre: Progressive rock, hard rock
- Length: 4:33
- Label: Harvest
- Songwriter: David Gilmour
- Producer: Pink Floyd

"Childhood's End" is a song from Pink Floyd's 1972 album Obscured by Clouds. It was the last Pink Floyd song to feature lyrics written by David Gilmour, until A Momentary Lapse of Reason in 1987. The song gets its title from the 1953 science-fiction novel of the same name by Arthur C. Clarke, though the theme of the song shares little with the story. The 2016 remixed version of "Childhood's End" which appears in The Early Years 1965–1972 box set was released as the second single to promote the box set in October 2016.

== Lyrics and composition ==
"Childhood's End" is about the stress and pressure of becoming an adult and being faced with difficult decisions on one's own.

The song's intro lasts nearly one-and-a-half minutes, and features an ambient organ.

== Live ==
"Childhood's End" was performed live during Pink Floyd's European tour in late 1972 and at a few shows in March 1973 on their next North American tour. The live versions usually featured a fairly long instrumental section not found in the studio version, with an exception being the last version played on 10 March 1973 at Kent State University, when they stuck to the studio arrangement. The live versions were also performed in F-sharp minor, a step higher than the studio version (E minor). Nick Mason's Saucerful of Secrets resurrected the song for their 2019 and 2022 tours. A recording is included on their 2020 live album Live at the Roundhouse.

== Personnel ==
- David Gilmour – lead vocals, acoustic and electric guitars
- Roger Waters – bass guitar
- Richard Wright – Hammond organ, EMS VCS 3
- Nick Mason – drums
