= Live in Rome =

Live in Rome may refer to:

== Albums ==
- Live In Rome, album by The Tallis Scholars 2002
- Live in Rome, from Pink Floyd bootleg recordings
- Live In Rome, jazz album by Sun Ra
- Live In Rome, 1979 jazz album by Bill Evans
