= Feed Your Head =

Feed Your Head may refer to:

- Feed Your Head, an album from Pink Floyd bootleg recordings
- "Feed your Head", the refrain of "White Rabbit" written by Grace Slick
