= The Nile Song =

1969 single by Pink Floyd

Single by Pink Floyd

from the album More
- B-side: "Ibiza Bar" (France and New Zealand); "Main Theme" (Japan)
- Released: July 1969
- Recorded: February 1969
- Genre: Hard rock; heavy metal; acid rock
- Length: 3:27
- Label: Columbia; Harvest
- Songwriter: Roger Waters
- Producer: Pink Floyd

Pink Floyd singles chronology
"Point Me at the Sky" (1968)	"The Nile Song" (1969)	"One of These Days" (1971)

"The Nile Song", written by Roger Waters and sung by David Gilmour, is the second song from Pink Floyd's 1969 album More, the soundtrack to the film of the same name. It was released as a single in 1969 (only in France, Japan and New Zealand), and included on the 1971 compilation album Relics. While Pink Floyd never played the song in concert, Nick Mason's Saucerful of Secrets performed it in 2018.

While the rest of the More album was issued in true stereo, "The Nile Song" was mixed in mono and processed into Duophonic stereo for release.

== Composition ==
Andy Kellman of AllMusic feels that "The Nile Song" is "one of the heaviest songs the band ever recorded". The chord progression is a series of modulations, beginning at A and then rising a whole step with each repeat, cycling through six different keys, returning to the starting point of A and continuing this pattern as the song fades out. The song's style has been described as heavy metal, acid rock and hard rock.

== Personnel ==
- David Gilmour – vocals, guitar
- Roger Waters – bass
- Nick Mason – drums

== Live performances ==
Mason has performed the song live, with his band Nick Mason's Saucerful of Secrets. A recording is included on their 2020 live album Live at the Roundhouse.

== Covers ==
"The Nile Song" was covered by:

- The Human Instinct, on their 1971 album Pins In It.
- The Necros, on their 1986 album Tangled Up.
- Red Temple Spirits, on their 1988 album Dancing to Restore an Eclipsed Moon.
- The Melvins, live at UCLA in 1993.
- Panthers, on their 2004 album Things Are Strange.
- The Morlocks, on their 1991 album Wake Me When I'm Dead.
- Voivod, on their 1993 album The Outer Limits.
- Dreadnaught, on their 2001 EP One Piece Missing.
- Gov't Mule, on their 2018 tour Dark Side of the Mule
