= Jimmy Gardner (actor) =

English actor (1924–2010)

Jimmy Gardner DFM
- Born: Edward Charles James Gardner; 24 August 1924; Newmarket, Suffolk, England
- Died: 3 May 2010 (aged 85); London, England
- Occupation: Actor
- Years active: 1954–2005

Edward Charles James Gardner (24 August 1924 – 3 May 2010) was an English actor.

== Early life ==
Gardner was born in Newmarket, Suffolk, England, on 24 August 1924.

During World War II, Gardner served in the Royal Air Force as an air gunner with No. 10 Squadron. He completed 30 sorties as a Halifax rear gunner and was awarded the Distinguished Flying Medal.

== Career ==
After the war, Gardner studied at the Central School of Speech and Drama, working in Rep after graduation, later working for the Royal Shakespeare Company for a decade. His first film appearance was in The Curse of the Mummy's Tomb released during 1964. Thereafter he appeared in over 30 films and also made extensive TV and theatre appearances. Some of his best known Shakespearean roles such as Adam in As You Like It, and Gravedigger in Hamlet were performed under the direction of Terry Hands.

Gardner played Knight Bus driver Ernie Prang in Harry Potter and the Prisoner of Azkaban, the third film in the Harry Potter film series.

== Death ==
Gardner died in London, on 3 May 2010, at the age of 85.

== Filmography ==
- Doctor Who: Marco Polo (1964) .... Chenchu
- The Curse of the Mummy's Tomb (1964) .... Fred's Mate
- He Who Rides a Tiger (1965) .... Waiter
- The Murder Game (1965) .... Arthur Gillett
- Arabesque (1966) .... Hemsley (uncredited)
- The Committee (1968) .... Boss
- Take a Girl Like You (1970) .... Voter
- Say Hello to Yesterday (1971) .... Balloon Seller (uncredited)
- 10 Rillington Place (1971) .... Mr Lynch
- Up the Chastity Belt (1971) .... Little Man
- Frenzy (1972) .... Hotel Porter
- Ooh… You Are Awful (1972) .... Waterloo Porter (uncredited)
- The Unpleasantness at the Bellona Club (TV mini-series, 1973) .... Mr. Munns (ep. 4)
- Take Me High (1973) .... Hulbert
- 11 Harrowhouse (1974) .... Man in Snack Bar (uncredited)
- Percy's Progress (1974) .... Clerk of Court (uncredited)
- Slade in Flame (1975) .... Charlie's Dad
- Short Ends (1976) .... Alchemist
- Doctor Who: Underworld (1978) .... Idmon
- Tess (1979) .... Pedlar
- The Company of Wolves (1984) .... Ancient
- Mountains of the Moon (1990) .... Jarvis
- Robin Hood: Prince of Thieves (1991) .... Farmer
- Thin Ice (1995) .... Old Man with gun
- Gunslinger's Revenge (Italian title: Il mio West) (1998) .... Sam Comet
- Harry Potter and the Prisoner of Azkaban (2004) .... Ernie the Bus Driver
- Finding Neverland (2004) .... Mr. Snow
- Deuce Bigalow: European Gigolo (2005) .... Kaiser (final film role)
