= More (soundtrack) =

1969 studio album by Pink Floyd

Studio album / soundtrack album by Pink Floyd
- Released: 13 June 1969
- Recorded: January–February 1969
- Studios: Pye, London
- Genre: Psychedelic rock
- Length: 44:57
- Label: EMI Columbia
- Producer: Pink Floyd

Pink Floyd chronology
A Saucerful of Secrets (1968)	More (1969)	Ummagumma (1969)

Singles from More
- 1. "The Nile Song" Released: July 1969

More is the first soundtrack album and third studio album by English rock band Pink Floyd. It was released on 13 June 1969 in the United Kingdom by EMI Columbia and on 9 August 1969 in the United States by Tower Records. The soundtrack is for the film of the same title, which was primarily filmed on location on Ibiza and was the directorial debut of Barbet Schroeder. It was the band's first album in which their former frontman and principal songwriter Syd Barrett had no involvement.

The album was a top ten hit in the UK, but received mixed reviews. Several songs were performed in Pink Floyd concerts over the following years.

== Background and recording ==
Pink Floyd recorded several pieces of film music before this album. They were featured on the BBC's Tomorrow's World in December 1967, playing along to a light show, and in the following year they recorded some instrumental music for the film The Committee.

Director Barbet Schroeder was a fan of Pink Floyd, and brought a rough cut of the film to London for them to work with. Instead of typical background music, he wanted the songs to feature in the film, such as a record playing at a party (i.e. diegetic music). The group speculated that they could branch out into a career as film composers if their recording and touring career did not work out. Drummer Nick Mason later said the film was "ideally suited to some of the rumblings, squeaks and sound textures we produced on a regular basis".

The album was recorded at Pye Studios in London in late January and early February 1969, with engineer Brian Humphries. The album was the first to be produced by Pink Floyd without assistance from Norman Smith (who nevertheless retained an executive producer credit) and the group's first full album without Syd Barrett, who had left them in 1968 during the recording of their second album, A Saucerful of Secrets.

Pink Floyd worked out most of the music in two weeks, with material put together quickly and semi-improvised. They did not use a dubbing studio due to budget constraints, and simply timed sequences in the film with a stopwatch so they knew how long the music had to be. Bassist Roger Waters wrote most of the lyrics during breaks between recording backing tracks. Schroeder was impressed by how quickly the group created and recorded the material. Mason and keyboardist Richard Wright co-wrote the instrumental "Up The Khyber", the only time the pair were credited as sole co-composers. Barrett's replacement, David Gilmour, handled all lead vocals on the album.

== Composition and music ==
More features a mixture of styles. Songs such as "Green is the Colour" were acoustic folk ballads, a genre not often explored by the group. Mason's wife Lindy played penny whistle on the track. The album also contains hard rock, such as "The Nile Song" and "Ibiza Bar", as well as several instrumental tracks such as "Quicksilver" and "Main Theme", featuring their experimental and avant-garde approach. "Cymbaline" criticised the music industry, with lines such as "your manager and agent are both busy on the phone". The version on the album is different from that in the film. Gilmour sings lead on both versions, though Waters is sometimes wrongly credited as singing lead for the film version. The album also contains elements of electronic and mood music.

"Green is the Colour" was played live frequently after release, as a medley with "Careful With That Axe, Eugene", as part of a live suite called "The Journey". It was a regular feature in the set for two years afterwards. "Quicksilver" was played under the title "Sleeping" as part of the 1969 live show called "The Man", while "Cymbaline" was entitled "Nightmare". The latter remained part of the group's repertoire until the end of 1971. In live performances, the group left the stage partway through the song while the audience listened to a tape of quadraphonic sound effects, including doors opening and footsteps travelling round the venue. "Main Theme" was briefly played live in 1970. “Up the Khyber” was a studio take of a Wright/Mason duo segment that regularly featured in live versions of “Interstellar Overdrive” during this era.

Three songs can be heard in the film which were not included on the album: “Seabirds,” "Hollywood" and "Theme (Beat)" ~ a tempo variation of “Main Theme”. The first of these was published in 1976's The Pink Floyd Songbook. The latter two as well as “More Blues (Alternative Version)" were released on the 2016 box set The Early Years 1965–1972. Another track titled "Seabirds" in the box set is not the original song, but an alternative take of "Quicksilver". The set in which these tracks appear, 1969: Dramatis/ation, was made available as a standalone release in 2017.

Tracks like "Crying Song" and "Cymbaline" play on female lead actress Mimsy Farmer's transistor radio as she is in her apartment, and "Ibiza Bar" (as the title implies) plays in the background in a bar. These differ from tracks such as "Up The Khyber" that plays to the action of the film, in which the band are actual composers, or tracks such as "Cirrus Minor" and "Green is the Colour" that play to orchestrate the mood of the scene, and these tracks (and others), unlike "Crying Song" and "Cymbaline", are not heard by any of the characters.

== Artwork ==
The album cover was, like that of A Saucerful of Secrets, designed by Hipgnosis. It uses a shot from the film, of two characters playing around a windmill in Ibiza, which has been processed in a dark room to make it look like a psychedelic trip.

== Release and reception ==
Professional ratings
Review scores
Source	Rating
AllMusic	3/5 stars
The Daily Telegraph	3/5 stars
Encyclopedia of Popular Music	2/5 stars
MusicHound	1/5
The Rolling Stone Album Guide	2/5 stars
Tom Hull	B−

More reached number 9 in the UK and, upon re-release in 1973, number 153 in the US. This was the last of three Pink Floyd albums to be released in the United States by the Tower Records division of Capitol Records. "The Nile Song" was released as a single in France, Japan and New Zealand around the same time. The track, along with "Cirrus Minor", appeared on the 1971 compilation Relics.

A 1973 US reissue was released on Harvest Records. It was certified gold in the US on 11 March 1994. The album was reissued on CD in 1985, with a digitally remastered version following in 1995. In 2016, it was reissued on Pink Floyd Records.

More received mixed reviews from critics. Record Song Book said the album was "always extremely interesting ... quite weird in parts too". The Daily Telegraph was favourable, describing it as starting to "define experimental instrumental identity". MusicHound and Rolling Stone were less positive, with the former giving the album a rating of one out of five and the latter calling it a "dull film soundtrack".

=== Legacy ===
Richie Unterberger of AllMusic gives a mixed overview, saying that key tracks such as "Green Is The Colour" and "Cymbaline" developed into stronger pieces when played live.

== Track listing ==
All tracks written by Pink Floyd (Roger Waters, Richard Wright, Nick Mason and David Gilmour) except where noted; all tracks sung by Gilmour.

Side one
No.	Title	Writer(s)	Length
1.	"Cirrus Minor"	Waters	5:18
2.	"The Nile Song"	Waters	3:26
3.	"Crying Song"	Waters	3:33
4.	"Up the Khyber" (instrumental)	Mason, Wright	2:12
5.	"Green Is the Colour"	Waters	2:58
6.	"Cymbaline"	Waters	4:50
7.	"Party Sequence" (instrumental)		1:07
Total length:			23:24

Side two
No.	Title	Writer(s)	Length
1.	"Main Theme" (instrumental)		5:27
2.	"Ibiza Bar"		3:19
3.	"More Blues" (instrumental)		2:12
4.	"Quicksilver" (instrumental)		7:13
5.	"A Spanish Piece"	Gilmour	1:05
6.	"Dramatic Theme" (instrumental)		2:15
Total length:			21:32

== Personnel ==
- David Gilmour – vocals, electric guitar (2, 3, 8–11, 13), acoustic guitar (1, 5), classical guitar (3, 6, 12), percussion (12)
- Nick Mason – drums (2–4, 8–10, 13), bongos (6, 7), percussion (11)
- Roger Waters – bass guitar (1–6, 8–10, 13), tape effects, percussion
- Richard Wright – Farfisa organ (1, 4–6, 8–9, 11, 13), piano (4–6, 9), vibraphone (3, 11), Hammond organ (1), backing vocals

Additional personnel

- Lindy Mason – tin whistle (5, 7)
- Brian Humphries – engineering
- Hipgnosis – sleeve design
- James Guthrie – re-mastering supervision
- Doug Sax – re-mastering

== Charts ==
1969 weekly chart performance for More
Chart (1969)	Peak position
Dutch Albums (Album Top 100)	14
UK Albums (Official Charts)	9

1973 weekly chart performance for More
Chart (1973)	Peak position
US Billboard 200	153

2011 weekly chart performance for More
Chart (2011)	Peak position
French Albums (SNEP)	128

== Certifications ==
Certifications for More
Region	Certification	Certified units/sales
France (SNEP)	Gold	100,000^{*}
^{*} Sales figures based on certification alone.
