= Green Is the Colour =

Song by Pink Floyd

Song by Pink Floyd

from the album Soundtrack from the Film More
- Released: 13 June 1969
- Recorded: March 1969
- Genre: Psychedelic folk
- Length: 2:58
- Label: EMI Columbia (UK); Tower (US)
- Songwriter: Roger Waters
- Producer: Pink Floyd

"Green Is the Colour" is a track on Pink Floyd's 1969 album More. It was composed and written by Roger Waters and sung by David Gilmour. A tin whistle is heard in the song, played by drummer Nick Mason's then-wife Lindy. A live version of the song was released as the third single to promote The Early Years 1965–1972 box set in October 2016.

== Live ==
Live arrangements of the song were performed as a full electric band piece and at a slower tempo. Richard Wright played organ sound throughout, which segued into the piece that always immediately followed it, "Careful with That Axe, Eugene". David Gilmour also sang a scat vocal over his guitar solo during the outro. In a live intro to the song from 1970, Roger Waters states that the song is "about being on Ibiza" the setting of the film, More.

In The Man and The Journey suite, the song was retitled "The Beginning" in "The Journey" half of the show. It was played as a medley with "Beset by the Creatures of the Deep", which was a retitling of "Careful with That Axe, Eugene".

The song was a regular part of the band's shows from early 1969 through 1970, then less common in 1971. It was played for the last time during their short tour of Japan and Australia in August 1971. The song was later played by Nick Mason's Saucerful of Secrets. A recording is included on their 2020 live album Live at the Roundhouse.

== Personnel ==
Studio recording

- David Gilmour – lead vocals, acoustic guitars
- Richard Wright – piano, Farfisa organ
- Roger Waters – bass guitar

with:

- Lindy Mason – tin whistle

Live performances

- David Gilmour – electric guitar, lead vocals
- Richard Wright – piano, Farfisa organ
- Roger Waters – bass guitar
- Nick Mason – drums

Nick Mason's Saucerful of Secrets

- Nick Mason – drums
- Gary Kemp – electric guitar, lead vocals
- Lee Harris – acoustic guitar
- Guy Pratt – bass guitar, backing vocals
- Dom Beken – piano, backing vocals
