= The Early Years 1965–1972 =

2016 box set by Pink Floyd

Box set by Pink Floyd
- Released: 11 November 2016
- Recorded: 1964–1972, 1974
- Genres: Progressive rock; psychedelic rock; space rock; experimental rock
- Length: 29:04:36 (1744:36 in minutes)
- Label: Pink Floyd Records
- Producers: Pink Floyd; Joe Boyd; Norman Smith; Jeff Griffin

Pink Floyd chronology
1965: Their First Recordings (2015)	The Early Years 1965–1972 (2016)	The Later Years 1987–2019 (2019)

Singles from The Early Years 1967–1972
- 1. "Grantchester Meadows" Released: 31 August 2016; 2. "Childhood's End" Released: 6 October 2016; 3. "Green is the Colour" Released: 26 October 2016; 4. "Nothing, Pt. 14" Released: 9 November 2016

The Early Years 1965–1972 is a box set that compiles early recordings by the English rock band Pink Floyd, released on 11 November 2016. It was released by Pink Floyd Records with distribution held by Warner Music for the UK and Europe and Sony Music for the rest of the world.

The box set comprises seven volumes over 33 discs, including CDs, DVDs, Blu-Rays and vinyl records, plus memorabilia including photos, posters and tour programmes. It contains early non-album singles plus unreleased studio and live recordings. Although Volumes 1–6 have been available individually since 24 March 2017, Volume 7 – 1967–1972: Continu/ation, remains exclusive to the set. A two-CD compilation, The Early Years 1967–1972: Cre/ation, was also released.

Due to an error, a CD edition of Pink Floyd: Live at Pompeii was also included in the box set in place of the 2016 mix of Obscured by Clouds which was placed inside the set in a cardboard wallet at the last moment. The standalone edition of 1972: Obfusc/ation contains both CDs as standard.

In 2019, a number of Blu-ray discs in the set began to fail due to manufacturing defects. Warner Music and Pink Floyd announced a recall programme on 1 October 2019, which ran until 1 January 2020.

== Contents ==
=== Volume 1: 1965–1967: Cambridge St/ation ===
Track listing:

Disc one (CD) – studio recordings from 1965 to 1967

1965 recordings:

1. "Lucy Leave" – 2:57
2. "Double O Bo" – 2:57
3. "Remember Me" – 2:46
4. "Walk with Me Sydney" – 3:11
5. "Butterfly" – 3:00
6. "I'm a King Bee" – 3:13

1966–1967 recordings:

7. "Arnold Layne" – 2:57
8. "See Emily Play" – 2:55
9. "Apples and Oranges" – 3:05
10. "Candy and a Currant Bun" – 2:45
11. "Paintbox" – 3:48
12. "Matilda Mother" (alternative version) (2010 mix) – 4:01
13. "Jugband Blues" (2010 mix) – 3:01
14. "In the Beechwoods" (instrumental) (2010 mix) – 4:43
15. "Vegetable Man" (2010 mix) – 2:32
16. "Scream Thy Last Scream" (2010 mix) – 4:43

Tracks 1–6 were recorded as The Tea Set around Christmas 1964.

Tracks 1–11 are mono.
Tracks 12–16 are stereo.
Tracks 1–6 saw a limited release in 2015, first time available on CD.
Tracks 7–8 & 12 were previously released on An Introduction to Syd Barrett (2010).
Tracks 13–16 are previously unreleased.

Disc two (CD) – Live in Stockholm and John Latham sessions

Live in Stockholm 1967:

1. "Introduction" – 0:25
2. "Reaction in G" – 7:18
3. "Matilda Mother" – 5:34
4. "Pow R. Toc H." – 11:56
5. "Scream Thy Last Scream" – 4:00
6. "Set the Controls for the Heart of the Sun" – 7:17
7. "See Emily Play" – 3:16
8. "Interstellar Overdrive" – 8:57

Live in Stockholm has barely audible vocals, rendering the performance almost completely instrumental. It was mastered for this release with the stereo channels out of phase and a silent gap mistakenly inserted. The original recording is ambient, so it is of lower fidelity than a typical live release.

John Latham studio recordings 1967:

9. "John Latham Version 1" – 4:32
10. "John Latham Version 2" – 5:06
11. "John Latham Version 3" – 3:45
12. "John Latham Version 4" – 2:59
13. "John Latham Version 5" – 2:48
14. "John Latham Version 6" – 3:17
15. "John Latham Version 7" – 2:36
16. "John Latham Version 8" – 2:49
17. "John Latham Version 9" – 2:38

The John Latham recordings are of one long extended improvisational piece split across nine tracks, it is similar to that of the extended improvisation often played during the middle section of "Interstellar Overdrive". The piece was recorded as the soundtrack for Latham's 1962 film Speak.

Tracks 1–8 recorded live 10 September 1967 at Gyllene Cirkeln, Stockholm, Sweden.
Tracks 9–17 recorded at De Lane Lea Studios, London, 20 October 1967.

Disc three (DVD / Blu-ray)

- "Chapter 24" (Syd Barrett, Live, Cambridgeshire, 1966) / (Live at EMI Studios, London, 1967) – 3:40
- "Recording Interstellar Overdrive and Nick's Boogie" (London, 1967) – 6:36
- "Interstellar Overdrive: Scene – Underground" (London, 1967) – 4:15
- "Arnold Layne: promo video" (Wittering Beach, 1967) – 2:54
- "Pow R. Toc H. / Astronomy Domine: plus Syd Barrett & Roger Waters interview: BBC The Look Of The Week" (BBC Studios, London, 1967) – 9:22
- "The Scarecrow" (Pathé Pictorial, UK, 1967) – 2:05
- "Jugband Blues: London Line promo video" (London, 1967) – 2:58
- "Apples & Oranges: plus Dick Clark interview" (Live, Los Angeles, 1967) – 4:51
- "Instrumental Improvisation" (BBC Tomorrow's World, London, 1967) – 2:11
- "Instrumental Improvisation" (Live, London, 1967) – 4:32
- "See Emily Play: BBC Top Of The Pops" (Partially restored BBC Studios, London, 1967) – 2:55
- "The Scarecrow (outtakes)" (Pathé Pictorial, UK, 1967) – 2:07
- "Interstellar Overdrive" (Live, London, 1967) – 9:33

Personnel:

The Tea Set (The 1965 recordings):

- Syd Barrett – lead vocals, guitars
- Bob Klose – guitars
- Nick Mason – drums, percussion
- Roger Waters – bass, backing vocals, lead vocals on bridge of "Walk With Me Sydney"
- Richard Wright – keyboards

with:

- Juliette Gale – vocals on "Walk with Me Sydney"

Production:

- David Gilmour – supervision of 2010 mixes.

Pink Floyd (1966 onwards):

- Syd Barrett – lead vocals, guitars
- Nick Mason – drums, percussion, lead vocals on "Scream Thy Last Scream"
- Roger Waters – bass, backing vocals, lead vocals on "Set the Controls for the Heart of the Sun"
- Richard Wright – keyboards, backing vocals, lead vocals on "Matilda Mother" and "Paintbox"

=== Volume 2: 1968: Germin/ation ===
Track listing:

Disc one (CD) – studio recordings from 1968; BBC Sessions from 1968

Tracks taken from the "Point Me at the Sky" and "It Would Be So Nice" 7-inch singles:

1. "Point Me at the Sky" – 3:40
2. "It Would Be So Nice" – 3:46
3. "Julia Dream" – 2:34
4. "Careful with That Axe, Eugene" – 5:46

Capitol Studios, Los Angeles, 22 August 1968:

5. "Song 1" – 3:18
6. "Roger's Boogie" – 4:35

BBC Radio Session, 25 June 1968

7. "Murderotic Woman (Careful with That Axe, Eugene)" – 3:38
8. "The Massed Gadgets of Hercules (A Saucerful of Secrets)" – 7:18
9. "Let There Be More Light" – 4:32
10. "Julia Dream" – 2:50

BBC Radio Session, 20 December 1968

11. "Point Me at the Sky" – 4:25
12. "Embryo" – 3:13
13. "Interstellar Overdrive" – 9:37

Tracks 5–13 previously unreleased.

Disc two (DVD / Blu-ray)

- ‘Tienerklanken’, Brussels, Belgium, 19 February 1968
1. "Astronomy Domine" – 4:16
2. "The Scarecrow" – 2:03
3. "Corporal Clegg" – 2:56
4. "Paintbox" – 3:42
5. "Set the Controls for the Heart of the Sun" – 5:02
6. "See Emily Play" – 2:47
7. "Bike" – 1:49
- 'Vibrato', Brussels, Belgium, February 1968
8. "Apples and Oranges" – 3:03
- 'Bouton Rouge', Paris, France, 20 February 1968
9. "Astronomy Domine" – 2:45
10. "Flaming" – 2:43
11. "Set the Controls for the Heart of the Sun" – 4:31
12. "Let There Be More Light" – 3:45
- 'Discorama', Paris, France, 21 February 1968
13. "Paintbox" – 3:40
- 'The Sound of Change', London, UK, 26 March 1968
14. "Instrumental Improvisation" – 2:15
- 'All My Loving, London, UK, 28 March 1968
15. "Set the Controls for the Heart of the Sun" – 2:40
- 'Release-Rome Goes Pop', Rome, Italy, April 1968
16. "It Would Be So Nice (excerpt)" – 1:21
- 'Pop 68', Rome, Italy, 6 May 1968
17. "Interstellar Overdrive" – 6:59
- 'Tienerklanken – Kastival', Kasterlee, Belgium, 31 August 1968
18. "Astronomy Domine" – 3:26
19. "Roger Waters interview" – 0:22
- 'Samedi et Compagnie', Paris, France, 6 September 1968
20. "Let There Be More Light – 3:11
21. "Remember a Day" – 2:42
- 'A L'Affiche du Monde', London, UK, 1968
22. "Let There Be More Light" – 1:53
- 'Tous en Scène', Paris, France, 31 October 1968
23. "Let There Be More Light" – 3:44
24. "Flaming" – 3:03
- 'Surprise Partie', Paris, France, 1 November 1968
25. "Let There Be More Light" – 6:35
- Restored promo video, UK, 1968
26. "Point Me at the Sky" – 3:19

Personnel:

- Syd Barrett – guitars, lead vocals (appears on audio only of Tienerklanken’, Brussels, Belgium, 18–19 February 1968, as the band are miming to the original tracks)
- David Gilmour – guitars, lead vocals
- Nick Mason – drums, percussion, lead vocals on "Corporal Clegg"
- Roger Waters – bass, lead vocals on "Set the Controls for the Heart of the Sun" and "Roger's Boogie"
- Richard Wright – keyboards, backing vocals, lead vocals on "It Would Be So Nice", "Paintbox", "Let There Be More Light" and "Remember a Day"

with:

- John Peel – DJ for the BBC Sessions

=== Volume 3: 1969: Dramatis/ation ===
Track listing:

Disc one (CD) – More non-album tracks, BBC sessions and live in Amsterdam

More non-album tracks:

1. "Hollywood" (non-album track) – 1:21
2. "Theme" (beat version) (alternative version) – 5:38
3. "More Blues" (alternative version) – 3:49
  (despite being named "alternative version", it is actually an extended version of the track which appears on the album, More.)
4. "Seabirds" (non-album track) – 4:20
  (despite being named "Seabirds", this is not the song "Seabirds" which appears in the film but is actually an alternative form of "Quicksilver" from the More album.)

Other tracks:

5. "Embryo" – 4:43

BBC Radio Session, 12 May 1969:

6. "Grantchester Meadows" – 3:46
7. "Cymbaline" – 3:38
8. "The Narrow Way" – 4:48
9. "Green Is the Colour" – 3:21
10. "Careful with That Axe, Eugene" – 3:26

Live at the Paradiso, Amsterdam, 9 August 1969:

11. "Interstellar Overdrive" – 4:20
12. "Set the Controls for the Heart of the Sun" – 12:25
13. "Careful with That Axe, Eugene" – 10:09
14. "A Saucerful of Secrets" – 13:03

Tracks 1–4; 6–14 previously unreleased.
Track 5 previously released on the Harvest Records sampler LP, Picnic – A Breath of Fresh Air (1970) and on the compilation album, Works (1983).

Disc two (CD) – The Man and The Journey live Amsterdam, 17 September 1969

Part 1, The Man:

1. "Daybreak" ("Grantchester Meadows") – 8:14
2. "Work" – 4:12
3. "Afternoon" ("Biding My Time") – 6:39
4. "Doing It" – 3:54
5. "Sleeping" – 4:38
6. "Nightmare" ("Cymbaline") – 9:15
7. "Labyrinth" – 1:10

Part 2, The Journey:

1. "The Beginning" ("Green Is the Colour") – 3:25
2. "Beset by Creatures of the Deep" ("Careful with That Axe, Eugene") – 6:27
3. "The Narrow Way, Part 3" – 5:11
4. "The Pink Jungle" ("Pow R. Toc H.") – 4:56
5. "The Labyrinths of Auximines" – 3:20
6. "Footsteps" / "Doors" – 3:12
7. "Behold the Temple of Light" – 5:32
8. "The End of the Beginning (A Saucerful of Secrets)" – 6:31

Tracks 1–15 previously unreleased.

Disc three (DVD/Blu-ray)

- Forum Musiques, Paris, France, 22 January 1969
1. "Set the Controls for the Heart of the Sun" – 6:31
2. David Gilmour interview (in French) – 1:18
3. "A Saucerful of Secrets" – 12:03
- The Man and The Journey: Royal Festival Hall, London, rehearsal, 14 April 1969
4. "Afternoon" ("Biding My Time") – 4:22
5. "The Beginning" ("Green Is the Colour") – 2:55
6. "Cymbaline" – 2:59
7. "Beset by Creatures of the Deep" ("Careful with That Axe, Eugene") – 0:50
8. "The End of the Beginning" ("A Saucerful of Secrets") – 3:06
- Essencer Pop & Blues Festival, Essen, Germany, October 11, 1969
9. "Careful with That Axe, Eugene" – 6:19
10. "A Saucerful of Secrets" – 14:22
- Music Power & European Music Revolution, Festival Actuel Amougies Mont de L'Enclus, Belgium, 25 October 1969
11. "Green Is the Colour" – 4:36
12. "Careful with That Axe, Eugene" – 10:07
13. "Set the Controls for the Heart of the Sun" – 11:54
14. "Interstellar Overdrive" (with Frank Zappa) – 11:26

Personnel: Pink Floyd

- David Gilmour – lead vocals, guitars
- Nick Mason – drums, percussion
- Roger Waters – bass, lead vocals on "Afternoon", "Set the Controls for the Heart of the Sun" and "Grantchester Meadows", Spanish guitar on "Grantchester Meadows"
- Richard Wright – keyboards, backing vocals, trombone on "Afternoon"

with

- Frank Zappa – guitar on "Interstellar Overdrive"

=== Volume 4: 1970: Devi/ation ===
Track listing:

Disc one (CD)

1. "Atom Heart Mother" (Live at the Casino de Montreux, 21 November 1970) – 17:58

BBC Radio Session, 16 July 1970:

2. "Embryo" – 10:13
3. "Fat Old Sun" – 5:52
4. "Green Is the Colour" – 3:27
5. "Careful with That Axe, Eugene" – 8:25
6. "If" – 5:47
7. "Atom Heart Mother" (with choir, cello & brass ensemble) – 25:30

Tracks 1–7 previously unreleased.

Disc two (CD)

Previously unreleased tracks from the Zabriskie Point soundtrack recordings:

1. "On the Highway" – 1:16
2. "Auto Scene, Version 2" – 1:13
3. "Auto Scene, Version 3" – 1:31
4. "Aeroplane" – 2:18
5. "Explosion" ("Careful With That Axe, Eugene") – 5:47
6. "The Riot Scene" – 1:40
7. "Looking at Map" – 1:57
8. "Love Scene, Version 7" – 5:03
9. "Love Scene, Version 1" – 3:26
10. "Take Off" – 1:20
11. "Take Off, Version 2" – 1:12
12. "Love Scene, Version 2" – 1:56
13. "Love Scene (Take 1)" – 2:16
14. "Unknown Song (Take 1)" – 5:56
15. "Love Scene (Take 2)" – 6:40
16. "Crumbling Land (Take 1)" – 4:09

Other tracks:

17. "Atom Heart Mother" (Early studio version, band only) – 19:24

Tracks 1–17 previously unreleased.

Disc three (DVD)

- An Hour with Pink Floyd: KQED, San Francisco, US, 30 April 1970:
1. "Atom Heart Mother" – 17:37
2. "Cymbaline" – 8:38
3. "Grantchester Meadows" – 7:37
4. "Green Is the Colour" – 3:31
5. "Careful with That Axe, Eugene" – 9:09
6. "Set the Controls for the Heart of the Sun" – 12:37

Audio only:

- Atom Heart Mother album original 4.0 Quad mix 1970:
7. "Atom Heart Mother" – 23:42
8. "If" – 4:31
9. "Summer '68" – 5:29
10. "Fat Old Sun" – 5:24
11. "Alan's Psychedelic Breakfast" – 13:01

Disc four (DVD)

- Pop Deux Festival de St. Tropez, France, August 1970:
1. "Cymbaline" (sound check) – 3:54
2. "Atom Heart Mother" – 13:46
3. "Embryo" – 11:23
4. "Green Is the Colour" / "Careful with That Axe, Eugene" – 12:21
5. "Set the Controls for the Heart of the Sun" – 12:07
- Roland Petit Ballet, Paris, France, 5 December 1970:
7. "Instrumental Improvisations 1, 2, 3" – 3:28
8. "Embryo" – 2:39
- Blackhill's Garden Party, Hyde Park, London, UK, 18 July 1970:
9. "Atom Heart Mother" (with the Philip Jones Brass Ensemble/John Alldis Choir) – 21:15

Disc five (Blu-Ray)

- An Hour with Pink Floyd: KQED, San Francisco, US, 30 April 1970:
1. "Atom Heart Mother" – 17:37
2. "Cymbaline" – 8:38
3. "Grantchester Meadows" – 7:37
4. "Green Is the Colour" – 3:31
5. "Careful with That Axe, Eugene" – 9:09
6. "Set the Controls for the Heart of the Sun" – 12:37
- Pop Deux Festival de St. Tropez, France, 8 August 1970:
7. "Cymbaline" (sound check) – 3:54
8. "Atom Heart Mother" – 13:46
9. "Embryo" – 11:23
10. "Green Is the Colour" / "Careful with That Axe, Eugene" – 12:21
11. "Set the Controls for the Heart of the Sun" – 12:07
- Roland Petit Ballet, Paris, France, 5 December 1970:
13. "Instrumental Improvisations 1, 2, 3" – 3:28
14. "Embryo" – 2:39
- Blackhill's Garden Party, Hyde Park, London, UK, 18 July 1970:
15. "Atom Heart Mother" (with the Philip Jones Brass Ensemble/John Alldis Choir) – 21:15
  (Black and white video. Less than optimum video and audio quality. Included for its historic value.)

Audio only:

- Atom Heart Mother album original 4.0 Quad mix 1970:
16. "Atom Heart Mother" – 23:42
17. "If" – 4:31
18. "Summer '68" – 5:29
19. "Fat Old Sun" – 5:24
20. "Alan's Psychedelic Breakfast" – 13:01

After the release of The Early Years 1965–1972 footage was found of the band performing "Astronomy Domine" at KQED, but its discovery came too late for inclusion in the box. KQED were subsequently granted permission to publish the footage of "Astronomy Domine"

Personnel:

- David Gilmour – guitars, lead vocals
- Nick Mason – drums, percussion
- Roger Waters – bass, lead vocals on "Set the Controls for the Heart of the Sun", "If" and "Grantchester Meadows"
- Richard Wright – keyboards, harpsichord, backing vocals, lead vocals on "Summer '68", "Crumbling Land" (with Gilmour) and "Embryo" (with Gilmour)

with:

- EMI Pops Orchestra – brass and orchestral sections
- Hafliði Hallgrímsson – cello
- John Alldis Choir – vocals
- John Peel – DJ during the BBC Radio session
- Alan Styles – voice and sound effects on "Alan's Psychedelic Breakfast"

=== Volume 5: 1971: Reverber/ation ===
Track listing:

Disc one (CD)

1. "Nothing, Part 14" ("Echoes" work in progress) – 7:01
  (This is one of 24 demos known as "Nothing parts 1-24"; not all of which were used for the final song.)

BBC Radio Session, 30 September 1971:

2. "Fat Old Sun" – 15:33
3. "One of These Days" – 7:19
4. "Embryo" – 10:43
5. "Echoes" – 26:25

Disc two (DVD/Blu-Ray)

- 'Aspekte' feature – 9:51
1. "Interview + Atom Heart Mother (extracts)" Hamburg, Germany, 25 February 1971 Brass & Choir conducted by Geoffrey Mitchell
2. "A Saucerful of Secrets (extract)" Offenbach, Germany, 26 February 1971
- Cinq Grands Sur La Deux’, Abbaye de Royaumont, Asnierès-sur-Oise, France,15 June 1971 – 17:55
3. "Set the Controls for the Heart of the Sun"
4. "Cymbaline"
- ‘Musikforum Ossiachersee’, Ossiach, Austria,1 July 1971
5. "Atom Heart Mother (extract)" Brass & Choir conducted by Jeffrey Mitchel – 3.12
- 'Get to Know' Randwick Race Course, Sydney, Australia, 15 August 1971 – 6.23
6. "Careful with That Axe, Eugene"
7. Band interview
- '24 hours – Bootleg Records', London, UK, 1971
8. Documentary including Pink Floyd and manager Steve O'Rourke – 2:27
- 'Review', London, UK, 1971
9. Storm Thorgerson & Aubrey 'Po' Powell interviewed re: record cover design – 3:37
- Ian Emes animation created July 1972, Birmingham, UK
10. "One of These Days ('French Windows')" – 4:17
- 'Musikforum Ossiachersee', Ossiach, Austria, 1 July 1971
11. "Atom Heart Mother" (extract, in colour): – 5:10
- '71 Hakone Aphrodite Open Air Festival, Hakone, Japan, 6–7 August 1971
12. "Atom Heart Mother" – 15:11

Audio only:

13. "Echoes" original 4.0 Quad mix 1971 – 23:35

This Blu-ray also includes hidden Stereo and 5.1 mixes of the album Meddle. These mixes are only to be found on the content of the disc itself via computer and are not linked in the menu or mentioned anywhere in the credits. Additionally, these two mixes are only included on the Blu-ray of the The Early Years 1965–1972 box set. The standalone release has both mixes removed.

Personnel:

- David Gilmour – guitars, lead vocals, bass on "One of These Days (French Windows)"
- Nick Mason – drums, percussion
- Roger Waters – bass
- Richard Wright – keyboards, backing vocals, lead vocals on "Embryo" (with Gilmour) and "Echoes" (with Gilmour)

with:

- John Peel – DJ for BBC Session

=== Volume 6: 1972: Obfusc/ation ===
Track listing:

Disc one (CD)

Obscured by Clouds 2016 mix

1. "Obscured by Clouds" – 3:03
2. "When You're In" – 2:31
3. "Burning Bridges" – 3:30
4. "The Gold It's in the..." – 3:07
5. "Wot's... Uh the Deal?" – 5:09
6. "Mudmen" – 4:18
7. "Childhood's End" – 4:33
8. "Free Four" – 4:16
9. "Stay" – 4:06
10. "Absolutely Curtains" – 5:52

This CD was accidentally replaced by the Live at Pompeii stereo CD before shipping. This disc actually comes packaged outside the set in a separate white slipcase, on the reverse of which it says "Replacement CD disc for Obfusc/ation [...] (Stereo 2016 mix of Pink Floyd 'Live at Pompeii' CD supplied in error)" The standalone edition of this volume, however, contains Live at Pompeii as CD2 of the set.

Disc Two (DVD/Blu-Ray)

- Recording Obscured by Clouds, Château d’Hérouville, France, 23–29 February 1972
1. "Wot’s...Uh the Deal?": with recording session photos – 5:04
2. "Pop Deux": documentary – recording Obscured by Clouds + David Gilmour and Roger Waters interview – 7:14
- Brighton Dome, UK, 29 June 1972 – 16:44
3. "Set the Controls for the Heart of the Sun"
4. "Careful with That Axe, Eugene"
- Roland Petit Pink Floyd Ballet, France, news reports 1972–73
5. "Actualités Méditerranée", Marseille, 22 November 1972 – 3:29
6. "JT Nuit – Les Pink Floyd", Marseille, 26 November 1972 – 3:04
7. "JT 20^{h} – Pink Floyd", Paris, 12 January 1973 – 3:01
8. "Journal de Paris – Les Pink Floyd", Paris, 12 January 1973 – 5:03
- Concert set up news report – France, 29 November 1972
9. Poitiers – Autour du passage des Pink Floyd – 4:27
- Pink Floyd: Live at Pompeii (2016 5.1 audio mix)
10. "Careful with That Axe, Eugene" – 6:40
11. "A Saucerful of Secrets" – 10:09
12. "One of These Days" – 5:58
13. "Set the Controls for the Heart of the Sun" – 10:24
14. "Echoes" – 26:10

This version of Live at Pompeii is notable for excluding "Mademoiselle Nobs", an instrumental version of the song "Seamus" found on the original film and the 2003 DVD, and for bridging "Echoes" which was originally performed in two parts for the film.

Personnel:

- David Gilmour – guitars, lead vocals
- Nick Mason – drums, percussion, vocal phrase on "One of These Days"
- Roger Waters – bass, lead vocals on "Free Four" and "Set the Controls...", cymbals on "A Saucerful of Secrets", gong on "A Saucerful..." and "Set the Controls..."
- Richard Wright – keyboards, lead vocals on "Echoes" (with Gilmour), "Burning Bridges" (with Gilmour) and "Stay"

=== Volume 7: 1967–1972: Continu/ation ===
This volume, unlike Volumes 1–6, is exclusive to the box set and is not yet available separately as a standalone edition. This volume is notable for containing three feature-length films: The Committee, More and La Vallée and, despite the volume's subtitle, a live recording of "Echoes" from 1974.

Track listing:

Disc one (CD)

BBC Radio Session, 25 September 1967:

1. "Flaming"‡ – 2:42
2. "The Scarecrow"‡ – 1:59
3. "The Gnome"‡ – 2:08
4. "Matilda Mother"‡ – 3:20
5. "Reaction in G"‡ – 0:34
6. "Set the Controls for the Heart of the Sun"‡ – 3:19

BBC Radio Session, 20 December 1967:

7. "Scream Thy Last Scream"‡ – 3:35
8. "Vegetable Man"‡ – 3:07
9. "Pow R. Toc H."‡ – 2:45
10. "Jugband Blues"‡ – 3:50

Other tracks:

11. "Baby Blue Shuffle in D Major" (BBC Radio Session, 2 December 1968) – 3:58
12. "Blues" (BBC Radio Session, 30 September 1971 – mistakenly listed as 2 December 1968 on box set) – 4:59
13. "US Radio advertisement for Ummagumma" – 0:22
14. "Music from The Committee No. 1" – 1:06
15. "Music from The Committee No. 2" – 3:25
16. "Moonhead" (live on BBC TV Moon landing broadcast 1969) – 7:16
17. "Echoes" (Live at Wembley 1974) – 24:10

Disc two (DVD/Blu-Ray)

1. Spare 2 seconds chapter
- Hampstead Heath and St Michael's Church, Highgate, London, UK, March 1967
2. "Arnold Layne (Alternative version)"‡ – 2:56
- "P1–P wie Petersilie" Stuttgart, Germany, 22 July 1969 – 16:52
3. "Corporal Clegg"
4. Band interview
5. "A Saucerful of Secrets"
- ‘Bath Festival of Blues & Progressive Music’, Shepton Mallet, UK, 27 June 1970
6. "Atom Heart Mother" – 3:46
- "Kralingen Music Festival" Rotterdam, The Netherlands, 28 June 1970 – 10:16
7. "Set the Controls for the Heart of the Sun"
8. "A Saucerful of Secrets"
- "The Amsterdam Rock Circus" Amsterdam, the Netherlands, 22 May 1972 – 35:41
9. "Atom Heart Mother"
10. "Careful with That Axe, Eugene"
11. "A Saucerful of Secrets"
- The Committee (feature film) – 55:18

Disc three (DVD/Blu-Ray)

- More (feature film) – 1:56:00
- La Vallée (feature film) – 1:45:00

Personnel: Pink Floyd

- Syd Barrett – guitars, vocals (only ‡)
- David Gilmour – guitars, vocals (except ‡ and track 13)
- Nick Mason – drums, percussion, vocals on "Scream Thy Last Scream" (except track 13)
- Roger Waters – bass, vocals (except track 13)
- Richard Wright – keyboards, vocals (except track 13)

with

- Dick Parry – saxophone on "Echoes"
- Venetta Fields – backing vocals on "Echoes"
- Carlena Williams – backing vocals on "Echoes"

=== Bonus CD: Live at Pompeii ===
On 5 November 2016 Pink Floyd announced, via their official Facebook page, that an extra CD would now be included in the set – Live at Pompeii. The Pompeii performance had never been officially released on CD before. The Live at Pompeii CD was accidentally included in the 1972: Obfusc/ation set instead of the 2016 mix of the album Obscured by Clouds. Therefore, the 2016 Obscured by Clouds CD was included separately in a white slipcase; on the front of which is written "Obscured by Clouds 2016 remix" and on the reverse: "Replacement CD disc for Obfusc/ation [...] (Stereo 2016 mix of Pink Floyd 'Live at Pompeii' CD supplied in error)". Warner Music has, to date, refused to provide replacement discs where copies of Obscured by Clouds were not included in customers' box sets (all Sony Music issues had the replacement CDs). When the 1972: Obfusc/ation was released as a standalone set in March 2017, the Live at Pompeii CD was included as Disc 2 of the set. The Live at Pompeii CD track listing is as follows:

1. "Careful with That Axe, Eugene" – 6:45
2. "Set the Controls for the Heart of the Sun" – 10:35
3. "One of These Days" – 5:50
4. "A Saucerful of Secrets" – 12:49
5. "Echoes" – 24:56
6. "Careful with That Axe, Eugene" (Alternative Version) – 6:06

=== Replica vinyl singles ===
Arnold Layne

1. "Arnold Layne"
2. "Candy and a Currant Bun"

Point Me at the Sky

1. "Point Me at the Sky"
2. "Careful With That Axe, Eugene"

It Would Be So Nice

1. "It Would Be So Nice
2. "Julia Dream"

See Emily Play

1. "See Emily Play"
2. "The Scarecrow"

Apples and Oranges

1. "Apples and Oranges"
2. "Paintbox"

== The Early Years 1967–1972: Cre/ation ==
The Early Years 1967–1972: Cre/ation

Compilation album by Pink Floyd
- Released: 11 November 2016
- Recorded: 1967–1972
- Genres: Progressive rock, psychedelic rock, space rock, experimental rock
- Length: 112 min
- Label: Pink Floyd Records
- Producers: Audio: Pink Floyd, Joe Boyd, Norman Smith, Jeff Griffin

Singles from Cre/ation: The Early Years 1967–1972
- 1. "Grantchester Meadows" Released: 31 August 2016; 2. "Childhood's End" Released: 6 October 2016; 3. "Green Is the Colour" Released: 26 October 2016; 4. "Nothing, Pt. 14" Released: 9 November 2016

Professional ratings
Review scores
Source	Rating
AllMusic	5/5 stars

The Early Years 1967–1972: Cre/ation is a 2-disc highlights compilation of the box set The Early Years 1965–1972 which was released on 11 November 2016.

=== Track listing ===
Disc one

1. "Arnold Layne" – 2:57
2. "See Emily Play" – 2:55
3. "Matilda Mother" (alternate version, 2010 mix) – 3:58
4. "Jugband Blues" (2010 mix) – 3:02
5. "Paintbox" – 3:47
6. "Flaming" (BBC Radio session, 25 September 1967) – 2:42
7. "In the Beechwoods" (2010 mix) – 4:43
8. "Point Me at the Sky" – 3:41
9. "Careful with That Axe, Eugene" – 5:48
10. "Embryo" (from Harvest Records sampler Picnic) – 4:42
11. US Radio advertisement for Ummagumma – 0:22
12. "Grantchester Meadows" (BBC Radio session, 12 May 1969) – 3:46
13. "Cymbaline" (BBC Radio session, 12 May 1969) – 3:39
14. "Interstellar Overdrive" (Live at the Paradiso, Amsterdam, 9 August 1969) – 4:24
15. "Green Is the Colour" (BBC Radio session, 12 May 1969) – 3:21
16. "Careful with That Axe, Eugene" (BBC Radio session, 12 May 1969) – 3:28

Disc two

1. "On the Highway" (Zabriskie Point sessions) – 1:17
2. "Auto Scene Version 2" (Zabriskie Point sessions) – 1:13
3. "The Riot Scene" (Zabriskie Point sessions) – 1:40
4. "Looking at Map" (Zabriskie Point sessions) – 1:56
5. "Take Off" (Zabriskie Point sessions) – 1:19
6. "Embryo" (BBC Radio session, 16 July 1970) – 10:13
7. "Atom Heart Mother" (Live at the Casino de Montreux, 21 November 1970) – 18:01
8. "Nothing, Part 14" ("Echoes" work in progress) – 7:01
9. "Childhood's End" (2016 mix) – 4:33
10. "Free Four" (2016 mix) – 4:16
11. "Stay" (2016 mix) – 4:08
- Disc 1, tracks 1–5 & 7 are taken from 1965–1967: Cambridge St/ation.
- Disc 1, tracks 6 and 11 are taken from 1967–1972: Continu/ation.
- Disc 1, tracks 8–9 are taken from 1968: Germin/ation.
- Disc 1, tracks 10 & 12–16 are taken from 1969: Dramatis/ation.
- Disc 2, tracks 1–7 are taken from 1970: Devi/ation.
- Disc 2, track 8 is taken from 1971: Reverber/ation.
- Disc 2, tracks 9–11 are taken from 1972: Obfusc/ation.

=== Personnel ===
- Syd Barrett – vocals, guitars (only disc 1, tracks 1–7)
- David Gilmour – vocals, guitars (except disc 1, tracks 1–7, 11)
- Nick Mason – drums, percussion (except disc 1, track 11)
- Roger Waters – vocals, bass (except disc 1, tracks 11–12), acoustic guitar (only disc 1, track 12)
- Richard Wright – vocals, keyboards (except disc 1, track 11)

=== Charts ===
==== Weekly charts ====
The Early Years 1967–1972: Cre/ation

Chart (2016)	Peak position
Australian Albums (ARIA)	47
Austrian Albums (Ö3 Austria)	29
Belgian Albums (Ultratop Flanders)	21
Belgian Albums (Ultratop Wallonia)	20
Canadian Albums (Billboard)	38
Czech Albums (ČNS IFPI)	27
Dutch Albums (Album Top 100)	22
French Albums (SNEP)	21
German Albums (Offizielle Top 100)	20
Hungarian Albums (MAHASZ)	39
Irish Albums (IRMA)	67
Italian Albums (FIMI)	13
New Zealand Heatseekers Albums (RMNZ)	3
Polish Albums (ZPAV)	35
Portuguese Albums (AFP)	11
Scottish Albums (Official Charts)	15
Spanish Albums (PROMUSICAE)	58
Swiss Albums (Schweizer Hitparade)	24
UK Albums (Official Charts)	19
US Billboard 200	103
US Top Rock Albums (Billboard)	13

==== Year-end charts ====
Chart (2016)	Position
Belgian Albums (Ultratop Wallonia)	174

== Credits ==
- Aubrey Powell of Hipgnosis – creative director.
- Lana Topham – curator, producer and archivist for The Early Years films.
- Pentagram – package design.
- John Whiteley – 1960s psychedelic paper design.
- Peter Curzon of StormStudios – photo memorabilia curation and design, assisted by Lee Baker; artwork for 7-inch vinyls.
- Glenn Povey – additional memorabilia.
- Tracey Kraft of Pink Floyd Archive – photo stills.
- Andy Jackson of Tube Mastering – audio mastering CD and 7-inch vinyl.
- Ray Staff of Air Studios – audio mastering 7-inch vinyl.
- Peter Sykes – The Committee director.
- Barbet Schroeder – More and La Vallée director.

== Reception ==
Professional ratings
Aggregate scores
Source	Rating
Metacritic	97/100
Review scores
Source	Rating
Allmusic	5/5 stars
Classic Rock	4/5 stars
The Guardian	4/5 stars
The Irish Times	3/5 stars
Louder Sound	4/5 stars
Mojo	5/5 stars
Pitchfork	8.8/10
Record Collector	5/5 stars
RTÉ.ie	10/10
Uncut	10/10

The Early Years 1965–1972 has a score of a 97 out of 100 on Metacritic based on 8 reviews, indicating "universal acclaim". Stephen Thomas Erlewine of Allmusic called it "a deep, multi-tiered portrait of the years when Pink Floyd were fumbling around trying to find their voice". He praised the tracks "Vegetable Man", "In the Beechwoods", the band's collaboration with John Latham, the soundtracks they recorded for The Committee and Zabriskie Point, and "Moonhead". "Because so much of this music is raw – it's alternately live, unfinished, and improvisatory – the box underscores how Pink Floyd were an underground band right up until Dark Side", he concludes. "Decades later, these recordings still feel boundless: this was music made without a destination in mind and the journey remains thrilling."

Daryl Easlea of Record Collector described the box-set as "the sonic equivalent to background reading and extensive footnotes for their remarkable body of recorded work". He describes the band's earliest material from 1965 as "showcasing what a fabulous beat band they initially were. A quick grin is not something you associate with the Floyd, but these five early tracks from 1965 are tremendous fun." He also praised the John Peel concert from 1971 as being "a real treat, with a 14-minute-long Fat Old Sun displaying their improvisational might. A lengthy capture of Embryo demonstrates their glacial grandeur at its finest." He also singles out "the 20 December 1967 BBC session, just a month before Barrett’s departure" as "a revelation".

Pitchfork named awarded the box set the week's "Best New Reissue". Jesse Jarnow wrote that "[a]s career periods go, the seven years of Pink Floyd’s Early Years don’t exactly match other intense eras of classic rock creativity, like Bob Dylan from 1961 to 1968 or the Beatles from 1962 to 1969 [...] this set illustrates something about both Pink Floyd’s own path and the rewards of resilience." He writes that "in the modern age of oversized vault-clearing and copyright-protecting box sets, there is something resoundingly human about The Early Years, which only makes the achievements more extraordinary".

Alexis Petridis of The Guardian described the compilation as an "exhaustive document" that contains "some tantalising glimpses of the different paths they could have taken". He praised some of the material (noting, for example, the influence their "cyclical, hypnotic repetitions and weird, very un-rock-like atmosphere" of early improvisations like "Set the Controls for the Heart of the Sun" had on "nascent" krautrock bands as well as their role in the development of space rock) but criticized the superfluousness of some of it (pointing out that the box-set contains "15 versions of Careful With That Axe, Eugene" and writing: "there comes a point where you suspect that even the most ardent fan of Set the Controls for the Heart of the Sun [...] will heave a fairly weary sigh as its three-note bassline starts up for the umpteenth time").

=== Accolades ===
Publication	Country	Accolade	Rank
Medium	US	Best 100 (Or So) Reissues Of 2016	1
Paste	US	The 10 Best Box Sets of 2016	7
Rolling Stone	US	10 Best Reissues of 2016	1
Uncut	UK	The Best Reissue Albums Of 2016 – The Uncut Top 30	26
Allmusic	US	Favorite Reissues and Compilations	-
Toronto Sun	Canada	2016's most essential music box sets: Pink Floyd, Dylan, Led Zep and more	1
Metacritic	US	Best-Reviewed Reissues, Box Sets, And Compilations Of 2016	1
