= Atom Heart Mother (suite) =

Rock instrumental by Pink Floyd and Ron Geesin

Instrumental by Pink Floyd

from the album Atom Heart Mother
- Released: 2 October 1970 (UK); 10 October 1970 (US)
- Recorded: 2–24 March, 13 June – 17 July 1970
- Studio: EMI, London
- Genre: Progressive rock; experimental rock; symphonic rock
- Length: 23:44
- Label: Harvest
- Songwriters: David Gilmour; Richard Wright; Roger Waters; Nick Mason; Ron Geesin
- Producers: Pink Floyd; Norman Smith (executive producer)

Official audio
- "Atom Heart Mother" on YouTube

"Atom Heart Mother" is a six-part instrumental suite by the progressive rock band Pink Floyd, composed by all members of the band and Ron Geesin. It appeared on the Atom Heart Mother album in 1970, taking up the first side of the original vinyl record. At 23:44, it is Pink Floyd's longest uncut piece in their catalogue. (Note: Although "Shine On You Crazy Diamond" is longer, it is split between the two sides of their ninth studio album Wish You Were Here. An uncut version was included in the 50th anniversary re-release of the album at 25:38 in length.) Pink Floyd performed it live between 1970 and 1972, occasionally with a brass section and choir in 1970–71.

== Recording and composition ==
Recording began with the drum and bass parts, recorded in one take for the entire suite, resulting in an inconsistent tempo throughout the song. Roger Waters and Nick Mason had to play for twenty-three minutes straight. When Waters heard David Gilmour playing the guitar parts for this track, he said that he thought it sounded like the theme song from the western film The Magnificent Seven.

The track was one of only two Pink Floyd compositions credited as being co-written by someone outside the band prior to 1987 (not counting Clare Torry's contribution to "The Great Gig in the Sky", for which she was retroactively credited, following a settlement with Pink Floyd). The other song is "The Trial", from the 1979 album The Wall, co-written by Roger Waters and producer Bob Ezrin.

== Kubrick's A Clockwork Orange ==
Stanley Kubrick aspired to use "Atom Heart Mother" in his 1971 film A Clockwork Orange; however, the band refused permission. Kubrick did, however, include the album cover in the film. It can be seen on a shelf in the music shop scene alongside the Beatles' album Magical Mystery Tour. Years later, Kubrick refused Roger Waters permission to use audio samples from his film 2001: A Space Odyssey on Waters' solo album Amused to Death.

== Live ==
The band were initially enthusiastic about performing the suite. An early performance was taped for the San Francisco television station KQED, featuring just the band, on 28 April 1970. Two major performances were at the Bath Festival of Blues and Progressive Music on 27 June and the "Blackhill's Garden Party" in Hyde Park, London on 18 July, convened by the band's erstwhile management partnership, Blackhill Enterprises. On both occasions the band were accompanied by the John Alldis Choir and the Philip Jones Brass Ensemble. Later, the band took a full brass section and the Geoffrey Mitchell Choir, both conducted by Mitchell, on tour just for the purpose of performing this piece. However, this caused the tour to lose money, and the band found problems with the hired musicians, which changed from gig to gig as they simply took who was available, which, combined with lack of rehearsal and problems miking up the whole ensemble, made a full live performance more problematic. Reflecting on this, Gilmour said "some of the brass players have been really hopeless". According to Mason, the band arrived at one gig in Aachen, Germany, only to discover they had left the sheet music behind, forcing tour manager Tony Howard to go back to London and get it.

Filmed extracts from two of these performances are included in the Pink Floyd box set The Early Years 1965–1972.

A later arrangement without brass or choir, and pared down from 25 minutes to fifteen by omitting the "collage" sections and closing reprise of the main theme, remained in their live repertoire into 1972. The first live performance of the Dark Side of the Moon suite in Brighton was abandoned partway through; after a break, the band played Atom Heart Mother instead. Pink Floyd's last live performance of the suite took place on 22 May 1972 at the Olympisch Stadion, Amsterdam, Netherlands.

The number was performed live on 14 and 15 June 2008 by The Canticum Choir, conducted by Mark Forkgen, with the Royal College of Music on brass, Caroline Dale on cello, Ron Geesin on piano, Andrea Beghi on drums, Nadir Morelli on bass, Federico Maremmi on guitar and Emanuele Borgi on the Hammond organ. David Gilmour joined the ensemble on the second night at Cadogan Hall playing his black Stratocaster for most of the track and lap steel guitar for the slide parts. The suite had been previously performed by a number of ensembles including the Conservatoire national supérieur de musique et de danse de Paris (CNSMDP) in March 2003 and the Seamus Band on 14 October 2005. Nick Mason's Saucerful of Secrets performed a section of the track on their 2018, 2019, 2022 and 2024 tours. A recording is included on their 2020 live album Live at the Roundhouse.

== Sections ==
Father's Shout (0:00–2:50) (Gilmour, Geesin)

This section opens with a low Hammond organ note and a brass section. The band then enters with the brass continuing, before the music calms down. Being reprised several times, this part may be seen as the main theme of the piece. This section, as well as the next two sections, are in the key of E minor.

Breast Milky (2:50–5:23) (Wright, Gilmour, Geesin, Mason)

A cello solo begins, accompanied by bass guitar and organ, with drums joining later. This is followed by a double-tracked slide guitar solo. The choir joins in at the end of this section.

Mother Fore (5:23–10:13) (Gilmour, Wright, Geesin)

Picking up directly after the last note of the guitar solo, the organ (with quiet bass and drums) takes over for a five-minute ostinato sequence, playing chords based on E-minor, gradually joined by soprano voices and then a choir. The voices deliver a crescendo, then die down.

Funky Dung (10:13–15:28) (Wright, Waters, Gilmour)

Introduced by a key change from E minor to G minor, this section features a simple band jam session. It contains a second, much bluesier guitar solo. With the introduction of a sustained note on a Farfisa organ, and grand piano, this section changes into a chanting section by the choir. The song then changes key back to E minor, building to a reprise of the main theme from "Father's Shout".

Mind Your Throats Please (15:28–17:58) (Wright, Gilmour, Mason, Waters)

This is the "noise" piece in the song, composed mainly of electronic noises. It is the only section on this album to feature the Mellotron; Wright uses the "3 Violins", "Brass" and "Flute" registration in order to create the dissonant chord clusters throughout this sound collage. A distorted voice says "Here is a loud announcement!" about 10 seconds before the next part starts. This section ends with a sound effect from the EMI archive of a steam train passing.

Remergence (17:58–23:44) (Gilmour, Geesin, Wright)

The last part begins with various instruments fading in and out, many of which are recognizable from earlier in the suite, and also features a Leslie speaker used on a piano, playing a similar melody with an effect that is used again in "Echoes". The same brass part that opens the song is heard over this section, culminating with Nick Mason's distorted voice shouting, "Silence in the studio!". This is followed by a reprise of the "Father's Shout" main theme, which then quietens into an abridged reprise of "Breast Milky" with the cello solo followed by a double layered guitar section reminiscent of the first slide solo. This leads into a final reprise of the "Father's Shout" theme with the entire brass section and choir, ending with a long resolve to E major from the choir and brass.

Alternative section divisions Vinyl and most CD editions of the album do not split the suite into physical tracks, and the matching of titles to sections as shown above is not universally accepted. One of the CD editions on EMI has different track divisions as shown below, but this has not been proven to be officially sanctioned, and other divisions have been proposed as well.

1. Father's Shout (00:00–05:20)
2. Breast Milky (5:21–10:09)
3. Mother Fore (10:10–15:26)
4. Funky Dung (15:27–17:44)
5. Mind Your Throats Please (17:45–19:49)
6. Remergence (19:49–23:39)

== Working titles ==
The working title for this piece changed a few times during the composing and recording process. When the first main theme was composed, David Gilmour called it "Theme from an Imaginary Western". The first working title for the six-part piece was "Epic", written in Ron Geesin's handwriting at the top of his original score. The work was introduced at the 27–28 June 1970 Bath Festival of Blues and Progressive Music as "The Amazing Pudding".

In July 1970 Ron Geesin pointed Roger Waters to the 16 July 1970 edition of the Evening Standard and told him that he would find the song title in the newspaper. Waters saw an article, on page 9, about a woman who had been fitted with a plutonium-powered pacemaker. The headline was "Atom Heart Mother Named".

== Release history ==
Audio

- Atom Heart Mother (1970)
- The Early Years 1965–1972 (2016):
  - Volume 4: Devi/ation - a live recording from the Montreux Casino (17:58); live BBC session with choir, cello and brass ensemble (25:30); an early studio take (19:24); quadrophonic mix of the album version (23:42)

Video

- The Early Years 1965–1972 (2016):
  - Volume 4: Devi/ation - Pop Deux Festival de St. Tropez (13:46); Blackhill's Garden Party, Hyde Park, London (21:15); An Hour with Pink Floyd: KQED (17:37)
  - Volume 5: Reverber/ation - 'Aspekte’ feature (9:51); 'Musikforum Ossiachersee’, Ossiach, Austria (3:12); 'Musikforum Ossiachersee’, Ossiach, Austria (5:10); Hakone Aphrodite Open Air Festival, Hakone, Japan (15:11)
  - Volume 7: 1967–1972: Continu/ation - ‘Bath Festival of Blues & Progressive Music’ (3:46); The "Amsterdam Rock Circus"

=== Other appearances ===
The live recording at the Montreux Casino (from The Early Years box set) also features on the shorter compilation The Early Years 1967–1972: Cre/ation.

An edited version of this song was considered for the album Echoes: The Best of Pink Floyd, but did not make the final track listing.

== Reception ==
While the band themselves have expressed negative opinions of the album, Irving Tan of Sputnik Music enjoyed the track. Tan described the suite as "an incredibly focused and well-written piece of lounge music – despite the band's claims to the contrary". Paul Stump, in his book The Music's All that Matters: A History of Progressive Rock, described the orchestration as "serviceable if not exemplary" and commended Pink Floyd's willingness to present key themes through solo orchestral instruments, but criticized elements such as Wright's reliance on repeated triplets for the chordal accompaniment and found the song as a whole showed a calculated and conventional approach to music which contrasted with the "haphazard innovation of new forms and voices" which Pink Floyd exhibited in their Syd Barrett-led era.

In 2011, PopMatters ranked "Atom Heart Mother" as the 23rd greatest progressive rock song of all time.

== Personnel ==
- David Gilmour – electric guitars, slide guitar; vocals on most live performances
- Roger Waters – bass guitar, tape edits
- Richard Wright – Hammond M-100 spinet organ, grand piano, Farfisa Compact Duo organ, Mellotron, Leslie-treated piano; vocals on most live performances
- Nick Mason – drums, percussion, distorted voice, tape edits

with:

- Ron Geesin – orchestration and co-composition
- Abbey Road Session Pops Orchestra – brass and orchestral sections
- John Alldis Choir – vocals
- Hafliði Hallgrímsson – cello (uncredited)
