= The Committee (film) =

1968 British film by Peter Sykes

- British poster
- Directed by: Peter Sykes
- Written by: Max Steuer; Peter Sykes
- Produced by: Max Steuer
- Starring: Paul Jones
- Cinematography: Ian Wilson
- Edited by: Peter Elliott
- Music by: Pink Floyd and Arthur Brown
- Release date: 26 September 1968
- Running time: 55 minutes
- Country: United Kingdom
- Language: English

The Committee is a 1968 British independent black-and-white film directed by Peter Sykes. It features original music by Pink Floyd as well as Arthur Brown's song "Nightmare".

== Plot ==
The movie begins with the unnamed male protagonist in a car with a driver. The driver attempts conversation with the protagonist before deciding to pull over as he believes the engine is malfunctioning. While he is inspecting the engine, the protagonist slams the bonnet down on his head several times, eventually decapitating him. The protagonist then sews the head back on after which the driver wakes up. The protagonist tells the driver to leave without him. A few years later the protagonist is called on to be part of The Committee, a group that allegedly keeps society functioning but really do very little. The Committee consists of 300 people who meet at a country estate where they swim, play tennis and sail boats during non-working hours; they host a dance with a live performance by Arthur Brown one evening. The protagonist becomes paranoid that the committee was called on account of him. He also encounters the driver of the car while at the estate but the man does not remember him.

The central character then discusses all of this with The Committee's director for the duration of the movie; this sequence and features most of the music Pink Floyd wrote for the film. At the end of The Committee's weekend retreat the protagonist meets a young woman while checking out and helps carry her bags to her car. She offers him a ride and they drive off. She asks him if he plays bridge, but he does not answer her and the film ends.

== Cast ==
- Arthur Brown as himself
- Jimmy Gardner as boss
- Paul Jones as central figure
- Tom Kempinski as victim
- Robert Langdon Lloyd as committee director (credited as Robert Lloyd)
- Pauline Munro as girl

== Soundtrack ==
The Committee

Soundtrack album by Pink Floyd
- Released: 2016
- Recorded: January 30 1968
- Genre: Psychedelic rock
- Length: 15:45 (total time of all excerpts)

Pink Floyd soundtracks chronology
San Francisco (1968)	The Committee (2016)	Tonite Lets All Make Love in London (1968)

1. The Committee (Part 1 backwards version) – 0:36
2. The Committee (Part 1) – 0:36
3. The Committee (Part 2) – 1:09
4. The Committee (Part 3) – 2:56
5. The Committee (Part 4) – 1:24
6. The Committee (Part 5) – 2:06
7. The Committee (Part 6) – 0:50
8. The Committee (Part 7) – 2:38
9. The Committee (Part 8) – 3:30

Titles taken from A Tree Full of Secrets bootleg. "The Committee (Part 1 backwards version)" is the original recording, which was reversed for the film. "The Committee (Part 7)" is an early recording of "Careful with That Axe, Eugene". The soundtrack is also on other bootlegs that are just called The Committee. It also features the Arthur Brown track "Prelude-Nightmare". It has been often misquoted that his song "Fire" is in the film. The confusion is possibly because he wears the same "flaming head-gear" that he used in the Fire footage, often seen on TV.

Producer of the film, Max Steuer, wanted Syd Barrett to provide the soundtrack. Through his contact with Peter Jenner, who had been his ex-colleague at the London School of Economics, a session was booked at Sound Technique Studios. On January 30, 1968, Barrett showed up to the studio, with an hour and a half of delay and without a guitar. He told Max Steuer and Peter Sykes, director of the film, to "get lost". When they returned a couple of hours later, Barrett had obtained a guitar and two session musicians had been hired. The session ended at midnight and produced a twenty-minute instrumental jam. Barrett insisted that this instrumental should be played backwards. The decision to use the Sound Technique studios proved too expensive and subsequent sessions were abandoned.

Roger Waters heard this problem, and offered to score the soundtrack along with the rest of the band. These sessions commenced in April and took place in the improvised basement of painter Michael Kidner. They spent four days working on the soundtrack, producing various instrumentals. Nick Mason would later describe these as “more of a collection of sound effects than music.”

== Release ==
The Committee has only been released once on DVD coupled with a CD Single with Paul Jones' title track "The Committee" in 2005, and later in remastered format on Blu-ray, as part of the 2016 Pink Floyd box set The Early Years 1965–1972.
