= Careful with That Axe, Eugene =

- 1968 Dutch single of "Point Me at the Sky"

Single by Pink Floyd
- A-side: "Point Me at the Sky"
- Released: 6 December 1968
- Recorded: 4 November 1968
- Studio: Abbey Road, London
- Genre: Acid rock; art rock; space rock
- Length: 5:45 (studio version); 8:49 (Ummagumma live version)
- Label: Columbia (EMI) (UK)
- Songwriters: David Gilmour; Roger Waters; Richard Wright; Nick Mason
- Producer: Norman Smith

Pink Floyd singles chronology
| "Let There Be More Light" (1968) | "Careful with That Axe, Eugene" (1968) | "The Nile Song" (1969) |

"Careful with That Axe, Eugene" is an instrumental piece by the English rock band Pink Floyd. It was recorded in November 1968 and released as the B-side to the single "Point Me at the Sky", and featured on the 1971 compilation album Relics. It was re-recorded for the 1970 film Zabriskie Point, retitled "Come In Number 51, Your Time Is Up".

The song became a concert favourite for Pink Floyd. Live recordings can be found on various releases, such as the live half of the double album Ummagumma and the film Pink Floyd: Live at Pompeii. It was performed sporadically after 1973, with a final one-off performance in 1977. Various versions, both live and studio recordings, were released as part of the 2016 box set The Early Years 1965–1972.

== Composition and recording ==
"Careful with That Axe, Eugene"
The song's only lyric, spoken, followed by the characteristic scream

Pink Floyd first attempted to record the piece in a Los Angeles studio on 22 August 1968, but this only resulted in a basic instrumental track, and the session was abandoned. The second attempt was made at Abbey Road Studios, in a single three-hour session on 4 November and produced by Norman Smith. It was created as part of a desire for Pink Floyd to move on from the early Syd Barrett-written songs and produce new music, adding a more advanced dynamic range compared to a typical pop song, though drummer Nick Mason later admitted this was just "quiet, loud, quiet, loud again". The title has no specific meaning; keyboardist Richard Wright explained "We often pick titles that have nothing really to do with the songs".

The music consists of an organ-based improvisation and an accompanying bass guitar playing just one tone (in this case, D) in octaves. It starts off quietly, before settling into a soft backbeat. This leads up to a segue into the only lyrics: the title of the song, whispered; followed by bassist Roger Waters' inhaled-scream. The song becomes much louder and more intense before gradually settling down again. In the heavier parts and later, quieter parts, guitarist David Gilmour sings scat vocals in unison with lead guitar lines. It was one of the first extended instrumentals recorded by the group, which would be a recurring theme over the next five years.

For the soundtrack to the film The Committee, recorded in early 1968, one piece has the band playing a long instrumental featuring a very similar riff. The song was re-recorded in December 1969 for the 1970 film Zabriskie Point, in a different key (E instead of D) and retitled "Come In Number 51, Your Time Is Up". Director Michelangelo Antonioni had been interested in working with Pink Floyd after hearing "Careful with That Axe, Eugene", and the re-recording was placed in the film's climax where the heroine imagines a villa in Arizona is exploding in slow motion. (Note: The title "Come in Number 51, Your Time Is Up" was a surrealistic line by comedian Spike Milligan shouted through a megaphone as part of his act in the BBC TV show Q5, and was derived from a command for boat livery renters to return because their rental period had expired.) A further remake was attempted during the Zabriskie Point sessions and was eventually released as "Explosion" on The Early Years 1965–1972 box, as part of the 1970: Devi/ation volume.

== Live performances ==
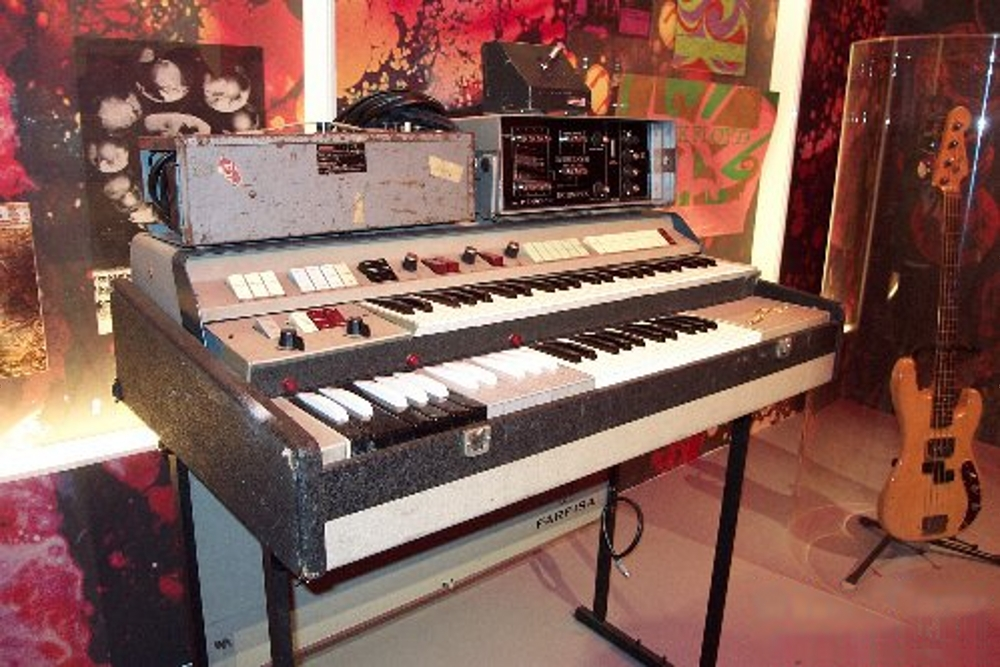
Richard Wright's Farfisa organ and Echorec, used for live performances of the song

Pink Floyd performed the piece frequently in concert from 1968 to 1973, and it became a live favourite. Concert performances gradually became significantly longer than the recorded version, often around ten minutes, and some performances feature different spoken lines by Waters.

An embryonic form was performed on 31 May 1968 at the Paradiso, Amsterdam, under the original title of "Keep Smiling People", which was filmed by NTS and broadcast on 5 July. Another version was recorded on 25 June 1968 at the BBC studio as "Mudererotic Woman" and broadcast on John Peel's Top Gear radio programme on 11 August, which Peel introduced as "Muderistic Woman". By November, it had become a regular part of the group's live show.

A version was recorded live on 2 May 1969 at the Manchester College of Commerce for the Ummagumma live album. The Ummagumma version is considerably longer than its studio counterpart and has the organ parts played on Wright's Farfisa Compact Duo rather than a Hammond. A further live version was recorded on 12 May for the BBC. For The Man and The Journey live suite, performed during mid-1969, "Careful with That Axe, Eugene" was played in the second half of the show, under the title "Beset by Creatures of the Deep". For a time, "Careful with That Axe, Eugene" was performed as the second part of a medley with "Green Is the Colour". A performance at Mont-de-l'Enclus, Belgium on 25 October 1969 was filmed and shown at select French cinemas during 1970, but not generally released. The song was played at a BBC Radio 1 concert in the BBC Paris Cinema on 16 July 1970 and at a free concert in Hyde Park two days later.

The band recorded two takes of "Careful with That Axe, Eugene" for the live film Pink Floyd: Live at Pompeii in October 1971. Contrary to the film's title, the song was recorded at Studio Europasinor, Paris. One version was used in the final film and another, titled "Careful with That Axe, Eugene (alternate version)" was released on CD as part of the Early Years box set. Both versions run for under seven minutes.

Footage also exists of the group performing the piece on the Australian TV programme GTK, filmed on 15 August 1971 at Randwick Racecourse, Sydney. It was broadcast with the live version from Ummagumma dubbed onto the footage. The performance at the Brighton Dome on 29 June 1972 was filmed by Peter Clifton for the film Sounds of the City 1964–1973. It was one of four Pink Floyd songs that the group played while accompanied with ballet choreographed by Roland Petit. The concerts ran in November 1972 at the Salle Valliers, Marseille, followed by a series of concerts at the Palais de Sports, Paris, in January and February 1973.

"Careful with That Axe, Eugene" was played as an encore for four shows during the group's French tour in June 1974. It was revived for a single performance as a final encore on 9 May 1977 at the Oakland Coliseum, which was the last time it was ever played.

== Releases ==
The original studio release was the B-side to the single "Point Me at the Sky", released on 6 December 1968. (Note: The lyrics to "Point Me at the Sky" also refer to a character called Eugene.) It was re-released on the compilation album Relics in July 1971 and on the box set Shine On in 1992 on the additional The Early Singles CD. The track was one of several to be considered for the band's 2001 "best of" album, Echoes: The Best of Pink Floyd, but it was ultimately omitted.

Before the release of The Early Years box set in 2016, only four versions had been officially released. The box set added a further nine live versions. The soundtrack to The Committee, featuring a prototypical version of the song, was played to press at the film's reception, but remained unreleased until The Early Years 1965–1972.

Subsequent releases, with a different recording to the studio version include:

Audio:

- Ummagumma, live recording at Manchester College of Commerce
- Zabriskie Point, a re-working for the film soundtrack, re-titled "Come in Number 51, Your Time Is Up"
- A Breath of Fresh Air – A Harvest Records Anthology 1969–1974, single version
- The Early Years 1965–1972 – various versions:
  - Volume 2 – 1968: Germin/ation, appears as the single version and a BBC session under the title "Murderotic Woman"
  - Volume 3 – 1969: Dramatis/ation, appears as live renditions from a BBC session "Live at the Paradiso" and as part of The Man and The Journey under the title "Beset by Creatures of the Deep"
  - Volume 4 – 1970: Devi/ation, appears as live renditions from a BBC session and as a re-working for the Zabriskie Point soundtrack under the title "Explosion"
  - Volume 6 – 1972: Obfusc/ation, appears on the Live at Pompeii CD. Two versions appear on this CD – the original (as seen in the film) and another titled "Careful with That Axe, Eugene (alternate version)".
  - Replica vinyls, single version appearing on a replica of the 1968 "Point Me at the Sky" 7" single.
- Pink Floyd at Pompeii MCMLXXII, Steven Wilson's 2025 remixes of the original live version and the alternate version appear on all audio releases for the re-released film.

Video:

- Pink Floyd: Live at Pompeii, appears in all versions of the concert film.
- The Dark Side of the Moon immersion box set, "Live in Brighton 1972"
- The Early Years 1965–1972 – various versions:
  - Volume 3 – 1969: Dramatis/ation, The Man and The Journey: Royal Festival Hall, London, rehearsal re-titled as "Beset by Creatures of the Deep"; Essencer Pop & Blues Festival and Music Power & European Music Revolution, Festival Actuel Amougies Mont de L'Enclus
  - Volume 4 – 1970: Devi/ation, An Hour with Pink Floyd: KQED and Pop Deux Festival de St. Tropez
  - Volume 5 – 1971: Reverber/ation, GTK Randwick Race Course
  - Volume 6 – 1972: Obfusc/ation, Pink Floyd: Live at Pompeii and Live at Brighton Dome
  - Volume 7 – 1967–1972: Continu/ation, The Amsterdam Rock Circus

== Personnel ==
Personnel per Andrew Wild, except where noted.

- Roger Waters – bass, vocals
- David Gilmour – guitar, vocals
- Richard Wright – Hammond organ, vibraphone (studio version); Farfisa organ (live version)
- Nick Mason – drums

== Cultural references ==
- The song features in the first episode of the 1973 British television documentary The Ascent of Man, when Jacob Bronowski narrates how mankind develops hunting techniques.
- The Llamasoft video game Revenge of the Mutant Camels (1984) features a level called "Careful with That Axe, Eugene".
- The album The Dark Side of the Moog VIII (1999) by Klaus Schulze and Pete Namlook is subtitled "Careful with the AKS, Peter".
- "Careful with That Axe, Eugene" is featured in the 2010 Howard Marks film Mr. Nice, along with Deep Purple's "Lazy" and John Lennon's "God".
- The 1986 Half Man Half Biscuit song "Time Flies By (When You're the Driver of a Train)" includes the line "Careful with That Spliff, Eugene".

== Sources ==
- Blake, Mark (2011) [2007]. Pigs Might Fly : The Inside Story of Pink Floyd. Arum Press. ISBN 978-1-781-31519-4. Archived from the original on 21 May 2021.
- Guesdon, Jean-Michel; Margotin, Philippe (2017). Pink Floyd All the Songs – The Story Behind Every Track. Running Press. ISBN 978-0-316-43923-7.
- Mabbett, Andy (2010). Pink Floyd: The Music and the Mystery. Omnibus Press. ISBN 978-0-857-12418-0.
- Mason, Nick (2004). Inside Out: A Personal History of Pink Floyd (New ed.). Widenfeld & Nicolson. ISBN 0-297-84387-7.
- Povey, Glenn (2007). Echoes : The Complete History of Pink Floyd (New ed.). Mind Head Publishing. ISBN 978-0-9554624-0-5.
- Manning, Toby (2006). The Rough Guide to Pink Floyd (1st ed.). London: Rough Guides. ISBN 1-84353-575-0.
- Reisch, George (2011). Pink Floyd and Philosophy: Careful with that Axiom, Eugene!. Open Court. ISBN 978-0-812-69745-2.
- Wild, Andrew (2017). Pink Floyd: Song by Song. Fonthill Media. ISBN 978-1-78155-599-6.
