= Nick Mason's Saucerful of Secrets =

English rock band

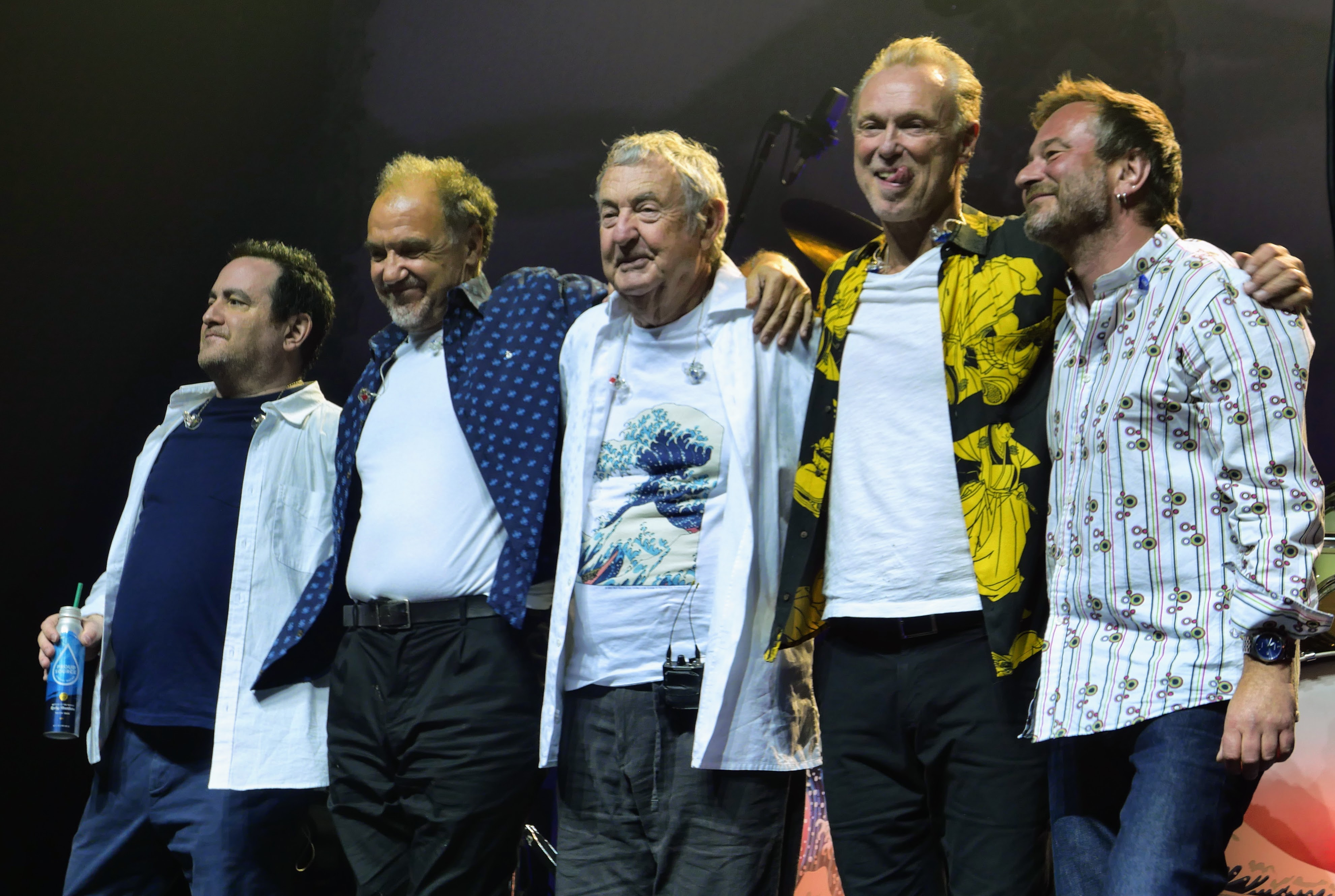
- From left: Lee Harris, Guy Pratt, Nick Mason, Gary Kemp, Dom Beken (2022)

Background information
- Origin: United Kingdom
- Genres: Psychedelic rock; progressive rock
- Years active: 2018–2024
- Label: Legacy
- Spinoff of: Pink Floyd
- Past members: Nick Mason; Dom Beken; Lee Harris; Gary Kemp; Guy Pratt
- Website: thesaucerfulofsecrets.com

Nick Mason's Saucerful of Secrets were an English rock band formed in 2018 to perform the early music of Pink Floyd. The band comprised the Pink Floyd drummer and co-founder Nick Mason, the bassist Guy Pratt, the guitarists Gary Kemp and Lee Harris, and the keyboardist Dom Beken. As many fans had discovered Pink Floyd with their eighth album, The Dark Side of the Moon (1973), Mason wanted to bring their earlier material to a wider audience.

The band made their debut in May 2018 at Dingwalls, London, before embarking on a European tour in September 2018 and a North American tour in 2019. A 2020 European tour was postponed due to the COVID-19 pandemic. In September 2020, the band released a live album and film, Live at the Roundhouse. They later toured Australia in 2023, and completed a final tour in 2024 before becoming inactive, with Mason cited as saying the rigours of touring in his eighties was a major factor.

== Formation ==
Pink Floyd, one of the most commercially successful and influential rock bands of all time, were formed in London in 1965 by Syd Barrett (guitar, lead vocals), Nick Mason (drums), Roger Waters (bass guitar, vocals), and Richard Wright (keyboards, vocals). In 1968, Barrett was replaced by David Gilmour. Waters left in 1985 and Wright died in 2008.

While Gilmour and Waters continued to perform Pink Floyd material in their solo shows, Mason worked on Pink Floyd reissues and compilations. After assisting with Pink Floyd: Their Mortal Remains, a 2017 museum exhibition about Pink Floyd, Mason said, "You end up feeling like you belong to English Heritage. Everything you talk about and do is something that happened forty years ago. It was actually beginning to make me feel a bit old."

In 2018, the guitarist Lee Harris, formerly of the Blockheads, approached the bassist and Pink Floyd collaborator Guy Pratt about forming a band with Mason to perform Pink Floyd's early psychedelic material, recorded while Barrett was the bandleader. They were joined by the vocalist and guitarist Gary Kemp of Spandau Ballet and the keyboardist Dom Beken, a collaborator of Wright. Pratt and Beken previously worked together in the electronic band the Transit Kings. Mason stressed that Kemp was not "taking the place" of Barrett, but that "it was to do with who had the enthusiasm for it, and Gary did". According to Mason, in early rehearsals, "The interesting thing was that it all sort of began to sound good straight away. That was mainly, I think, driven by their enthusiasm."

As many fans had discovered Pink Floyd with their successful 1973 album The Dark Side of the Moon, Mason wanted to bring their earlier material to a wider audience. He did not want to perform as a tribute act similar to the Australian Pink Floyd Show or perform shows similar to those by Waters and Gilmour, and the band wanted to "capture the spirit" of the music rather than recreate it. They received the blessings of Gilmour and Waters. The band took their name from the second Pink Floyd album, A Saucerful of Secrets (1968).

== Performances ==
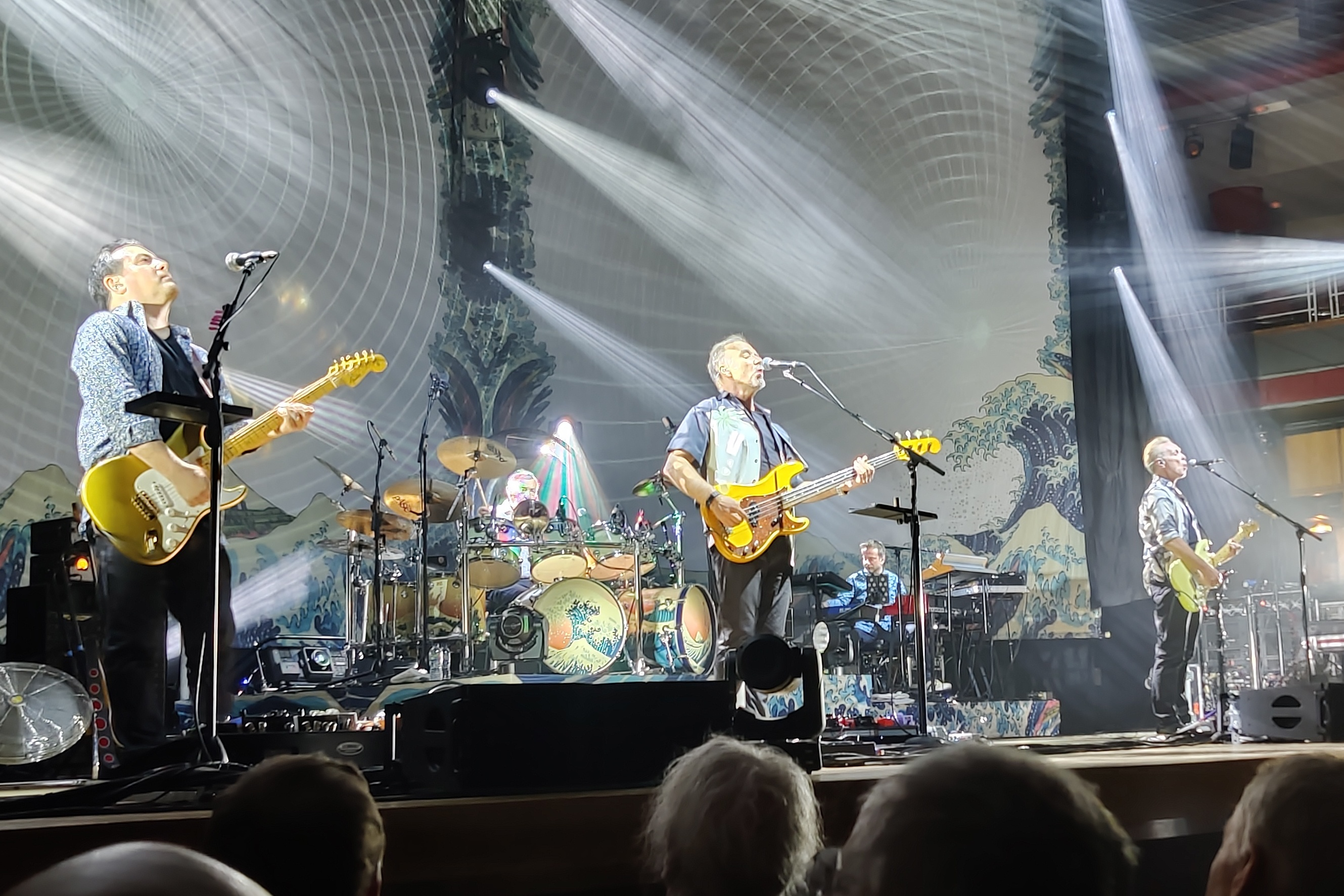
Symphony Hall, Birmingham, in 22 April 2022

Nick Mason's Saucerful of Secrets made their debut at a sold-out test show at Dingwalls, a 500-seat club in London, in May 2018. This was followed by three small shows at the Half Moon, Putney, a European tour in September 2018, and a North American tour in 2019. On 18 April 2019, Waters surprised the audience at the New York Beacon Theatre by joining the band to sing "Set the Controls for the Heart of the Sun". A 2020 European tour was postponed to April 2022 due to the COVID-19 pandemic. A second North American tour was postponed from January 2022 to September. They toured Australia in 2023.

== Releases ==
In September 2020, Nick Mason's Saucerful of Secrets released a live album and film, Live at the Roundhouse. They released a single featuring live versions of "See Emily Play" and "Vegetable Man" for Record Store Day 2020, and a live version of "Echoes" for Record Store Day 2025.

== Band members ==
- Nick Mason – drums, gong, bell, percussion
- Guy Pratt – vocals, bass, guitars, percussion
- Gary Kemp – vocals, guitars
- Lee Harris – guitars, backing vocals, percussion
- Dom Beken – keyboards, synthesisers, organ, piano, programming, harmonica, backing vocals
