= List of songs recorded by Syd Barrett =

Songs recorded by Syd Barrett

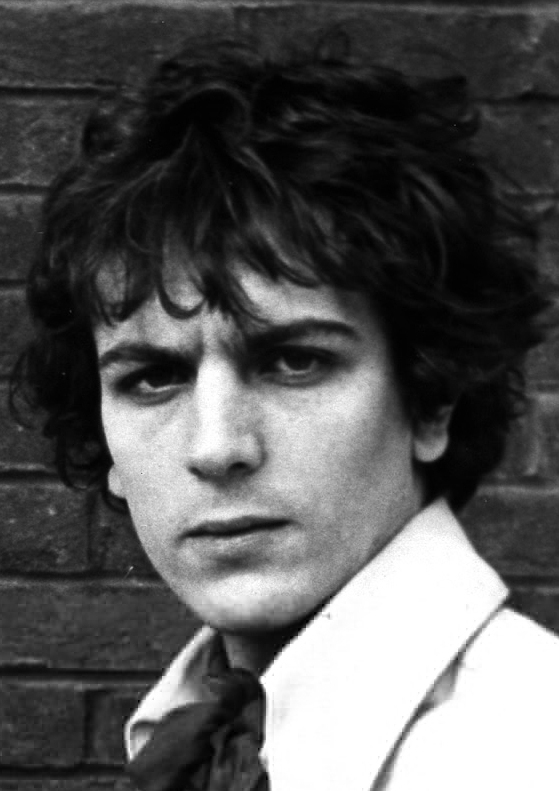
Barrett in 1967

Syd Barrett (1946–2006) was an English musician who recorded 37 songs during his short two-year solo career. One of the founding members of English rock band Pink Floyd, he was the dominant force in their early years, writing the majority of the material on their debut album, The Piper at the Gates of Dawn, contributing to their second, A Saucerful of Secrets, and recording several unreleased songs with them. As a result of Barrett's increasing mental illness, guitarist David Gilmour was hired as his possible replacement. When his condition worsened, he was officially excluded from Pink Floyd in April 1968. After his departure, Barrett recorded two solo albums, both released in 1970, until he left the music business in 1972.

Barrett returned to the studio in 1969 to begin work on his first solo album, The Madcap Laughs. His only single, "Octopus", was released in November 1969. Work on The Madcap Laughs proved difficult, going through five different producers, including former Pink Floyd bandmates David Gilmour and Roger Waters, and Barrett himself. Released in January 1970, the album received positive reviews from critics and enjoyed moderate commercial success, reaching number 40 in the UK charts. Two months later, Barrett began recording his second and final solo album, Barrett. Produced by Pink Floyd members David Gilmour and Richard Wright, the sessions were recorded more sporadically than The Madcap Laughs. Barrett was released in November 1970, but failed to chart; no singles were issued from the album. Two years later, Barrett signed a document ending his association with Pink Floyd and any financial interest in future recordings and left the music business. The Madcap Laughs and Barrett were paired and released as Syd Barrett in 1974. Barrett made almost no public appearances for the remainder of his life, and after suffering from Type 2 diabetes for several years, died at his home in Cambridge, England, in 2006 at age 60.

Several compilation albums of Barrett's songs were released before and after his death. The first of these, The Peel Session, an EP containing recordings Barrett performed for the John Peel Top Gear show on 24 February 1970, contains the unreleased song "Two of a Kind". In 1988, Barrett approved the release of Opel, a compilation that contained several unreleased songs and alternate takes of recordings from sessions for his two solo albums. The 1993 box set Crazy Diamond included his solo albums, Opel, and more alternate takes. The compilation album Wouldn't You Miss Me? followed suit, and contained Barrett's highly sought-after "Bob Dylan Blues". The song, along with "Terrapin" from The Madcap Laughs and "Maisie" from Barrett, reflect Barrett's early interest in the blues. The next greatest hits album, An Introduction to Syd Barrett, contained the previously unreleased twenty minute instrumental "Rhamadan" as a CD bonus track. In 2016, Barrett's Pink Floyd-era songs "In the Beechwoods", "Vegetable Man", and "Scream Thy Last Scream" were officially released on the Pink Floyd compilation box set The Early Years 1965–1972; they were meant to be released earlier but were blocked by Pink Floyd.

== List ==
All songs written by Syd Barrett, except where noted.

Key
†	Indicates compilation album track only

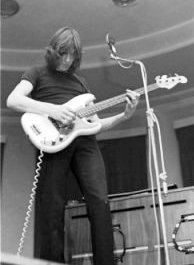
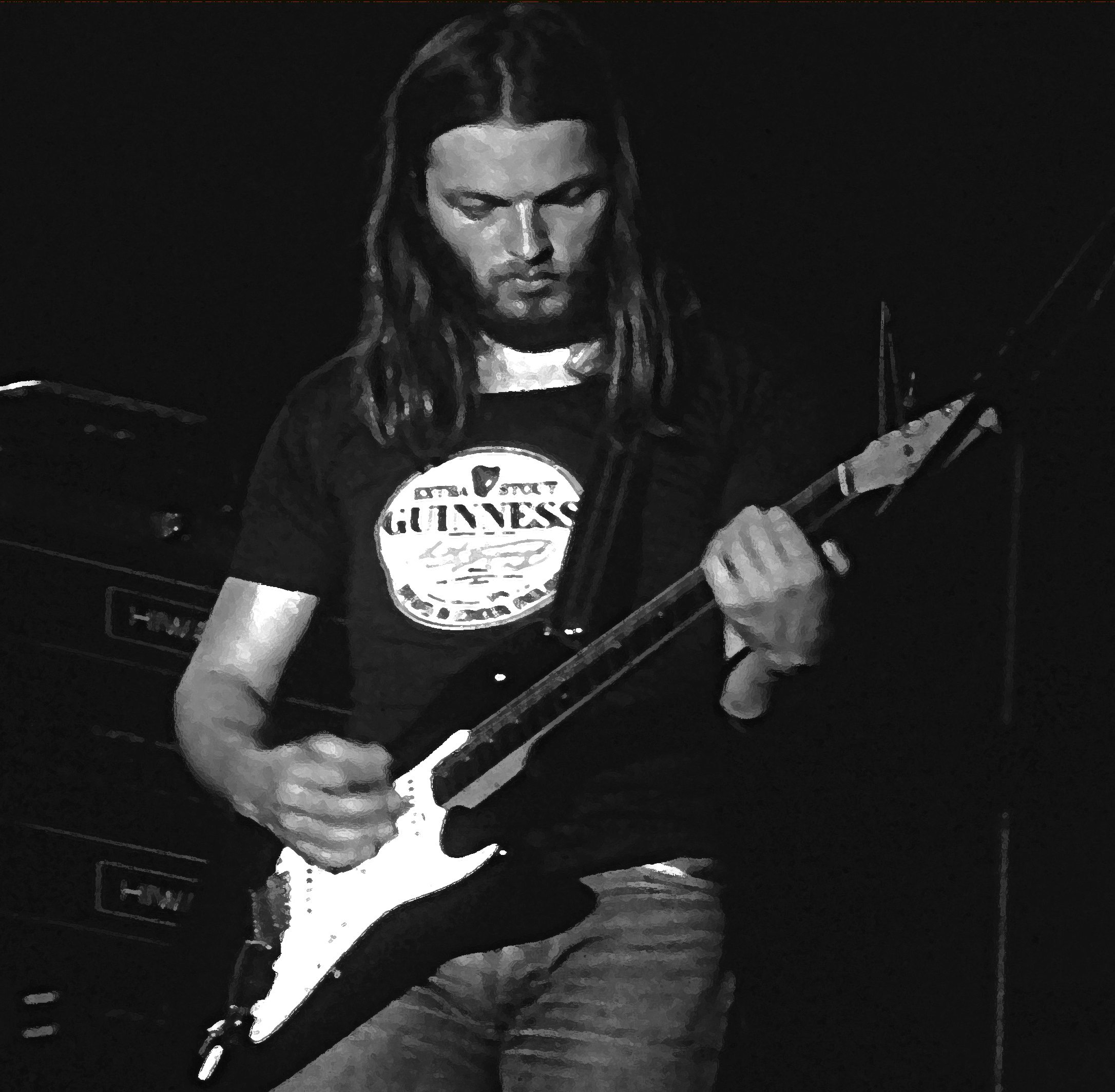
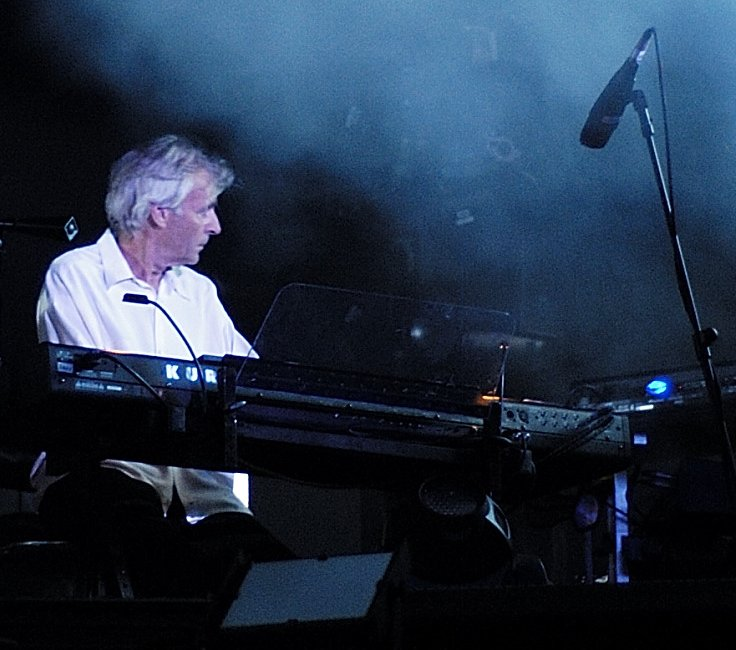
Pink Floyd members – from top to bottom, Roger Waters, David Gilmour, and Richard Wright – all contributed to Barrett's solo albums, The Madcap Laughs and Barrett.

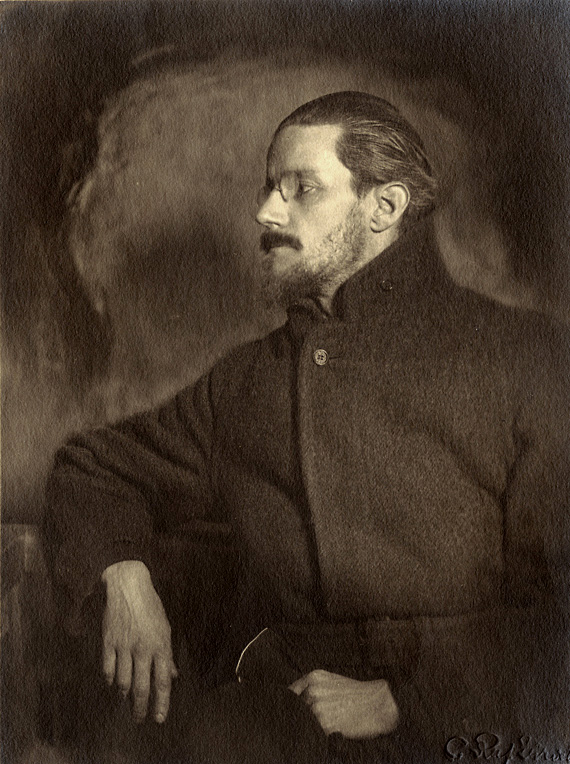
The song "Golden Hair" was based on a poem by James Joyce. Joyce is credited as a writer on the song.

Name of song, producer(s), original release, and year of release
Song	Producer(s)	Original release	Year	Ref.
"Baby Lemonade"	David Gilmour; Richard Wright	Barrett	1970	
"Birdie Hop" †	David Gilmour (Note: Credited as "Dave Gilmour" on the Opel record labels.)	Opel	1988	
"Bob Dylan Blues" †	David Gilmour	The Best of Syd Barrett: Wouldn't You Miss Me?	2001	
"Clowns and Jugglers" (Note: "Clowns and Jugglers" is an early version of "Octopus".) †	Malcolm Jones	Opel	1988	
"Dark Globe"	David Gilmour; Roger Waters	The Madcap Laughs	1970	
"Dolly Rocker" †	David Gilmour	Opel	1988	
"Dominoes"	David Gilmour; Richard Wright	Barrett	1970	
"Effervescing Elephant"	David Gilmour; Richard Wright	Barrett	1970	
"Feel"	David Gilmour; Roger Waters	The Madcap Laughs	1970	
"Gigolo Aunt"	David Gilmour; Richard Wright	Barrett	1970	
"Golden Hair" (Note: Written by Barrett–Joyce. Music by Barrett, based on a poem by James Joyce.)	David Gilmour; Roger Waters	The Madcap Laughs	1970	
"Here I Go"	Malcolm Jones	The Madcap Laughs	1970	
"If It's in You"	David Gilmour; Roger Waters	The Madcap Laughs	1970	
"It Is Obvious"	David Gilmour; Richard Wright	Barrett	1970	
"Lanky (Part 1)" †	Peter Jenner	Opel	1988	
"Late Night"	Malcolm Jones	The Madcap Laughs	1970	
"Let's Split" †	David Gilmour	Opel	1988	
"Long Gone"	David Gilmour; Roger Waters	The Madcap Laughs	1970	
"Love Song"	David Gilmour; Richard Wright	Barrett	1970	
"Love You"	Malcolm Jones	The Madcap Laughs	1970	
"Maisie"	David Gilmour; Richard Wright	Barrett	1970	
"Milky Way" †	David Gilmour	Opel	1988	
"No Good Trying"	Malcolm Jones	The Madcap Laughs	1970	
"No Man's Land"	Malcolm Jones	The Madcap Laughs	1970	
"Octopus"	David Gilmour; Roger Waters	The Madcap Laughs	1970	
"Opel" †	Malcolm Jones	Opel	1988	
"Rats"	David Gilmour; Richard Wright	Barrett	1970	
"Rhamadan" (Note: An option to download the track online was given with the CD release.) †	Peter Jenner; Malcolm Jones	An Introduction to Syd Barrett	2010	
"She Took a Long Cold Look"	David Gilmour; Roger Waters	The Madcap Laughs	1970	
"Swan Lee (Silas Lang)" †	Peter Jenner	Opel	1988	
"Terrapin"	Malcolm Jones	The Madcap Laughs	1970	
"Two of a Kind" (Note: "Two of a Kind" is credited to Barrett on The Peel Session and other compilations the song appears on, including The Best of Syd Barrett: Wouldn't You Miss Me?. However, Richard Wright reportedly wrote the song but Barrett insisted it was his own composition and wanted to include it on The Madcap Laughs.) (Note: Performed and recorded for the John Peel Top Gear radio show on 24 February 1970.) †	John Walters	The Peel Session	1987	
"Waving My Arms in the Air"/"I Never Lied to You" (Note: "Waving My Arms in the Air" and "I Never Lied to You" were split into two separate tracks for the 1994 reissue of Barrett.)	David Gilmour; Richard Wright	Barrett	1970	
"Wined and Dined"	David Gilmour; Richard Wright	Barrett	1970	
"Wolfpack"	David Gilmour; Richard Wright	Barrett	1970	
"Word Song" †	David Gilmour	Opel	1988	
"Wouldn't You Miss Me" (Note: "Wouldn't You Miss Me" is an early version of "Dark Globe".) †	David Gilmour; Roger Waters	Opel	1988	

== Bibliography ==
- Chapman, Rob (2010). Syd Barrett: A Very Irregular Head (Paperback ed.). London: Faber. ISBN 978-0-571-23855-2.
- Manning, Toby (2006). The Rough Guide to Pink Floyd (1st ed.). London: Rough Guides. ISBN 1-84353-575-0.
- Palacios, Julian (2010). Syd Barrett & Pink Floyd: Dark Globe (Rev. ed.). London: Plexus. ISBN 978-0-85965-431-9.
- Di Perna, Alan; Kitts, Jeff; Tolinski, Brad (2002). Kitts, Jeff (ed.). Guitar World Presents Pink Floyd (1st ed.). Milwaukee, WI: Hal Leonard. ISBN 978-0-634-03286-8.
- Povey, Glenn (2008) [2007]. Echoes: The Complete History of Pink Floyd. Mind Head Publishing. ISBN 978-0-9554624-1-2.
- Schaffner, Nicholas (1991). Saucerful of Secrets (First ed.). Sidgwick & Jackson. ISBN 978-0-283-06127-1.
- Watkinson, Mike; Anderson, Pete (2001). Crazy Diamond: Syd Barrett & the Dawn of Pink Floyd. Omnibus Press. ISBN 978-0-711-98835-4.

== See also ==
- Syd Barrett discography
- List of songs recorded by Pink Floyd
- List of unreleased songs recorded by Pink Floyd
