= Syd Barrett discography =

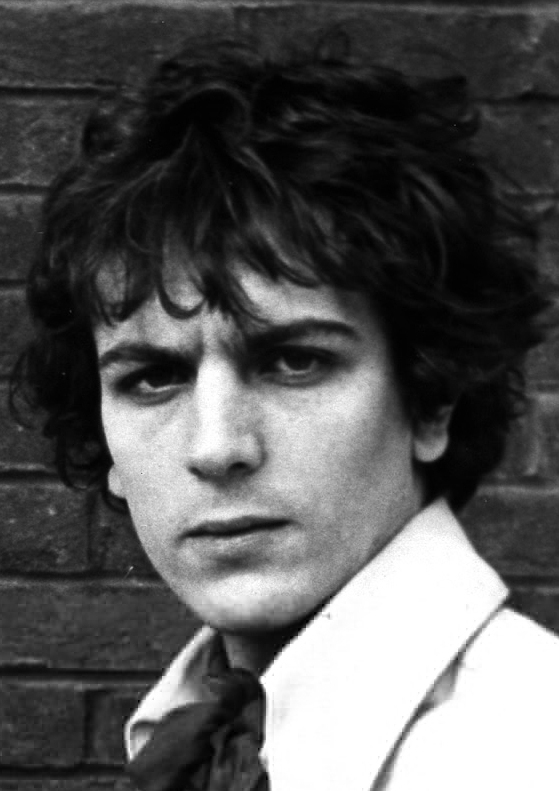
- Barrett in 1967
- Studio albums: 2
- Live albums: 2
- Compilation albums: 6
- Singles: 1

Syd Barrett (1946–2006) was an English rock musician who was best known as the original frontman and primary songwriter of Pink Floyd. With the band, he recorded and wrote the majority of songs for their first album The Piper at the Gates of Dawn, and was credited for one song ("Jugband Blues") on their second album A Saucerful of Secrets. To this day, his Pink Floyd songs are used frequently on the band's various compilations.

After he left Pink Floyd, he recorded two solo albums, The Madcap Laughs and Barrett. Both albums, released in 1970, were re-released as a double album in 1974, after the unexpected success of Pink Floyd's The Dark Side of the Moon. On 24 February 1970, he recorded five songs (one from The Madcap Laughs, three from Barrett, and a one-off, "Two of a Kind") for the BBC Radio show Top Gear. These songs were released as a mini-album, in 1987, as Syd Barrett: The Peel Session. In 2004, the five songs from Top Gear, and three songs from a then-newly discovered tape of Bob Harris show, were released as The Radio One Sessions.

== Solo career ==
=== Albums ===
==== Studio ====
List of studio albums, with selected chart positions
Title	Album details	Peak chart positions
Title	Album details	UK
The Madcap Laughs	Released: 2 January 1970; Label: Harvest/EMI	40
Barrett	Released: November 1970; Label: Harvest/EMI	—

==== Live ====
List of live albums, with selected details
Title	Album details
The Peel Session	Released: 25 January 1987; Label: Strange Fruit
The Radio One Sessions	Released: 29 March 2004; Label: Strange Fruit

==== Compilations ====
List of compilation albums, with selected chart positions
Title	Album details	Peak chart positions	
Title	Album details	UK	US
Syd Barrett	Released: 14 November 1974; Label: Harvest/EMI	—	163
Opel	Released: 17 October 1988; Label: Harvest/EMI	—	—
Octopus: The Best of Syd Barrett	Released: 29 May 1992; Label: Cleopatra Records	—	—
Crazy Diamond	Released: 26 April 1993; Label: Harvest/EMI	—	—
The Best of Syd Barrett: Wouldn't You Miss Me?	Released: 16 April 2001; Label: Harvest/EMI	—	—
An Introduction to Syd Barrett	Released: 19 October 2010; Label: Harvest/EMI	104	—
"—" denotes a release that did not chart.

=== Singles ===
Title	Year	Album
"Octopus"	1969	The Madcap Laughs

== Appearances ==
- Joy of a Toy by Kevin Ayers (November 1969): plays guitar on "Religious Experience" ("Singing a Song in the Morning") – bonus track on remastered 2003 CD.

== See also ==
- Pink Floyd discography
- List of songs recorded by Syd Barrett
