= Crazy Diamond =

Box set by Syd Barrett
- Released: 26 April 1993
- Recorded: Abbey Road May 1968 – July 1970
- Genre: Rock
- Length: 2:58:37
- Label: Harvest
- Producers: Syd Barrett, Peter Jenner, Malcolm Jones, Roger Waters and David Gilmour

Syd Barrett chronology
Octopus: The Best of Syd Barrett (1992)	Crazy Diamond (1993)	Wouldn't You Miss Me? (2001)

Professional ratings
Review scores
Source	Rating
Allmusic	4.5/5 stars

Crazy Diamond is a 1993 triple-CD boxed set of Syd Barrett's two 1970 albums The Madcap Laughs and Barrett, and Opel, an out-takes compilation from 1988. All discs are further augmented by various alternate takes.

"Our main plan was to find Syd's acoustic takes, before the other musicians were drafted in to overdub them. But we stumbled across some fascinating material that sheds new light on Syd's working methods." — Phil Smee

== Design and release ==
The box set is packaged in a 6 x 12-inch longbox, and also contains a 24-page booklet.

Simultaneously with this release, EMI reissued The Madcap Laughs, Barrett and Opel separately as well, along with the new bonus tracks of alternate takes.

Two unreleased Syd Barrett songs with Pink Floyd, "Scream Thy Last Scream" and "Vegetable Man" were remixed by Malcolm Jones, and were planned to be released on Opel, but they were pulled, apparently by Pink Floyd.

== Title ==
The album is named after "Shine On You Crazy Diamond", a composition by Pink Floyd about and dedicated to Barrett, who led the band during its earlier years.

== Track listing ==
All songs written by Syd Barrett, except where noted.

=== Disc 1 – The Madcap Laughs ===
1. "Terrapin" – 5:04
2. "No Good Trying" – 3:26
3. "Love You" – 2:30
4. "No Man's Land" – 3:03
5. "Dark Globe" – 2:02
6. "Here I Go" – 3:11
7. "Octopus" – 3:47
8. "Golden Hair" (Syd Barrett/James Joyce) – 1:59
9. "Long Gone" – 2:50
10. "She Took a Long Cold Look" – 1:55
11. "Feel" – 2:17
12. "If It's in You" – 2:26
13. "Late Night" – 3:11
14. "Octopus" (Takes 1 & 2) – 3:09
15. "It's No Good Trying" (Take 5) – 6:22
16. "Love You" (Take 1) – 2:28
17. "Love You" (Take 3) – 2:11
18. "She Took a Long Cold Look at Me" (Take 4) – 2:44
19. "Golden Hair" (Take 5) (Barrett/Joyce) – 2:28
- Tracks 14–19: Bonus tracks

=== Disc 2 – Barrett ===
1. "Baby Lemonade" – 4:11
2. "Love Song" – 3:05
3. "Dominoes" – 4:09
4. "It Is Obvious" – 3:00
5. "Rats" – 3:02
6. "Maisie" – 2:51
7. "Gigolo Aunt" – 5:47
8. "Waving My Arms in the Air" – 2:07
9. "I Never Lied to You" – 1:52
10. "Wined and Dined" – 2:59
11. "Wolfpack" – 3:41
12. "Effervescing Elephant" – 1:54
13. "Baby Lemonade" (Take 1) – 3:46
14. "Waving My Arms in the Air" (Take 1) – 2:13
15. "I Never Lied to You" (Take 1) – 1:48
16. "Love Song" (Take 1) – 2:32
17. "Dominoes" (Take 1) – 0:40
18. "Dominoes" (Take 2) – 2:36
19. "It Is Obvious" (Take 2) – 3:51
- Tracks 13–19: Bonus tracks

=== Disc 3 – Opel ===
1. "Opel" – 6:26
2. "Clowns and Jugglers" (Original version of Octopus) – 3:27
3. "Rats" – 3:12
4. "Golden Hair" (Barrett/Joyce) – 1:44
5. "Dolly Rocker" – 3:01
6. "Word Song" – 3:19
7. "Wined and Dined" – 3:03
8. "Swan Lee (Silas Lang)" – 3:13
9. "Birdie Hop" – 2:30
10. "Let's Split" – 2:23
11. "Lanky (Part One)" – 5:32
12. "Wouldn't You Miss Me (Dark Globe)" – 3:00
13. "Milky Way" – 3:07
14. "Golden Hair" (Instrumental version) – 1:56
15. "Gigolo Aunt" (Take 9) – 4:02
16. "It Is Obvious" (Take 3) – 3:44
17. "It Is Obvious" (Take 5) – 3:06
18. "Clowns and Jugglers" (Take 1) – 3:33
19. "Late Night" (Take 2) – 3:19
20. "Effervescing Elephant" (Take 2) – 1:28
- Tracks 15–20: Bonus tracks

== Tracks not included in this collection that were later officially released ==
1. "Bob Dylan Blues" – 3:14
  As seen on The Best of Syd Barrett: Wouldn't You Miss Me? (2001) and An Introduction to Syd Barrett (2010).
2. "Matilda Mother" (Alternate version) – 3:14
  As seen on An Introduction to Syd Barrett (2010).
3. "Rhamadan" – 20:09
  As seen on An Introduction to Syd Barrett (2010) and The Madcap Laughs 2015 Japanese reissue.
4. All 8 tracks from The Radio One Sessions (2004).

== Personnel ==
- Syd Barrett – acoustic guitar, electric Guitar, vocals, producer
- Tim Chacksfield – project coordinator
- David Gilmour – producer
- Brian Hogg – liner notes, compilation, mixing, compilation supervisor, remix supervision
- Peter Jenner – producer
- Malcolm Jones – producer
- Alan Rogers – illustrations
- Phil Smee – compilation, mixing, package design, compilation supervisor, remix supervision
- Roger Waters – producer
- Rick Wright – producer, keyboards and vocal for "Golden Hair (Take 5)"
