= Octopus: The Best of Syd Barrett =

Greatest hits album by Syd Barrett
- Released: 29 May 1992
- Genre: Rock
- Length: 52:14
- Label: Cleopatra Records
- Producer: Syd Barrett, David Gilmour, Malcolm Jones and Peter Jenner

Syd Barrett chronology
Opel (1988)	Octopus: The Best of Syd Barrett (1992)	Crazy Diamond (1993)

Professional ratings
Review scores
Source	Rating
AllMusic	3.5/5 stars

Octopus: The Best of Syd Barrett, released 29 May 1992, is a one-disc compilation of songs by Syd Barrett. It contains songs from his two solo albums, The Madcap Laughs and Barrett, and the compilation outtakes/rarities album, Opel. This album was later superseded by The Best of Syd Barrett: Wouldn't You Miss Me?.

== Track listing ==
No.	Title	Original Album	Length
1.	"Octopus"	The Madcap Laughs	3:48
2.	"Swan Lee (Silas Lang)"	Opel	3:14
3.	"Baby Lemonade"	Barrett	4:10
4.	"Late Night"	The Madcap Laughs	3:14
5.	"Wined and Dined"	Barrett	2:56
6.	"Golden Hair"	The Madcap Laughs	2:00
7.	"Gigolo Aunt"	Barrett	5:45
8.	"Wolfpack"	Barrett	3:45
9.	"It Is Obvious"	Barrett	2:56
10.	"Lanky (Part One)"	Opel	5:32
11.	"No Good Trying"	The Madcap Laughs	3:25
12.	"Clowns and Jugglers"	Opel	3:27
13.	"Waving My Arms in the Air"	Barrett	2:07
14.	"Opel"	Opel	6:26
Total length:			52:45
