= Syd Barrett (album) =

Compilation album by Syd Barrett
- Released: 14 November 1974
- Recorded: Abbey Road, May 1968 – July 1970
- Genre: Rock
- Length: 76:30
- Label: Harvest/EMI
- Producers: Syd Barrett, Peter Jenner, Malcolm Jones, Roger Waters, David Gilmour and Richard Wright.

Syd Barrett chronology
Barrett (1970)	Syd Barrett (1974)	Syd Barrett: The Peel Sessions (1987)

Professional ratings
Review scores
Source	Rating
AllMusic	4.5/5 stars
Christgau's Record Guide	B
Tom Hull	C

Syd Barrett is a 1974 double-album pairing of Syd Barrett's two solo albums, The Madcap Laughs and Barrett, both originally released in the UK in 1970.

== Cover ==
During the summer of 1965, Barrett had his first acid trip in the garden of his friend Dave Gale, with Ian Moore and Storm Thorgerson. While under the influence of the substance, Barrett had placed an orange, plum and a matchbox into a corner, while staring at the fruit, which he claimed symbolized "Venus and Jupiter". Thorgerson used this imagery when he added these items to the cover of Syd Barrett.

== Release ==
After the unexpectedly massive success of Pink Floyd's The Dark Side of the Moon, EMI re-issued the Barrett-era albums The Piper at the Gates of Dawn and A Saucerful of Secrets as A Nice Pair in the hope that fans would be interested in the band's earlier work with Barrett. Once that was a success, primarily in the US, Syd Barrett was compiled to meet demand.

As a result, The Madcap Laughs/Barrett (as it was titled in the US) made number 163, giving Barrett his only US chart album. Village Voice critic Robert Christgau wrote of the album: "Admittedly, a lot of what results is worthy of the wimp-turned-acid-casualty Barrett is. But a lot of it is funny, charming, catchy--whimsy at its best... I know damn well it gives me more pleasure than The Dark Side of the Moon."

== Track listing ==
All songs by Syd Barrett, except where noted.

=== Disc 1 – The Madcap Laughs ===
Side one

1. "Terrapin" – 5:04
2. "No Good Trying" – 3:26
3. "Love You" – 2:30
4. "No Man's Land" – 3:03
5. "Dark Globe" – 2:02
6. "Here I Go" – 3:11

Side two

7. "Octopus" – 3:47
8. "Golden Hair" (Syd Barrett/James Joyce) – 1:59
9. "Long Gone" – 2:50
10. "She Took a Long Cold Look" – 1:55
11. "Feel" – 2:17
12. "If It's in You" – 2:26
13. "Late Night" – 3:11

=== Disc 2 – Barrett ===
Side one

1. "Baby Lemonade" – 4:11
2. "Love Song" – 3:05
3. "Dominoes" – 4:09
4. "It is Obvious" – 3:00
5. "Rats" – 3:02
6. "Maisie" – 2:51

Side two

7. "Gigolo Aunt" – 5:47
8. "Waving My Arms in the Air" – 2:07
9. "I Never Lied to You" – 1:52
10. "Wined and Dined" – 2:59
11. "Wolfpack" – 3:41
12. "Effervescing Elephant" – 1:54

== Charts ==
Album - Billboard

Year	Chart	Position
1974	Pop Albums	163
