= The Best of Syd Barrett: Wouldn't You Miss Me? =

Greatest hits album by Syd Barrett
- Released: 16 April 2001
- Recorded: Abbey Road; May 1968 – July 1970
- Genre: Rock
- Length: 73:21
- Label: Harvest (UK); Capitol (US)
- Producer: Syd Barrett, Peter Jenner, Malcolm Jones, Roger Waters and David Gilmour

Syd Barrett chronology
Crazy Diamond (1993)	The Best of Syd Barrett: Wouldn't You Miss Me? (2001)	Syd Barrett: The Radio One Sessions (2004)

Professional ratings
Review scores
Source	Rating
AllMusic	4/5 stars
Encyclopedia of Popular Music	4/5 stars
The Guardian	2/5 stars
NME	4/5 stars
OndaRock	7/10
The New Rolling Stone Album Guide	3.5/5 stars
Pitchfork	8.5/10

The Best of Syd Barrett: Wouldn't You Miss Me? is a compilation album by Syd Barrett released in 2001 that spans Barrett's entire solo career. It was released on 16 April 2001 in the UK and 11 September 2001 in the US.

== Content ==
Comprising highlights from Syd Barrett's two 1970 albums The Madcap Laughs (seven songs), Barrett (nine songs), and the 1988 out-takes collection Opel (four songs), the album was issued to service casual Barrett fans who presumably would only require one disc of his music.

As a bonus to dedicated Barrett followers, The Best of Syd Barrett: Wouldn't You Miss Me? includes "Two of a Kind", from Barrett's John Peel radio show performance in February 1970, and, courtesy of David Gilmour's personal collection, Barrett's previously unreleased "Bob Dylan Blues", an original recorded a few days after "Two of a Kind", that before this release was a very rare and sought-after song.

== Track listing ==
All songs by Syd Barrett, except where noted.

The Best of Syd Barrett: Wouldn't You Miss Me? track listing
No.	Title	Original album	Length
1.	"Octopus"	The Madcap Laughs	3:48
2.	"Late Night"	The Madcap Laughs	3:14
3.	"Terrapin"	The Madcap Laughs	5:03
4.	"Swan Lee (Silas Lang)"	Opel	3:14
5.	"Wolfpack"	Barrett	3:45
6.	"Golden Hair" (Barrett, James Joyce)	The Madcap Laughs	1:59
7.	"Here I Go"	The Madcap Laughs	3:11
8.	"Long Gone"	The Madcap Laughs	2:49
9.	"No Good Trying"	The Madcap Laughs	3:25
10.	"Opel"	Opel	6:26
11.	"Baby Lemonade"	Barrett	4:10
12.	"Gigolo Aunt"	Barrett	5:45
13.	"Dominoes"	Barrett	4:06
14.	"Wouldn't You Miss Me (Dark Globe)"	Opel	3:00
15.	"Wined and Dined"	Barrett	2:56
16.	"Effervescing Elephant"	Barrett	1:53
17.	"Waving My Arms in the Air"	Barrett	2:07
18.	"I Never Lied to You"	Barrett	1:49
19.	"Love Song"	Barrett	3:02
20.	"Two of a Kind"	The Peel Session ^{†}	2:35
21.	"Bob Dylan Blues"	Previously unreleased	3:14
22.	"Golden Hair" (Instrumental)	Opel	1:50
Total length:			73:21

^† — Possibly written by Richard Wright (according to David Gilmour), though Barrett insisted it was his own composition.

== Production ==
- Syd Barrett – producer
- Tim Chacksfield – project coordinator
- David Gilmour – producer
- Peter Jenner – producer
- Malcolm Jones – producer, overdub producer
- Peter Mew – transfers, remastering
- Mark Paytress – liner notes
- Nigel Reeve – project coordinator
- Phil Smee – package design
