= Stars (British band) =

British rock band (1972)

- Origin: Cambridge, England, United Kingdom
- Genres: Progressive rock, psychedelic rock, folk rock, jazz fusion
- Years active: 1972
- Past members: Syd Barrett; John "Twink" Alder; Jack Monck

Stars were a short-lived British supergroup that played a small number of live concerts in Cambridge in January and February 1972. Its members were Syd Barrett on guitar, Twink on drums, and Jack Monck on bass.

== Beginnings ==
After a spell in Morocco, Twink (ex-Pink Fairies) moved to Cambridge and worked with the 'Last Minute Put Together Boogie Band', initially with vocalist/guitarist Bruce Michael Paine (ex-Apple Pie & star of the San Francisco production of 'Hair') and John 'Honk' Lodge (Junior's Eyes, Quiver) playing bass. The Last Minute Put Together Boogie Band, now with ex-Delivery bass player Jack Monck, backed American Blues guitarist Eddie "Guitar" Burns at King's College Cellar on 26 January 1972. Jack's wife Jenny Spires, a friend of Twink's and former girlfriend of Syd Barrett (ex-Pink Floyd), went with Syd down to the gig and he brought his guitar along and jammed with them in the last set. At the "Six Hour Technicolor Dream" at the Cambridge Corn Exchange the next day (27 January), the Last Minute Put Together Boogie Band, with guests Fred Frith and Syd Barrett, played on a bill with Hawkwind and the Pink Fairies. The Boogie Band played four tracks before being joined on stage by Fred and Syd for a further three then followed by an additional two songs to close the set without Fred and Syd.

Within the next day or two Jenny, Jack & Twink said 'wouldn't it be great to get Syd playing again'. Twink recalled:

"We went round to his house and... Syd came to the door and Jenny said, 'Jack and Twink were thinking it would be nice to form a band, just the three of you.' So he said 'Yeah, alright, come in'. And that was that. We started rehearsing down in the basement of his house, that's how it started." "We were doing all of Syd's stuff, old material like 'Lucifer Sam'. We did about half a dozen gigs. I think it was a pretty tight set but some of the gigs were kind of loose because we didn't have road managers, we just had people helping out and stuff. We played all around the Cambridge area, didn't go out of Cambridge, just places like coffee bars - and we played the Market Square, that was the most memorable gig. It was a good gig, it was really brilliant." "And we did a few in the Dandelion Coffee Bar, I think we did two there & they were also good."

This gig was recorded, and while one mastertape was confiscated by EMI in 1985, another copy surfaced in 2005. In June 2010 this tape was offered for auction but failed to reach its reserve price. It was then purchased by the Easy Action label, who also hold the tapes of the Pink Fairies and Hawkwind sets from the same show. Easy Action released the Hawkwind set as an album licensed from EMI Music in 2012, and released the Last Minute Put Together Boogie Band tape as an album entitled Six Hour Technicolor Dream in June 2014.

== Performances ==
All 'Stars' performances contained Barrett-era Pink Floyd songs and tracks from Barrett's 1970 solo albums The Madcap Laughs and Barrett. The posters for the MC5 / Skin Alley gig also billed an appearance from a new line-up of the Last Minute Put Together Boogie Band - Bruce Paine, Rick Fenn, Bill Gray & Gary Luvaglia. Paine went on to join Steamhammer for a tour of Europe in late 1972 before returning to the United States.

Stars roadie and occasional bass player Joly MacFie said:

"Stars played a number of times at a hippie-community cafe called 'The Dandelion' and then one Saturday outdoor in the main square in Cambridge and then two shows at the (huge, cavernous) Corn Exchange on a Thursday and Saturday, two days later. Nektar had state of the art audio... I mixed the band. Another roadie was Nigel, who took care of the stage. I think it was a friend of his that taped the show. I was lent the tape by Nigel some months later and it sounded good; I gave it back without copying. I later heard he lost it... The MC5 show was not recorded and was not a good show. The promoter of these shows - Steve Brink - had promised that there would be no press; however he did invite a guy from the Melody Maker, Roy Hollingworth, who had some sort of nervous breakdown at the [MC5] show. He wrote a piece that came out the next Wednesday detailing a wave of absolute alienation he sensed at the show, and used Syd as a metaphor for it."

Hollingworth wrote:

"He played a demented solo that ran ragged lines of up to 10 minutes. His raggled hair fell over a face that fell over a guitar and seldom looked up. He changed time almost by the minute, the keys and chords made little sense. The fingers on his left hand met the frets like strangers. They formed chords, reformed them - apparently nearly got it right - and then wandered away again. Then Syd scratched his nose and let loose a very short sigh. It was like watching somebody piece together a memory that had suffered the most severe shell-shock. I don't know how much Syd Barrett remembered, but he didn't give in. Even though he lost his bassist and even though Twink couldn’t share Syd's journey, Syd played on. ...He has a beard now, but his eyes are still deep cavities hiding an inexplicable vision. Tuning up presents awkward problems. He holds his guitar like he’s never held a guitar before. He keeps scratching his nose. 'Madcap Laughs' opened the set. It didn’t sound much like it used to. But Syd’s voice did. A well-spoken wine - "Barth", "Larf". See Emily Play? The chords are out of tune and he keeps looking to his right and sort of scowling at Twink and the bassist, as though in disagreement. I stood and watched and thought he was bloody great. A girl gets up on stage and dances; he sees her, and looks fairly startled. As the clock ticked into the small hours of Friday morning, Syd retreated to the back of the stage trying to find one of those runs. He messes chords together. There is no pattern but if you think hard you can see a faint one, you can see some trailers in the sky. The large concrete floor is littered now, not with people but with their relics. Plastic cups that contained orange juice or lemon or coffee. And some squashed wholenut scones and buns. And underground papers. And Syd played on. Will anyone listen to the Madcap?" - "The Madcap Returns" (Melody Maker, 4 March 1972)

Jack Monck, speaking in 2001, agreed that the gig was below-par:

"I remember looking across at Syd, and just thinking 'you don't want to be here, do you?' He was kind of, like, going through the motions, the mic was here and he'd just sort of be singing like this [gesturing off to one side], and everybody just knew that the wheels had come off. You were just witnessing the breakdown of someone in performance. Some gigs are good and some are bad. Some are really bad, and that was probably the worst."

The Terrapin fanzine was more charitable in its review of what it called Syd's Final Performance (January 1973).

"[Syd] did versions of 'Octopus' and 'No Man's Land' from the Madcap album: 'Waving My Arms in the Air' and 'Baby Lemonade' from Barrett: and 'Lucifer Sam' from the legendary first Floyd album. Twink played drums and Jack Monck played bass until his amp decided it couldn't cope with Syd's musical journey and went dead! The lyrics were, for the most part, inaudible due to the terrible P.A., and Syd did no talking between the numbers, which were sadly under-rehearsed. But that was a genius on stage and he did show odd flashes of brilliance, but after about an hour Syd decided he had had enough, so he slowly unplugged and went home."

The damage had already been done when Barrett read the Melody Maker review the following week, despite Joly's assertion that the Cambridge Corn Exchange gig with Nektar, two days later, was an improvement - a claim which Twink seemed to back up:

"I did have once one of the Stars gigs, between me & Joly, who was a friend I was working with at the time. He used to make badges. He had a tape but I don't know what happened to it. The tapes were good. The band didn't stay together very long. Straight after that gig the bad press that we got, I think it was Roy Hollingworth, Melody Maker, he did a piece & he killed the band in fact, with that review. 'Cos Syd came round with it in his hand the next day, he saw it & says 'I don't want to play anymore'. So that was it. I mean I expected that, I thought that that was a possibility that something like that might happen, but it was a shame that it did. We tried to do [a proposed gig at Essex University] without Syd, because Syd had said that he didn't want to play anymore - but we had that booked so we all went down there with the intention of playing, I'd brought another couple of musicians in to cover for Syd. But in fact the promoter didn't want us to play 'cos Syd wasn't there - so it was a bit of a disaster... It was the wrong thing to do, we should've pulled out. But we decided to go down there and it didn't work out."

Guitarist Bernie Elliott was the musician recruited for the Syd-less Stars gigs, alternatively recalled as having been at Seymour Hall in London.Oxford, Essex Uni. At some point during 1972, Twink, Monck, Dan Kelleher (guitar/keyboards) and George Bacon (guitar) completed a recording session at London's Polydor Studios, with one song later surfacing on a 1991 compilation album. In late 1972, Monck started a new band called Rocks Off with Rusty Burnhill.

== Aftermath ==
Shortly thereafter Syd Barrett left music and his public life altogether and began living in seclusion, but not before Syd performed with Jack Bruce in Cambridge during the Summer of 1973. A night of poetry and music was arranged by Bruce and his writing partner Pete Brown, and when Brown arrived at the gig (having been delayed) he found Bruce jamming with local musicians, one of whom he recalled was playing acoustic jazz guitar. When Brown started his poetry reading, he dedicated one to Syd Barrett, stating that he started the Psychedelic movement in England—only to then see the man with the guitar stand up and say, "No I didn't." Brown only then realized this was Barrett himself. This appears to be the last time he ever performed in public.

Recordings of Stars performances were made but remain lost. American photographer Victor Kraft is known to have recorded (and photographed) the Dandelion gigs, but after his death in 1976 his possessions were removed from his flat by his Cambridge landlord. As mentioned above, the concert with Nektar was recorded but the tapes were lost, although the Boogie Band show with Hawkwind and the Pink Fairies still exists, and a recording of the Eddie "Guitar" Burns gig is also rumoured to have survived. Twink also claimed that Syd had recorded all of their rehearsals on cassette and kept the tapes, but their fate is unknown. Roy Hollingworth, told of the cause of Stars' breakup several years later, was deeply upset, "It was never my intention to harm Syd because I was his biggest fan. He was one of my heroes. I wrote about what I saw and heard as sensitively as I could and it certainly wasn't meant to be a big put down. A little piece of me died that night too. But on a personal level if it hurt Syd I'm very sorry. Ideally, I'd have loved it if he had made a great comeback and gone on and on and on."

== Known 'Stars' appearances ==
- Saturday 29 January 1972 – The Dandelion Coffee Bar, Cambridge
- Saturday 5 February 1972 – The Dandelion Coffee Bar, Cambridge
- Saturday 12 February 1972 – Petty Cury (near the Market Square), Cambridge
- February 1972 – The Dandelion Coffee Bar, Cambridge
- Thursday 24 February 1972 – The Corn Exchange, Cambridge (with MC5 & Skin Alley)
- Saturday 26 February 1972 – The Corn Exchange, Cambridge (with Nektar)
