= Bob Dylan Blues =

Song by Syd Barrett

Song by Syd Barrett

from the album The Best of Syd Barrett Wouldn't You Miss Me?
- Released: 16 April 2001
- Recorded: 1970
- Genre: Folk rock; blues rock
- Length: 3:14
- Label: Harvest (UK); Capitol (US)
- Songwriter(s): Syd Barrett
- Producer(s): David Gilmour

An Introduction to Syd Barrett track listing
- 18 tracks: 1. "Arnold Layne"; 2. "See Emily Play"; 3. "Apples and Oranges"; 4. "Matilda Mother"; 5. "Chapter 24"; 6. "Bike"; 7. "Terrapin"; 8. "Love You"; 9. "Dark Globe"; 10. "Here I Go"; 11. "Octopus"; 12. "She Took a Long Cool Look"; 13. "If It's In You"; 14. "Baby Lemonade"; 15. "Dominoes"; 16. "Gigolo Aunt"; 17. "Effervescing Elephant"; 18. "Bob Dylan Blues"

"Bob Dylan Blues" is a song written in 1965 by Syd Barrett, the founder of Pink Floyd. Recorded during sessions for Barrett, it was unreleased until it turned up in 2001. The song was included in The Best of Syd Barrett.

== Writing and recording ==
The song was supposedly written by Barrett after attending a Bob Dylan concert in 1964. The chorus (namely the line "Cause I'm a poet, don't you know it, and the wind, you can blow it.") references a lyric in Dylan's own "I Shall Be Free No. 10" released on Another Side of Bob Dylan. It is one of Barrett's very earliest songs written before he even had a publishing deal. This song, along with "Terrapin" and "Maisie", reflected Barrett's early interest in the blues.

The song was recorded on February 26, 1970, and was since largely forgotten about until David Gilmour unearthed the tape in his personal collection. It was released in 2001 on the Barrett compilation The Best of Syd Barrett: Wouldn't You Miss Me?.

In 2010, the track was digitally remastered and featured on the album An Introduction to Syd Barrett.

== Personnel ==
- Syd Barrett – acoustic guitar, lead and harmony vocals
