= Picnic – A Breath of Fresh Air =

Compilation album by various artists
- Released: 1970
- Genre: Progressive rock, folk rock
- Label: Harvest (UK)
- Producer: various

Picnic – A Breath of Fresh Air is a sampler issued by the Harvest Records label, originally released in 1970 and notable for including the previously unreleased Pink Floyd song, "Embryo".

The similarly-entitled A Breath of Fresh Air – A Harvest Records Anthology 1969–1974 released on 14 May 2007 borrowed most of the original title, but had only three tracks in common with its precursor (Pink Floyd's "Embryo", Panama Limited's "Round and Round", and Quatermass' "Black Sheep of the Family"). Although most tracks featured were of similar vintage, the album was a retrospective compilation, rather than a promotional sampler.

== History ==
EMI Records launched the Harvest label in 1969 to take advantage of the progressive rock market, and like many record labels at the time, they produced a budget-priced showcase album of their artists. Their roster of artists was large and interesting enough to support a double album retailing at 29s/11d (approximately £1.50). The result was an eclectic mixture of traditional folk, hard rock, psychedelia and obscurities.

The inclusion of "Embryo", without the approval of Pink Floyd, and which the band considered unfinished, resulted in the album's prompt withdrawal. Some editions do not credit the track to Pink Floyd on the inside cover.

== 1970 release track listing ==
Side one
No.	Title	Artist	Length
1.	"Into the Fire" (Blackmore/Lord/Paice/Gillan/Glover; from LP Deep Purple in Rock)	Deep Purple
2.	"Mother Dear" (Barclay James Harvest; from LP Barclay James Harvest)	Barclay James Harvest
3.	"Embryo" (Waters; previously unreleased)	Pink Floyd
4.	"Twisted Track" (Spedding/Brown; from LP Mantle-Piece)	The Battered Ornaments
5.	"Glenlogie" (Trad. arr. S. & D. Collins; from LP Love, Death and the Lady)	Shirley & Dolly Collins

Side two
No.	Title	Artist	Length
1.	"The Good Mr Square" (May/Waller; from LP Parachute))	Pretty Things
2.	"Song of the Ages" (H. Ash; from LP Flat Baroque and Berserk)	Roy Harper
3.	"This Worried Feeling" (Clempson/Poole; from LP Bakerloo)	Bakerloo
4.	"Eleanor's Cake (Which Ate Her)" (Ayers; from LP Joy of a Toy)	Kevin Ayers
5.	"Again and Again" (Watt-Roy; from LP "Horizons")	The Greatest Show on Earth

Side three
No.	Title	Artist	Length
1.	"Water" (Coff/Minns/Smith/Sweeney; from LP Third Ear Band)	Third Ear Band
2.	"Terrapin" (Barrett; from LP The Madcap Laughs)	Syd Barrett
3.	"A Glade Somewhere" (Welham/Allenby/Welham; from LP Forest)	Forest
4.	"Golden Country Kingdom" (Brown/Mullen; from LP Things May Come and Things May Go But The Art School Dance Goes On Forever)	Pete Brown & Piblokto!
5.	"Round and Round" (W.Shade; from LP Panama Limited Jug Band)	Panama Limited

Side four
No.	Title	Artist	Length
1.	"Black Sheep of the Family" (Steve Hammond; from Quatermass)	Quatermass
2.	"Postcards of Scarborough" (Chapman; from LP Fully Qualified Survivor)	Michael Chapman
3.	"Maybe My Mind (With Egg)" (Daw/Phillips; "An Asylum For The Musically Insane")	Tea and Symphony
4.	"Old Gopher" (S. Broughton; from LP Sing Brother Sing)	Edgar Broughton Band

== 2007 release track listing ==
=== Disc one ===
1. "Evil" – Edgar Broughton Band
2. "Listen Learn Read On" – Deep Purple (from The Book of Taliesyn 1968)
3. "Druid One" – Third Ear Band
4. "Station Song" – Pete Brown and His Battered Ornaments
5. "Rainmaker" – Michael Chapman
6. "Singing A Song In The Morning" – Kevin Ayers
7. "A Forsaking: Our Captain Cried" – Shirley and Dolly Collins
8. "Careful with That Axe, Eugene" – Pink Floyd (single b-side)
9. "Armchair Theatre" – Tea and Symphony
10. "Big Bear Ffolly" – Bakerloo
11. "Round And Round" – Panama Ltd. Jug Band
12. "Octopus" – Syd Barrett (from The Madcap Laughs 1970)
13. "Painter" – Deep Purple
14. "Country Morning" – Pete Brown & Piblokto!
15. "Francesca" – Roy Harper
16. "Bad Penny" – Forest
17. "Backwood" – Chris Spedding
18. "Real Cool World" – Greatest Show On Earth
19. "Breathe" – Roger Waters and Ron Geesin (from Music from The Body 1970)
20. "Taking Some Time On " – Barclay James Harvest

=== Disc two ===
1. "There's No Vibrations But Wait" – Edgar Broughton Band
2. "Soulful Lady" – Michael Chapman
3. "Entropy" – Quatermass
4. "Black Sheep Of The Family" – Quatermass
5. "Grass" – The Pretty Things
6. "Salisbury Plain" – Shirley & Dolly Collins
7. "Embryo" – Pink Floyd
8. "Shouldn't Have Took More Than You Gave" – Dave Mason
9. "Speed King" – Deep Purple
10. "Magic Woman Touch" – Greatest Show On Earth
11. "Aeroplane Head Woman" – Pete Brown & Piblokto!
12. "Baby Lemonade" – Syd Barrett
13. "Don't You Grieve" – Roy Harper
14. "October 26" – The Pretty Things
15. "Song from the Bottom of a Well" – Kevin Ayers
16. "First Leaf of Autumn" – Michael Chapman
17. "Call Me a Liar" – Edgar Broughton Band

=== Disc three ===
1. "She Said" – Barclay James Harvest
2. "South Africa" – Roy Harper
3. "Evening Over Rooftops" – Edgar Broughton Band
4. "Do Ya" – The Move
5. "When the City Sleeps" – Bombadil
6. "Lady Rachel" – Kevin Ayers (from Joy of a Toy 1969)
7. "10538 Overture" – Electric Light Orchestra
8. "The City (Part Three)" – Mark-Almond
9. "Spaceship" – Spontaneous Combustion
10. "Macbeth" – Third Ear Band
11. "Fresh Air" – Jan Akkerman
12. "Twelve Hours Of Sunset" – Roy Harper
13. "Wells Fargo" – Babe Ruth
14. "Showdown" – Electric Light Orchestra
15. "Jet Silver and the Dolls of Venus" – Be-Bop Deluxe

== Album cover ==
Inside of Picnic cover

None of the artists who were featured on the album are portrayed on the outer cover. The front and rear of the gatefold show a group of people wearing World War II gas masks sitting in sand dunes with a dead bird on the sand. The interior of the sleeve displays the covers of most of the albums from which the tracks are taken against the background of an incoming sea tide. This background features a family walking across the sands in a washed-out monochrome. The cover design and photographs are credited to Hipgnosis, famous for their progressive rock album cover designs.
