= Barrett (album) =

Studio album by Syd Barrett
- Released: November 1970
- Recorded: 26 February – 21 July 1970
- Studios: Abbey Road, London
- Genre: Psychedelic folk
- Length: 38:43
- Label: Harvest
- Producers: David Gilmour; Richard Wright

Syd Barrett chronology
The Madcap Laughs (1970)	Barrett (1970)	Syd Barrett (1974)

Barrett is the second and final studio album of new material by English musician Syd Barrett.

Recording began at Abbey Road Studios on 26 February 1970 and lasted for 15 sessions until 21 July. The album was produced by Barrett's former Pink Floyd bandmates David Gilmour and Richard Wright, who also contributed bass and keyboards respectively. Jerry Shirley played drums; he and Gilmour had played on Barrett's previous album, The Madcap Laughs (1970).

Barrett was released in November 1970 on Harvest Records in the United Kingdom; unlike The Madcap Laughs, it failed to chart. The album was re-released in 1974 as part of Syd Barrett, which was the first US issue of these LPs. No singles were issued from the album. It was remastered and reissued in 1993, as were Madcap and Barrett's other album, Opel (1988)—both as standalone releases and as part of the Crazy Diamond box set. A newly remastered version of Barrett was issued in 2010.

== Background ==
The initial sales and the critical and public reaction to Barrett's first solo album, The Madcap Laughs, were deemed sufficient and enthusiastic enough for EMI to sanction a second solo album by Barrett. On 24 February 1970, a month after releasing The Madcap Laughs, Barrett appeared on John Peel's Top Gear radio show, where he performed only one song from the newly released album ("Terrapin"), three that would later be recorded for Barrett ("Gigolo Aunt", "Baby Lemonade" and "Effervescing Elephant"), and a one-off ("Two of a Kind", which was written by Richard Wright). (Note: "Two of a Kind" was credited to Richard Wright on the original Peel Session release, but to Barrett on later releases, including The Best of Syd Barrett: Wouldn't You Miss Me?. Wright reportedly wrote the song but Barrett insisted it was his own composition (and wanted to include it on The Madcap Laughs).) The session producers had no verbal contact with Barrett, having communication with him only via Gilmour. For the radio session, Gilmour and Humble Pie drummer Jerry Shirley accompanied Barrett on bass and bongos, respectively. The version of "Gigolo Aunt" recorded for the radio session (and later released on 1988's The Peel Session) was unfinished, with Barrett merely singing the opening verse three times. Barrett played slide guitar on the radio version of "Baby Lemonade", with Gilmour on organ.

Two days later, he began working on his second album in Abbey Road Studios, with Gilmour as producer, and a trio of musicians: Richard Wright, Shirley and Gilmour. The main aim for the Barrett sessions was to give Barrett the structure and focus many felt was missing during the long and unwieldy sessions for The Madcap Laughs. Thus, the sessions were more efficiently run and the album was finished in considerably less time than The Madcap Laughs (six months, compared to Madcap's one year). On 6 June 1970, Barrett gave his one and only official solo performance, at the Olympia in Kensington, backed once more by Gilmour and Shirley. At the end of "Octopus", the fourth number of the set, Barrett baffled the audience and his backing musicians by abruptly taking off his guitar and walking off stage.

== Recording ==
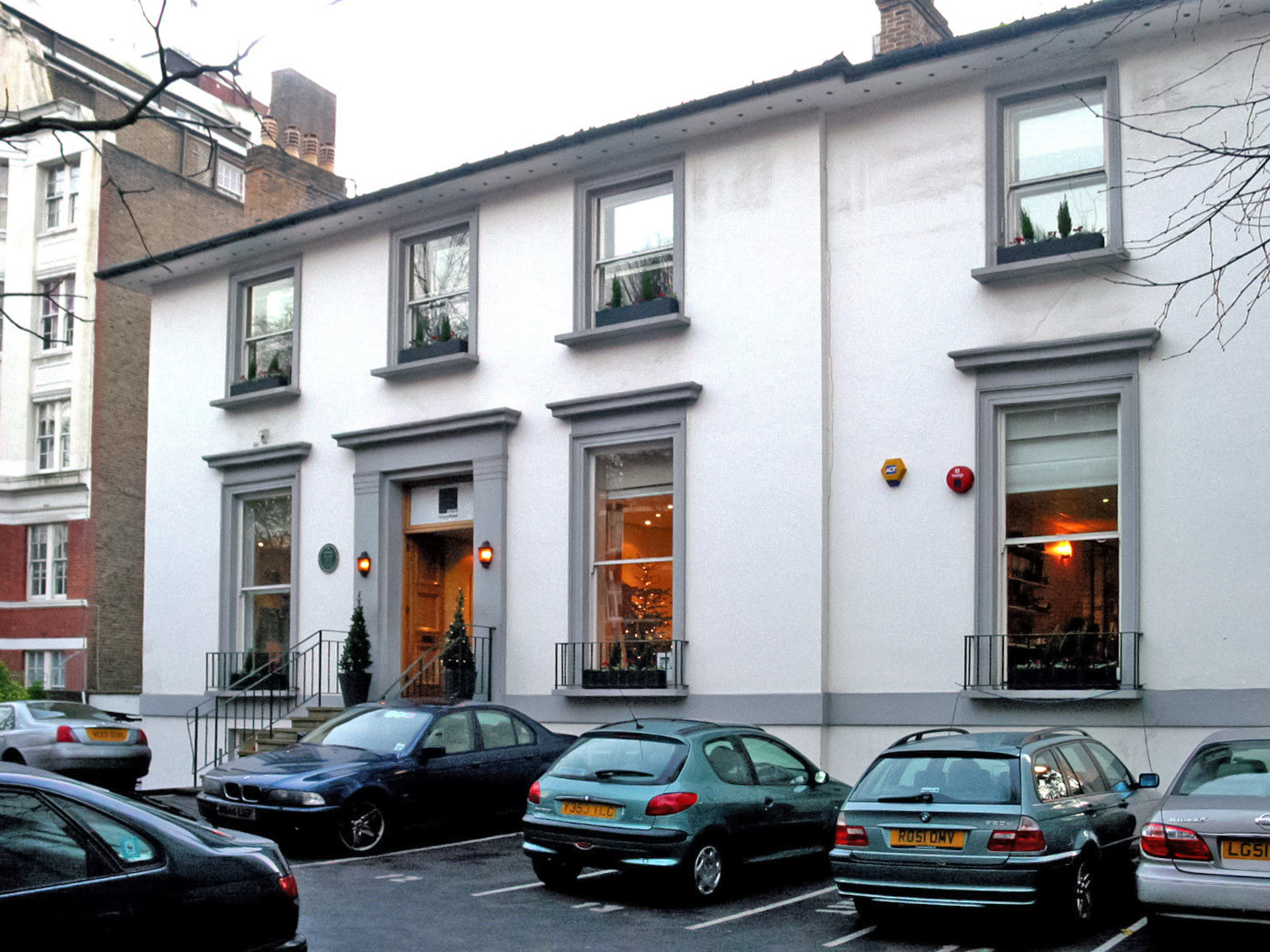
Recording took place at Abbey Road Studios

According to Jerry Shirley, "What David Gilmour wanted (and tried) to do, unlike the first record The Madcap Laughs, was have a unified rhythm section that played the entire record like any band would do. Which meant me on drums, David on bass, Rick Wright on keyboards, and Syd on ALL guitars, and that was something Dave was adamant about." The first session was on 26 February: three of the first songs—fully recorded—attempted during the session were "Baby Lemonade", "Maisie" and "Gigolo Aunt". (Note: "Baby Lemonade" and "Gigolo Aunt" were an attempt for Barrett to play and/or sing to an existing backing track.) However, Gilmour thought they were losing the "Barrett-ness". After "Baby Lemonade" was attempted, two takes of "Maisie" were recorded before Barrett went into 15 takes of "Gigolo Aunt". Jerry Shirley had commented on the final take of "Gigolo Aunt": "I was quite happy with 'Gigolo Aunt', Syd had played his parts so 'correctly' that I can remember at the end of the take we were flabbergasted. It was like we were thinking 'you're not that nuts afterall, you almost got through this take perfectly!'" (Note: Of the 15 takes for "Gigolo Aunt", three were complete: Take 7, Take 9, and Take 15. Take 9 is included on Opel, while Take 15 became the album master.) On the next day, two-track demos of "Wolfpack", "Waving My Arms in the Air", "Living Alone" and "Bob Dylan Blues", were recorded. The former two made it to the album; the latter two did not. On the recording sheet, it lists Gilmour as having taken home a copy of the latter two, Gilmour later returned and took the master tapes too. Gilmour has since said: "Those sessions were done so quickly. We were rushing to gigs every day and had to fit recording sessions in between. I probably took it away to have a listen and simply forgot to take it back. It wasn't intended to be a final mix. Syd knocked it off, I took a tape home." Despite some minor work made to "Gigolo Aunt", Barrett did not return to recording at Abbey Road Studios until 1 April, due to Pink Floyd working on their 1970 album, Atom Heart Mother. On various occasions, Barrett would "spy" on the band as they recorded the album. Again, he recorded some work to a song, "Wolfpack", on 3 April, before the sessions were postponed until 5 June, this time due to Gilmour and Wright going on tour in the US with Pink Floyd.

In the session of 5 June, Barrett managed to record an unknown number of two-track demos for three songs: "Rats", "Wined and Dined", and "Birdie Hop". (Note: Each of these would be later issued on Opel.) The "Rats" demo recorded at that time became the basis for the album master, and would later be overdubbed by musicians, despite the changing tempos. A session on 7 June saw the recording of "Milky Way" (Note: "Milky Way" was later issued on Opel.) and "Millionaire", and was rounded off with overdubs for "Rats". "Millionaire" was originally titled "She Was a Millionaire", and was originally recorded by Pink Floyd. Barrett recorded two attempts at a backing track before abandoning it, and adding vocals. Yet another break in recording occurred, until 14 July, where Barrett recorded several takes of "Effervescing Elephant", while numerous overdubs were added to Barrett's "Wined and Dined" demo by Gilmour. Three takes of "Dominoes" ensued, (Note: Takes 1 & 2 (the former being a false start, the latter a complete take) were included on the Crazy Diamond version of Barrett.) with an unknown number of takes of "Love Song", (Note: At this point, "Love Song" was untitled.) "Dolly Rocker" and "Let's Split" were recorded. (Note: Both "Dolly Rocker" and "Let's Split" later appeared on Opel.) "Love Song" and "Dolly Rocker" were both overdubbed, the former being overdubbed from 17 to 21 July, but overdubs for the latter were wiped. On 21 July, Barrett worked on another untitled track (later titled as "Word Song"), recording only one take, (Note: "Word Song" likewise was included on Opel.) before recording five takes of the last new song to be recorded for Barrett: "It Is Obvious". (Note: Originally titled "Mind Shot", the first take of "It Is Obvious" would become the album master. Take 2 (with Barrett on electric guitar) was included on the Crazy Diamond version of Barrett, while takes 3 & 5 (the former with Barrett on acoustic guitar, and featuring a riff similar to Muddy Waters' "I'm a Man", while the latter has Barrett on electric guitar) were included on the Crazy Diamond version of Opel.) Barrett worked on remakes of two tracks: "Maisie", and "Waving My Arms in the Air" (the latter now segueing into a new track, "I Never Lied to You").

Shirley said of Barrett's playing: "He would never play the same tune twice. Sometimes Syd couldn't play anything that made sense; other times what he'd play was absolute magic." Barrett's direction to the other musicians was limited to pronouncements like "Perhaps we could make the middle darker and maybe the end a bit middle afternoonish. At the moment it's too windy and icy".

Pete D'Arby, a mutual friend of Barrett and Gilmour, was invited by Gilmour to attend the sessions shortly before the recording of "Dominoes". According to D'Arby, one of the engineers had asked Barrett, "Well Syd, how many songs have you got?" to which Barrett replied "I've got twelve, thirteen". Barrett was then asked "which one of them are you going to do?", to which he replied, "all of them". The engineer was overheard by D'Arby saying "Get him out of here!". Gilmour said, "No, I'm paying for this. He does what he wants."

== Songs ==
Animals are a recurring item in not only the album, but Barrett's entire solo output.

=== Side one ===
"Baby Lemonade" opens the album. The intro is Barrett simply warming up on guitar; Gilmour managed to record it and placed it at the start of the album, making it seem like an intro to the song. The lyrics describe the way for a person to kill time (such as the line "In the clock they sent / Through a washing machine"). The solo was performed by Barrett, not Gilmour as is often noted. A recurring theme in the album, starting with "Baby Lemonade", is the weather. Barrett performed the song twice for the BBC (on 24 February 1970 for John Peel's Top Gear, and on 16 February 1971 for Bob Harris's show).

"Love Song" tells the story of an ex-girlfriend fondly remembered ("I knew a girl and I like her still"). It is the first of two songs which feature dreamlike-senses in the lyrics ("I'll lay my head down and see what I see"). Barrett performed the song for Bob Harris' show in 1971.

"Dominoes" features imagery of regret and recollection in the lyrics. The song features a backwards guitar solo by Barrett, and organ and Wurlitzer by Wright. The song's "You and I" lyric refers to the tail end relationship Barrett had with Lindsay. The first of three songs on the album which lyrics point to anguish ("In my tears, my dreams"). Barrett performed the song for Bob Harris' show in 1971.

"It Is Obvious" is the second of two songs which feature dreamlike-senses in the lyrics ("Creep into bed when your head's on the ground"). It is also the second of three songs on the album which lyrics point to anguish ("Remember those times I could call / Through the clear day time / And you would be there"). The theme of weather is referenced again ("The softness, the warmth and the weather in suspense"). The song also references the Cambridge quarry pits, and the landscape.

"Rats" started off as a jam, but eventually evolved into a structured song. It contains taunting and maniacal lyrics ("Rats rats lay down flat / We don't need you we act like that").

"Maisie" is a blues jam, with Barrett muttering the lyrics.

=== Side two ===
"Gigolo Aunt" was performed by Barrett for Top Gear in 1970, and issued on The Peel Session EP. In Barrett's only solo performance, at the Kensington Olympia in 1970, he played four songs, one of them being "Gigolo Aunt".

"Waving My Arms in the Air" contains an echo of "Octopus" ("Waving my arms in the air / Pressing my feet to the ground"). The lyrics refer to a hard-learned experience. The song features a childlike section ("No care / No no"). The song segues into "I Never Lied to You" with the aid of Wright's organ.

"I Never Lied to You" is the final of three songs on the album which lyrics point to anguish ("It's been so hard to bear with you not there").

"Wined and Dined" dated from Barrett's Cambridge days, and is about the relationship between Barrett and his then-girlfriend, Gayla Pinion, a model from Cambridge. The song reflects on about Mediterranean evenings ("Musk winds blow"), and hauntings of Barrett's childhood ("Chalk underfoot / Light ash of blue") evoked during a summer party he didn't want to leave. Dave Gilmour added a sinuous sliding lead over Barrett's vocals.

"Wolfpack" had been mentioned by Barrett in an interview, he said the song was one of favourites, out of all his material.

"Effervescing Elephant" was pastiche of the verse form of Hilaire Belloc's Cautionary Tales for Children. In contrast to "Dominoes", "It Is Obvious", "Rats", "Waving My Arms in the Air", and "Wolfpack" previously mentioning one or two animals, "Effervescing Elephant" contains references to a whole jungle full of animals. Barrett performed the song for Top Gear in 1970. In Barrett's only solo performance, at the Kensington Olympia in 1970, he played four songs, one of them being "Effervescing Elephant".

== Release and aftermath ==
Professional ratings
Review scores
Source	Rating
AllMusic	3.5/5 stars
Encyclopedia of Popular Music	3/5 stars
The Great Rock Discography	6/10
MusicHound Rock	3/5
Music Story	4/5 stars
New Musical Express	8/10
OndaRock	8.5/10
The New Rolling Stone Album Guide	3/5 stars
Spin Alternative Record Guide	6/10
Tom Hull	C

The cover of the album was designed by Barrett; it was originally one of many drawings Barrett had done in Cambridge, years earlier. Barrett was released in November 1970 to less interest than had greeted The Madcap Laughs earlier in the year, and as a result, failed to reach the chart. Talks of more singles and a third album were rumoured over the following months. Barrett dismissed the album and Madcap, saying: "They've got to reach a certain standard and that's probably reached in Madcap once or twice and on the other one only a little – just an echo of that. Neither of them are much more than that." AllMusic reviewer Ritchie Unterberger called the album "a bit fuller and smoother than the first album", referring to "Baby Lemonade", "Gigolo Aunt", and "Effervescing Elephant" as "among his peppiest and best-loved tunes"; however, "the tone is darker and more meandering" in the rest of the album. In an overview of Barrett's career, Rolling Stone referred to both Barrett's solo albums as "entrancing".

On 16 February 1971, Barrett recorded a short set for BBC Radio 1's Sounds of the Seventies radio show; in contrast to 1970's radio appearance on which Barrett performed new material, this time he played songs from Barrett: "Baby Lemonade", "Dominoes" and "Love Song". Bored and directionless, Barrett headed back to his hometown of Cambridge and – but for a brief dalliance with a band called Stars in 1972, and some abortive recording sessions in 1974 – left his music career behind for good.

Doing Syd's record was interesting, but extremely difficult. Dave [Gilmour] and Roger [Waters] did the first one (The Madcap Laughs) and Dave and myself did the second one. But by then it was just trying to help Syd any way we could, rather than worrying about getting the best guitar sound. You could forget about that! It was just going into the studio and trying to get him to sing.

— Richard Wright

The album was reissued in late 1974 with his first solo album The Madcap Laughs as record two of the two-record set Syd Barrett in Harvest's series of Harvest Heritage reissues. In 1993, Barrett (along with The Madcap Laughs and Opel) was reissued both independently (Note: UK EMI Harvest 7243 8 28907 2 0 / CDGO 2054) and as part of the Crazy Diamond Barrett box set, (Note: UK EMI Harvest 0777 7 81412 2 8 / SYD BOX 1) on 26 April 1993. "Bob Dylan Blues" would later turn up on 2001's The Best of Syd Barrett: Wouldn't You Miss Me?. A newly remastered version was released in 2010. (Note: Europe EMI Harvest 5099991755728) For release on An Introduction to Syd Barrett in 2010, Gilmour laid down a new bass track to four songs, only one of which came from Barrett: "Dominoes".

== Track listing ==
=== Original release ===
All tracks are written by Syd Barrett

Side one
No.	Title	Notes	Length
1.	"Baby Lemonade"	Take 1, recorded 26 February 1970	4:10
2.	"Love Song"	Take 1, recorded 14 July 1970, overdubs added 17 July	3:03
3.	"Dominoes"	Take 3, recorded 14 July 1970	4:08
4.	"It Is Obvious"	Take 1, recorded 17 July 1970, overdubs added 20 July	2:59
5.	"Rats"	Demo, recorded 7 May 1970, overdubs added 5 June	3:00
6.	"Maisie"	Take 2, recorded 26 February 1970	2:51

Side two
No.	Title	Notes	Length
7.	"Gigolo Aunt"	Take 15, recorded 27 February 1970, overdubs added 2 April	5:46
8.	"Waving My Arms in the Air/I Never Lied to You"	Take 1, recorded 27 February 1970, overdubs and new vocal track 2 April	3:59
9.	"Wined and Dined"	Take 10, recorded 14 July 1970	2:58
10.	"Wolfpack"	Take 2, recorded 3 April 1970	3:41
11.	"Effervescing Elephant"	Take 9, recorded 14 July 1970	1:52
Total length:			38:43

=== 1993 reissue ===
This reissue splits "Waving My Arms in the Air" and "I Never Lied to You" into tracks 8 and 9 respectively.

Bonus tracks
No.	Title	Notes	Length
13.	"Baby Lemonade"	*Take 1, recorded 26 February 1970: Guitar and double-track vocals only	3:46
14.	"Waving My Arms in the Air"	*Take 1, recorded 27 February 1970: Guitar and vocals only	2:13
15.	"I Never Lied to You"	*Take 1, recorded 27 February 1970: Guitar and vocals only	1:48
16.	"Love Song"	*Take 1, recorded 14 July 1970	2:32
17.	"Dominoes"	*Take 1, recorded 14 July 1970	0:40
18.	"Dominoes"	*Take 2, recorded 14 July 1970	2:36
19.	"It Is Obvious"	*Take 2, recorded 17 July 1970: Electric guitar and vocal	3:51
Total length:			56:13

=== 2015 Japanese reissue ===
No.	Title	Notes	Length
20.	"Bob Dylan Blues"	recorded February 1970	3:14
21.	"Dominoes" (2010 Mix)		4:07

== Personnel ==
- Syd Barrett – lead and backing vocals, electric and acoustic guitars, painting
- David Gilmour – bass, 12-string guitar, slide guitar (9), additional organ (4, 7), drums (3), production
- Richard Wright – Hammond organ, piano, harmonium, Wurlitzer electric piano, tack piano, production
- Vic Saywell – tuba (11)
- Jerry Shirley – drums, percussion
- John "Willie" Wilson – drums, percussion

=== Technical personnel ===
- Peter Bown – engineering
- Gareth Cousins – mixing on Crazy Diamond bonus tracks
- Mick Rock – photography (uncredited)
