= The Radio One Sessions (Syd Barrett album) =

Live album by Syd Barrett
- Released: 29 March 2004 (UK); 11 May 2004 (US)
- Recorded: 24 February 1970 & 16 February 1971
- Genre: Psychedelic rock
- Length: 19:54
- Label: Strange Fruit
- Producers: Pete Dauncey & John Muir

Syd Barrett chronology
Wouldn't You Miss Me? (2001)	The Radio One Sessions (2004)	An Introduction to Syd Barrett (2010)

Professional ratings
Review scores
Source	Rating
Allmusic	3/5 stars
BBC	favourable
Encyclopedia of Popular Music	3/5 stars
Pitchfork	6.3/10

The Radio One Sessions is a live album by former Pink Floyd vocalist and guitarist, Syd Barrett. It is the last Barrett album released in his lifetime before his death in 2006.

== Content ==
It features the complete Peel Session recordings that Barrett did for Top Gear (presented by Peel) on 24 February 1970, plus three unreleased songs recorded for a Bob Harris "Sounds of the Seventies" show on 16 February 1971. For the latter, the BBC no longer held the master tape; the source tape used for this compilation is an off-air bootleg recording of the show made during its original broadcast. Because a several generation old tape was used, the quality of these tracks is very poor. In recent years a lower generation copy, featuring Harris' introductions, has circulated among fans which has improved sound quality.

== Track listing ==
All songs by Syd Barrett (with the possible exception of "Two of a Kind"). (Note: "Two of a Kind" was credited to Richard Wright on the original Peel Session release, but to Barrett on later releases, including The Best of Syd Barrett: Wouldn't You Miss Me?. Wright reportedly wrote the song but Barrett insisted it was his own composition (and wanted to include it on The Madcap Laughs). When asked about the matter in a 1996 interview, Wright's reply was enigmatic: "Can't answer, I am looking into this.")

No.	Title	Writer(s)	Length
1.	"Terrapin"		3:09
2.	"Gigolo Aunt"		3:42
3.	"Baby Lemonade"		2:34
4.	"Effervescing Elephant"		1:02
5.	"Two of a Kind"	Richard Wright	2:35
6.	"Baby Lemonade"		2:23
7.	"Dominoes"		3:02
8.	"Love Song"		1:27
Total length:			19:54

== Personnel ==
- Syd Barrett – acoustic guitar, vocals
- David Gilmour – bass guitar, organ, electric guitar, backing vocals
- Jerry Shirley – percussion
- Pete Dauncey – producer
- John Muir – producer
- Barry Plummer – cover photo

== See also ==
- The Peel Session
