= Here I Go (Syd Barrett song) =

Song by Syd Barrett

from the album The Madcap Laughs
- Released: 3 January 1970
- Recorded: 17 April 1969
- Genre: Music hall; pop; vaudeville
- Length: 3:11
- Label: Harvest/EMI (UK); Capitol (US)
- Songwriter(s): Syd Barrett
- Producer(s): Malcolm Jones

The Madcap Laughs track listing
- 13 tracks Side one: 1. "Terrapin"; 2. "No Good Trying"; 3. "Love You"; 4. "No Man's Land"; 5. "Dark Globe"; 6. "Here I Go"; Side two: 7. "Octopus"; 8. "Golden Hair"; 9. "Long Gone"; 10. "She Took a Long Cold Look"; 11. "Feel"; 12. "If It's In You"; 13. "Late Night"

An Introduction to Syd Barrett track listing
- 18 tracks: 1. "Arnold Layne"; 2. "See Emily Play"; 3. "Apples and Oranges"; 4. "Matilda Mother"; 5. "Chapter 24"; 6. "Bike"; 7. "Terrapin"; 8. "Love You"; 9. "Dark Globe"; 10. "Here I Go"; 11. "Octopus"; 12. "She Took a Long Cool Look"; 13. "If It's In You"; 14. "Baby Lemonade"; 15. "Dominoes"; 16. "Gigolo Aunt"; 17. "Effervescing Elephant"; 18. "Bob Dylan Blues"

"Here I Go" is a song by former singer/songwriter of Pink Floyd, Syd Barrett and is the sixth track on his first solo album, The Madcap Laughs.

The song tells the story in which the narrator's girlfriend leaves him because "a big band is far better" than himself. He attempts to win her back by writing her a song, but when he goes to her house to show it to her, he instead finds himself falling in love with her sister.

== Writing ==
The song had already been written as early as 1967 and was previously titled "Boon Tune". While Pink Floyd were still working with Joe Boyd as their producer, Barrett offered Boyd a tape containing several demos, one of which was "Boon Tune", for the band to record. The other members, however, rejected the song, and it was offered to the Purple Gang, a jug band who had seen recent chart success with the song "Granny Takes a Trip", to record instead; due to pressure from their record label, they shelved the recording until 2006.

== Recording ==
During the recording sessions for The Madcap Laughs, for the session on 17 April 1969, Barrett brought in fellow musicians Jerry Shirley, drummer with Humble Pie, and Willie Wilson, Jokers Wild's drummer, although for this occasion he was playing bass. Working in Abbey Road Studio 2, the musicians recorded "No Man's Land" together, then they recorded "Here I Go" – the song required no overdubs of any kind. The session for these two songs only lasted three hours.

About 40 years later, for release on An Introduction to Syd Barrett, David Gilmour added bass to several tracks, including "Here I Go".

== Personnel ==
- Syd Barrett – vocals, electric guitar

With:

- Willie Wilson – drums
- David Gilmour – bass (re-release on An Introduction to Syd Barrett)
