= An Introduction to Syd Barrett =

Greatest hits album by Syd Barrett
- Released: 4 October 2010
- Recorded: January 1967 – July 1970
- Studios: Sound Techniques, Abbey Road, London
- Genre: Rock
- Length: 59:31
- Labels: Harvest (UK); Capitol (US); Sony Music (2023 US Reissue)
- Producers: Joe Boyd; Norman Smith; Malcolm Jones; David Gilmour; Roger Waters; Syd Barrett

Syd Barrett chronology
Syd Barrett: The Radio One Sessions (2004)	An Introduction to Syd Barrett (2010)

Professional ratings
Review scores
Source	Rating
AllMusic	4.5/5 stars
Mojo	4/5 stars
MusicOMH	4/5 stars
Now	3/5 stars
PopMatters	9/10 stars
Record Collector	4/5 stars
Uncut	4/5 stars

An Introduction to Syd Barrett is a compilation album containing works of Syd Barrett spanning the period 1967–1970, including both material written during his time with Pink Floyd and his post-band solo career.

== Release ==
The album was released in the UK and Europe on 4 October 2010, with different release dates for the rest of the world. The album features a series of new remasters and remixes, all overseen by Pink Floyd's David Gilmour. The cover art, featuring various images relating to songs contained within the album, was designed and created by long-term Pink Floyd conceptual artist Storm Thorgerson. The album reached 104 on the UK Albums Chart.

An extra track for iTunes is the previously unreleased 20-minute-long instrumental "Rhamadan", with the physical version providing a link to download it.

== Track listing ==
All songs written and composed by Syd Barrett. All tracks were digitally remastered in 2010, except where noted.

An Introduction to Syd Barrett track listing
No.	Title	Original album	Length
1.	"Arnold Layne"	Pink Floyd's debut single	2:54
2.	"See Emily Play"	Pink Floyd's second single	2:52
3.	"Apples and Oranges" (Stereo Version)	Pink Floyd's third single	3:04
4.	"Matilda Mother" (2010 Mix)	The Piper at the Gates of Dawn	3:57
5.	"Chapter 24"	The Piper at the Gates of Dawn	3:39
6.	"Bike"	The Piper at the Gates of Dawn	3:22
7.	"Terrapin"	The Madcap Laughs	5:03
8.	"Love You"	The Madcap Laughs	2:26
9.	"Dark Globe"	The Madcap Laughs	1:59
10.	"Here I Go" (2010 Mix, Additional Bass by Gilmour)	The Madcap Laughs	3:18
11.	"Octopus" (2010 Mix)	The Madcap Laughs	3:54
12.	"She Took a Long Cold Look" (2010 Mix)	The Madcap Laughs	1:46
13.	"If It's in You"	The Madcap Laughs	2:23
14.	"Baby Lemonade"	Barrett	4:07
15.	"Dominoes" (2010 Mix)	Barrett	4:05
16.	"Gigolo Aunt"	Barrett	5:43
17.	"Effervescing Elephant"	Barrett	1:51
18.	"Bob Dylan Blues"	The Best of Syd Barrett: Wouldn't You Miss Me?	3:08
Total length:			59:31

Download bonus track
No.	Title	Original album	Length
19.	"Rhamadan"	Previously unreleased. Available only as a download when the album is bought on CD, or from iTunes.	20:09
Total length:			79:40

Notes

- Tracks 1–6 are performed with Pink Floyd.
- Tracks 1–4 were later released as part of the Pink Floyd box set, The Early Years 1965–1972.
- Track 19 was later released as an additional bonus track on the 2015 Japanese reissue of The Madcap Laughs.

== Personnel ==
Pink Floyd

- Syd Barrett – lead guitar and vocals
- Roger Waters – bass guitar and vocals
- Richard Wright – organ, piano and vocals
- Nick Mason – drums
