= Lucifer Sam =

Song by Pink Floyd

from the album The Piper at the Gates of Dawn
- Released: 5 August 1967
- Recorded: 12–18 April 1967
- Genre: Psychedelic pop; space rock; surf rock; garage rock; proto-punk
- Length: 3:07
- Label: EMI Columbia; Tower
- Songwriter: Syd Barrett
- Producer: Norman Smith

Audio
- "Lucifer Sam" on YouTube

"Lucifer Sam" is a song by the English rock band Pink Floyd, featured on the band's debut album The Piper at the Gates of Dawn (1967).

== Music and lyrics ==
The song is built around a descending riff with the dominant instrument being composer Syd Barrett's electric guitar, fed through an echo machine. The resultant sound has been likened to a "sinister" Duane Eddy. This is augmented by bowed bass and increasingly agitated organ and percussion effects.

Although the lyric frequently refers to Lucifer Sam as a cat, some speculation has arisen as to whether this was in fact slang ("a hip cat") for a man, real or imagined, in some type of relationship with Barrett's then-girlfriend, Jenny Spires (referred to in the song as "Jennifer Gentle"). However, Sam was simply Barrett's Siamese cat (and is referred to as such in the first line: "Lucifer Sam, Siam cat"), the track was originally called "Percy the Rat Catcher" during the recording sessions, which took place between April and June 1967.

== Personnel ==
=== Pink Floyd ===
- Syd Barrett – vocals, guitar, slide guitar
- Richard Wright – Farfisa organ, Hammond organ, piano
- Roger Waters – bass guitar, bowed bass
- Nick Mason – drums, maracas, timpani

== Live and cover versions ==
"Lucifer Sam" was only performed live by Pink Floyd in 1967 and featured as an encore during many performances, most notably at the Games for May concert.

Barrett later performed the song with his 1972 band Stars.

Lightning Seeds covered the song as a B-side, and it appeared on their 2006 best of collection.

The track has also been covered by the Black Crowes, Electric Hellfire Club, the Minders, the Flaming Lips, True West, Jay Farrar, Love and Rockets, Shockabilly, the Sadies, the Three O'Clock, MGMT, Spirits in the Sky, Unknown Mortal Orchestra, Obits (with different lyrics, as "Widow of my Dreams"), Cat's Eyes, Bauhaus, Southern Culture on the Skids, The Horrors and Chris & Cosey.

Nick Mason has performed the song live with his band Nick Mason's Saucerful of Secrets. A recording is included on their 2020 live album Live at the Roundhouse.
