= Dark Globe =

Song by Syd Barrett

Song by Syd Barrett

from the album The Madcap Laughs
- Released: 3 January 1970
- Recorded: 12 June 1969; 26 July 1969 (Opel version)
- Genre: Folk
- Length: 2:02; 3:00 (Opel version)
- Label: Harvest (UK); Capitol (US)
- Songwriter: Syd Barrett
- Producers: David Gilmour; Roger Waters

The Madcap Laughs track listing
- 13 tracks Side one: 1. "Terrapin"; 2. "No Good Trying"; 3. "Love You"; 4. "No Man's Land"; 5. "Dark Globe"; 6. "Here I Go"; Side two: 7. "Octopus"; 8. "Golden Hair"; 9. "Long Gone"; 10. "She Took a Long Cold Look"; 11. "Feel"; 12. "If It's In You"; 13. "Late Night"

An Introduction to Syd Barrett track listing
- 18 tracks: 1. "Arnold Layne"; 2. "See Emily Play"; 3. "Apples and Oranges"; 4. "Matilda Mother"; 5. "Chapter 24"; 6. "Bike"; 7. "Terrapin"; 8. "Love You"; 9. "Dark Globe"; 10. "Here I Go"; 11. "Octopus"; 12. "She Took a Long Cool Look"; 13. "If It's In You"; 14. "Baby Lemonade"; 15. "Dominoes"; 16. "Gigolo Aunt"; 17. "Effervescing Elephant"; 18. "Bob Dylan Blues"

"Wouldn't You Miss Me"

Song by Syd Barrett

from the album Opel
- Released: 1988
- Recorded: 26 July 1969
- Genre: Folk
- Length: 3:00
- Label: Harvest (UK); Capitol (US)
- Songwriter: Syd Barrett
- Producers: David Gilmour; Roger Waters

"Dark Globe", also known as "Wouldn't You Miss Me", is a song by Syd Barrett, released on his first solo album, The Madcap Laughs.

== Recording ==
Syd Barrett recorded "Dark Globe" and other songs during a session held on 12 June 1969, with producers David Gilmour and Roger Waters. Despite both Gilmour and Waters' considering the song finished, Barrett recorded the song a third time towards the end of the session. The version recorded at the start of the session was the one released on the finished album. On 26 July 1969 Barrett recorded "Dark Globe" again. This take was titled "Wouldn't You Miss Me" on the recording sheet. The track, along with two others, was mixed on 6 August of the same year.

== Personnel ==
- Syd Barrett – vocals, acoustic guitar
- David Gilmour – producer
- Roger Waters – producer

== Covers ==
"Dark Globe"

Single by David Gilmour
- A-side: "Arnold Layne"
- Released: 26 December 2006
- Genre: Folk
- Length: 2:23
- Label: EMI
- Songwriter: Syd Barrett
- Producer: David Gilmour

David Gilmour singles chronology
"Smile" (2006)	"Dark Globe" (2006)

"Dark Globe" was covered by R.E.M. while the band was touring to support Document and Green. R.E.M. first released the song in 1989 on the single "Orange Crush", and they re-released it in 1993 on the British "collector's edition" of the single for "Everybody Hurts". It was one of four cover versions within R.E.M.'s rare album, Automatic Box. In an interview for the DVD, The Pink Floyd & Syd Barrett Story, Roger Waters recalls visiting backstage with R.E.M. and being warmly welcomed by the band, except for vocalist Michael Stipe. Stipe instead sat in a corner with his back to everyone, ignoring Waters until Stipe performed "Dark Globe" by himself during the encore. Waters said he supposed this to be Stipe's way of saying, "Syd was all right but you're an arsehole." R.E.M.'s rendition was released as a B-side to the original on a marbled brown 7" for Record Store Day on 18 April 2015.

"Dark Globe" has also been covered by the band Placebo. Gene Ween, Soundgarden, and Chris Cornell have all covered the song live.

Pink Floyd guitarist David Gilmour revived the song in live performance during some of his concerts in July 2006, as a tribute to Barrett shortly after he died. A live version was released on a single entitled "Arnold Layne" later that year.
