= Chapter 24 =

Chapter Twenty-Four, Chapter 24, or Chapter XXIV may refer to:

== Music ==
- "Chapter 24" (song), song by Pink Floyd
- Chapter 24 Records, record label

== Television ==
- "Chapter 24" (Eastbound & Down)
- "Chapter 24" (House of Cards)
- "Chapter 24" (Legion)
- "Chapter 24" (Star Wars: Clone Wars), an episode of Star Wars: Clone Wars
- "Chapter 24: The Return", an episode of The Mandalorian
- "Chapter Twenty-Four" (Boston Public)
- "Chapter Twenty-Four: The Hare Moon", an episode of Chilling Adventures of Sabrina
- "Chapter Twenty-Four: The Wrestler", an episode of Riverdale
