= The Peel Session (Syd Barrett album) =

The Peel Sessions

EP by Syd Barrett
- Released: 25 January 1987
- Recorded: 24 February 1970
- Genre: Psychedelic rock
- Length: 12:39
- Label: Strange Fruit SFPS043
- Producer: John Walters

Syd Barrett chronology
Syd Barrett (1974)	The Peel Sessions (1987)	Opel (1988)

Alternative cover
- Syd Barrett: The Peel Session reissue cover

Professional ratings
Review scores
Source	Rating
AllMusic	2/5 stars
The Encyclopedia of Popular Music	3/5 stars
The Rolling Stone Album Guide	3/5 stars
Trouser Press	very favourable

The Peel Session is a collection of recordings by Syd Barrett released on 25 January 1987. This EP contains the five songs he performed for the John Peel Top Gear show, recorded on 24 February 1970 and broadcast shortly after.

== Track listing ==
All songs written by Syd Barrett, except "Two of a Kind", possibly written by Richard Wright. (Note: "Two of a Kind" was credited to Richard Wright on the original Peel Session release, but to Barrett on later releases, including The Best of Syd Barrett: Wouldn't You Miss Me?. Wright reportedly wrote the song but Barrett insisted it was his own composition (and wanted to include it on The Madcap Laughs). When asked about the matter in a 1996 interview, Wright's reply was enigmatic: "Can't answer, I am looking into this.")

No.	Title	Length
1.	"Terrapin"	3:02
2.	"Gigolo Aunt"	3:35
3.	"Baby Lemonade"	2:37
4.	"Effervescing Elephant"	0:57
5.	"Two of a Kind"	2:28
Total length:		12:39

== Personnel ==
- Syd Barrett – acoustic guitar, vocals
- David Gilmour – bass guitar, electric guitar, organ, backing vocals
- Jerry Shirley – percussion

== See also ==
- The Radio One Sessions

== Extra links ==
- The Peel Sessions at Discogs
