= Milky Way (Syd Barrett song) =

Song by Syd Barrett

from the album Opel
- Released: 17 October 1988
- Recorded: 7 June 1970
- Length: 3:07
- Label: Harvest/EMI (UK); Capitol Records (US)
- Songwriter: Syd Barrett
- Producer: David Gilmour

"Milky Way" is a song by Syd Barrett from the outtakes/rarities album Opel. The song was recorded on 7 June 1970, and produced by Barrett's friend and former bandmate David Gilmour. It was one of eight then-unreleased tracks to be released on Opel.
