= Opel (album) =

Compilation album by Syd Barrett
- Released: 17 October 1988
- Recorded: Abbey Road, 14 May 1968 – 17 July 1970
- Genres: Psychedelic folk, psychedelic rock
- Length: 45:53 (original release); 65:05 (Crazy Diamond reissue)
- Labels: Harvest (UK); Capitol (US)
- Producers: Syd Barrett, Peter Jenner, Malcolm Jones, Roger Waters and David Gilmour

Syd Barrett chronology
| Syd Barrett: The Peel Sessions (1987) | Opel (1988) | Octopus: The Best of Syd Barrett (1992) |

Crazy Diamond reissue
- Crazy Diamond reissue cover

Opel is a 1988 album compiled from recordings made by former Pink Floyd frontman Syd Barrett between 1968 (Note: The earliest recorded material being "Lanky (Part One)" and "Golden Hair", recorded mid-May 1968.) and 1970. (Note: The latest recorded material, released on the standard edition of Opel, being "Word Song", the first of three tracks recorded mid-to-late July 1970. On the Crazy Diamond reissue, however, the latest material is "It Is Obvious", the final of three tracks recorded during the last session.) The album is a compilation of unreleased material and alternative takes of recordings from sessions for Barrett's solo albums, The Madcap Laughs and Barrett.

Opel was released in October 1988 on Harvest in the UK, and on Capitol Records in the US. The album was remastered and reissued in 1993, along with Barrett's other albums, The Madcap Laughs and Barrett (both 1970), independently and as part of the Crazy Diamond box set. A newly remastered version was released in 2010.

== Background ==
The album was originally set to include the unreleased Barrett Pink Floyd songs "Scream Thy Last Scream" and "Vegetable Man", which had been remixed for the album by Jones. However, the two songs were pulled by Pink Floyd before Opel was finalised.

While Barrett only released two albums, The Madcap Laughs and Barrett, both in 1970, the existence of unreleased studio work was widely reported. After years of demand from Barrett's considerable fan base, Opel was compiled and released. Barrett personally approved the new release.

== Release and content ==
Professional ratings
Review scores
| Source | Rating |
|---|---|
| AllMusic | 3/5 stars |
| Encyclopedia of Popular Music | 3/5 stars |
| MusicHound Rock | 3/5 |
| The New Rolling Stone Album Guide | 2/5 stars |
| OndaRock | 7/10 |

Opel consists of eight previously unreleased songs and alternative versions of six already released songs. The album was released due to the constant pressure from The Madcap Laughs producer, Malcolm Jones. Despite its positive reviews, it failed to chart. AllMusic reviewer Richie Unterberger said the album was "charming", with the title track, "Swan Lee (Silas Lang)", "Dark Globe" and "Milky Way" as highlights.

Opel (along with The Madcap Laughs and Barrett) was reissued both independently and as part of the Crazy Diamond Barrett box set, A newly remastered version was released in 2010.

== Track listing ==
All songs written by Syd Barrett, except "Golden Hair" (music by Barrett, based on a poem by James Joyce). All track information is taken from the Crazy Diamond version of Opel.

=== Original release ===
Side one
| No. | Title | Notes | Length |
|---|---|---|---|
| 1. | "Opel" | Take 9, recorded 11 April 1969; Produced by Malcolm Jones | 6:26 |
| 2. | "Clowns and Jugglers (Octopus)" | Take 2, recorded 20 July 1968; Produced by Peter Jenner | 3:27 |
| 3. | "Rats" | Demo, recorded 5 June 1970; Produced by David Gilmour | 3:12 |
| 4. | "Golden Hair" | Take 6, recorded 12 June 1969; Produced by Syd Barrett and David Gilmour | 1:44 |
| 5. | "Dolly Rocker" | Take 1, recorded 14 July 1970; Produced by David Gilmour | 3:01 |
| 6. | "Word Song" | Take 1, recorded 17 July 1970; Produced by David Gilmour | 3:19 |
| 7. | "Wined and Dined" | Demo, recorded 5 June 1970; Produced by David Gilmour | 3:03 |

Side two
| No. | Title | Notes | Length |
|---|---|---|---|
| 8. | "Swan Lee (Silas Lang)" | Take 9, recorded 11 April 1969; Take 5, recorded 28 May 1968, overdubs added 8 June 1968; Produced by Peter Jenner; Further overdubs added 25 April 1969; Produced by Malcolm Jones | 3:13 |
| 9. | "Birdie Hop" | Demo, recorded 5 June 1970; Produced by David Gilmour | 2:30 |
| 10. | "Let's Split" | Take 1, recorded 14 July 1970; Produced by David Gilmour | 2:23 |
| 11. | "Lanky (Part One)" | Take 1, recorded 14 May 1968; Produced by Peter Jenner | 5:32 |
| 12. | "Wouldn't You Miss Me (Dark Globe)" | Take 1, recorded 26 July 1969; Produced by David Gilmour and Roger Waters | 3:00 |
| 13. | "Milky Way" | Take 5, recorded 7 June 1970; Produced by David Gilmour | 3:07 |
| 14. | "Golden Hair" (instrumental version) | Take 1, recorded 14 May 1968; Produced by Peter Jenner | 1:56 |
| Total length: | | | 45:53 |

=== 1993 reissue ===
Bonus tracks (19:12)
| No. | Title | Notes | Length |
|---|---|---|---|
| 15. | "Gigolo Aunt" | Take 9, recorded 27 February 1970; Produced by David Gilmour | 4:02 |
| 16. | "It Is Obvious" | Take 3, recorded 17 July 1970; Electric guitar and vocal; Produced by David Gilmour | 3:44 |
| 17. | "It Is Obvious" | Take 5, recorded 17 July 1970; Acoustic guitar and vocal; Produced by David Gilmour | 3:06 |
| 18. | "Clowns and Jugglers (Octopus)" | Take 1, recorded 20 July 1968; Produced by Pete Jenner | 3:33 |
| 19. | "Late Night" (instrumental) | Take 2, recorded 28 May 1968; Produced by Pete Jenner | 3:19 |
| 20. | "Effervescing Elephant" | Take 2, recorded 14 July 1970; Produced by David Gilmour | 1:28 |
| Total length: | | | 65:05 |

== Personnel ==
- Syd Barrett – guitar, vocals, producer
- David Gilmour – producer
- Peter Jenner – producer
- Malcolm Jones – producer
- Roger Waters – producer
- Gareth Cousins – mix engineer

Guest musicians on "Clowns and Jugglers":

- Mike Ratledge – organ
- Robert Wyatt – drums
- Hugh Hopper – bass
