= Terrapin (song) =

Song by Syd Barrett

from the album The Madcap Laughs
- Released: 3 January 1970
- Recorded: 11 & 26 April 1969
- Genre: Soft rock; psychedelia
- Length: 5:04
- Label: Harvest/EMI (UK); Capitol (US)
- Songwriter: Syd Barrett
- Producer: Malcolm Jones

The Madcap Laughs track listing
- 13 tracks Side one: 1. "Terrapin"; 2. "No Good Trying"; 3. "Love You"; 4. "No Man's Land"; 5. "Dark Globe"; 6. "Here I Go"; Side two: 7. "Octopus"; 8. "Golden Hair"; 9. "Long Gone"; 10. "She Took a Long Cold Look"; 11. "Feel"; 12. "If It's In You"; 13. "Late Night"

An Introduction to Syd Barrett track listing
- 18 tracks: 1. "Arnold Layne"; 2. "See Emily Play"; 3. "Apples and Oranges"; 4. "Matilda Mother"; 5. "Chapter 24"; 6. "Bike"; 7. "Terrapin"; 8. "Love You"; 9. "Dark Globe"; 10. "Here I Go"; 11. "Octopus"; 12. "She Took a Long Cool Look"; 13. "If It's In You"; 14. "Baby Lemonade"; 15. "Dominoes"; 16. "Gigolo Aunt"; 17. "Effervescing Elephant"; 18. "Bob Dylan Blues"

"Terrapin" is the opening song on Syd Barrett's first solo album The Madcap Laughs. Its arrangement is sparse, like much of the album, and features only acoustic and electric guitar accompaniment to the vocals. This song, along with "Maisie" and "Bob Dylan Blues"; reflected Barrett's early interest in the blues. Iggy the Eskimo, one of Barrett's acquaintances, had called the song "quite catchy".

The song reappeared on the Harvest Records compilation Picnic – A Breath of Fresh Air and is The Madcap Laughs' sole representative on The Peel Session.

The Syd Barrett Appreciation Society titled its official magazine Terrapin (published 1972–1976), in tribute to the song.

== Recording ==
Preparing Madcap, in April 1969, Barrett played demo tapes of songs to producer Malcolm Jones, at the latter's request. After the playbacks, Barrett performed, on guitar, several tracks for Jones, one being "Terrapin". The album version was recorded in just one take on 11 April. The lead guitar was overdubbed on 26 April.

== Personnel ==
- Syd Barrett – vocals, acoustic and electric guitars
- Malcolm Jones – producer

== Covers ==
The song has been covered by The Smashing Pumpkins, Marc and the Mambas, The King Khan and BBQ Show, Phish, and David Gilmour, who featured the song on the DVD David Gilmour in Concert. Red Hot Chili Peppers guitarist John Frusciante performed the song during the bands Unlimited Love Tour.

Gilmour performed the song at 1996's "A Day for Tibet" and 2001's Meltdown events. "Many of his songs are just too personal…" Gilmour observed. "Or too incomprehensible in some ways. With some of them it's hard to feel confident about inhabiting the song. I'm pretty sure I know where 'Terrapin' is coming from. It's that underwater vibe. Although it is slightly off-the-wall lyrically."
