= Octopus (Syd Barrett song) =

- French picture sleeve

Single by Syd Barrett

from the album The Madcap Laughs
- B-side: "Golden Hair"
- Released: 14 November 1969
- Recorded: May 1968; 12 & 13 June 1969; 20 July 1968 (Opel version)
- Genre: Psychedelic rock
- Length: 3:47 (single and Madcap version); 3:27 (Opel version)
- Label: Harvest
- Songwriter: Syd Barrett
- Producers: Syd Barrett and David Gilmour

Syd Barrett singles chronology
| "Octopus" (1969) | "Wouldn't You Miss Me" (1988) |

The Madcap Laughs track listing
- 13 tracks Side one: 1. "Terrapin"; 2. "No Good Trying"; 3. "Love You"; 4. "No Man's Land"; 5. "Dark Globe"; 6. "Here I Go"; Side two: 7. "Octopus"; 8. "Golden Hair"; 9. "Long Gone"; 10. "She Took a Long Cold Look"; 11. "Feel"; 12. "If It's In You"; 13. "Late Night"

An Introduction to Syd Barrett track listing
- 18 tracks: 1. "Arnold Layne"; 2. "See Emily Play"; 3. "Apples and Oranges"; 4. "Matilda Mother"; 5. "Chapter 24"; 6. "Bike"; 7. "Terrapin"; 8. "Love You"; 9. "Dark Globe"; 10. "Here I Go"; 11. "Octopus"; 12. "She Took a Long Cool Look"; 13. "If It's In You"; 14. "Baby Lemonade"; 15. "Dominoes"; 16. "Gigolo Aunt"; 17. "Effervescing Elephant"; 18. "Bob Dylan Blues"

Official video
- "Octopus" (2001 Remaster) on YouTube

"Octopus" (originally recorded as "Clowns and Jugglers" and also known as "The Madcap Laughs") is a song by Syd Barrett, released as his debut solo single in November 1969. In January 1970, it appeared on his first solo album The Madcap Laughs.

== Writing ==
Barrett reflected on the song's writing:

I carried that about in my head for about six months before I actually wrote it so maybe that's why it came out so well. The idea was like those number songs like Green Grow the Rushes, O where you have, say, twelve lines each related to the next and an overall theme. It's like a fool-proof combination of lyrics, really, and then the chorus comes in and changes the tempo but holds the whole thing together.

"Octopus" directly quotes a section from "Rilloby-Rill" by English poet Sir Henry Newbolt (1862–1938). The song also features a variety of other influences.

== Recording ==
Syd Barrett left Pink Floyd in April 1968, along with their manager Peter Jenner. Jenner led Barrett into EMI Studios to record some tracks in May, that would later be released on Barrett's first solo album. During the May sessions, Jenner failed to record, properly, any vocals at all for several tracks, including "Clown and Jugglers". Sessions stopped once Barrett was in psychiatric care, apparently after a drive around Britain in his Mini.

After New Year 1969, a somewhat recovered Barrett decided upon returning to a musical career; Barrett contacted EMI, and was passed on to Malcolm Jones, the then-head of EMI's new prog rock label, Harvest. Barrett wanted to recover the Jenner-produced sessions recordings; several tracks, including "Clowns and Jugglers", were improved upon.

An early version of the song, recorded with the band Soft Machine, was released on the Barrett rarities album Opel (1988) under the title "Clowns and Jugglers". The 1993 re-releases of The Madcap Laughs and Opel contain alternate versions of "Octopus" and "Clowns and Jugglers" respectively, as bonus tracks.

== Release ==
The album's title came about as a result of co-producer David Gilmour mishearing a line from this song ("Well, the mad cat laughed at the man on the border..." - although the word "madcap" does figure in another of the song's lyrics, "To a madcap galloping chase"). "Octopus" is known for being Barrett's only single as a solo artist. It was released on 14 November 1969, two months before the release of The Madcap Laughs. In France, the single gained a picture sleeve, which had the drawing of an octopus on it. A very scarce exemplar of this single has been auctioned for 10,500 euros on 19 June 2016 (Lot 284) during an 8000 vinyl records sale organized by the "Discothèque de Radio France".

It was included on the multi-artist Harvest compilation A Breath of Fresh Air – A Harvest Records Anthology 1969–1974 in 2007. The song was also included on the 2010 compilation An Introduction to Syd Barrett. In 2011, as part of Record Store Day Black Friday, a limited edition tin-set featuring a replica of the "Octopus" single yellow vinyl, with a 120-page book of photos of Barrett by photographer, Mick Rock, was released in the US.

== Personnel ==
- Syd Barrett – vocals, acoustic and electric guitars, producer
- David Gilmour – bass guitar, drums, co-producer
