= Bike (song) =

Song by Pink Floyd

Song by Pink Floyd

from the album The Piper at the Gates of Dawn
- Released: 5 August 1967
- Recorded: 21 May 1967
- Genre: Psychedelic pop; psychedelic rock
- Length: 3:21
- Label: EMI Columbia (UK)
- Songwriter: Syd Barrett
- Producer: Norman Smith

Official audio
- "Bike" on YouTube

"Bike" is a song by the English rock band Pink Floyd, which is the final track featured on their debut studio album, The Piper at the Gates of Dawn (1967).

== Background and lyrics ==
In the song, Syd Barrett's lyrical subject shows a girl his bike (which he borrowed), a cloak, a homeless and aging mouse that he calls Gerald, and a clan of gingerbread men, because she "fits in with [his] world". With each repetition of the chorus, a sudden percussive noise is heard similar to the firing of two gunshots. The heavy reverb from these bangs immediately cuts out when the following verse begins. Towards the end of the song, he offers to take her into a "room of musical tunes". The final verse is followed by an instrumental section that is a piece of musique concrète: a noisy collage of oscillators, clocks, gongs, bells, a violin, and other sounds edited with tape techniques, apparently the "other room" spoken of in the song and giving the impression of the turning gears of a bicycle. The ending of the song fades out with a tape loop of the band laughing which was then sped up and reversed. The song was written for Barrett's then girlfriend, Jenny Spires. She is also mentioned as "Jennifer Gentle" in the song "Lucifer Sam", which is also on The Piper at the Gates of Dawn.

== Other album appearances ==
The song also appears on two Pink Floyd compilation albums: Relics (1971) and Echoes: The Best of Pink Floyd (2001); it serves as the closing track on both albums.

== Cover versions ==
- P-Model covered the song for their 1984 album Another Game. The lyrics were adapted by bandleader Susumu Hirasawa, who focused on Japanese lyrics that sounded similar to the English version rather than a direct translation, turning it into a parodic version. It features a toy piano sound played by a Yamaha DX7.
- The Hotrats covered the song on their 2009 album Turn Ons.
- Phish has performed this song at (to date, Nov. 2023) 42 of their shows, often with drummer Jon Fishman playing a baby blue Electrolux vacuum cleaner.
- The song was played by Nick Mason's Saucerful of Secrets. A recording is included on their 2020 live album Live at the Roundhouse. "The interesting thing is how complex Syd's writing was," Mason observed. "I think we'd all agree that one of the most challenging songs is 'Bike', which has a very curious feel."

== Personnel ==
- Syd Barrett – electric guitars, double-tracked lead vocals, laughing, tape effects
- Richard Wright – piano, harmonium, tack piano, celesta, violin, double-tracked backing vocals, laughing, tape effects
- Roger Waters – bass guitar, laughing, tape effects
- Nick Mason – drums, timpani, chimes, percussion, laughing, tape effects
