= Matilda Mother =

Song by Pink Floyd

from the album The Piper at the Gates of Dawn
- Released: 5 August 1967
- Recorded: 21 February 1967
- Genre: Psychedelic rock; baroque pop
- Length: 3:08
- Label: EMI Columbia (UK); Tower (US)
- Songwriter: Syd Barrett
- Producer: Norman Smith

"Matilda Mother" is a song by the English rock band Pink Floyd, featured on their 1967 debut album, The Piper at the Gates of Dawn. Written by Syd Barrett, it is sung mostly by Richard Wright with Barrett joining in on choruses and singing the whole last verse. It was the first song recorded for the album.

== Lyrics and music ==
The lyrics quote fragments of fairy tales as read from a book to the singer by his mother ("read[ing] the scribbly black", referring to writing in a book as a child sees it), and in the chorus he implores her to "tell me more". "Matilda Mother" represents a common theme in Barrett's work: his nostalgia for childhood and awareness that it could not be regained.

The song begins with a bass and organ introduction in which Roger Waters repeatedly plays the B on the 16th fret of the G-string by varying the lower note from D to F# on the D string. Unlike many older beat and pop songs, the guitar rarely plays chords, and most unusually for Western music, Wright provides an organ solo in the F# Phrygian dominant scale with a natural sixth instead of its typical flatted counterpart. The song ends with a simple E mixolydian-based waltz with wordless vocal harmonies of Wright and Barrett.

Barrett originally wrote the song around verses from Hilaire Belloc's Cautionary Tales, in which a series of naughty children, including Matilda, receive their (often gruesome) comeuppance. He was forced to rewrite and re-record the track when Belloc's estate unexpectedly denied permission to use these lyrics. The original version was released on An Introduction to Syd Barrett in 2010.

== Later release ==
On the Masters of Rock compilation album, the song was misspelled "Mathilda Mother".

== Personnel ==
- Syd Barrett – electric guitars, double-tracked lead vocals (choruses, bridge and final verse)
- Richard Wright – Hammond organ, Farfisa organ, double-tracked lead vocals (first two verses and choruses)
- Roger Waters – bass guitar
- Nick Mason – drums

== Alternative versions ==
A previously unreleased alternative version was released in a 40th anniversary reissue of The Piper at the Gates of Dawn; parts of this version's lyrics are also from Belloc's Cautionary Tales, i.e. Jim and Henry King, whereas the chorus is the same as in the standard version.

A different, stereo remix of the same alternative version was also released on the Barrett compilation, An Introduction to Syd Barrett in 2010. An extended version of this 2010 mix appeared in the Pink Floyd compilation box set The Early Years 1965–1972, which also contains two live recordings of the song.
