= The Madcap Laughs =

Studio album by Syd Barrett
- Released: 2 January 1970
- Recorded: 28 May 1968 – 5 August 1969
- Studios: EMI, London
- Genres: Psychedelic folk; folk rock; experimental rock; psychedelic rock; avant-pop
- Length: 37:41
- Label: Harvest
- Producers: Syd Barrett; Peter Jenner; Malcolm Jones; David Gilmour; Roger Waters

Syd Barrett chronology
The Madcap Laughs (1970)	Barrett (1970)

Crazy Diamond reissue

Singles from The Madcap Laughs
- 1. "Octopus" / "Golden Hair" Released: 14 November 1969

The Madcap Laughs is the debut solo album by the English singer-songwriter Syd Barrett. It was recorded after Barrett had left Pink Floyd in April 1968. The album had a lengthy recording history, with work beginning in May 1968, but the bulk of the sessions taking place between April and July 1969, for which five different producers were credited –including Barrett himself, Peter Jenner (1968 sessions), Malcolm Jones (early-to-mid-1969 sessions), and fellow Pink Floyd members David Gilmour and Roger Waters (mid-1969 sessions). Among the guest musicians are Willie Wilson from Gilmour's old band Jokers Wild and several members of Soft Machine.

The Madcap Laughs, released in January 1970 on Harvest in the UK but not released in the US until 1974, enjoyed limited commercial success on release, reaching number 40 on the UK's official albums chart. It was re-released in 1974 as part of Syd Barrett (which contained The Madcap Laughs and Barrett), which saw the first US issue of the two LPs. The album was remastered and reissued in 1993, along with Barrett's other albums, Barrett (1970) and Opel (1988), independently and as part of the Crazy Diamond box set. A newly remastered version was released in 2010.

== Background ==
In the second half of 1967 and through to early 1968, when still part of Pink Floyd, Barrett's behaviour became increasingly erratic and unpredictable. Many report having seen him on stage with the group during this period, strumming on one chord through an entire concert or not playing at all. In August 1967, Pink Floyd were forced to cancel their appearance at the prestigious National Jazz and Blues Festival, informing the music press that Barrett was suffering from nervous exhaustion. Band manager Peter Jenner and bassist Roger Waters arranged for Barrett to see a psychiatrist (an appointment he failed to attend), while a stay on the Spanish island of Formentera with Sam Hutt, a doctor well established in the underground music scene, led to no visible improvement in Barrett's behaviour. A few dates in September were followed by the band's first tour of the United States. At this point, Barrett's condition grew steadily worse. At a show at The Fillmore in San Francisco, during a performance of "Interstellar Overdrive", Barrett slowly detuned his guitar; the audience seemed to enjoy such antics, unaware of the rest of the band's consternation. Sometime in October, Jenner transferred tapes of "In the Beechwoods", two takes of "Vegetable Man", and a 5-minute backing track called "No Title", which Jenner hoped Barrett would finish eventually.

Around Christmas 1967, guitarist David Gilmour, an old friend of Barrett's from Cambridge, was asked by the other members of Pink Floyd to join as a second guitarist, initially not to replace Barrett, but cover for him, because his unpredictable behaviour prevented him from performing. For several shows Gilmour sang and played guitar while Barrett wandered around on stage, every now and then deciding to join in playing guitar and singing. Waters and fellow band members keyboardist Richard Wright and drummer Nick Mason soon grew weary of Barrett's on-stage antics and, on 26 January 1968, when Waters was driving his bandmates from London to a show at Southampton University, they all agreed to go without Barrett: according to Gilmour's recollection, one person asked, "Shall we pick Syd up?" and another said, "Let's not bother." Since Barrett had written or co-written 10 of the 11 songs on their debut album, The Piper at the Gates of Dawn, as well as the band's three singles up to this point, the original plan was to keep him in the group as a non-touring member − in a similar arrangement to what the Beach Boys had done with Brian Wilson − but this soon proved to be unworkable. At his last rehearsal with the band, he presented a new song entitled "Have You Got It Yet?", which proved to be deliberately unplayable as the others attempted to join in, until they realised the joke of the title. On 6 April, the group officially announced that Barrett was no longer a member of Pink Floyd. Upon leaving the band, Barrett said to Melody Maker: "I suppose it was really just a matter of being a little offhand about things".

== Recording ==
=== Peter Jenner sessions ===
After Barrett left Pink Floyd in April 1968, Peter Jenner and Andrew King, from the band's management, followed suit. Nick Mason later commented on Jenner & King leaving with Barrett many years later: "Peter and Andrew clearly felt that Syd was the creative centre of the band, a reasonable point of view given our track record up until that point. Consequently, they decided to represent him rather than us." In May, Jenner led Barrett into EMI Studios (now Abbey Road Studios), on Abbey Road in northwest London, to record some solo material, only part of which would later appear on The Madcap Laughs. Jenner thought Barrett would like to finish the tracks that Jenner transferred the previous October; Barrett on the other hand, had other plans. During these first, tentative sessions, Jenner failed to properly record any vocals at all for the tracks "Golden Hair", (Note: This version originally closed the standard edition of Opel.) "Late Night", "Clowns and Jugglers" (later retitled "Octopus"), (Note: The first take, a false start, and the second take of "Octopus" was released on the 1993 Crazy Diamond reissue of The Madcap Laughs. An early version of "Clowns and Jugglers", involving military-style drumming and organ overdubs was included on the standard version of Opel, while a stripped-down version is included on the Crazy Diamond reissue of Opel.) "Silas Lang", (Note: Titled "Silas Lang" on the recording sheet, later retitled to "Swan Lee".) or "Lanky (Parts One and Two)". After recording had resumed in June and July, progress continued on these tracks, especially "Swan Lee", and a new, improved version of "Clowns and Jugglers" was taped at this point also. Barrett wouldn't commit to recording the track "Rhamadam" (sic) to tape properly, however.

Although Jenner claims he got on well with the singer, he would also state that the 1968 sessions had not gone smoothly, admitting: "I had seriously underestimated the difficulties of working with him ..." Shortly after the July dates, Barrett abruptly stopped recording, breaking up with girlfriend Lindsay Corner and then going off on a drive around Britain in his Mini; he ended up in psychiatric care in Cambridge.

By the start of 1969, a somewhat recovered Barrett decided to return to his musical career and revisit the Jenner-produced recordings. He contacted EMI, and was passed on to Malcolm Jones, then-head of EMI's new prog rock label, Harvest. After both Jenner and Norman Smith, Pink Floyd's producer at the time, declined to work on the album, Jones agreed to take on the role.

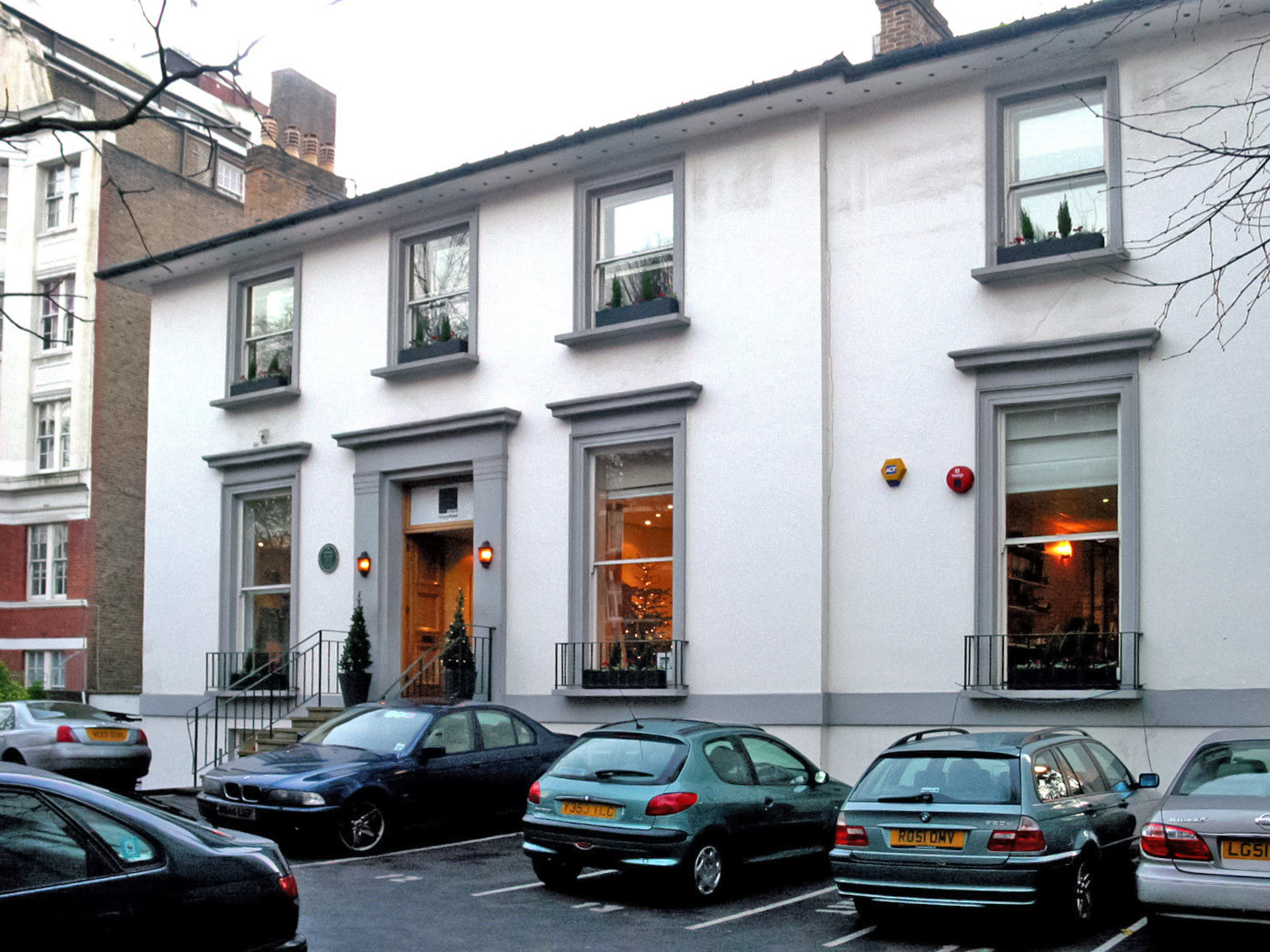
Recording took place at EMI Studios (now Abbey Road Studios)

=== Malcolm Jones sessions ===
Jones had little difficulty in persuading his boss, Roy Featherstone, and Ron White, authoriser of EMI recordings, to allow Barrett to record with the company again. In April 1969, the young executive took over the project and Barrett began working on newer material, while reworking the 1968 recordings. Jones would later comment that the sessions with Barrett had gone well: "Syd was in a great mood, and in fine form, a stark contrast to the rumours and stories I'd been fed." Jones also explained the rationale behind EMI letting Barrett record again: "What was decided was to see what was the strength of Syd's new material, and plan accordingly. If it worked, then, O.K. we'd do an album. If not, we'd call it a day ..." In a meeting at Barrett's flat in Earls Court, unsure of Jenner's production technique, Jones asked to hear some of the previous year's tapes; Barrett played him "Swan Lee", "Late Night", "Rhamadam", "Lanky (Parts One and Two)" and "Golden Hair". Of these, "Swan Lee" had no vocals, but Jones saw potential in the song; "Late Night" did have vocals and, Jones remarked, "a certain charm"; while "Golden Hair" was "great". After the playbacks, Barrett performed several songs on guitar for Jones: "Opel" and "Clowns and Jugglers" (both attempted during the sessions with Peter Jenner), and the newly written "Terrapin" and "Love You".

The Jones-produced sessions commenced on 10 April 1969 at EMI's Studio 3, with that day being dedicated to going through the 1968 tapes again to see what could be improved upon. The first track to be worked on was "Swan Lee", which received vocal overdubs and a new guitar track, and several ideas for "Clowns and Jugglers" were considered; Barrett and Jones both felt that the results were superior to the previous versions. The following day, in about five hours, Barrett recorded vocal and guitar tracks for four recently recorded songs, starting with "Opel", (Note: Despite the "Opel" being almost complete and better produced, Gilmour and Waters decided to leave the track off Madcap.) and two old ones. Barrett and his new producer were in agreement that "Opel" was among the best of the new recordings at this time; only two complete takes of the song were taped, though, after multiple false starts. The next song attempted was "Love You", the first take of which featured a faster tempo than the officially released take 2. After "Love You", they recorded "It's No Good Trying", which was similarly completed in just a few takes. Barrett was in "great form, and very happy", Jones recalled, and "very together". During the lunch break that day, they talked about improving some of the other songs from the Jenner sessions, particularly "Golden Hair" and "Late Night", the last of which was just a backing track at this point. After returning to the studio, they worked on "Terrapin", with Barrett requiring just a single take, and added slide guitar and vocals to "Late Night".

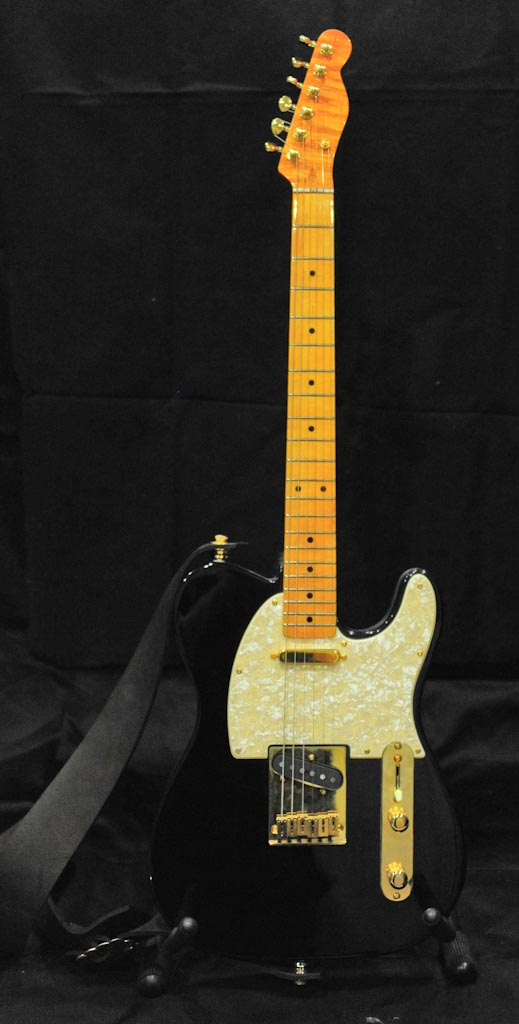
Barrett used a Fender Telecaster, similar to this one, for recording rhythm guitar on the album

The following session took place on 17 April, in Studio 2 at EMI. Jones arrived there to find that Barrett had brought in friends of his as support musicians: Jerry Shirley, drummer with Humble Pie, and Willie Wilson, Jokers Wild's drummer, although for this occasion he was playing bass. The problem with this new set-up, though, was that the songs were recorded as Barrett played them live in the studio; on the released versions, a number of them have false starts and commentaries from Barrett. The first track Barrett and his fellow musicians worked on was "No Man's Land", after Barrett had played through the song several times, to allow Shirley and Wilson to pick up the segments. Once the rehearsal was through, they went for a take, to check how the band sounded and to test the equipment from within the control room. After these tests, the band recorded three takes, the last of which became the master take for "No Man's Land"; the bass, however, was re-recorded at a later date. Playing along with Barrett wasn't easy, according to Jones: "It was a case of following him, not playing with him. They were seeing and then playing so they were always a note behind ..." Shirley said of Barrett: "He gave the impression he knew something you didn't. He had this music sort of giggle ..."

Next, they recorded a song that Barrett had written in a few minutes, "Here I Go", which required no overdubs at all. This session for "No Man's Land" and "Here I Go" lasted just three hours. When asked if he had any new songs for the following week's session, on 23 April, Barrett replied that he had "a weird idea I want to try out" and that other musicians would not be required. Afterwards, Barrett mentioned that he was interested in revisiting one of the Jenner tracks − "Rhamadam". On the morning of the 23rd, Barrett arrived at the studio with a cassette player, on which he had recorded motorbike sounds; these, he told Jones, were "all ready to [be] put onto the 'Rhamadam' four track". The producer described the sound quality as "terrible", an opinion that was confirmed once Barrett's player had been hooked up to a 4-track machine. Instead it was decided that Barrett should source the motorbike sounds from EMI's large sound effects library. The selection process took up to an hour, at which point Jones started to lose faith in Barrett. Later on, Barrett changed his mind and abandoned the idea.

The session on 25 April was almost cancelled, due to Jones becoming ill from colitis. Beforehand, it had been agreed that this session would be dedicated to transferring their previously recorded, 4-track recordings onto Studio 3's newer 8-track machine, for further overdubs in later sessions. At Jones' suggestion, and despite warnings the producer had received that Barrett should not be in the studio unaccompanied, Barrett went in on his own to carry out the mixing. It had been decided that nearly all of the tracks that were recorded up to that point needed further overdubbing except for "No Man's Land" and "Here I Go". At this point, Barrett considered placing "Opel" on the album, Jones calls it among Barrett's "best and most haunting" songs. On the session for 3 May, three tracks on the album were overdubbed by Robert Wyatt, Hugh Hopper and Mike Ratledge, all members of the band Soft Machine: The three songs were "Love You", (now dropping "It's") "No Good Trying", and "Clowns and Jugglers". (Note: The version of "Clowns and Jugglers" that was overdubbed, was the first version that Jones and Barrett had worked on during their first session together.) Even after the Soft Machine members added overdubs to "Clowns and Jugglers", Barrett wished to add bass and drums to it. (Note: Gilmour and Waters may have heard the Soft Machine version of "Clowns and Jugglers", which may have been the reason to why they later re-made it.)

Robert Wyatt had said that the musicians would ask "What key is that in, Syd?", to which Barrett would simply reply "Yeah" or "That's funny". Wyatt had also offered the following comments on the sessions: "Working with Syd Barrett's a piece of cake, I think. I found him courteous and friendly. I can't think of anything wrong with him. I really liked his songs. I liked them musically, I liked them lyrically, and I liked the way he sang them. [...] I just think that not everybody fits into the business. I know from personal experience, it's not that easy." During this time, Barrett also played guitar on the sessions for Soft Machine founder Kevin Ayers' debut LP, Joy of a Toy, although his performance on "Religious Experience" was not released until the album was reissued in 2003. The next day's session had Barrett adding backwards guitar to "No Good Trying", and lead to "Terrapin" and "No Man's Land". It was around this time that Jones' involvement came to an end – during these last few sessions, Gilmour had started taking an interest in how Barrett was getting along with his album. Although Barrett had told his flatmate that he was going off "for an afternoon drive", he instead followed Pink Floyd out to Ibiza. During the trip, he asked David Gilmour for his help on the album, and, at the end of May, Malcolm Jones abandoned his production responsibilities.

=== David Gilmour and Roger Waters sessions ===
In his book The Making of the Madcap Laughs, Jones states that "when Dave came to me and said that Syd wanted him and Roger to do the remaining parts of the album, I acquiesced". Roger Waters and David Gilmour were in the process of completing Pink Floyd's Ummagumma album when they got involved with The Madcap Laughs that July and helped Barrett finish his album − "in a two-day sprint", according to Pink Floyd biographer Rick Sanders. "We had very little time," Gilmour recalled in a May 2003 interview. "Syd was very difficult, we got that very frustrated feeling: Look, it's your fucking career, mate. Why don't you get your finger out and do something? The guy was in trouble, and was a close friend for many years before then, so it really was the least one could do."

In a different interview Gilmour expanded further on the rush to complete the album: “We were led to believe the project was going to be shelved. We were told that EMI had spent too much money on it and it was a long way from completion. An extension was negotiated on the basis that we get it finished in double-quick time. That meant not spending money. The fact that we [•••] were busy and Abbey Road’s other bookings both conspired to make the time available very short. Decisions had to be made.”

After the first session with new producers Gilmour and Waters, on 12 June, they had remade "Clowns and Jugglers" into "Octopus", from the Soft Machine's overdubbed version; then, they re-recorded "Golden Hair", (Note: 11 takes were recorded for both new versions of "Octopus" and "Golden Hair".) and recorded "Long Gone" (Note: Not finishing it in this session, it was attempted and finished at a later date.) and "Dark Globe". (Note: After only recording two takes of "Dark Globe", it was deemed finished, however, by the end of the session they recorded a third take. Although the version recorded earlier in the session was issued instead.) As the following day's session was dedicated to overdubbing "Octopus", this became Barrett's final session for over a month, due to a temporary halt while Gilmour and Waters mixed Ummagumma, to Barrett's dismay, and a Floyd tour in the Netherlands. However, towards the end of July, on the 26th, they managed to record "She Took a Long Cold Look at Me", (Note: Jones' reaction to this version was that of disappointment.) "Feel", "If It's in You", another version of "Long Gone", (Note: This later version of "Long Gone" became the album master.) an attempt at a re-make of "Dark Globe", (Note: For this session, "Dark Globe" was titled "Wouldn't You Miss Me" on the recording sheet.) and even a medley of "She Took" / "Feel" / "If It's in You". Barrett would not allow the musicians to rehearse or to re-record their overdubs, insisting that they sounded fine. After several months of intermittent recording, the album was finally deemed complete. After the final recording sessions for the album had been completed, Gilmour and Waters mixed not just the tracks they had produced, but also the Jones tracks, in a matter of two days. (Note: The Gilmour–Waters-produced tracks were mixed first by Gilmour and Waters, while the Jones-produced tracks for mixed by Gilmour alone on 16 September.) Five tracks were mixed on 5 August: "Long Gone", "She Took", "Feel", "If It's in You", and "Octopus". The following day, three tracks, "Golden Hair", "Dark Globe", and "Terrapin", were mixed in just three hours. The track order was sequenced by Barrett and Gilmour on 6 October. (Note: According to Jones, Barrett was "pissed off", with the delay, as was Jones himself.)

== Cover artwork ==
For the album cover, Barrett painted the floor of his bedroom in Wetherby Mansions orange and purple. Helping him with painting was an acquaintance of Barrett, Evelyn Rose, better known by the misnomers "Iggy the Eskimo" and "Iggy the Inuit". Rose appears in the nude on the back of the LP sleeve (and in the booklet of the CD reissue). Photographer Mick Rock said: "When I arrived for The Madcap Laughs photo session, Syd was still in his underpants when he opened the door. He'd totally forgotten about the session and fell about laughing. His lady friend of two weeks, 'Iggy the Eskimo' was naked in the kitchen making coffee. She didn't mind either. They both laughed a lot and it was a magical session."

Iggy met Barrett in March 1969, through Barrett's then-girlfriend, Jenny Spires. Barrett had moved into Wetherby Mansions, and Jenny took Iggy there one evening. Iggy stayed on at the flat when Jenny left for The States a couple of weeks later. Iggy didn't know who Barrett was or that he was previously in Pink Floyd. Iggy heard Barrett play several songs that would later appear on the album, one being "Terrapin", which she called "quite catchy". In October 2010 she was interviewed, revealing that her name was Evelyn. The album sleeve was designed by Storm Thorgerson and Aubrey Powell of Hipgnosis. The original album credited no musicians, except for Barrett and producers Gilmour, Waters, and Jones. (Note: Back in the 60s and 70s, labels were being resistant to letting their stars appear on other rival label releases. In the case of Madcap, Jones thought this gained it "an air of mystery".) Later issues do feature musician credits. On the original release, track 10 is listed as "She Took a Long Cold Look", although on the 2010 remaster the track is re-titled to "She Took a Long Cool Look", in similar vein to An Introduction to Syd Barrett.

== Release, reception, and aftermath ==
Professional ratings
Review scores
Source	Rating
AllMusic	4.5/5 stars
The Encyclopedia of Popular Music	3/5 stars
Entertainment Weekly	B−
The Great Rock Discography	8/10
MusicHound Rock	3.5/5 stars
Music Story	5/5 stars
The New Rolling Stone Album Guide	3/5 stars
OndaRock	8/10
Spin Alternative Record Guide	9/10

"Octopus" was released as a single in November 1969 (Note: UK EMI Harvest HAR 5009) and The Madcap Laughs followed on 2 January 1970. (Note: At Jones' choice, it was backed by the Gilmour–Waters-produced version of "Golden Hair" as the b-side.) The album was released by Harvest in the UK. (Note: UK EMI Harvest SHVL 765) It sold 6,000 copies in the first few months and reached number 40 in the UK and was fairly well-reviewed by music critics. Village Voice critic Robert Christgau, reviewing the 1974 two-LP set which included The Madcap Laughs, praised some of the music as "funny, charming, catchy – whimsy at its best," opining that "I love most of side one, especially 'Terrapin' and 'Here I Go,'" but some of the other material was "worthy of the wimp-turned-acid-casualty Barrett is." Initial sales and reaction were deemed sufficient by EMI to sanction a second solo album.

Upon release, Gilmour said: "Perhaps we were trying to show what Syd was really like. But perhaps we were trying to punish him ..." Barrett stated that "It's quite nice but I'd be very surprised if it did anything. If I were to drop dead, I don't think it would stand as my last statement." Waters was more optimistic, declaring Barrett a "genius". Malcolm Jones was shocked by what he perceived as the substandard musicianship on the Gilmour and Waters-produced songs, however: "I felt angry. It's like dirty linen in public and very unnecessary and unkind ..." Barrett later said of the album: "I liked what came out, only it was released far too long after it was done. I wanted it to be a whole thing that people would listen to all the way through with everything related and balanced, the tempos and moods offsetting each other, and I hope that's what it sounds like." In a bid to increase sales, Jones wrote a letter to music magazine, Melody Maker, under an alternate name, writing how great the album was.

On 6 June 1970, Barrett gave his one and only solo performance, held at the Kensington Olympia, backed by Gilmour and Shirley. They played "Terrapin", "Gigolo Aunt", "Effervescing Elephant", and "Octopus". From the start of the performance up to (but not including) "Octopus", the vocals were near-inaudible. Barrett baffled the audience (and Gilmour and Shirley) when he abruptly took off his guitar after the fourth number and walked off stage. The performance has been bootlegged.

== Chart performance ==
The Madcap Laughs chart performance
Month	Year	Chart	Position
Jan	1970	[UK Official Charts]	40

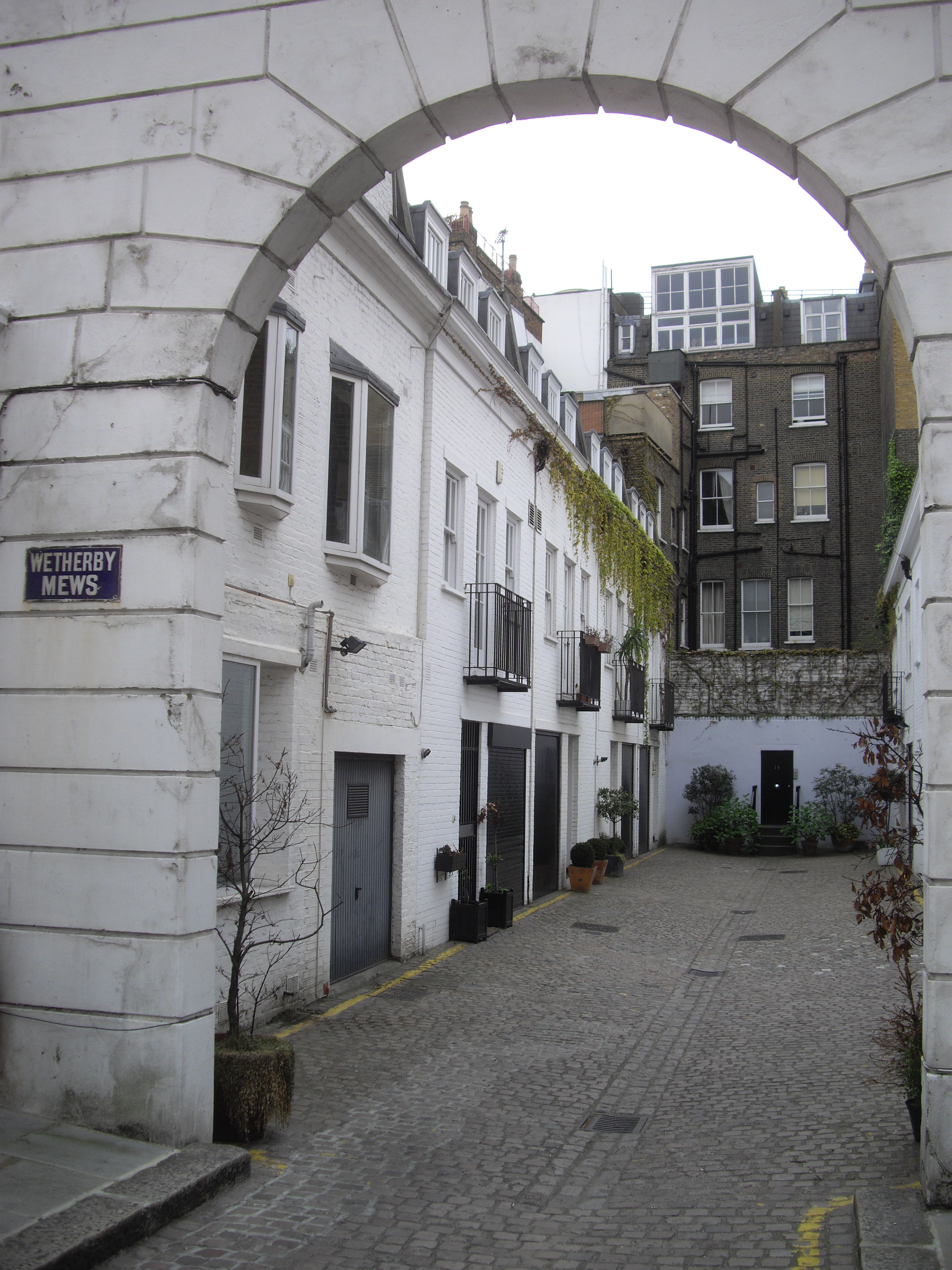
The photograph used on the cover for the album was taken in Barrett's flat in Wetherby Mansions at Earl's Court Square in London

=== Accolades ===
Source	Country	Accolade	Year	Rank
Neil Strauss	US	The 100 Most Influential Alternative Albums	1993	*
Mojo	UK	Top 50 Eccentric Albums of All Time	2003	*
Rolling Stone	Germany	The 500 Best Albums of All Time	2004	487
Blow Up	Italy	600 Essential Albums	2005	*
The Guardian	UK	1000 Albums to Hear Before You Die	2007	*
Robert Dimery	UK	1001 Albums You Must Hear Before You Die	2005	*
NME	UK	The 10 Best Albums Recorded at Abbey Road	2015	7
Uncut	UK	200 Greatest Albums of All Time	2016	130

* designates unordered lists.

=== Legacy ===
Several notable musicians and bands have listed The Madcap Laughs as one of their favourite albums of all time: they include David Bowie, Genesis P-Orridge, Kavus Torabi, Jennifer Herrema, Viv Albertine, Cosey Fanni Tutti, Hey Colossus, Graham Coxon, Pete Astor, King Buzzo, John Frusciante, Will Hodgkinson, John Maus, and many others.

Many of the songs from the album have been widely covered since its release.

== Reissues ==
As part of Harvest Records's "Harvest Heritage" series of reissues − and to capitalise on the breakthrough commercial success of Pink Floyd's The Dark Side of the Moon − The Madcap Laughs was re-released in September 1974 as record one of a double album, record two being Barrett's second and last solo album, Barrett. The cover of the double album was also designed by Storm Thorgerson.

On 26 April 1993, The Madcap Laughs, along with Barrett and Opel, were reissued both independently (Note: UK EMI Harvest 7243 8 28906 2 1 / CDGO 2053) and as part of the Crazy Diamond box set. (Note: UK EMI Harvest 0777 7 81412 2 8 / SYD BOX 1) A remastered version of The Madcap Laughs was released in 2010. (Note: UK EMI Harvest 5099991755827) That same year, 7 of the album's 13 tracks were included on the compilation album An Introduction to Syd Barrett. For its release, Gilmour laid down a new bass track to "Here I Go", and remixed "Octopus" and "She Took a Long Cold Look".

== Track listing ==
All songs written by Syd Barrett, except "Golden Hair" (music by Barrett, based on a poem by James Joyce). All track info taken from album booklet.

=== Original release ===
Side one
No.	Title	Notes	Length
1.	"Terrapin"	Take 1, recorded 11 April 1969, overdubs added 4 May; Produced by Malcolm Jones	5:04
2.	"No Good Trying"	Take 3, recorded 11 April 1969, overdubs added 3–4 May; Produced by Malcolm Jones	3:26
3.	"Love You"	Take 4, recorded 11 April 1969, overdubs added 3 May; Produced by Malcolm Jones	2:30
4.	"No Man's Land"	Take 5, recorded 17 April 1969, overdubs added 4 May; Produced by Malcolm Jones	3:03
5.	"Dark Globe"	Take 1, recorded 5 August 1969; Produced by David Gilmour and Roger Waters	2:02
6.	"Here I Go"	Take 5, recorded 17 April 1969; Produced by Malcolm Jones	3:11

Side two
No.	Title	Notes	Length
7.	"Octopus"	Take 11, recorded 12 June 1969, overdubs added 13 June; Produced by Syd Barrett and David Gilmour	3:47
8.	"Golden Hair"	Take 11 (Remake), recorded 12 June 1969; Produced by Syd Barrett and David Gilmour	1:59
9.	"Long Gone"	Take 1, recorded 26 July 1969; Produced by David Gilmour and Roger Waters	2:50
10.	"She Took a Long Cold Look"	Take 5, recorded 26 July 1969; Produced by David Gilmour and Roger Waters	1:55
11.	"Feel"	Take 1, recorded 26 July 1969; Produced by David Gilmour and Roger Waters	2:17
12.	"If It's in You"	Take 5, recorded 26 July 1969; Produced by David Gilmour and Roger Waters	2:26
13.	"Late Night"	Take 2, recorded 28 May 1968, overdubs added 11 April 1969; Produced by Pete Jenner, Malcolm Jones (overdubs)	3:10
Total length:			37:47

=== 1993 reissue ===
Bonus tracks
No.	Title	Notes	Length
14.	"Octopus"	Takes 1 and 2, recorded 12 June 1969; Produced by Syd Barrett and David Gilmour	3:09
15.	"It's No Good Trying"	Take 5, recorded 11 April 1969; Produced by Malcolm Jones	6:22
16.	"Love You"	Take 1, recorded 11 April 1969; Produced by Malcolm Jones	2:28
17.	"Love You"	Take 3, recorded 11 April 1969; Produced by Malcolm Jones	2:11
18.	"She Took a Long Cold Look at Me"	Take 4, recorded 26 July 1969; Produced by David Gilmour and Roger Waters	2:44
19.	"Golden Hair"	Take 5, recorded 8 June 1968; Produced by Pete Jenner	2:28
Total length:			57:13

=== 2015 Japanese reissue ===
No.	Title	Notes	Length
20.	"Rhamadan"	Take 1, instrumental	20:09

== Personnel ==
- Syd Barrett – acoustic and electric guitar, vocals, production
- David Gilmour – bass guitar, 12-string acoustic guitar, drums (on "Octopus"), production
- Jerry Shirley – drums (tracks 4, 6)
- Willie Wilson – bass (tracks 4, 6)
- Robert Wyatt – drums (tracks 2, 3)
- Hugh Hopper – bass guitar (tracks 2, 3)
- Mike Ratledge – keyboards (tracks 2, 3)

Production personnel

- Syd Barrett – producer (tracks 7, 8)
- David Gilmour – producer (tracks 5, 7–11)
- Peter Jenner – producer (track 13)
- Malcolm Jones – producer (tracks 1–4, 6, 12, 13)
- Roger Waters – producer (tracks 5, 9–11)
- Phil McDonald – engineer
- Peter Mew – engineer
- Mike Sheady – engineer
- Jeff Jarratt – engineer
- Tony Clark – engineer
- Mick Rock – photography
- Storm Thorgerson and Aubrey Powell of Hipgnosis – cover designs
