= Baby Lemonade =

Song by Syd Barrett

from the album Barrett
- Released: 14 November 1970
- Recorded: 26 February 1970
- Length: 4:10
- Label: Harvest/EMI; Capitol (US)
- Songwriter: Syd Barrett
- Producer: David Gilmour

Official audio
- "Baby Lemonade" (1994 remaster) on YouTube

"Baby Lemonade" is the opening track to Syd Barrett's second studio album, Barrett. "Baby Lemonade", and another song, "Gigolo Aunt", were recorded by Barrett playing and singing over a prerecorded backing track. The solo was performed by Barrett, not David Gilmour as is often noted. The intro was actually Barrett simply warming-up on guitar, that Gilmour had managed to record and placed it at the start of the album, making it seem like an intro to the song. It was included on the multi-artist Harvest compilation, A Breath of Fresh Air – A Harvest Records Anthology 1969–1974 in 2007.

== Lyrics ==
A "baby" is archaic public-house slang for a half-size bottle of mixer. "Baby lemonade" would be understood by Victorian barmaids to mean a small bottle of lemonade.

== Live ==
The song was performed along with four other songs (three songs that would later be recorded for Barrett, and one that was originally from The Madcap Laughs) and recorded for BBC Radio on 24 February 1970. These five tracks were later released on The Peel Session, and even later with three added songs (one being another version of "Baby Lemonade") from another BBC Radio show, as The Radio One Sessions.

== Personnel ==
- Syd Barrett – vocals, acoustic and electric guitars
- David Gilmour – 12-string guitar, bass guitar, producer
- Richard Wright – Hammond organ, piano, producer
- Jerry Shirley – drums
