= A Nice Pair =

Compilation album by Pink Floyd
- Released: 5 December 1973
- Recorded: 1967–1968
- Genres: Psychedelic rock, progressive rock
- Length: 79:19
- Language: English
- Label: Harvest/Capitol
- Producer: Norman Smith

Pink Floyd chronology
The Dark Side of the Moon (1973)	A Nice Pair (1973)	Wish You Were Here (1975)

Pink Floyd compilation albums chronology
Relics (1971)	A Nice Pair (1973)	A Collection of Great Dance Songs (1981)

Professional ratings
Review scores
Source	Rating
The Encyclopedia of Popular Music	4/5 stars

A Nice Pair is a compilation album by Pink Floyd, re-issuing their first two albums, The Piper at the Gates of Dawn and A Saucerful of Secrets in a new gatefold sleeve. The album was released in December 1973 by Harvest and Capitol in the United States and the following month in the United Kingdom by Harvest and EMI. It reached number 36 in the US Billboard album charts and was certified gold by the Recording Industry Association of America (RIAA) in March 1994.

== Release history and track variations ==
There are a few differences between the US and UK issues of the first LP of this compilation. In the US, Harvest Records and its distributor Capitol Records reconstructed their edition from tapes used for the US pressing of the band's 1967 debut album (Simply titled "Pink Floyd") mixed with other recordings from the UK version. As explained in a note on the back cover of the US edition, songs dropped from the original US LP, "Flaming", "Astronomy Domine" and "Bike" were restored for this re-issue. However, some of these restored songs are different from the UK version: The eight-minute live recording of "Astronomy Domine" from Ummagumma replaces the original four-minute studio recording. "Interstellar Overdrive" fades out slightly early (as it did on the original US LP) and adds a few seconds of silence before "The Gnome" rather than the immediate segue found on the UK version. "Flaming" is an alternate mix and edit which previously appeared as a US single, and the only track to appear on this album in mono. In later pressings, the correct stereo version of "Flaming" was restored. The US version of this album was also released in Canada.

== Cover art ==
The cover is by Hipgnosis, who designed many other Pink Floyd covers, and consists of four grids of nine small images, including some proposed but previously unused album cover designs. Several images depict a well-known phrase or saying in the form of a visual pun; for instance, the centre right-hand panel on the front depicts "a fork in the road", while the bottom right represents "a fine kettle of fish". Another picture presents two puns on the album title: a nice pear, and an image of a woman's pair of breasts; the latter is censored with a black bar on some copies, while other US copies opted to cover it with a purple and white sticker over the shrink wrap. Initial copies had a picture of a Mr. W.R. Phang's dental surgery on the cover (a genuine business photographed in Hammersmith, west London), but Dr. Phang objected because NHS dentists were not permitted to advertise, and the picture was replaced with one of a gargling monk. US editions from the 1980s restored both the nudity and the W.R. Phang photo. Other photos illustrate "laughing all the way to the bank", and "nip in the air", through the use of a levitating Japanese person. The selection of band photos on the inside cover also varies, with some copies including a photo of a shirtless, disturbed-looking Syd Barrett from The Madcap Laughs cover photo session, while others replace it with a photo of a smiling Barrett sitting by a car.

The album was the band's next US release after The Dark Side of the Moon, and introduced new fans to the earlier psychedelic sound of the Syd Barrett period of Pink Floyd, which contrasted greatly to the style of their more recent work. Following the worldwide re-issue of the original two albums on CD, including the original UK version of The Piper at the Gates of Dawn, A Nice Pair is now out of print.

== Track listing ==
All songs by Syd Barrett, except where noted.

=== The Piper at the Gates of Dawn ===
Side 1

1. "Astronomy Domine" – 4:14 (UK – 1967 studio version) / 8:25 (USA – 1969 live version)
2. "Lucifer Sam" – 3:07
3. "Matilda Mother" – 3:08
4. "Flaming" – 2:46
5. "Pow R. Toc H." (Barrett / Roger Waters / Richard Wright / Nick Mason) – 4:26
6. "Take Up Thy Stethoscope and Walk" (Waters) – 3:05

Side 2

7. "Interstellar Overdrive" (Barrett / Waters / Wright / Mason) – 9:41
8. "The Gnome" – 2:13
9. "Chapter 24" – 3:42
10. "The Scarecrow" – 2:11
11. "Bike" – 3:21

=== A Saucerful of Secrets ===
Side 1

1. "Let There Be More Light" (Waters) – 5:38
2. "Remember a Day" (Wright) – 4:33
3. "Set the Controls for the Heart of the Sun" (Waters) – 5:28
4. "Corporal Clegg" (Waters) – 4:13

Side 2

5. "A Saucerful of Secrets" (David Gilmour / Waters / Wright / Mason) – 11:57
6. "See-Saw" (Wright) – 4:36
7. "Jugband Blues" – 3:00

Cassette versions in the UK feature Piper on side one and Saucerful on side two. For the US versions, "Bike" was moved to the beginning of side two, due to the longer running length of "Astronomy Domine" on this version.

=== United States release ===
The US 8-track version alters the running order more radically.

Program 1

1. "Astronomy Domine"
2. "Lucifer Sam"
3. "Matilda Mother"
4. "Flaming"
5. "Pow R. Toc H."

Program 2

1. "Interstellar Overdrive"
2. "The Gnome"
3. "Chapter 24"
4. "The Scarecrow"
5. "Bike"

Program 3

1. "Take Up Thy Stethoscope and Walk"
2. "Let There Be More Light"
3. "Set the Controls for the Heart of the Sun"
4. "Corporal Clegg"
5. "Jugband Blues"

Program 4

1. "A Saucerful of Secrets"
2. "See Saw"
3. "Remember a Day"

== Personnel ==
Pink Floyd

- Syd Barrett – guitars, lead vocals on British version of "Astronomy Domine", "Lucifer Sam", "Matilda Mother", "Flaming", "Pow R. Toc H.", "The Gnome", "Chapter 24", "The Scarecrow", "Bike", and "Jugband Blues"
- David Gilmour – guitars, kazoo, vocals, lead vocals on American version of "Astronomy Domine", "Let There Be More Light", and "Corporal Clegg"
- Nick Mason – drums, percussion, kazoo, vocals, lead vocals on "Corporal Clegg"
- Roger Waters – bass guitar, percussion, vocals, lead vocals on "Pow R. Toc H.", "Take Up Thy Stethoscope and Walk", "Let There Be More Light", and "Set the Controls for the Heart of the Sun"
- Richard Wright – Farfisa and Hammond organs, piano, tack piano, electric piano, Mellotron, harmonium, cello, vibraphone, celesta, xylophone, violin, tin whistle, vocals, lead vocals on British and American versions of "Astronomy Domine", "Matilda Mother", "Remember a Day", "See-Saw", "Let There Be More Light", and "Corporal Clegg"

Additional personnel

- Peter Jenner – intro vocalisations on British and American version of "Astronomy Domine"
- Norman Smith – drums and backing vocals on "Remember a Day" and drum roll on "Interstellar Overdrive", producer
- The Salvation Army (The International Staff Band) on "Jugband Blues"

Cover design

- Sleeve design by Hipgnosis
- Graphics by Richard Evans
- Illustrations by Colin Elgie, Bob Lawrie

== Charts and certifications ==
=== Charts ===
Chart (1973–74)	Peak position
Canadian Albums (RPM)	33
French Albums (SNEP)	17
Italian Albums (Musica e Dischi)	10
Norwegian Albums (VG-lista)	8
UK Albums (Official Charts)	21
US Billboard 200	36

=== Certifications ===
Region	Certification	Certified units/sales
France (SNEP)	Gold	100,000^{*}
United Kingdom (BPI)	Gold	100,000^{^}
United States (RIAA)	Gold	500,000^{^}
^{*} Sales figures based on certification alone.^{^} Shipments figures based on certification alone.
