= Flaming (song) =

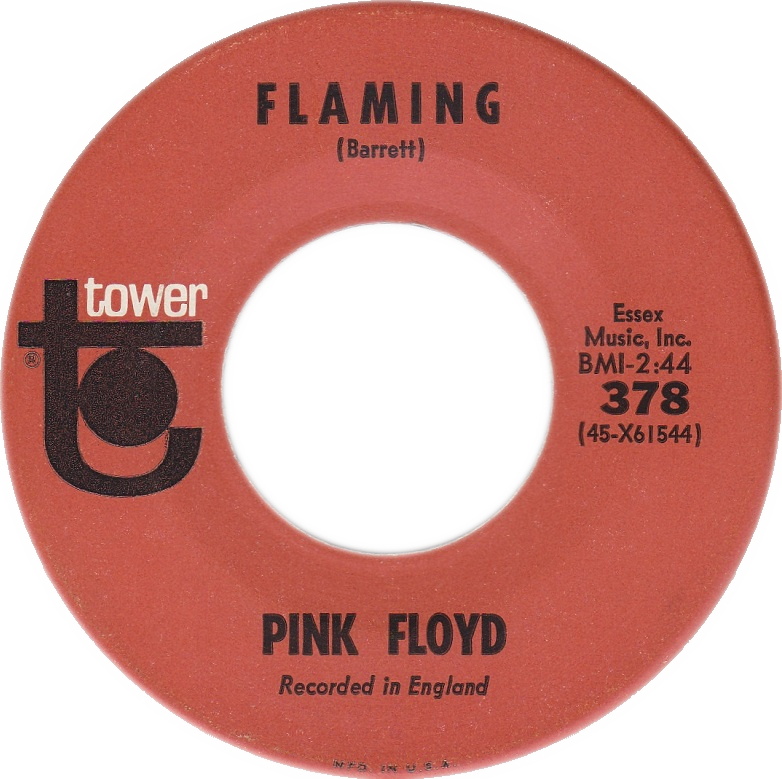
- A-side of US retail single

Single by Pink Floyd

from the album The Piper at the Gates of Dawn
- B-side: "The Gnome"
- Released: 6 November 1967
- Recorded: 16 March 1967
- Studio: Abbey Road, London, UK
- Genre: Psychedelic pop
- Length: 2:46
- Label: Tower (US)
- Songwriter: Syd Barrett
- Producer: Norman Smith

Pink Floyd singles chronology
"See Emily Play" (1967)	"Flaming" (1967)	"Apples and Oranges" (1967)

"Flaming" is a song by the English rock band Pink Floyd, featured on their 1967 debut album, The Piper at the Gates of Dawn. Written and sung by Syd Barrett, the song remained in their set until late 1968; David Gilmour sang the lead vocal after Barrett's departure.

== Writing ==
The song was originally titled "Snowing". Barrett's lyrics describe a childlike game with fantastical imagery, including a line "here we go, ever so high".

== Single ==
"Flaming" was also the third US Pink Floyd single (Tower 378) and was released by Tower Records, but it did not chart. The mono US single mix of "Flaming" is slightly edited from other stereo or mono versions of the recording. This US single was released in place of the UK single, "Apples and Oranges" (backed with "Paint Box"), which had then just failed to break into the UK charts.

It was released after the record label rejected the next big single after "See Emily Play" which was "Scream Thy Last Scream" / "Vegetable Man".

It was the first of two US Pink Floyd singles released on Tower that were not released on a single in the UK. The other US single that was not released in the UK was "Let There Be More Light" b/w "Remember a Day" (Tower 440).

== Live performances ==
A live version of "Flaming" (at that time known as "Snowing") was played in London's All Saints Hall in 1966. The song remained a live staple until the end of 1968, with David Gilmour singing the lead vocal after Barrett left the band early in the year. A version performed at the Paradiso, Amsterdam on 31 May was broadcast on NTS, while a performance in L'Antenne du Chapiteau du Kremlin-Bicêtre, Paris, on 31 October was broadcast on ORTF.

== Personnel ==
- Syd Barrett – lead vocals, electric guitar, 12-string acoustic guitar, vocal percussion, wind-up toys
- Rick Wright – Farfisa organ, tack piano, Hammond organ, Lowrey organ, backing vocals, vocal percussion, wind-up toys
- Roger Waters – bass guitar, slide whistle, backing vocals, vocal percussion, wind-up toys
- Nick Mason – drums, finger cymbals, wind-up toys

== Bibliography ==
- Mabbett, Andy (2010). Pink Floyd- The music and the mystery: The Music and the Mystery. Omnibus Press. ISBN 978-0-857-12418-0.
- Manning, Toby (2006). The Rough Guide to Pink Floyd (1st ed.). London: Rough Guides. ISBN 1-84353-575-0.
- Povey, Glenn (2007). Echoes : The Complete History of Pink Floyd (New ed.). Mind Head Publishing. ISBN 978-0-9554624-0-5.
