= Beyond the Wildwood =

Beyond the Wildwood – A Tribute to Syd Barrett

Compilation album by Various Artists
- Released: 1987
- Genre: Alternative rock
- Length: 60:15
- Label: Imaginary (UK)

Beyond the Wildwood – A Tribute to Syd Barrett is a tribute album consisting of music written by Pink Floyd's original guitarist, vocalist and primary songwriter Syd Barrett. The musicians performing on the album are British and American indie rock artists. The songs featured come from Pink Floyd's singles; the albums The Piper at the Gates of Dawn and A Saucerful of Secrets; and Barrett's two solo albums: The Madcap Laughs and Barrett. Although Barrett's productive recording career had only lasted from 1967 though 1970, his music had a great influence on the development of psychedelic rock, alternative rock and indie rock music.

== Track listing ==
All songs written by Syd Barrett, except where noted.

Side one
No.	Title	Artist	Length
1.	"No Good Trying"	The Mock Turtles	3:31
2.	"Octopus"	Plasticland	3:30
3.	"Arnold Layne"	SS-20	3:05
4.	"Matilda Mother"	Paul Roland	2:55
5.	"Long Cold Look"	Fit and Limo	2:18
6.	"Long Gone"	The Shamen	3:47
7.	"If the Sun Don't Shine (Adaptation of Jugband Blues)"	Opal	4:35

Side two
No.	Title	Artist	Length
8.	"Baby Lemonade"	The Ashes in the Morning	3:17
9.	"Wolfpack"	The Lobster Quadrille	3:04
10.	"Golden Hair" (Barrett/Joyce)	The Paint Set	1:58
11.	"No Man's Land"	Tropicana Fishtank	3:51
12.	"Apples and Oranges"	Television Personalities	3:14
13.	"Two of a Kind"	The Soup Dragons	2:51
14.	"Scream Thy Last Scream"	The Green Telescope	4:40

CD bonus tracks
No.	Title	Artist	Length
15.	"See Emily Play"	The Chemistry Set	3:12
16.	"Rats"	What Noise	4:50
17.	"Gigolo Aunt"	Death of Samantha	5:31
