= The Piper at the Gates of Dawn =

Studio album by Pink Floyd
- Released: 4 August 1967
- Recorded: 21 February – 21 May 1967
- Studios: EMI, London
- Genres: Psychedelic rock; acid pop; experimental rock; space rock; psychedelia
- Length: 41:54
- Label: EMI Columbia
- Producer: Norman Smith

Pink Floyd chronology
The Piper at the Gates of Dawn (1967)	A Saucerful of Secrets (1968)

Singles from The Piper at the Gates of Dawn
- 1. "Flaming" Released: November 1967 (US)

The Piper at the Gates of Dawn is the debut studio album by the English rock band Pink Floyd, released on 4 August 1967 by EMI Columbia. It is the only Pink Floyd album recorded under the leadership of founding member Syd Barrett (lead vocals, guitar); he was the sole writer of all but three tracks, with additional writing by members Roger Waters (bass, vocals), Nick Mason (drums), and Richard Wright (keyboards, vocals). The album followed the band's influential 1966–67 performances at London's UFO Club and their early chart success with the 1967 non-album singles "Arnold Layne" and "See Emily Play".

The recording sessions took place at EMI Studios in London's Abbey Road from February to May 1967 and were produced by Norman Smith. The results blended Pink Floyd's reputation for long-form improvisational pieces with Barrett's short pop songs and whimsical take on psychedelia. The album made prominent use of recording effects such as reverb and echo, employing tools such as EMT plate reverberation, automatic double tracking (ADT), and Abbey Road's echo chamber. Part-way through the recording sessions, Barrett's growing use of the psychedelic drug LSD accompanied his increasingly debilitated mental state, leading to his eventual departure from the group the following year. The album title was taken from chapter seven of Kenneth Grahame's 1908 children's novel The Wind in the Willows, a favourite of Barrett's.

The album was released to critical and commercial success, reaching number 6 on the UK Albums Chart. In the United States, it was released as Pink Floyd in October on Tower Records with an altered track listing that omitted three songs and included "See Emily Play". In the UK, no singles were released from the album, but in the US, "Flaming" was offered as a single. Two of its songs, "Astronomy Dominé" and "Interstellar Overdrive", became long-term mainstays of the band's live setlist, while other songs were performed live only a handful of times. In 1973, The Piper at the Gates of Dawn was packaged with the band's second album A Saucerful of Secrets (1968) and released as A Nice Pair, to introduce the band's early work to new fans gained with the success of The Dark Side of the Moon (1973).

The album has since been hailed as a pivotal psychedelic music recording. Special limited editions of The Piper at the Gates of Dawn were issued to mark its 30th, 40th, and 50th anniversaries, with the former two releases containing bonus tracks. In 2012, The Piper at the Gates of Dawn was placed at number 347 on Rolling Stone magazine's list of the "500 Greatest Albums of All Time", moving up to number 253 in the 2020 edition.

== Background ==
Architecture students Roger Waters, Nick Mason and Richard Wright and art student Syd Barrett had performed under various group names since 1962, and began touring as "The Pink Floyd Sound" in 1965. Around 1966, the group began to achieve underground success for their influential performances at London's UFO Club. They turned professional on 1 February 1967 when they signed with EMI, with an advance fee of £5,000 (equivalent to £80,000 in 2025). Their first single, a song about a kleptomaniac transvestite titled "Arnold Layne", was released on 11 March to mild controversy, as Radio London refused to air it.

About three weeks later, the band were introduced to the mainstream media. (Note: They were already well known in the underground scene.) EMI's press release claimed that the band were "musical spokesmen for a new movement which involves experimentation in all the arts", but EMI attempted to put some distance between them and the underground scene from which the band originated by stating that "the Pink Floyd does not know what people mean by psychedelic pop and are not trying to create hallucinatory effects on their audiences." The band returned to Sound Techniques studio to record their next single, "See Emily Play", on 18 May. The single was released almost a month later, on 16 June, and reached number six in the charts.

Pink Floyd picked up a tabloid reputation for making music for LSD users. The popular broadsheet News of the World printed a story nine days before the album's recording sessions began, saying that "The Pink Floyd group specialise in 'psychedelic music', which is designed to illustrate LSD experiences." Contrary to this image, only Barrett was known to be taking LSD; authors Ray B. Browne and Pat Browne contend that he was the "only real drug user in the band".

== Recording ==
Pink Floyd's record deal was a £5,000 advance over five years, low royalties and no free studio time, which was poor by today's standards, but typical for the time. It included album development, which was very unusual; EMI, unsure of exactly what kind of band they had signed, gave them free rein to record whatever they wanted.

They recorded the album at EMI's Abbey Road Studios in London and their recording room was next to the Beatles' recording room where the Beatles were recording the album Sgt. Pepper's Lonely Hearts Club Band. Pink Floyd sat in on one Beatles session for the song "Lovely Rita". The Piper at the Gates of Dawn was overseen by producer Norman Smith, a central figure in Pink Floyd's negotiations with EMI. Balance engineer Pete Bown, who had mentored Smith, helped ensure that the album had a unique sound, through his experimentation with equipment and recording techniques. Bown, assisted by studio manager David Harris, set up microphones an hour before the sessions began. Bown's microphone choices were mostly different from those used by Smith to record the Beatles' EMI sessions. Because of the quietness of Barrett's singing, he was placed in a vocal isolation booth to sing his parts. Automatic double tracking (ADT) was used to add layers of echo to the vocals and to some instruments. The album features an unusually heavy use of echo and reverb to create a unique sound. Much of the reverb came from a set of Elektro-Mess-Technik plate reverberators – customised EMT 140s containing thin metal plates under tension – and the studio's tiled echo chamber built in 1931.

The album is made up of two different classes of songs: lengthy improvisations from the band's live performances and shorter songs that Barrett had written. Barrett's LSD intake escalated part-way through the album's recording sessions. Although in his 2005 autobiography Mason recalled the sessions as relatively trouble-free, Smith disagreed and claimed that Barrett was unresponsive to his suggestions and constructive criticism. In an attempt to build a relationship with the band, Smith played jazz on the piano while the band joined in. These jam sessions worked well with Waters, who was apparently helpful, and Wright, who was "laid-back". Smith's attempts to connect with Barrett were less productive: "With Syd, I eventually realised I was wasting my time." Smith later admitted that his traditional ideas of music were somewhat at odds with the psychedelic background from which Pink Floyd had come. Nevertheless, he managed to "discourage the live ramble", as band manager Peter Jenner called it, guiding the band toward producing songs with a more manageable length.

Barrett would end up writing eight of the album's songs and contributing to two instrumentals credited to the whole band, with Waters creating the sole remaining composition "Take Up Thy Stethoscope and Walk". Mason recalled how the album "was recorded in what one might call the old-fashioned way: rather quickly. As time went by we started spending longer and longer."

I opened the door and nearly shit myself ... by Christ it was loud. I had certainly never heard anything quite like it before.

— Abbey Road engineer Pete Bown describing his introduction to "Interstellar Overdrive"

Recording started on 21 February with six takes of "Matilda Mother", then called "Matilda's Mother". The following week, on the 27th, the band recorded five takes of "Interstellar Overdrive", (Note: This was not the first time the band had recorded the song as it had been recorded earlier in the year at Sound Techniques Studios in London, between 11 and 12 January, for producer Peter Whitehead's documentary Tonite Let's All Make Love in London.) (Note: An early, unoverdubbed, shortened mix of the album's "Interstellar Overdrive" was used for a French EP release that July.) and "Chapter 24". On 16 March, the band had another go at recording "Interstellar Overdrive", in an attempt to create a shorter version, and "Flaming" (originally titled "Snowing"), which was recorded in a single take with one vocal overdub. On 19 March, six takes of "The Gnome" were recorded. The following day, the band recorded Waters' "Take Up Thy Stethoscope and Walk". On 21 March, the band were invited to watch the Beatles record "Lovely Rita". The following day, they recorded "The Scarecrow" in one take. The next three tracks – "Astronomy Dominé", (Note: 14 takes of "Astronomy Dominé" were recorded, over a seven-hour session.) "Interstellar Overdrive" and "Pow R. Toc H." – were worked on extensively between 21 March and 12 April, having originally been lengthy instrumentals. Between 12 and 18 April, the band recorded "Percy the Rat Catcher" (Note: "Percy the Rat Catcher".") and a currently unreleased track called "She Was a Millionaire".

"Percy the Rat Catcher" received overdubs across five studio sessions and then was mixed in late June, eventually being given the name "Lucifer Sam". Songwriting for the majority of the album is credited solely to Barrett, with tracks such as "Bike" having been written in late 1966 before the album was started. "Bike" was recorded on 21 May 1967 and originally entitled "The Bike Song". By June, Barrett's increasing LSD use during the recording project left him looking visibly debilitated.

== Writing and music ==
The Piper at the Gates of Dawn successfully captures both sides of psychedelic experimentation – the pleasures of expanding one's mind and perception, and an underlying threat of mental disorder and even lunacy.

— Steve Huey of AllMusic

According to the staff of BrooklynVegan, the album "is as classic as psychedelic pop gets." The album has drawn comparisons to British Invasion bands, albeit "weirder and darker." The album's harmonies have been described as "dreamy." The track "Matilda Mother" contains Eastern-style melodies. "Interstellar Overdrive" contains elements of space rock. Steve Huey of AllMusic assessed that the album's tracks alternate between "catchy, melodic acid pop songs" and "longer, more experimental pieces showcasing the group's instrumental freak-outs." He described the album's lyrical content as "full of colorful, childlike, distinctly British whimsy, albeit filtered through the perceptive lens of LSD." Additionally, the album contains themes pertaining to space travel. Rick Wright's keyboard work has been described as sounding "eerie," and makes use of dissonance and chromaticism. Music historian Jeff Gold suggested that the album's "more spacey excursions like "Astronomy Domine," "Interstellar Overdrive" and "Lucifer Sam" firmly captured the freak-flag of British psychedelia."

== Release ==
In June 1967, before the album was released, the single "See Emily Play" was sold as a 7-inch 45 rpm record, with "The Scarecrow" on the B-side, listed as "Scarecrow". The full album was released on 4 August 1967, including "The Scarecrow".

Pink Floyd continued to perform at the UFO Club, drawing huge crowds, but Barrett's deterioration caused them serious concern. The band initially hoped that his erratic behaviour was a phase that would pass, but others, including manager Peter Jenner and his secretary June Child, (Note: Child was employed by Peter Jenner as a secretary and general production assistant.) were more realistic:

... I found him in the dressing room and he was so ... gone. Roger Waters and I got him on his feet, we got him out to the stage ... and of course the audience went spare because they loved him. The band started to play and Syd just stood there. He had his guitar around his neck and his arms just hanging down.

To the band's consternation, they were forced to cancel their appearance at the prestigious National Jazz and Blues Festival, informing the music press that Barrett was suffering from nervous exhaustion. Jenner and Waters arranged for Barrett to see a psychiatrist – a meeting he did not attend. He was sent to relax in the sun on the Spanish island of Formentera with Waters and Sam Hutt (a doctor well-established in the underground music scene), but this led to no visible improvement.

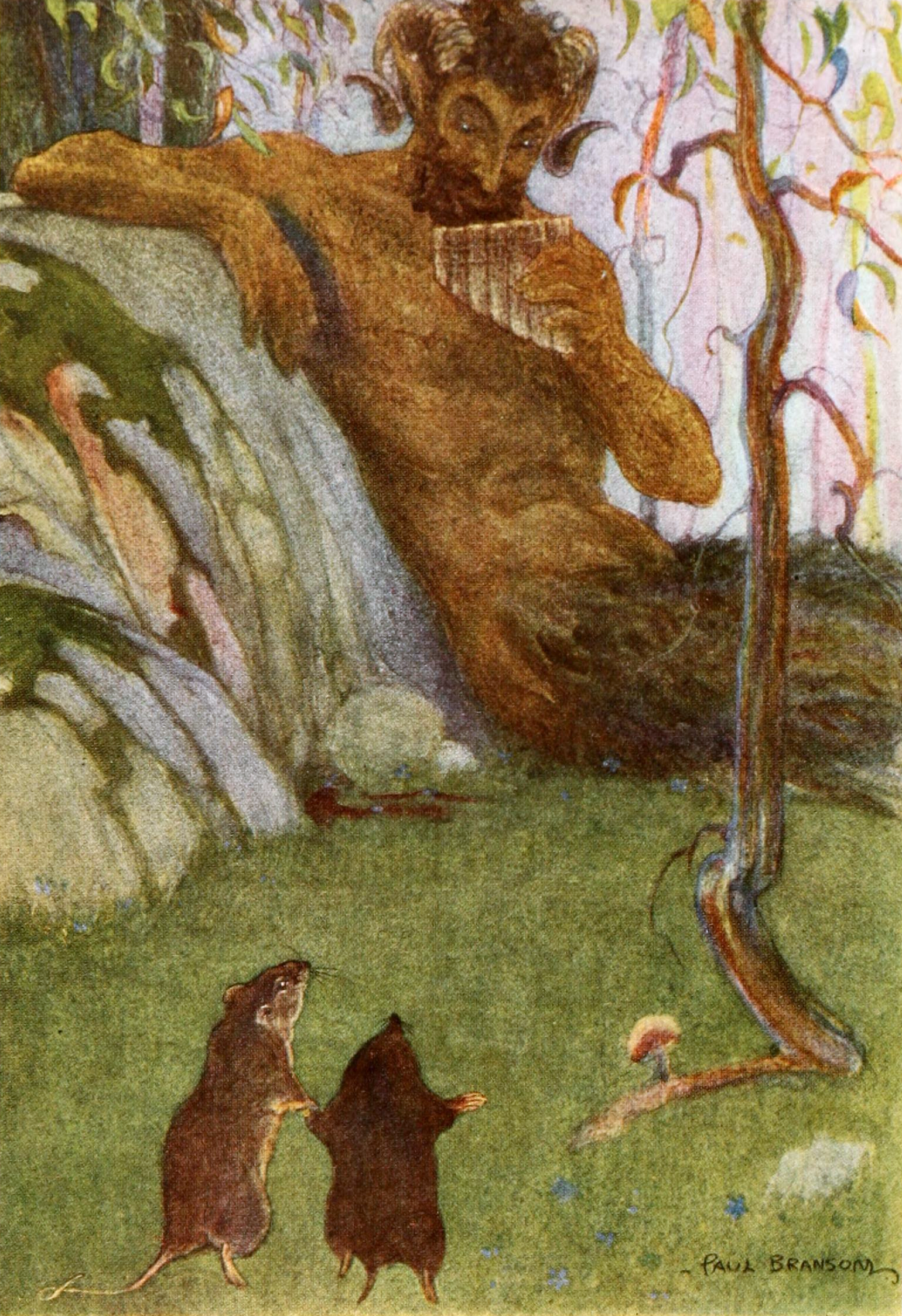
The album's title, The Piper at the Gates of Dawn, refers to the god Pan, as depicted in the 1908 book The Wind in the Willows.

The original UK LP was released on 4 August 1967 in both monaural and stereophonic mixes. It reached number six on the UK charts. The original US album appeared on the Tower division of Capitol on 21 October 1967. This version was officially titled simply Pink Floyd, though the original album title did appear on the back cover as on the UK issue, and Dick Clark referred to the record by its original title when the group appeared on his American Bandstand television program on 18 November. The US album featured an abbreviated track listing, and reached number 131 on the Billboard charts. The UK single, "See Emily Play", was substituted for "Astronomy Dominé", "Flaming" and "Bike". Released in time for the band's US tour, "Flaming" was released as a single, backed with "The Gnome". The Tower issue of the album also faded out "Interstellar Overdrive" and broke up the segue into "The Gnome" to fit the re-sequencing of the songs. Later US issues on compact disc had the same title and track list as the UK version. The album was certified Gold in the US as a part of A Nice Pair with A Saucerful of Secrets on 11 March 1994.

About being handled on Tower Records, Jenner commented that: "In terms of the U.K. and Europe it was always fine. America was always difficult. Capitol couldn't see it. You know, 'What is this latest bit of rubbish from England? Oh Christ, it'll give us more grief, so we'll put it out on Tower Records', which was a subsidiary of Capitol Records [...] It was a very cheapskate operation and it was the beginning of endless problems The Floyd had with Capitol. It started off bad and went on being bad."

=== Packaging ===
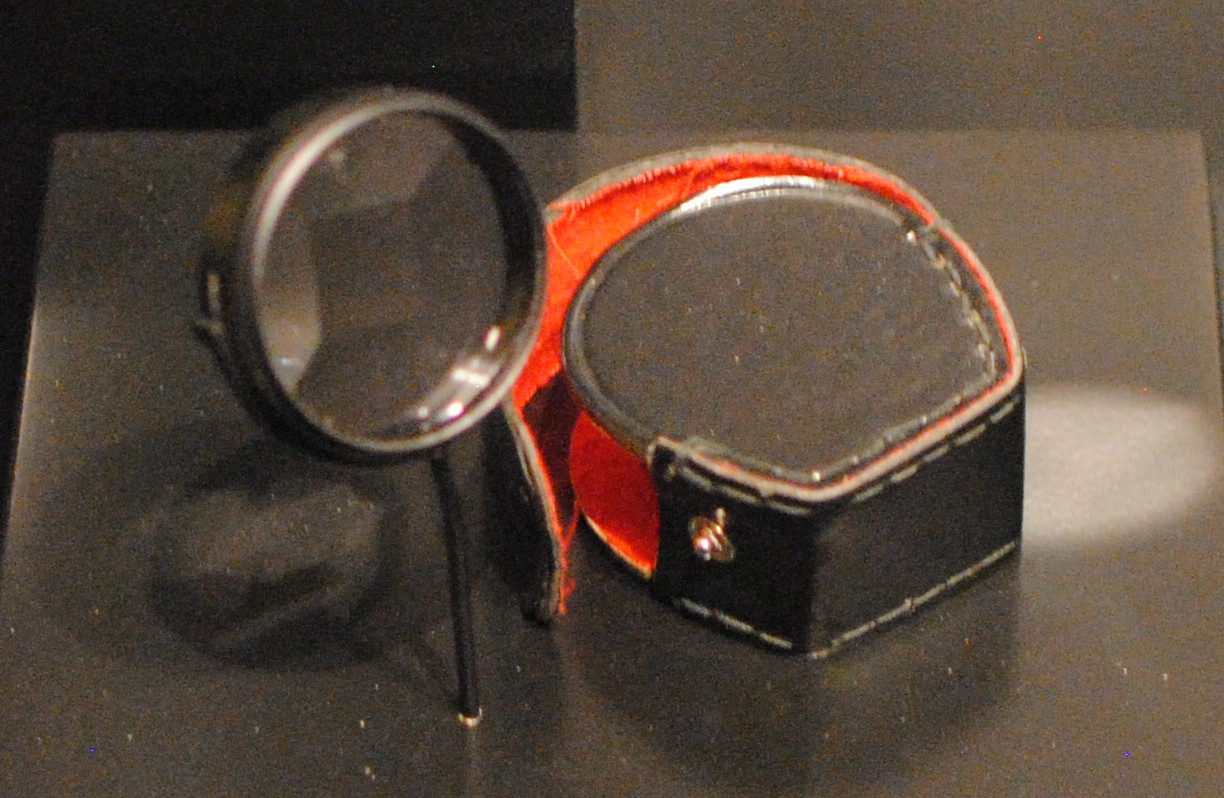
Vic Singh's lens, used to take the cover picture for The Piper at the Gates of Dawn (displayed at the Pink Floyd: Their Mortal Remains exhibition)

It was unusual and different, and they were delighted with it, and Syd did his own little drawing on the back cover.

— Vic Singh

Up-and-coming society photographer Vic Singh was hired to photograph the band for the album cover. Singh shared a studio with photographer David Bailey, and he was friends with Beatles guitarist George Harrison. Singh asked Jenner and King to dress the band in the brightest clothes they could find. Singh then shot them with a prism lens that Harrison had given him. The cover was meant to resemble an LSD trip, a style that was favoured at the time. In 2017, the lens was displayed at the Victoria and Albert Museum, as part of the Pink Floyd: Their Mortal Remains exhibition.

Barrett came up with the album title The Piper at the Gates of Dawn; the album was originally titled Projection up to as late as July 1967. The title was taken from that of chapter seven of Kenneth Grahame's The Wind in the Willows which contains a visionary encounter with the god Pan, who plays his pan pipe at dawn. It was one of Barrett's favourite books, and he often gave friends the impression that he was the embodiment of Pan. (Note: Barrett believed he had a dream-like experience meeting Pan, with characters from the book. Andrew King said Barrett thought Pan had given him understanding of how nature works.) The moniker was later used in the song "Shine On You Crazy Diamond", in which Barrett is called "you Piper". The cover was one of several Pink Floyd album covers used on a series of Royal Mail stamps issued in May 2016 to commemorate 50 years of Pink Floyd.

In 2018, the album was reissued in its mono mix. With this version came a new packaging box with the original record cover inside. This new design was done by Hipgnosis' Aubrey Powell and Peter Curzon and includes a gold-embossed version of the graphic by Syd Barrett which features on the back cover of the original LP.

=== Critical reception ===
At the time of release, both Record Mirror and NME gave the album four stars out of five. Record Mirror commented that "[t]he psychedelic image of the group really comes to life, record wise, on this LP which is a fine showcase for both their talent and the recording technique. Plenty of mind blowing sound, both blatant and subtle here, and the whole thing is extremely well performed." Cash Box called it "a particularly striking collection of driving, up-to-date rock ventures". Paul McCartney and Pink Floyd's previous producer Joe Boyd both rated the album highly. Some voiced the opinion of the underground fans, by suggesting that the album did not reflect the band's live performances.

== Legacy ==
Professional ratings
Review scores
Source	Rating
About.com	4.5/5 stars
AllMusic	5/5 stars
The Daily Telegraph	4/5 stars
Encyclopedia of Popular Music	4/5 stars
MusicHound	3.5/5
NME	9/10
Paste	9.5/10
Pitchfork	9.4/10
Q	5/5 stars
The Rolling Stone Album Guide	5/5 stars

"When I first heard their music, I wasn't terribly impressed," recalled then-EMI employee Alan Parsons. "I was working at [EMI's headquarters] Hayes and the Piper at the Gates of Dawn album came to me for duplication. And I was thinking if this was to be the music of the future, I wasn't looking forward to it. But, like a lot of stuff, you get to like bits of it over a long period."

In 1999, Rolling Stone gave the album 4.5 stars out of 5, calling it "the golden achievement of Syd Barrett". In 2003, it was ranked number 347 on the magazine's "The 500 Greatest Albums of All Time", maintaining that rank in the 2012 update and climbing to number 253 in the 2020 reboot of the list.

The Piper at the Gates of Dawn is hailed as a psychedelic masterpiece and LSD is named as a direct influence. AllMusic called it one of the greatest psychedelic albums of all time, and described it as "full of colorful, childlike, distinctly British whimsy, albeit filtered through the perceptive lens of LSD," adding that "Barrett's catchy, melodic acid pop songs are balanced with longer, more experimental pieces showcasing the group's instrumental freak-outs."

James E. Perone says that The Piper at the Gates of Dawn became known as a concept album in later years, because listeners wanted to play it all the way through rather than pick out a favourite song. While Beatles biographer Philip Norman agrees that The Piper at the Gates of Dawn is a concept album, other authors contend that Pink Floyd did not start making concept albums until 1973's The Dark Side of the Moon. Author George Reisch called Pink Floyd the "undisputed" kings of the concept album, but only starting from Dark Side. In July 2006, Billboard described The Piper at the Gates of Dawn as "one of the best psychedelic rock albums ever, driven by Barrett's oddball narratives and the band's skill with both long jams and perfect pop nuggets".

In the book 101 Essential Rock Records, music historian Jeff Gold suggested that Pink Floyd "ultimately invented progressive rock in one fell swoop" with the album.

In 2026, Em Casalena of American Songwriter named the album one of "3 Psychedelic Rock Albums ... Undeniably Perfect From Start To Finish."

=== Reissues ===
The Piper at the Gates of Dawn was reissued in the UK in 1979 as a stereo vinyl album, (Note: UK EMI Fame FA 3065) and on CD in the UK and US in 1985. (Note: UK EMI CDP 7463842, US Capitol CDP 7463842>) A digitally remastered stereo CD, with new artwork, was released in the US in 1994, (Note: US Capitol CDP 7463844) and in 1997 limited edition 30th anniversary mono editions were released in the UK, on CD and vinyl. (Note: UK EMI LP EMP 1110, EMI CD EMP 1110) The latter included a selection of art prints, and a six-track bonus CD, 1967: The First Three Singles.

In 1973, the album, along with A Saucerful of Secrets, was released as a two-disc set on Capitol/EMI's Harvest Records label, titled A Nice Pair to introduce fans to the band's early work after the success of The Dark Side of the Moon. On the US release, the original four-minute studio version of "Astronomy Dominé" was replaced with the eight-minute live version found on Ummagumma.

For the 40th anniversary, a two-disc edition was released on 28 August 2007, and a three-disc set was released on 11 September. The Piper at the Gates of Dawn was remastered and re-released on 26 September 2011. For Record Store Day 2018, The Piper at the Gates of Dawn was reissued in its mono mix with a bespoke envelope package containing the original cover art.

== Live performances ==
The band promoted the album with a series of concerts. They played dates in Ireland and Scandinavia, and in late October the band was to embark on their first tour of the United States. It was unsuccessful, mainly because of the mental breakdown of Barrett. In his capacity as tour manager, Andrew King travelled to New York to begin preparations, but he ran into serious problems. Visas had not arrived, prompting the cancellation of the first six dates. The band finally flew across the Atlantic on 1 November, but work permits were not yet obtained, so they settled into a hotel in Sausalito, California, just north of San Francisco. After a number of cancellations, the first US performance was given 4 November at Winterland Ballroom, following Janis Joplin fronting Big Brother and the Holding Company.

Communication between record company and band was almost non-existent, and Pink Floyd's relationship with Tower and Capitol was therefore poor. Barrett's mental condition mirrored the problems that King encountered; when the band performed at Winterland, he detuned his guitar during "Interstellar Overdrive" until the strings fell off. His odd behaviour grew worse in subsequent performances, and during a television recording for The Pat Boone Show he confounded the director by lip-syncing "Apples and Oranges" perfectly during the rehearsal, and then standing motionless during the take. King quickly curtailed the band's US visit, sending them home on the next flight.

Shortly after their return from the US, beginning 14 November, the band supported Jimi Hendrix on a tour of England, but on one occasion Barrett failed to turn up and they were forced to replace him with singer/guitarist David O'List borrowed from the opening band the Nice. Barrett's depression worsened the longer the tour continued. Longtime Pink Floyd psychedelic lighting designer Peter Wynne-Willson left at the end of the Hendrix tour, though he sympathised with Barrett, whose position as frontman was increasingly insecure. Wynne-Willson, who had worked for a percentage, was replaced by his assistant John Marsh, who collected a lesser wage. Pink Floyd released "Apples and Oranges" (recorded prior to the US tour on 26 and 27 October) but, for the rest of the band, Barrett's condition had reached a crisis point, and they responded by adding David Gilmour to their line-up, initially to cover for Syd's lapses during live performances.

Some songs on the album were rarely played live. "Flaming" and "Pow R. Toc H." were performed by Pink Floyd after Barrett's departure in 1968. After September 1967, the band played several new songs in concert. These included "One in a Million", "Scream Thy Last Scream", "Set the Controls for the Heart of the Sun" and "Reaction in G", the last of which was a song created by the band in response to crowds asking for their hit singles "See Emily Play" and "Arnold Layne". Barrett resurrected the track "Lucifer Sam" with his short-lived 1972 band Stars. "Astronomy Dominé" was later on the live disc of Ummagumma (1969), and adopted by the post-Waters Pink Floyd during the 1994 Division Bell Tour, with a version included on the 1995 live album Pulse. David Gilmour, though not a member of Pink Floyd at the time the song was originally recorded, resurrected "Astronomy Dominé" for his On an Island and Rattle That Lock tours.

== Track listing ==
=== UK release ===
All tracks are written and sung by Syd Barrett, unless otherwise noted.

Side one
No.	Title	Writer(s)	Lead vocals	Length
1.	"Astronomy Dominé"		Barrett and Richard Wright	4:12
2.	"Lucifer Sam"			3:07
3.	"Matilda Mother"		Barrett and Wright	3:08
4.	"Flaming"			2:46
5.	"Pow R. Toc H."	Barrett; Roger Waters; Wright; Nick Mason	Instrumental; wordless vocals by Barrett, Waters and Wright	4:26
6.	"Take Up Thy Stethoscope and Walk"	Waters	Waters	3:05
Total length:				20:44

Side two
No.	Title	Writer(s)	Lead vocals	Length
1.	"Interstellar Overdrive"	Barrett; Waters; Wright; Mason	Instrumental	9:41
2.	"The Gnome"			2:13
3.	"Chapter 24"			3:42
4.	"The Scarecrow"			2:11
5.	"Bike"			3:21
Total length:				21:08 41:54

=== US release ===
Side one
No.	Title	Writer(s)	Lead vocals	Length
1.	"See Emily Play"			2:53
2.	"Pow R. Toc H."	Barrett; Waters; Wright; Mason	Instrumental	4:26
3.	"Take Up Thy Stethoscope and Walk"	Waters	Waters	3:05
4.	"Lucifer Sam"			3:07
5.	"Matilda Mother"		Barrett and Wright	3:08
Total length:				16:39

Side two
No.	Title	Writer(s)	Lead vocals	Length
1.	"The Scarecrow"			2:11
2.	"The Gnome"			2:13
3.	"Chapter 24"			3:42
4.	"Interstellar Overdrive"	Barrett; Waters; Wright; Mason	Instrumental	9:41
Total length:				17:47

=== 40th anniversary edition bonus disc ===
Released in 2007, this edition contains the original mono and stereo mixes of the album, each on its own CD. Some editions also include a third CD consisting of the following bonus tracks.

Disc three
No.	Title	Lead vocals	Length
1.	"Arnold Layne"		2:57
2.	"Candy and a Currant Bun"		2:45
3.	"See Emily Play"		2:54
4.	"Apples and Oranges"		3:05
5.	"Paintbox" (Wright)	Wright	3:45
6.	"Interstellar Overdrive (Take 2) (French Edit)"	Instrumental	5:15
7.	"Apples and Oranges (Stereo Version)"		3:11
8.	"Matilda Mother (Alternative Version)"		3:09
9.	"Interstellar Overdrive (Take 6)"	Instrumental	5:03
Total length:			32:04

== Outtakes ==
Title	Length	Recorded	Notes
"Remember a Day"	4:33	9 May 1967, Sound Techniques, London	Written by Richard Wright. Recorded during the Piper sessions, but its release was postponed until A Saucerful of Secrets (1968).

== Personnel ==
Credits adapted from CD liner notes, except where noted.

Pink Floyd

- Syd Barrett – vocals, guitars
- Roger Waters – bass guitar, vocals
- Rick Wright – organ, piano, vocals
- Nick Mason – drums

Additional musicians

- Peter Jenner – intro vocalisations ("Astronomy Dominé")
- Norman Smith – drum roll ("Interstellar Overdrive")

Technical

- Norman Smith – producer; vocal and instrumental arrangements
- Peter Bown – engineer
- Vic Singh – front cover photo
- Syd Barrett – rear cover design

== Charts ==
1967–68 weekly chart performance for The Piper at the Gates of Dawn
Chart (1967–68)	Peak position
UK Albums (Official Charts)	6
US Billboard 200	131

1997 weekly chart performance for The Piper at the Gates of Dawn
Chart (1997)	Peak position
Dutch Albums (Album Top 100)	60
UK Albums (Official Charts)	44

2007 weekly chart performance for The Piper at the Gates of Dawn
Chart (2007)	Peak position
Belgian Albums (Ultratop Flanders)	28
Belgian Albums (Ultratop Wallonia)	39
Czech Albums (ČNS IFPI)	34
Dutch Albums (Album Top 100)	46
German Albums (Offizielle Top 100)	48
Italian Albums (FIMI)	16
Norwegian Albums (VG-lista)	10
Polish Albums (ZPAV)	38
Spanish Albums (Promusicae)	70
Swedish Albums (Sverigetopplistan)	43
Swiss Albums (Schweizer Hitparade)	87
UK Albums (Official Charts)	22

2011 weekly chart performance for The Piper at the Gates of Dawn
Chart (2011)	Peak position
French Albums (SNEP)	150

2022 weekly chart performance for The Piper at the Gates of Dawn
Chart (2022)	Peak position
German Albums (Offizielle Top 100)	48
Hungarian Albums (MAHASZ)	15

== Certifications ==
Certifications for The Piper at the Gates of Dawn
Region	Certification	Certified units/sales
Italy (FIMI)	Gold	25,000^{*}
United Kingdom (BPI) 1994 release	Gold	100,000^{‡}
^{*} Sales figures based on certification alone.^{‡} Sales+streaming figures based on certification alone.

== Cultural references ==
- The album The Dark Side of the Moog IV (1996) by Klaus Schulze and Pete Namlook is subtitled "Three Pipers at the Gates of Dawn".
