= A Saucerful of Secrets =

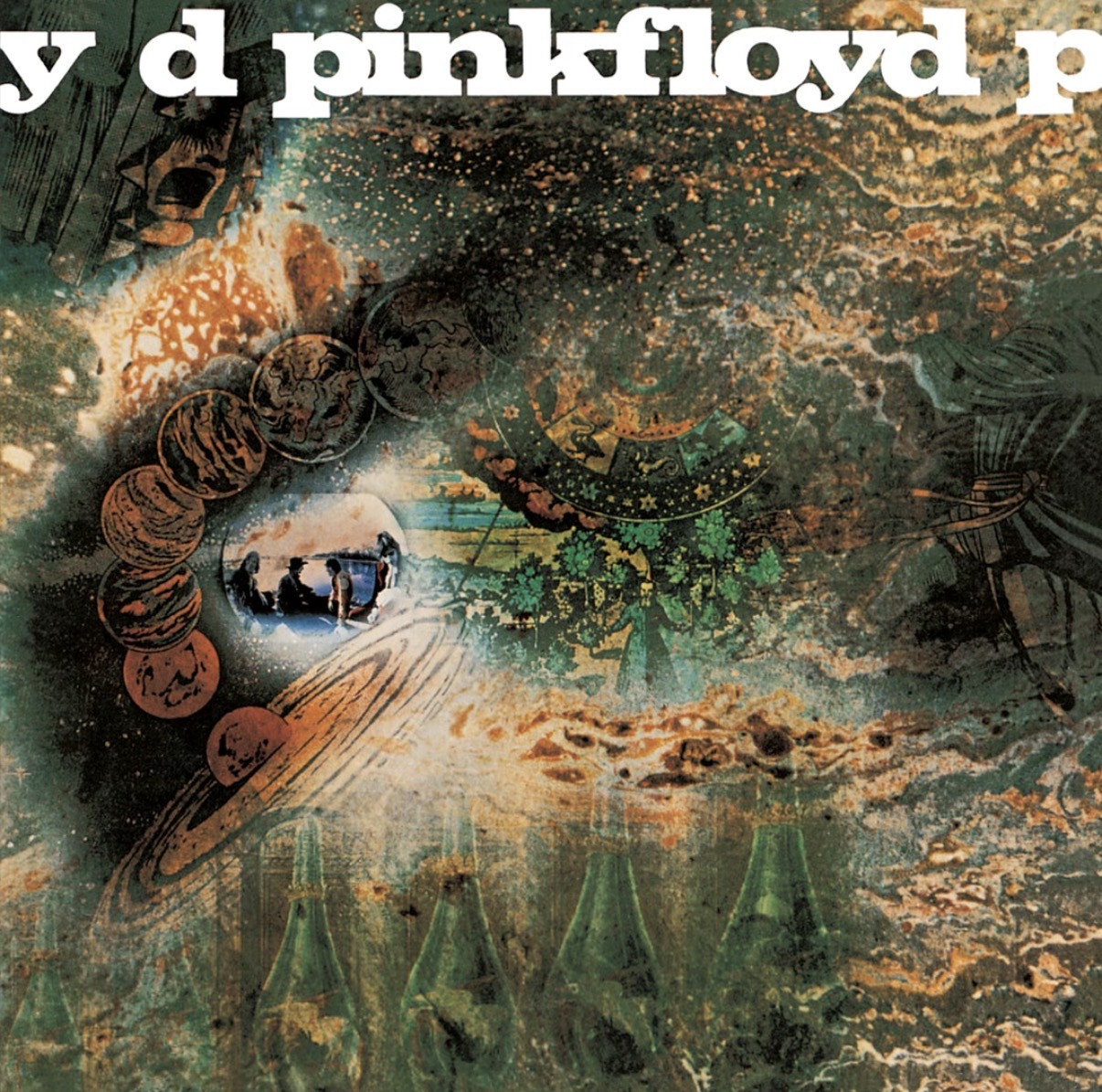

Studio album by Pink Floyd
- Released: 28 June 1968
- Recorded: 9 May 1967 – 3 May 1968
- Studios: EMI and De Lane Lea, London
- Genres: Psychedelic rock; experimental rock; space rock
- Length: 39:25
- Label: EMI Columbia
- Producer: Norman Smith

Pink Floyd chronology
The Piper at the Gates of Dawn (1967)	A Saucerful of Secrets (1968)	More (1969)

Singles from A Saucerful of Secrets
- 1. "Let There Be More Light" Released: 19 August 1968 (US)

A Saucerful of Secrets is the second studio album by the English rock band Pink Floyd, released on 28 June 1968 by EMI Columbia in the UK and in the US by Tower Records. The mental health of the singer and guitarist Syd Barrett deteriorated during recording, so David Gilmour was recruited; Barrett left the band before the album's completion.

Whereas Barrett had been the primary songwriter on Pink Floyd's debut album, The Piper at the Gates of Dawn (1967), on A Saucerful of Secrets each member contributed songwriting and lead vocals. Gilmour appears on all but two songs, while Barrett contributed to three. "Set the Controls for the Heart of the Sun" is the only song on which all five members appear.

Following "Remember a Day", the sessions for A Saucerful of Secrets included two unreleased tracks by Syd Barrett: "Vegetable Man" and "Scream Thy Last Scream", both of which featured disjointed song structures, and were of an experimental nature. These recordings highlight the challenges Pink Floyd faced during this transitional period while dealing with Barrett's erratic stage presence and unpredictability.

A Saucerful of Secrets reached number nine in the UK charts, but did not chart in the US until April 2019, peaking at number 158. It received mostly positive reviews, though many critics have deemed it inferior to The Piper at the Gates of Dawn.

== Recording ==
Pink Floyd released their debut album, The Piper at the Gates of Dawn, in August 1967. Work began on A Saucerful of Secrets in the same month at EMI Studios (now Abbey Road Studios) in London with the producer Norman Smith. The first songs recorded were "Scream Thy Last Scream", written by the singer and guitarist, Syd Barrett, and "Set the Controls for the Heart of the Sun", written by the bassist, Roger Waters. Despite having only two complete takes of the former, "Scream Thy Last Scream" was viewed as a potential single. Both songs were recorded on 7 and 8 August 1967. They were planned for release as a single on 8 September, but this was vetoed by Pink Floyd's record company, EMI.

Following a brief European tour, in early October of '67, the band returned to the studio and recorded "Vegetable Man", another Syd Barrett song (who also performed lead vocals), and "Scream Thy Last Scream" which was again rescheduled for release, only this time with "Vegetable Man" as the B-side, but it was once again vetoed by their label EMI. The band returned on 19 October to record "Jugband Blues", another Barrett song, with Smith booking a Salvation Army brass band on Barrett's recommendation. (Note: When the Salvation Army were brought in to play on the track, Barrett's instructions to Smith were "let them play whatever they want", while Smith had insisted on composed parts versus improvisation.) During these sessions, Barrett overdubbed slide guitar onto "Remember a Day", an outtake from The Piper at the Gates of Dawn. In late October, the band took a break from the album sessions to record what was to be the third and final Pink Floyd single by Barrett, "Apples and Oranges", on 26 and 27 October. A few days later, they recorded what would become the B-side, "Paint Box", before leaving for their first US tour. On 17 November 1967, "Apples and Oranges" was released as a single following Pink Floyd's US tour. Despite the band performing it on American Bandstand on 7 November which was their US television debut, it only reached number 55 in the UK charts, thus failing to match the chart success of their earlier singles "See Emily Play" and "Arnold Layne". Roger Waters later blamed Norman Smith's production for the single's failure to top the charts, stating "'Apples and Oranges' was destroyed by the production. It's a fucking good song". When asked in December 1967 by Melody Maker about the song's disappointing chart run, Barrett replied he "couldn't care less really. All we can do is make records which we like. If the kids don't, then they won't buy it. All middle men are bad."

Around this time, the mental health of guitarist Syd Barrett was being called into question by the band; he was often unresponsive and would not play, leading to the cancellation of several performances and Pink Floyd's first US tour. In December 1967, reaching a crisis point with Barrett, Pink Floyd added the guitarist David Gilmour as the fifth member. (Note: In late 1967, Barrett suggested adding four new members; in the words of Waters: "two freaks he'd met somewhere. One of them played the banjo, the other the saxophone ... [and] a couple of chick singers".) According to Jenner, the group planned that Gilmour would "cover for [Barrett's] eccentricities". When this proved unworkable, "Syd was just going to write. Just to try to keep him involved." (Note: One of Gilmour's first tasks was to mime Barrett's guitar playing on an "Apples and Oranges" promotional film.)

For two days from 10 January 1968, Pink Floyd reconvened at EMI Studios, attempting to work on older tracks: Waters' vocals and keyboardist Richard Wright's organ were overdubbed onto "Set the Controls for the Heart of the Sun", while drummer Nick Mason added vocals to "Scream Thy Last Scream".

From 12 January till the 20th, Pink Floyd performed briefly as a five-piece. Gilmour played and sang while Barrett wandered around on stage, occasionally joining in with the playing. Between these gigs, the group rehearsed new songs written by Waters on 15 and 16 January. During the next session, on 18 January, the band jammed on rhythm tracks, joined by Smith; (Note: This jamming later formed the intro to "Let There Be More Light".) Barrett did not attend. On 24 and 25 January, they recorded a song logged as "The Most Boring Song I've Ever Heard Bar 2" at EMI. (Note: This song later became "See-Saw".) The band recorded "Let There Be More Light", "Corporal Clegg" (which features lead vocals by Mason), and "See-Saw", all without Barrett, though manager Andrew King said Barrett performed the slide solo at the end of "Let There Be More Light".

On 26 January 1968, when the band was driving to a show at Southampton University, they decided not to pick up Barrett. Barrett was finally ousted in late January 1968, leaving the band to finish the album without him. "Set the Controls for the Heart of the Sun" is the only song on which all five band members appeared. With Barrett removed from the sessions, the band struggled to come up with new material, but in February 1968 recorded Wright's "It Would Be So Nice" and Waters' "Julia Dream". (Note: Originally titled "Doreen's Dream".) In early February, it was announced Waters’ track "Corporal Clegg" would be the next single; however, due to pressure from the label, the song was earmarked for the album, and "It Would Be So Nice" was released in April, (Note: The single was released on 12 April 1968, almost a week after Barrett's departure from the band was announced.) with "Julia Dream" on the B-side. The single failed to make the charts.

Throughout April, the band took stock of their work. Waters blocked "Vegetable Man" (Note: Peter Jenner, one of the band's managers, said Waters blocked "Vegetable Man" because "it was too dark".) and "Scream Thy Last Scream" from the album. Years later, Nick Mason offered the following opinion on the two tracks not being included in the album: "they were initially intended to be potential singles, but were never satisfactorily finished. Both of these had vocals from me included in the mix, which may have had some bearing on the matter." In lieu of the two songs, the band retained "Jugband Blues" and "Set the Controls for the Heart of the Sun". Without enough material to fill an album, the band started putting together music that became the title track. Mason and Waters planned it out as if it were an architectural design, including peaks and troughs. Smith did not approve, telling them they had to stick to three-minute songs. On 25 June, the band recorded another session for the BBC radio show Top Gear, including two tracks from the album: the session featured two tracks from Saucerful: "Let There Be More Light" and an abridged version of the title track, "The Massed Gadgets of Hercules".

== Writing and music ==
Unlike The Piper at the Gates of Dawn, which was dominated by Barrett's songs, A Saucerful of Secrets contains only one Barrett song: "Jugband Blues". Ritchie Unterberger of AllMusic assessed that with A Saucerful of Secrets, "the band begin to map out the dark and repetitive pulses that would characterize their next few records." He described the sound as "spacy, ethereal material" that still "retain[ed the] gentle, fairy-tale ambience" of the previous album.

With Barrett seemingly detached from proceedings, it fell to Waters and Wright to provide adequate material. The opening, "Let There Be More Light", written by Waters, continues the space rock approach established by Barrett on their debut LP on songs like "Astronomy Domine" and "Interstellar Overdrive". "Let There Be More Light" evolved from a bass riff that was part of "Interstellar Overdrive". Both "Remember a Day" and "See-Saw" use a similar whimsical approach that Barrett had also established on their debut. Wright remained critical of his early contributions to the band.

"Set the Controls for the Heart of the Sun" was first performed with Barrett in 1967. The success of the track was such that it remained in their live setlist until 1973 where it appeared in a greatly extended form. Waters later performed the track during solo concerts from 1984 and later. Waters borrowed the lyrics from a book of Chinese poetry from the Tang dynasty, like Barrett had used in "Chapter 24".

"Corporal Clegg" is the first Pink Floyd song to address the theme of war, a prevalent theme throughout Waters' songwriting for the band, culminating on the 1983 album The Final Cut.

"A Saucerful of Secrets" was originally written as a new version of "Nick's Boogie". The track is titled as four parts on Ummagumma. A staple in the band's live set until summer 1972, a live version of the song was recorded on 27 April 1969 at the Mothers Club in Birmingham for inclusion on Ummagumma.

"Jugband Blues" is often thought to refer to Barrett's departure from the group ("It's awfully considerate of you to think of me here / And I'm most obliged to you for making it clear that I'm not here"). A promotional video was recorded for the track. The band's management wanted to release the song as a single, but it was vetoed by the band and Smith.

=== Unreleased songs ===
As well as "Jugband Blues", the album was to include "Vegetable Man", another Barrett song. The song was to appear on a single as the B-side to Barrett's "Scream Thy Last Scream". The band performed "Jugband Blues", "Vegetable Man" and "Scream Thy Last Scream" for a Top Gear session, recorded on 20 December 1967, and broadcast on the 31st. Two additional Barrett songs, "In the Beechwoods", and "No Title" (frequently referred to on bootlegs as "Sunshine"), (Note: Not to be confused with the early title of "Remember a Day", as written on the recorded sheet, "Sunshine".) were recorded early in the album sessions. After years of only being available via bootlegs, "Vegetable Man", "Scream Thy Last Scream", and "In the Beechwoods" were officially released on The Early Years 1965–1972 compilation. At least one other song, "John Latham", was recorded during these sessions and has been released.

== Artwork ==
A Saucerful of Secrets was the first of several Pink Floyd album covers created by the design group Hipgnosis. After the Beatles, it was the second time that EMI had permitted one of their acts to hire outside designers for an album jacket. The cover, designed by Storm Thorgerson, contains an image of Doctor Strange from issue #158 of the comic book Strange Tales, illustrated by Marie Severin.

== Release and reception ==
Professional ratings
Review scores
Source	Rating
AllMusic	3.5/5 stars
The Daily Telegraph	3/5 stars
The Great Rock Discography	8/10
Encyclopedia of Popular Music	3/5 stars
MusicHound	2/5
Paste	8.3/10
The Rolling Stone Album Guide	3/5 stars
Sputnikmusic	4.5/5 stars
Tom Hull	A−
The Encyclopedia of Popular Music	3/5 stars

The album was released in the UK on 28 June 1968 on EMI's Columbia label, reaching number 9 in the UK charts. It was released in the US by the Tower Records division of Capitol, where it was the only Pink Floyd album not to chart until 2019, when it peaked at 158. When reissued as A Nice Pair with the original version of The Piper at the Gates of Dawn after the success of The Dark Side of the Moon, however, the album did chart at number 36 on the Billboard 200. "Let There Be More Light" was released as a single, backed with "Remember a Day", in the US on 19 August 1968. Rolling Stone was unfavourable, writing that the album was "not as interesting as their first" and "rather mediocre", highlighting the reduced contributions from Barrett. In recent years via The Rolling Stone Album Guide, it was given an updated rating of three stars, which indicates a positive rating.

The stereo mix of the album was first released on CD in 1988, and in 1992 was digitally remastered and reissued as part of the Shine On box set. The remastered stereo CD was released on its own in 1994 in the UK and the US. The mono version of the album has never been officially released on CD. The stereo mix was remastered and re-issued in 2011 by Capitol/EMI as part of the Discovery series, and again in 2016 by Sony Music under the Pink Floyd Records label. The mono mix was reissued on vinyl for Record Store Day in April 2019 by Sony Music and Warner Music Group under the Pink Floyd Records label. The album finally charted on the Billboard 200 as a standalone peaking at No. 158 when the mono mix was re-released for Record Store Day.

In a retrospective review for AllMusic, Richie Unterberger draws attention to the album's "gentle, fairy-tale ambience", with songs that move from "concise and vivid" to "spacy, ethereal material with lengthy instrumental passages". In a review for BBC Music, Daryl Easlea said Saucerful was "not without filler", adding that "Jugband Blues" was "the most chilling" song on the album.

In 2014, Mason named A Saucerful of Secrets his favourite Pink Floyd album: "I think there are ideas contained there that we have continued to use all the way through our career. I think [it] was a quite good way of marking Syd's departure and Dave's arrival. It's rather nice to have it on one record, where you get both things. It's a cross-fade rather than a cut."

== Track listing ==
Side one
No.	Title	Writer(s)	Lead vocals	Length
1.	"Let There Be More Light"	Roger Waters	Richard Wright and David Gilmour	5:38
2.	"Remember a Day"	Wright	Wright	4:33
3.	"Set the Controls for the Heart of the Sun"	Waters	Waters	5:28
4.	"Corporal Clegg"	Waters	Gilmour, Nick Mason and Wright	4:12
Total length:				19:52

Side two
No.	Title	Writer(s)	Lead vocals	Length
5.	"A Saucerful of Secrets" I. "Something Else" (3:57) II. "Syncopated Pandemonium" (3:07) III. "Storm Signal" (1:34) IV. "Celestial Voices" (3:19)	Waters, Wright, Mason, Gilmour	instrumental, wordless vocals by Gilmour and Wright	11:57
6.	"See-Saw"	Wright	Wright	4:36
7.	"Jugband Blues"	Syd Barrett	Barrett	3:00
Total length:				19:33 (39:25)

== Outtakes ==
No.	Title	Length	Recorded	Status / notes
1	"Scream Thy Last Scream"	4:42	7–8 August 1967, De Lane Lea Studios, London	Intended as a single with "Vegetable Man" as the B-side, but withdrawn by EMI. Unreleased until 2016, when it appeared officially on the box set The Early Years 1965–1972.
2	"Vegetable Man"	2:29	9–11 October 1967, De Lane Lea Studios, London	Unreleased until 2016, when it appeared officially on the box set The Early Years 1965–1972.
3	"In the Beechwoods"	4:40	Summer 1967, De Lane Lea Studios, London	Instrumental outtake, unreleased until 2016 box set The Early Years 1965–1972.

== Personnel ==
Track numbers noted in parentheses below are based on CD track numbering.

Pink Floyd

- David Gilmour – guitars (all except 2 and 7), kazoo (4), vocals (1, 4)
- Nick Mason – drums (all except 2), percussion (1, 5, 6, 7), lead vocals (4), kazoo (7)
- Roger Waters – bass guitar (all tracks), percussion (3, 5), vocals
- Richard Wright – Farfisa organ (all tracks), piano (1, 2, 5, 6), Hammond organ (1, 4, 5), Mellotron (5, 6), vibraphone (3, 5), celesta (3), xylophone (6), tin whistle (7), vocals
- Syd Barrett – vocals (7), slide guitar (2), acoustic guitar (2, 7), electric guitar (3, 7, 1?) (Note: There is speculation, based on comments from former Pink Floyd manager Andrew King, that Syd Barrett may have contributed the guitar solo to "Let There Be More Light" (1), though this remains unconfirmed due to lack of definitive documentation.)

Additional personnel

- Norman Smith – producer, drums (2), backing vocals (2, 6),
- The Stanley Myers Orchestra – (4)
- The Salvation Army (The International Staff Band) – brass section (7)

== Charts ==
1969 weekly chart performance for A Saucerful of Secrets
Chart (1968)	Peak position
UK Albums (Official Charts)	9

2006 weekly chart performance for A Saucerful of Secrets
Chart (2006)	Peak position
Italian Albums (FIMI)	24

2011 weekly chart performance for A Saucerful of Secrets
Chart (2011)	Peak position
French Albums (SNEP)	166

2016 weekly chart performance for A Saucerful of Secrets
Chart (2016)	Peak position
German Albums (Offizielle Top 100)	57

2019 weekly chart performance for A Saucerful of Secrets
Chart (2019)	Peak position
US Billboard 200	158

2022 weekly chart performance for A Saucerful of Secrets
Chart (2022)	Peak position
Hungarian Albums (MAHASZ)	35

== Certifications ==
Certifications for A Saucerful of Secrets
Region	Certification	Certified units/sales
Italy (FIMI) sales since 2009	Gold	25,000^{‡}
United Kingdom (BPI) 1994 release	Gold	100,000^{‡}
^{‡} Sales+streaming figures based on certification alone.
