= The Gnome =

Song by Syd Barrett

Single by Pink Floyd

from the album The Piper at the Gates of Dawn
- A-side: "Flaming"
- Released: 2 November 1967
- Recorded: 19 March 1967
- Studio: Abbey Road, London, UK
- Genre: Psychedelic folk; novelty; experimental
- Length: 2:13
- Label: Columbia (EMI) (UK); Tower (US)
- Songwriter: Syd Barrett
- Producer: Norman Smith

"The Gnome" is a song by the English rock band Pink Floyd. Written by Syd Barrett, it is the eighth song on their 1967 debut album, The Piper at the Gates of Dawn. The song takes place in a fictional gnome world from the perspective of a gnome.

== Background ==
The song tells the tale of a scarlet tunic wearing gnome named Grimble Gromble. The lyrics ostensibly "came off the top [of Barrett's] head". They may have been influenced by The Little Grey Men, which was one of Barrett's favourite books. "The Gnome" was included on the B-side of the US Pink Floyd single "Flaming" (Tower 378), which was never released in the UK.

== Personnel ==
- Syd Barrett – acoustic guitar, 12-string acoustic guitar, lead vocals
- Roger Waters – bass guitar, backing vocals
- Richard Wright – celesta, vibraphone, backing vocals
- Nick Mason – temple blocks, cymbal
