= Vegetable Man =

2016 song by Pink Floyd

Song by Pink Floyd

from the album The Early Years 1965–1972
- Released: 11 November 2016
- Recorded: 9–11 October 1967
- Genre: Psychedelic; garage rock
- Length: 2:32
- Songwriter: Syd Barrett
- Producer: Norman Smith

Official audio
- "Vegetable Man" (2010 mix) on YouTube

"Vegetable Man" is a song by the English rock band Pink Floyd, written by the frontman, Syd Barrett, and recorded in 1967. It was considered for release as a single or for inclusion on their second album, A Saucerful of Secrets, but went unreleased. Bootlegged for decades, the song did not have an official release until 2016, when it was included on the box set The Early Years 1965–1972.

== Recording and consideration ==
The song was recorded from 9 to 11 October 1967. The first take ends with 15 seconds of laughter from the band, while a different take is a faster-paced jam of the song. The song was an attempt to record a follow-up single to "See Emily Play", as well as the beginning of sessions for the album that would eventually become A Saucerful of Secrets. Among the songs considered were "Paint Box", "Scream Thy Last Scream", "Jugband Blues" and "Apples and Oranges". "Vegetable Man" was scheduled for release, as the B-side to "Scream Thy Last Scream", but cancelled, and both tracks remained unreleased until 2016. Eventually, "Apples and Oranges" was chosen for the single release instead, with "Paint Box" as the B-side and "Jugband Blues" appearing on their next album A Saucerful of Secrets. The band played "Vegetable Man" live for a BBC radio broadcast on 20 December 1967.

Peter Jenner wanted the song released: "I always thought they should be put out, so I let my copies be heard. I knew that Roger would never let them out, or Dave. They somehow felt they were a bit indecent, like putting out nude pictures of a famous actress: it just wasn't cricket. But I thought they were good songs and great pieces of art. They're disturbing, and not a lot of fun, but they're some of Syd's finest work – though God knows, I wouldn't wish anyone to go through what he's gone through to get to those songs. They're like Van Gogh." Producer Malcolm Jones (who produced Barrett's The Madcap Laughs solo album) remixed this song and "Scream Thy Last Scream" for inclusion on the Barrett rarities album Opel (1988); however, the band blocked its inclusion.

== Composition ==
Jenner says Barrett wrote the song describing himself as he sat at Jenner's home, "He had to go and record and, because a song was needed, he just wrote a description of what he was wearing at the time ..." Jenner called the track "too dark". Many cite it as a document of Barrett's apparent monumental breakdown as a recording artist and as a person. The song was written around the same time as "Jugband Blues" which is directed towards anyone within Barrett's orbit, while "Vegetable Man" is aimed at the music industry and himself. Both songs contain the same cynical humour.

== Official release ==
Although popular as a bootleg in a low quality form for decades, the song was not officially released until 2016, when it appeared on The Early Years 1965–1972 box set. The remastered version of the song was given its radio debut on BBC Radio 6 Music on 4 November 2016. It was performed live for the first time by Nick Mason's Saucerful of Secrets on their 2018 European Tour. A recording is included on their 2020 live album Live at the Roundhouse.

== Personnel ==
- Syd Barrett – guitar, lead vocals
- Richard Wright – keyboards, backing vocals
- Roger Waters – bass guitar, backing vocals
- Nick Mason – drums, percussion, backing vocals

== Cover versions ==
The Soft Boys covered this song on the 1980 EP Near the Soft Boys, and the track was included on some editions of their Underwater Moonlight album. A cover version by Scottish band the Jesus and Mary Chain originally featured as the B-side of their debut single "Upside Down" and appears on their 2008 compilation The Power of Negative Thinking: B-Sides & Rarities and the 2011 2CD/DVD reissue of Psychocandy. Canadian band Kosmos recorded the song for the 2008 tribute album Like Black Holes in the Sky: The Tribute to Syd Barrett. The Vegetable Man Project was a series of six CDs (plus a one-sided 10" single with 60 10-second excerpts) of various acts performing cover versions of the song, released by the Italian labels Oggetti Volanti Non Identificati and Yellow Shoes between 2002 and 2009. British post-punk band the Mothmen recorded a version, released on the 2015 CD reissue of their 1981 album Pay Attention.

== See also ==
- List of unreleased Pink Floyd material
