= See-Saw (song) =

Song by Pink Floyd

from the album A Saucerful of Secrets
- Released: 29 June 1968
- Recorded: 25–26 January 1968
- Studio: Abbey Road, London, UK
- Genre: Psychedelic pop
- Length: 4:37
- Label: EMI Columbia (UK); Tower (US)
- Songwriter: Richard Wright
- Producer: Norman Smith

"See-Saw" is a song by English rock band Pink Floyd and the sixth track on their second studio album A Saucerful of Secrets.

== Composition ==
It is the third Pink Floyd song written solely by Richard Wright, and features Wright on lead vocals and piano, Farfisa organ, xylophone and Mellotron. On the recording sheet, the song is listed as "The Most Boring Song I've Ever Heard Bar Two". It was recorded on the 25 and 26 January 1968 at EMI Studios. David Gilmour uses a wah-wah pedal on his electric guitar and possibly contributes backing vocals.

== Lyrics ==
It has been theorised that the song tells of a strangely troubled brother-sister relationship; the loss of a child, the sister killing the brother, from the lyrics of "Sits on a stick in the river, sister's throwing stones, hoping for a hit, he doesn't know, so then, she goes up, while he goes down"; or simply the loss of childhood, similar to the earlier song on the album "Remember a Day," which was also written and sung by Wright.

== Reception ==
In a review for A Saucerful of Secrets, Jim Miller of Rolling Stone described "See-Saw" as "a ballad scored vocally in a style incongruously reminiscent of Ronny and the Daytonas."

== Personnel ==
- Richard Wright – lead vocals, Farfisa organ, piano, Mellotron, xylophone
- David Gilmour – acoustic guitar, wah-wah electric guitar and backing vocals
- Roger Waters – bass guitar
- Nick Mason – drums, triangle, gong, tambourine, shaker
- Norman Smith – backing vocals
