= Let There Be More Light =

Song by Pink Floyd

- Japanese Picture Sleeve

Single by Pink Floyd

from the album A Saucerful of Secrets
- B-side: "Remember a Day"
- Released: 19 August 1968 (US)
- Recorded: January–May 1968
- Studio: Abbey Road Studios, London, UK
- Genre: Psychedelic rock; space rock
- Length: 5:32 (album version); 3:00 (single version)
- Label: Tower (US)
- Songwriter: Roger Waters
- Producer: Norman Smith

Pink Floyd singles chronology
"It Would Be So Nice" (1968)	"Let There Be More Light" (1968)	"Point Me at the Sky" (1968)

"Let There Be More Light" is a song by English rock band Pink Floyd and the opening track on their second album, A Saucerful of Secrets. It was also released in edited form as the fourth American single by the group.

== Lyrical themes ==
"Let There Be More Light" describes the imagined descent of a fantastical spacecraft at RAF Mildenhall, north-east of Waters' hometown of Cambridge. From 1950, RAF Mildenhall primarily supported US Air Force operations, including the Strategic Air Command.

The song shares the theme of benevolent extraterrestrial intervention in human affairs with the 1951 film The Day the Earth Stood Still and Arthur C. Clarke's 1953 novel Childhood's End. Along with "Set the Controls for the Heart of the Sun" and 1969's "Cirrus Minor", it is one of only three Waters-penned lyrics to feature science fiction themes prior to his 1992 solo album Amused to Death.

"Let There Be More Light" includes cryptic references to science fiction stories, the 11th century rebel Hereward the Wake, The Beatles' song "Lucy in the Sky with Diamonds" and one of Pink Floyd's early light show operators. While the oblique lyrics contrast with the more direct style that Waters would later adopt, the historical and popular culture references tentatively pre-figure the overt political sentiments of later Pink Floyd and Waters solo releases.

The first verse relates the realisation of an apparent prophecy that "something will be done" when a "mighty ship / Descending on a point of flame / Made contact with the human race at Mildenhall".

The second verse opens with the repeated refrain "Now ... is the time to be aware", before referring to "Carter's father". While some fans have speculated that Waters is describing John Carter of Mars, a character appearing in science fiction novels of Edgar Rice Burroughs, according to Nick Mason the lyric refers to Cambridge local, band associate and sometime lighting operator, Ian 'Pip' Carter. Carter's father, seeing the spacecraft, "knew the Rull revealed to him / The living soul of Hereward the Wake", a phrase which appears to reference both science fiction writer A. E. van Vogt's 1948 short story "The Rull" (which tells of psychological battle of wits between a human and a hostile alien with hypnotic powers) and a legendary 11th century leader of resistance to the Norman invasion of England who is believed to have roamed The Fens of Cambridgeshire.

In the third verse, the "outer lock" of the spacecraft opens to reveal "in flowing robes ... Lucy In The Sky", causing the servicemen to sigh in wonder. The fourth and final verse begins with the question "Did ... you ever know ... / Never, ever will they ascend?" before Lucy In The Sky, toes glowing, summons "his cosmic powers" and lets the "psychic emanations" flow.

== Release and live ==
A rare US single release (Tower 440) contains edited mono versions of this song and "Remember a Day". The single was also released in Japan. The single did not chart. Pink Floyd performed the song live from 1968–69, often as an encore. The song was played by Nick Mason's Saucerful of Secrets in 2018 and 2019. A recording is included on their 2020 live album Live at the Roundhouse.

Record World said that "weird meter and mood changes could be the factors to bring this record home."

== Planned B-side ==
This song was planned as a B-side to an edit of one of Pink Floyd's later songs, "Money", for 7 December 1981, but for unknown reasons, the release was cancelled by EMI.

== Personnel ==
- Richard Wright – Farfisa organ, Hammond organ, piano, lead vocals (verse sections)
- David Gilmour – electric guitars, lead vocals (chorus sections)
- Roger Waters – bass guitar, whispered vocals (verse sections)
- Nick Mason – drums, percussion

Unconfirmed

- Syd Barrett – electric guitar
