= Jugband Blues =

Song by Pink Floyd

from the album A Saucerful of Secrets
- Released: 29 June 1968
- Recorded: 19 October 1967
- Studio: De Lane Lea Studios, London
- Genre: Psychedelic folk, experimental, sound collage
- Length: 3:00 (album version); 3:52 (BBC Radio Session, 1967 version)
- Label: EMI Columbia (UK); Tower (US)
- Songwriter: Syd Barrett
- Producer: Norman Smith

"Jugband Blues" is a song by English rock band Pink Floyd, released on their second album, A Saucerful of Secrets, in 1968. Written by Syd Barrett, it was his sole compositional contribution to the album, as well as his last published for the band. Barrett and Pink Floyd's management wanted the song to be released as a single, but were vetoed by the rest of the band and producer Norman Smith.

== Background and recording ==
"Jugband Blues" was written around the same time as "Vegetable Man". Both songs contain the same cynical humour, but while on "Vegetable Man" Barrett focuses his humour on himself, on "Jugband Blues" it is directed towards those around him.

"Jugband Blues" was either wholly or partly recorded on 19 October 1967 at De Lane Lea Studios. The interview with producer Norman Smith, recorded for the DVD documentary Meddle: A Classic Album Under Review (2007), suggests that at least two separate recording sessions took place. The first session was evidently to record the basic Pink Floyd band track, which was possibly cut at EMI's Abbey Road Studios, since Smith clearly states in the interview that he was unable to use Abbey Road for the brass band session, and was obliged to book De Lane Lea Studios in Holborn instead. Smith's description of the De Lane Lea session implies that it was specifically booked to overdub the brass band onto an existing band track, and he makes no mention of the other members of the group, suggesting that only Barrett and the members of the brass band were present for this overdub session.

According to Smith, it had been his initial idea to add a brass arrangement to the basic track, which led Barrett to suggest using a Salvation Army brass band. Smith recalled that after some considerable effort he was able to contract the eight-piece Salvation Army International Staff Band for the session, which was booked from 7pm to 10pm, but Barrett was almost an hour late arriving. Smith then invited Barrett to outline his musical ideas for the ensemble, but Syd told them he wanted them to simply "play whatever they want" regardless of the rest of the group. Dismayed, Smith had to insist on scored parts, and he was obliged to sketch out an arrangement himself -- according to his account, Barrett walked out of the studio shortly afterwards and did not return. In the interview Smith also specifically mentions playing an existing version of the track for the brass players, to give them some idea of what they were expected to play. About The Salvation Army, band manager Andrew King said that Barrett "wanted a massive Salvation Army freak-out, but that's the only time I can remember Norman [Smith] putting his foot down." The song features a distinctive three-tiered structure: starting off in 3/4 meter, then into 2/4 and finishing off in 4/4.

== Video ==
Barrett in the music video.

The promotional video for the song was filmed in December 1967, for the Central Office of Information in London. The COI used the video for a promotional film about Britain, and was meant to be distributed in the US and Canada. The video features Barrett (shown with an acoustic guitar for the first time) and the group miming to the song in a more conventional stage setting, with psychedelic projections in the background. The original audio to the promo is lost, and most versions use the BBC recording from late 1967, (Note: The band recorded a performance on 20 December 1967, broadcast on the 31st, for BBC Radio's Top Gear, presented by John Peel and Tommy Vance. The version of "Jugband Blues" recorded here, differs from the Saucerful version: The radio version features harmonies in the final section, Wright using a church sound-alike organ, and the band loses The Salvation Army but retains the kazoo.) consequently causing sync issues most evident as Barrett sings the opening verse. The original film was considered to be lost, until it was re-discovered in the Manchester Arts Lab in 1999. Barrett and Waters first watched the promo video during the second week of December 1967.

== Reception ==
In a contemporary negative review for A Saucerful of Secrets, Jim Miller of Rolling Stone asserts that "Jugband Blues" "hardly does any credit to Barrett's credentials as a composer."

== Legacy ==
Barrett, along with Pink Floyd's managers, Peter Jenner and King, wanted to release the song as a single in the new year, before being vetoed by both the band and Norman Smith. Jenner said that "Jugband Blues", along with two others that Syd wrote around this time, ("Scream Thy Last Scream" and "Vegetable Man") were "amazing songs." When compared to "Bike" and "The Scarecrow", Jenner said "You think, 'Well, OK, those are all right, but these are powerful disturbing art.' I wouldn't want anyone to have to go as mad and disturbed as Syd did to get that, but if you are going to go that disturbed give me something like that. That's great art." Jenner had also called "Jugband Blues" "an extraordinary song, the ultimate self-diagnosis on a state of schizophrenia, [and] the portrait of a nervous breakdown."

Barrett, by the beginning of the recording sessions for A Saucerful of Secrets, was already shrinking into a delirious state of mind, exacerbated by his feelings of alienation from the rest of the band. The common interpretation of the lyrics is that they reflect his schizophrenia and it has been argued that they could also be read as a criticism of the other band members for forcing him out. King said of the song: "The most alienated, extraordinary lyrics. It's not addressed to the band, it's addressed to the whole world. He was completely cut off." Jenner said "I think every psychiatrist should be made to listen to those songs ["Jugband Blues", "Scream Thy Last Scream" and "Vegetable Man"]. I think they should be part of the curriculum of every medical college along with those Van Gogh paintings like The Cows."

"Jugband Blues" is one of two songs (the other being "Set the Controls for the Heart of the Sun") from A Saucerful of Secrets that were later included on the compilation album Echoes: The Best of Pink Floyd. The song was preceded on the compilation by "Wish You Were Here", with lyrics by Roger Waters written in tribute to Barrett. The band Opal released a cover of the song on the Barrett tribute album Beyond the Wildwood in 1987.

== Personnel ==
- Syd Barrett – acoustic guitar, electric guitar, lead vocals
- Richard Wright – Farfisa organ, tin whistle
- Roger Waters – bass guitar
- Nick Mason – drums, castanets, kazoo

with:

- The Salvation Army International Staff Band

Ray Bowes (cornet), Terry Camsey (cornet), Mac Carter (trombone), Les Condon (E♭ bass), Maurice Cooper (euphonium), Ian Hankey (trombone), George Whittingham (B♭ bass), plus one other uncredited musician.
