= Set the Controls for the Heart of the Sun =

1968 song by Pink Floyd

Song by Pink Floyd

from the album A Saucerful of Secrets
- Released: 29 June 1968
- Recorded: 8 August 1967, January – February 1968
- Studio: Abbey Road Studios, London, UK
- Genre: Space rock; psychedelia; avant-garde
- Length: 5:27 (A Saucerful of Secrets version); 9:27 (Ummagumma live version); 10:32 (Live At Pompeii version)
- Label: EMI Columbia (UK), Tower (US)
- Songwriter: Roger Waters
- Producer: Norman Smith

Official audio
- Set the Controls for the Heart of the Sun on YouTube

"Set the Controls for the Heart of the Sun" is a song by the English rock band Pink Floyd, appearing on their second album, A Saucerful of Secrets (1968). It was written by Roger Waters, taking lyrics from a Chinese poetry book, and features a drum part by Nick Mason played with timpani mallets. It also is the only song recorded by Pink Floyd to feature material from all five band members, as there are several different guitar parts recorded by both David Gilmour and Syd Barrett, albeit buried in the mix.

The song was regularly performed between 1967 and 1973 and can be heard on the live disc of the 1969 album Ummagumma and seen in the 1972 movie Pink Floyd: Live at Pompeii. Waters has also played the song on several solo tours, as has Mason.

== Composition and recording ==
The song was written by Roger Waters in mid-1967, who came up with a riff over which he could sing a melody within his vocal range. One of the group's managers, Peter Jenner said it was the first song that Waters wrote that he thought was a similar quality to those by Syd Barrett.

Waters borrowed the lyrics from a book of Chinese poetry from the Tang dynasty (which was later identified as the book Poems of the late T'ang, translated by A. C. Graham). The title was derived from the 1965 novel The Fireclown by Michael Moorcock. Among the borrowed lines from Chinese poetry (as translated by Graham) were those written by Li He, whose poem "Don't Go Out of the Door" contains the line "Witness the man who raved at the wall as he wrote his questions to Heaven" (公看呵壁書問天); and Li Shangyin, whose poetry contained the lines "watch little by little the night turns around" (暫見夜闌干), "countless the twigs which tremble in dawn" (撼曉幾多枝) and "one inch of love is one inch of ashes" (一寸相思一寸灰).

Recording started on 8 August 1967 at Abbey Road Studios, including the lead vocal on 23 October, and overdubs continuing through to January and February 1968. According to guitarist David Gilmour, the studio version of the song contains minor guitar work both from him and Syd Barrett, making "Set the Controls for the Heart of the Sun" the only Pink Floyd song that features all five band members. Keyboardist Richard Wright made prominent use of the Farfisa organ, and also played vibraphone on the track. Drummer Nick Mason enjoyed recording the track as it allowed him to emulate Chico Hamilton's drumming on "Blue Sands", using mallets, as seen in the 1958 film Jazz on a Summer's Day.

== Release ==
The track was planned for release as a single, with "Scream Thy Last Scream", on 8 September, before this was vetoed by the band's record company, EMI. It is one of two songs from A Saucerful of Secrets which appear on the 2001 compilation album Echoes: The Best of Pink Floyd (the other being "Jugband Blues").

== Reception ==
In a negative review of A Saucerful of Secrets, Jim Miller of Rolling Stone described "Set the Controls for the Heart of the Sun", along with "Let There Be More Light", as "boring melodically, harmonically, and lyrically." Miller further described the production work as "not as glittery as the first album's, and the instrumental work is shoddy and routine. Miller also described the track as too long.

Mason later gave a positive view of the song, saying it was "the most interesting ... in relation to what we were doing at the time".

== Live performances ==
Pink Floyd performed the song from 1967 to 1973. A performance on 9 September 1967 featured Barrett and Waters switching guitars. The group's performance of the song on 27 April 1969 at Mother's, Birmingham and on 2 May 1969 at the Manchester College of Commerce was used for the live half of the double album Ummagumma. On 27 February 1971, a live performance of "Set the Controls" was filmed for ORTF, while a performance in Studio Europanisor, Paris, was filmed for Live at Pompeii. During these performances, the song was significantly extended with a range of dynamics, including a free-form middle section. The last documented performance by the group was on 13 October 1973 at the Wiener Stadthalle, Vienna.

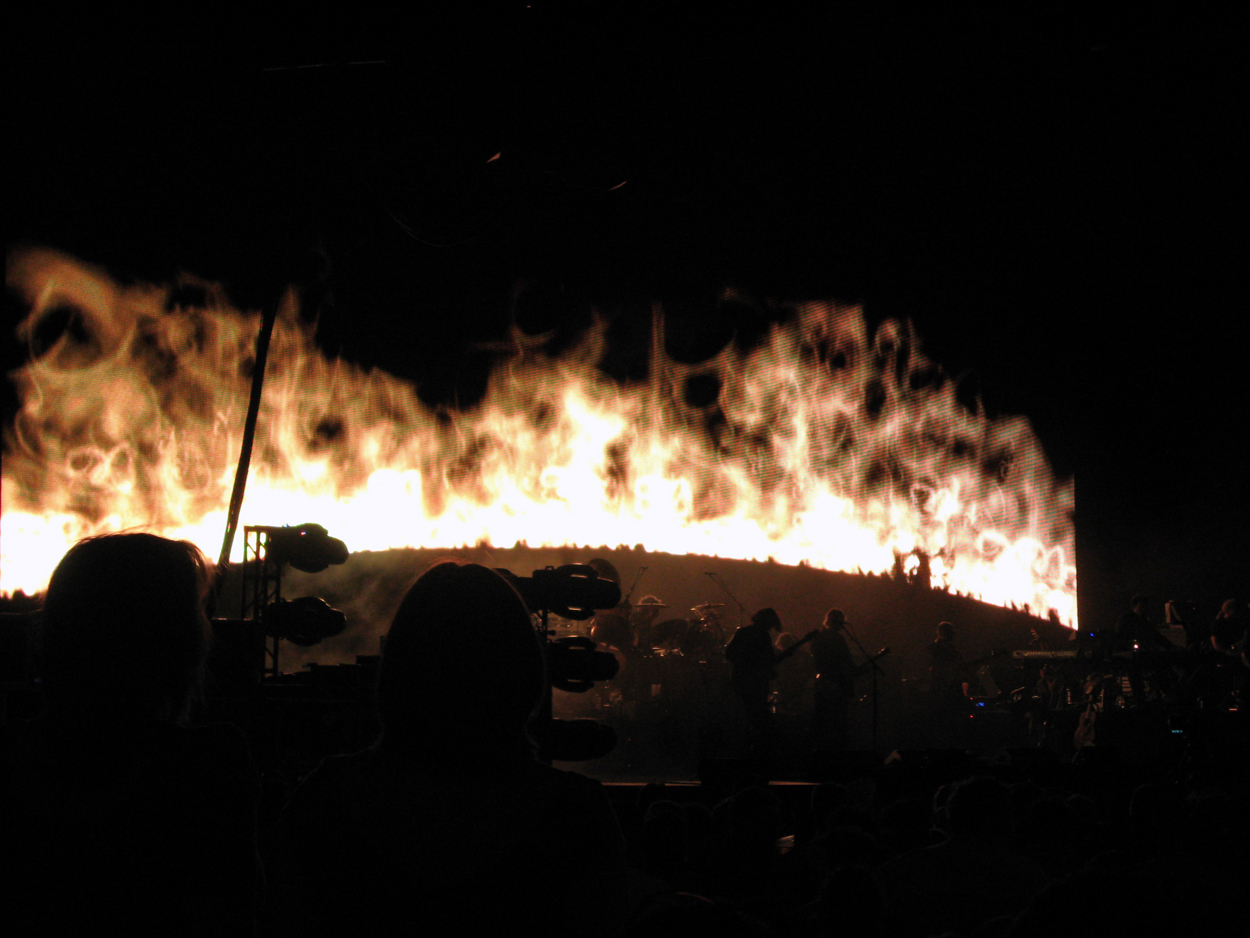
Waters performing the track on his The Dark Side of the Moon Live tour

The song has been a staple of Waters' solo tours. It was the opening song on 1984–1985 tours promoting The Pros and Cons of Hitch Hiking in a radically rearranged form, with female backing vocals, saxophone solos and a guitar solo (and even a shakuhachi solo in 1985). A truncated version (just the three verses) of the song, featuring a simple acoustic guitar part, was performed at a handful of the Radio K.A.O.S shows in 1987. The song was included in the setlist for his 1999–2002 In the Flesh tour, with stills from the promotional videos of "Arnold Layne" and "The Scarecrow" projected on large screens. This version – featuring a psychedelic guitar solo by Snowy White, and a sax solo – appears on Waters' 2000 In the Flesh – Live DVD and live album. In June 2002, Waters' former Pink Floyd bandmate Mason performed as guest drummer on the track for two nights at London's Wembley Arena, the first indication of a reconciliation following the acrimonious split of the mid-1980s. It was also performed at Waters' 2006–2008 tour.

In 2016, Waters included the song in his concerts at the Zocalo Square and Foro Sol in Mexico, and the Desert Trip festival in the United States, but it was dropped from the setlist of his 2017 Us + Them Tour.

The song was played by Nick Mason's Saucerful of Secrets in 2018, 2019 and 2022. A recording is included on their 2020 live album Live at the Roundhouse. For the 18 April 2019 show in New York City, Waters performed lead vocals. "I really like playing 'Set the Controls'…'" Mason noted, "which is an unusual drum part, played with mallets rather than sticks."

== Popular culture ==
The song gave Douglas Adams the idea for a rock band called Disaster Area, in his book The Restaurant at the End of the Universe. The band planned to crash a space ship into a nearby star as a stunt during a concert.

A rock climb at Twll Mawr, in Gwynedd, North Wales has been named after the song.

The LCD Soundsystem song "All My Friends" includes the lyric, "We set controls for the heart of the sun, one of the ways we show our age."

The lyrics of the song "Please Hold on While the Train Is Moving" on the album The Grand Theatre, Volume One by the rock group Old 97's contains many references to other songs, including the line, "Set the controls for the heart of the sun."

== Personnel ==
- Roger Waters – vocals, bass guitar, gong
- Richard Wright – Farfisa organ, vibraphone, celesta
- Nick Mason – drums (played with timpani mallets)
- Syd Barrett – electric guitar
- David Gilmour – electric guitar
