= Remember a Day =

1968 song by Pink Floyd

Single by Pink Floyd

from the album A Saucerful of Secrets
- A-side: "Let There Be More Light"
- Released: 19 August 1968 (US)
- Recorded: 9 May & October 1967
- Studio: De Lane Lea Studios, London
- Genre: Psychedelic rock; space rock; psychedelic pop
- Length: 2:40 (single version); 4:33 (album version)
- Label: Tower
- Songwriter: Richard Wright
- Producer: Norman Smith

Pink Floyd singles chronology
"It Would Be So Nice" (1968)	"Remember a Day" (1968)	"Point Me at the Sky" (1968)

Music video
- "Remember A Day ('Samedi et Compagnie')" on YouTube

"Remember a Day" is a song by the English rock band Pink Floyd, written and sung by their keyboardist Richard Wright, appearing on their second album, A Saucerful of Secrets (1968). It was performed by Pink Floyd only once, as an encore in May 1968; it was subsequently performed by David Gilmour in September 2008 in memory of Wright, who had recently died of cancer, on Later... with Jools Holland, and by Nick Mason during his Saucerful of Secrets tour. The lyrics center around nostalgia for the lost paradise of early childhood.

== Recording ==
The song, written and sung by Wright, was recorded during two different sessions. During the first session (May 1967), Wright's vocals, piano, and Farfisa organ were recorded and during the second session (October 1967) Syd Barrett's acoustic and slide guitar as well as the bass and drum sections were recorded at De Lane Lea Studios in London. The sessions also produced "Jugband Blues".

During the sessions for the song, drummer Nick Mason became agitated that he could not come up with the right drum part for the song. Producer Norman Smith, however, knew what he wanted with the drums, so he played the part himself. Mason described this in his memoir: "'Remember A Day' had a different drum feel to our usual pounding style, and I eventually relinquished the playing to Norman. I really didn't like giving up my drum stool—and never have—but in this particular instance I would have struggled to provide a similar feel. Re-listening to this it feels more like a Norman Smith track than anyone else's. Apart from the rather un-Floyd-like arrangement, Norman's voice is also prominent within the backing vocals."

Andrew King, Pink Floyd's manager, recalls: "I remember De Lane Lea ... we did 'Vegetable Man' there ... and 'Remember a Day', which Syd does a guitar solo on."

In 1968 Barrett wrote: "I was self-taught and my only group was Pink Floyd. I was not featured on 'Corporal Clegg' but did play on another track written by Richard Wright. I forget the title but it had a steel guitar in the background. There have been complications regarding the LP but it is now almost finished and should be issued by EMI in a few months. I now spend most of my time writing."

== Release and aftermath ==
A rare United States single release (Tower 440) contains edited mono versions of this and the song before it in the album, "Let There Be More Light". This single was never released in the United Kingdom, although it was intended to be a single before being replaced by "Apples and Oranges".

An instrumental version of the studio version appeared in the film of the same name, Remember a Day.

In 1971, "Remember a Day" was included on the compilation album Relics.

=== Reception ===
In a negative review for A Saucerful of Secrets, Jim Miller of Rolling Stone described "Remember a Day" as "inoffensive, but features some rather miserable bottleneck guitar, second rate piano, and empty-sounding acoustic guitar work." Miller further described the drumming as "busy and ineffective."

=== Later performances ===
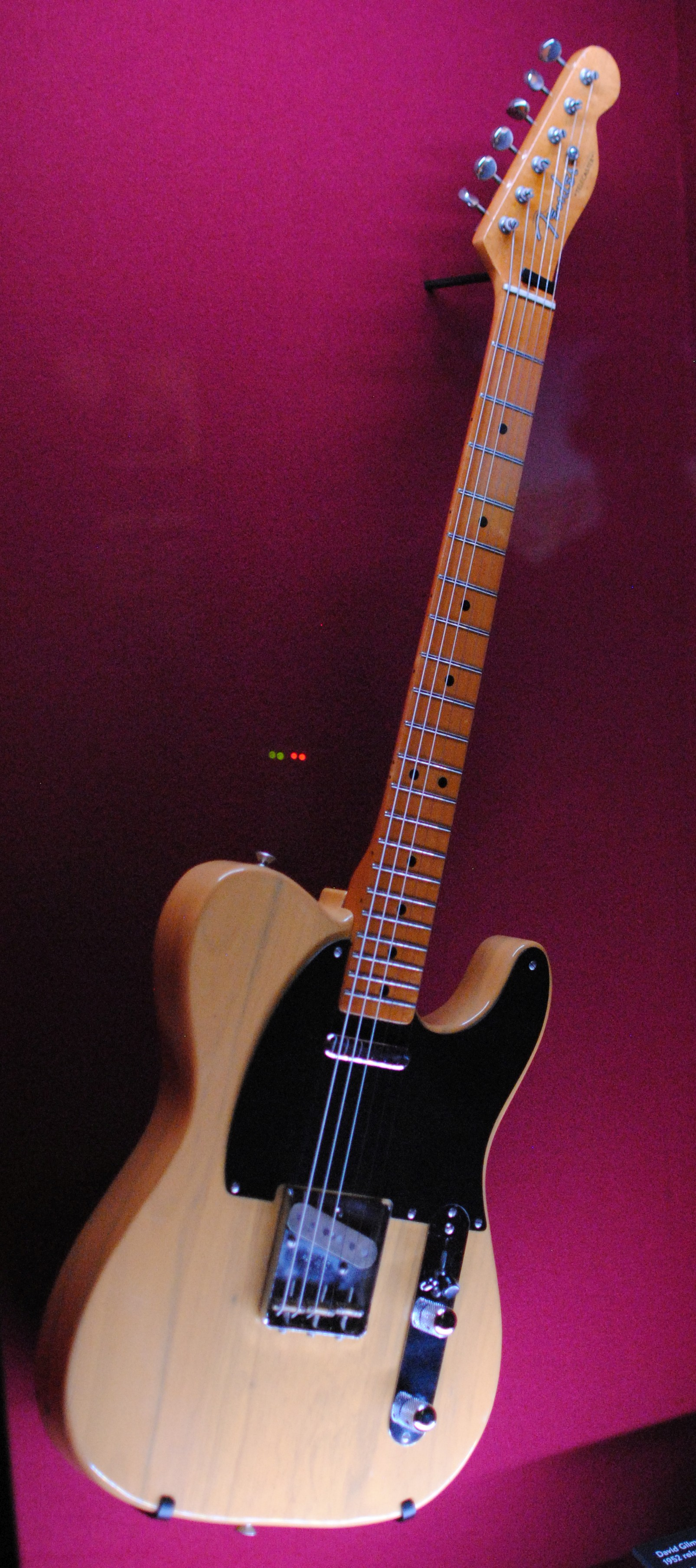
For 'Later...', Gilmour played the song on his 'Fender Telecaster 52V', a 1982 reissue of the 1952 original; seen here displayed at the Pink Floyd: Their Mortal Remains exhibition.

On 23 September 2008, David Gilmour performed the song on a live broadcast of Later... with Jools Holland on BBC Two as a tribute to Richard Wright, who had died eight days earlier. In an interview later in the show, Gilmour said that Wright had intended to perform with him that day, but had sent Gilmour an SMS message a couple of weeks before his death to advise him that he would not be well enough to attend. This was the first live performance of the song since 1968 by any member of the band, although none of the original lineup that recorded the song took part in the performance. Gilmour's band comprised Phil Manzanera, Guy Pratt, Jon Carin and Steve DiStanislao.

Gilmour and Nick Mason also played the song at Wright's memorial service, which took place at Notting Hill Theatre.

Mason has since performed the song live, with his band Nick Mason's Saucerful of Secrets. A recording is included on their 2020 live album Live at the Roundhouse.

== Personnel ==
- Richard Wright – piano, Farfisa organ, lead and backing vocals
- Syd Barrett – slide guitar, acoustic guitar
- Roger Waters – bass
- Norman Smith – drums, backing vocals
