= Chapter 24 (song) =

Song by Pink Floyd

from the album The Piper at the Gates of Dawn
- Released: 5 August 1967
- Recorded: 27 February 1967 (or 15 March 1967)
- Genre: Psychedelic pop
- Length: 3:42
- Label: EMI Columbia (UK); Tower (US)
- Songwriter: Syd Barrett
- Producer: Norman Smith

"Chapter 24" is a song by the English rock band Pink Floyd released on their 1967 album The Piper at the Gates of Dawn. This song was one of several to be considered for the band's "best of" album, Echoes: The Best of Pink Floyd. It was the second song recorded for the album.

== Composition ==
It was written by Syd Barrett and its lyrics are inspired by text from chapter 24 of the ancient Chinese tome I Ching (The Book of Changes).

=== I Ching ===
Fû hexagram

The translation Barrett referenced is not known, but phrases from the lyric can be found in the Richard Wilhelm and Cary Baynes translation of 1950, and the Legge translation of 1899. The former is more poetic, but the latter has greater detail. Chapter 24 explains the significance of the Fû (复, means "returning") hexagram.

- "All movement is accomplished in six stages..." – The lyric's opening line appears to be taken from the I Ching's instructions for performing a divination, which is accomplished in six stages, one for each row of the hexagram, and is used to select a hexagram and its corresponding chapter. These are words from the Richard Wilhelm translation into German, rendered into English by Cary F. Baynes. The German text from Wilhelms comment to the judgement is (I Ging. Das Buch der Wandlungen. Eugen Diederichs Verlag, Jena 1924): "Alle Bewegungen vollziehen sich in sechs Stufen. Die siebente Stufe bringt dann die Wiederkehr." and Baynes translates: "All movements are accomplished in six stages, and the seventh brings return." (see also the next line).
- "...and the seventh brings return..." – A significant theme of this chapter is that the subject may freely come and go without great trouble, although the last row of the hexagram (the top row) takes the contrary position. A journey lasting six days is implied, and "in seven days comes his return" (Legge translation).
- "...for seven is the number of the young light..." – In the German text, Wilhelm writes in his comment to the judgement: "Darum ist die Sieben die Zahl des jungen Lichts, die dadurch entsteht, dass die Sechs, die Zahl des grossen Dunkels, sich um eins steigert." and Baynes translates literally: "Therefore seven is the number of the young light, and it arises when six, the number of the great darkness, is increased by one." "Young light" may also refer to the sun at winter solstice (see below).1 As the lines in the hexagrams of the I Ching are seen ascending from below, the "young light" is the first (unbroken) line at the bottom. In his comments to the judgement of chapter 24 in the third book of the I Ching, Richard Wilhelm explains: "Nachdem die Kraft des Lichten im Zeichen Gou (Nr. 44, das Entgegenkommen) abzunehmen beginnt, kommt sie im Zeichen Fu nach sieben Wandlungen wieder." which corresponds in English to: "After the power of light starts to wane in the sign Kou (No. 44, Coming to Meet) it returns in the sign Fu (No. 24, Return / The Turning Point) after seven changes."
- "...change returns success..." – The first line of the Wilhelm and Baynes translation is: "Return. Success." – a summary of the Fû hexagram.
- "...going and coming without error..." – This references "going in and coming out without error" (from Wilhelm and Baynes, second line of the translation), and refers to the meaning of the third row of the hexagram, counting from the bottom (from Legge).
- "...action brings good fortune..." – The first and second rows (from the bottom) both indicate "good fortune".
- "...sunset, sunrise..." (latter word added in repeats of the chorus) – This refers to winter solstice (see next line): the longest night of the year, the greatest length of time between sunset and sunrise.
- "The time is with the month of winter solstice, when the change is due to come..." – Fû also symbolizes the eleventh month, which contains the winter solstice, the shortest day of the year, when the length of daylight changes from becoming shorter each day, to longer each day.
- "...thunder in the other course of heaven..." – Each hexagram can also be viewed as two trigrams: the bottom three rows (inner trigram) and top three rows (outer trigram). Fû is composed of trigrams for thunder and earth. The lyric may inadvertently refer to chapter 25's "Wú Wàng" hexagram, composed of the trigrams for thunder and heaven. (Note: This analysis does not cover all lines of the lyric.)

== Personnel ==
- Syd Barrett – lead vocals, guitar feedback
- Richard Wright – Farfisa organ, Hohner Pianet, cello, harmonium, backing vocals
- Roger Waters – bass guitar, gong
- Nick Mason – crash cymbals, tubular bells
