= Scream Thy Last Scream =

Song by Pink Floyd

from the album The Early Years 1965–1972
- Released: 11 November 2016
- Recorded: 7–8 August 1967; 20 December 1967; 11 January 1968
- Length: 4:43
- Songwriter: Syd Barrett
- Producer: Norman Smith

"Scream Thy Last Scream" is a song by Pink Floyd, written by frontman Syd Barrett and was scheduled to be the band's next single after "See Emily Play".

Its first official release was on The Early Years 1965–1972 box set in November 2016.

== Recording ==
Only two takes are complete. It was recorded in the same sessions as "Set the Controls for the Heart of the Sun", on 7–8 August 1967.

== Music and lyrics ==
The song features several changes in tempo, a sped-up double-tracked vocal part by Barrett, while drummer Nick Mason simultaneously sings the normal part (one of only four moments he ever sang on a Floyd record), a range of bells, crowd noises, an instrumental section that continually increases in speed featuring wah-wah guitar solos and keyboards, and surreal lyrics. Barrett is only clearly audible on one line in the song, "she'll be scrubbing bubbles on all fours".

== Aborted release and other versions ==
The two tracks were arranged to be released as a single on 8 September 1967, before it was vetoed by the band's record company, EMI. The song was again scheduled for release, this time with "Vegetable Man" as the B-side, but cancelled for the second time.

"'Scream Thy Last Scream' has lead vocals by Nick Mason," noted David Gilmour in 2002. "We did actually perform that one a few times in my very early years with Pink Floyd. I don't know if they ['Scream Thy Last Scream' and 'Vegetable Man'] were ever finally mixed."

A late-Barrett era rendition was recorded live in Rotterdam in November 1967, at the Hippy-Happy Fair. Producer Malcolm Jones (who produced Barrett's The Madcap Laughs album) remixed "Vegetable Man" and "Scream Thy Last Scream", for inclusion on the Barrett rarities album Opel (1988). However, the band blocked their inclusion.

"Scream Thy Last Scream" and "Vegetable Man" appeared on many bootlegs until November 2016. The two tracks, along with others such as "Jugband Blues" and another unreleased track called "In the Beechwoods" were remixed in 2010 and also included in the Early Years box set.

A promotional video was made for the track, directed by poet Spike Hawkins. A final studio cut of "Scream Thy Last Scream" was completed along with a somewhat different BBC radio version (which features both Barrett and Mason on lead vocals) and even some live recordings. All are widely available on bootleg recordings.

== Personnel ==
- Syd Barrett – guitar, sped-up double-tracked vocals, vocals
- Roger Waters – bass guitar
- Richard Wright – Farfisa organ, Hammond organ
- Nick Mason – drums, lead vocals

== See also ==
- "Jugband Blues"
- List of unreleased songs recorded by Pink Floyd
