= Richard Wright (musician) =

English keyboardist and musician (1943–2008)

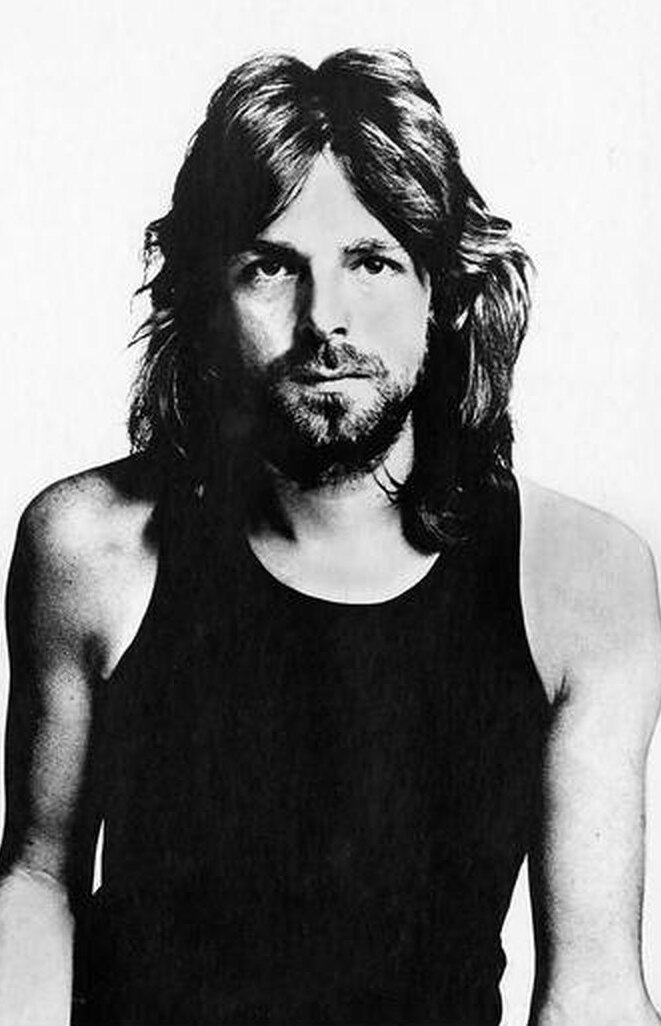
- Wright on the gatefold of Meddle in 1971

Background information
- Also known as: Rick Wright
- Born: Richard William Wright; 28 July 1943; Hatch End, Middlesex, England
- Died: 15 September 2008 (aged 65) London, England
- Genres: Progressive rock; art rock; psychedelic rock; experimental rock; electronic; jazz
- Occupations: Musician; composer; singer; songwriter
- Instruments: Keyboards; vocals
- Years active: 1962–2008
- Labels: Capitol; Columbia; EMI; Harvest
- Formerly of: Pink Floyd; Zee
- Website: rickwright.com

Richard William Wright (28 July 1943 – 15 September 2008) was an English keyboardist, singer, and songwriter who co-founded the rock band Pink Floyd. He appeared on almost every Pink Floyd album and performed on all of their tours. He was inducted into the Rock and Roll Hall of Fame in 1996 as a member of Pink Floyd.

Wright grew up in Hatch End, Middlesex, and met his future Pink Floyd bandmates Roger Waters and Nick Mason while studying architecture at the Regent Street Polytechnic, London. After being joined by frontman and songwriter Syd Barrett, Pink Floyd achieved commercial success in 1967. Barrett was replaced by David Gilmour in 1968, who, along with Waters and Wright, took over songwriting. Wright initially contributed significantly to the band as a singer-songwriter, writing and providing lead vocals on songs including "Remember a Day" and the single "It Would Be So Nice" (both 1968). Later, Wright acted mainly as an arranger on compositions by Waters and Gilmour. He began to contribute less towards the end of the 1970s and left the band after touring The Wall in 1981. He rejoined as a session musician in 1987 for A Momentary Lapse of Reason, becoming a full-time member again for The Division Bell in 1994. Sessions with Wright during this period were later released on the 2014 album The Endless River. Wright's jazz influences and distinctive keyboard playing were an important part of the Pink Floyd sound. As well as playing Farfisa and Hammond organs and Kurzweil synthesisers, he sang regularly in the band and took lead vocals on songs such as "Time" (1973) and "Wearing the Inside Out" (1994).

Wright recorded two solo studio albums and was briefly active in the pop duo Zee with Dave Harris of Fashion. Following Pink Floyd's Live 8 appearance in 2005, he became part of Gilmour's touring band. Wright died from lung cancer in London in September 2008, aged 65.

== Early life ==
Wright, whose father was head biochemist at Unigate, grew up in Hatch End, Middlesex, and was educated at the Haberdashers' Aske's School. He taught himself to play guitar, trombone, trumpet and piano at the age of 12 while recuperating from a broken leg. His mother encouraged him to concentrate on the piano. He took private lessons in music theory and composition at the Eric Gilder School of Music and became influenced by the trad jazz revival, learning the saxophone along with his other instruments, but continuing to focus on piano. In 1962, uncertain about his future, Wright enrolled at Regent Street Polytechnic (later incorporated into University of Westminster) to study architecture.

At Regent Street Polytechnic, Wright met fellow musicians Roger Waters and Nick Mason, and all three joined a band formed by their classmate Clive Metcalf called Sigma 6. Wright's position was initially tenuous, as he did not choose a definitive instrument, playing piano if a pub had one, otherwise settling on rhythm guitar or trombone.

Wright moved with Waters and Mason into a house in Stanhope Gardens, Highgate, and they began serious rehearsals to become a professional group. Although Mason and Waters were competent students, Wright found architecture of little interest and after only a year of study moved to the London College of Music. He took a break from studies and travelled to Greece for a sabbatical. Their landlord, Mike Leonard, purchased a Farfisa electric organ and briefly replaced Wright in the band. However, this organ became Wright's main instrument.

== Career ==
=== 1960s–1970s: Pink Floyd ===
Through a friend, Wright arranged Pink Floyd's first recording session in a West Hampstead studio, just before Christmas 1964. The guitarist Bob Klose and the guitarist and singer Syd Barrett joined the band, which became Pink Floyd. Wright's first solo song, "You're the Reason Why", appeared in 1964 on Decca as the B-side of a single by Adam, Mike and Tim.

Pink Floyd stabilised with Barrett, Waters, Mason and Wright by mid-1965, and after frequent gigging that year became regulars on the underground circuit in London. While Barrett was the dominant member, writing and singing most of the songs, Wright had an important supporting role, playing keyboards, singing harmony and contributing arrangements. He also occasionally wrote and sang lead on songs. As the most qualified musician technically, Wright was also responsible for tuning Barrett's guitars and Waters' bass during concerts. Later on, he used a Strobotuner to tune guitars silently during gigs. Before Pink Floyd acquired a full-time road crew, Wright acted as the primary roadie, unloading the gear and packing it up at each gig.

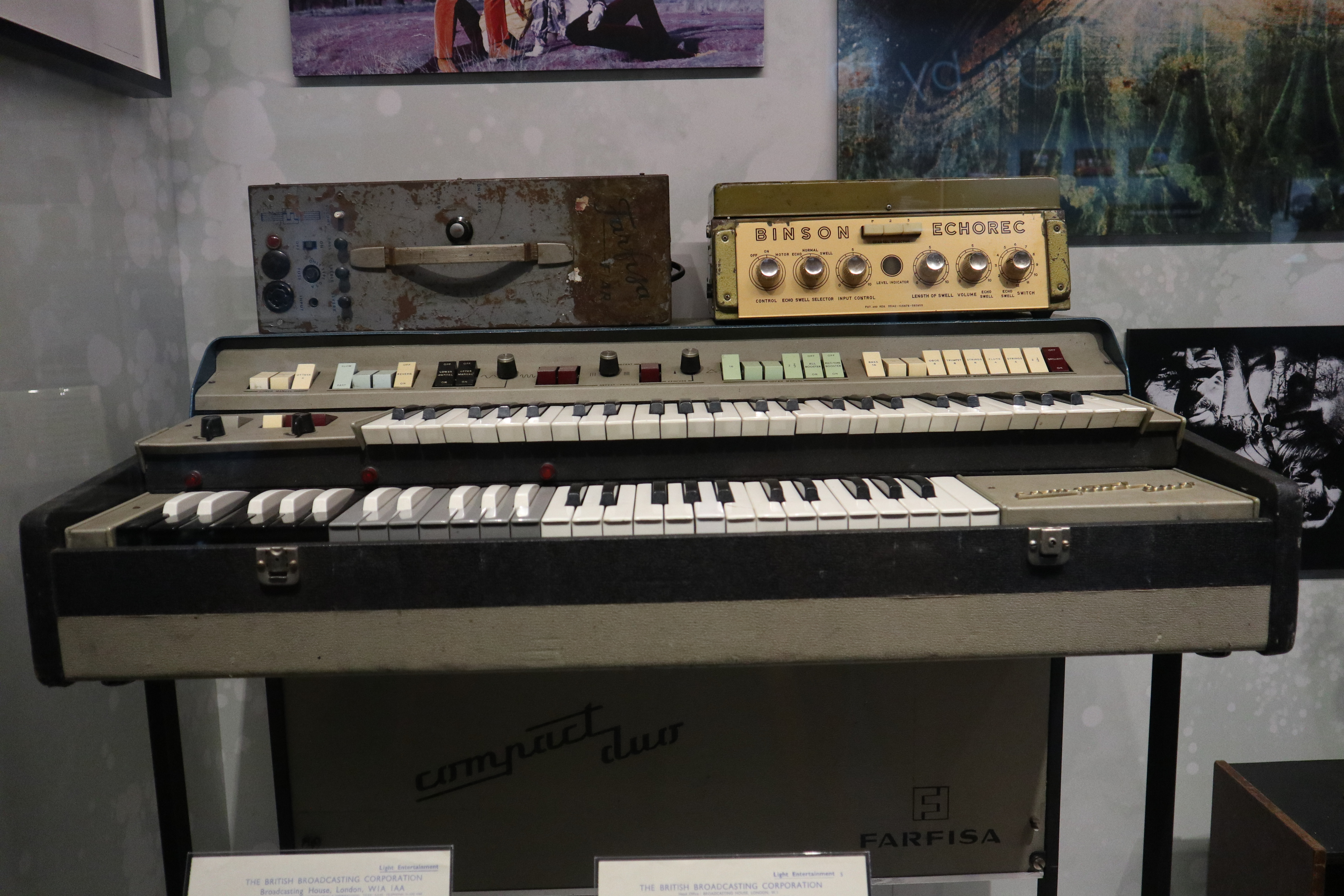
Wright's Farfisa Compact-Duo organ, used on early Pink Floyd recordings up to The Dark Side of the Moon

Pink Floyd released their debut album, The Piper at the Gates of Dawn in 1967. Though not credited, Wright sang lead on the Barrett-written songs "Astronomy Domine" and "Matilda Mother". Examples of his early compositions include "Remember a Day", "See-Saw", "Paint Box" and "It Would Be So Nice".

Wright was close friends with Barrett, and at one point the pair shared a flat in Richmond, London. After Barrett was forced out of Pink Floyd in 1968 following mental health problems, Wright considered leaving and forming a group with him, but realised it would not have been practical. Wright played on Barrett's second solo album, Barrett (1970), and helped with its production. He recalled working on the album as a way of helping Barrett in any way possible. He guested at a concert by Sutherland Brothers & Quiver in 1974 at Newcastle Polytechnic.

Following Barrett's replacement by David Gilmour, Wright took over some songwriting, but gradually became less involved. His keyboard playing remained an integral part of the band's live set, particularly on "Interstellar Overdrive", "Set the Controls for the Heart of the Sun" and "Careful with That Axe, Eugene". He contributed themes for Pink Floyd's film scores for More, Zabriskie Point and Obscured by Clouds. He made significant arranging contributions to longer compositions such as "Atom Heart Mother", "Echoes" (on which he sang lead vocals with Gilmour) and "Shine On You Crazy Diamond". On 1973's The Dark Side of the Moon, he composed the music for "The Great Gig in the Sky" and "Us and Them". He also contributed to the composition of tracks such as "Time", for which he sang lead in the bridge sections, "Breathe", and "Any Colour You Like".

=== Late 1970s–early 1980s: Conflict and departure from Pink Floyd ===
Wright recorded his first solo album, Wet Dream, in early 1978 in Super Bear Studios, France, which featured the Pink Floyd touring guitarist Snowy White and the former King Crimson saxophonist Mel Collins. Several songs on the album refer to his holiday home in Lindos. The album was released in September to minimal commercial success.

Wright's contributions to Pink Floyd recordings diminished in the late 1970s as Waters began to dominate the writing process. Animals (1977) was the first Pink Floyd album without songwriting credits for Wright. By the time the group recorded The Wall in 1979, Waters had become frustrated that Wright was not contributing but was claiming an equal share of production royalties. Wright refused to catch up on the recording backlog as his first marriage had deteriorated and he had not seen enough of his children, deciding family was more important. He said later: "Both myself and Dave… had little to offer, through laziness or whatever. Looking back, although I didn't realise it, I was depressed."

Waters considered suing Wright, but decided it would be easier for Wright to leave at the end of the project. Wright spoke with Gilmour, who said he would back him to stay in the band but felt he had contributed little to the album. Wright agreed to leave, but would finish the album and accompanying tour. Waters, Gilmour, producer Bob Ezrin, composer Michael Kamen and session player Fred Mandel also played keyboard parts on The Wall. Wright generally went into the studio late at night when the other band members were not there. He was not credited for his parts on the first pressings on the album, which was later corrected.

Wright's departure from Pink Floyd was not publicly confirmed until years later. As he was retained as a salaried session musician during the Wall tour, most fans were unaware that he was no longer a member. He recalled: "I put everything I could into the performances, and I think Roger approved of that. We would talk civilly to each other. It wasn't too bad at all." Though he remained angry about his treatment by Waters, he said he was not sad to leave Pink Floyd as "the band had lost any feeling of communication and camaraderie by this time ... It was a band that I felt was falling to pieces — which of course it did."

Wright was the only member of Pink Floyd to profit from the Wall tour, since the net loss had to be borne by the band members. He did not attend the 1982 premiere of the film of Pink Floyd—The Wall. In 1983, Pink Floyd released The Final Cut, the only Pink Floyd album on which Wright does not appear. His absence from the album credits was the first time fans realised he had left.

=== 1983–1995: Zee and return to Pink Floyd ===
During 1983–1984, Wright formed a musical duo, Zee, with Dave Harris of the band Fashion. The pair had been introduced by a mutual friend, the saxophonist Raphael Ravenscroft. They signed a record deal with EMI Records and released only one album, Identity, which was a commercial and critical failure. Wright later referred to Zee as "an experiment best forgotten".

After Waters' departure in 1985, Wright began to contribute to Pink Floyd again, beginning with A Momentary Lapse of Reason (1987). However, he remained a salaried musician as his contract forbade him from rejoining as a member. On the album credits, Wright was listed among the other session musicians and his photo did not appear on the inner sleeve with Gilmour and Mason.

By 1994, Wright had officially rejoined Pink Floyd. In 2000 he said: "I am a full member, but contractually I am not on a par with Dave and Nick." For the second Pink Floyd album without Waters, The Division Bell (1994), he co-wrote five songs and sang lead on "Wearing the Inside Out", which he co-wrote with Anthony Moore. Wright was initially unsure about contributing to the album, later saying it "didn't feel like what we'd agreed was fair". The Division Bell Tour was Pink Floyd's last. Wright, like Mason, performed on every Pink Floyd tour.

=== 1996–2005: Broken China and reunion with Waters ===
In 1996, inspired by his successful contributions to The Division Bell, Wright released his second solo album, Broken China, which had been co-written with Moore, who also helped with production and engineering. The album covers the theme of depression and helped Wright come to terms with seeing his wife and friends affected by it. Contributions came from the bassist Pino Palladino, the drummer Manu Katché and the guitarist Dominic Miller (both known for their work with Sting) and the guitarist Tim Renwick (another Pink Floyd associate). Gilmour contributed a guitar part for "Breakthrough", which was not used for the final mix. Sinéad O'Connor sang lead vocals on "Reaching for the Rail" and "Breakthrough", with Wright singing the remainder. Wright considered taking the album on tour, but concluded it would not be financially viable. In 2006, he co-wrote the Helen Boulding B-side "Hazel Eyes" with Chris Difford.

In 1999, the Pink Floyd touring keyboardist Jon Carin joined Wright's wife to reunite Wright and Waters after 18 years apart. The men met backstage after a performance by Waters. Wright played at several of Gilmour's solo shows in 2002, contributing keyboards and vocals, including his composition "Breakthrough". On 2 July 2005, Wright, Gilmour and Mason were joined by Waters on stage for the first time since the Wall concerts for a short set at the Live 8 concert in London. It was the last time that all four members performed together. Wright underwent surgery for cataracts that November, preventing him from attending Pink Floyd's induction into the UK Music Hall of Fame.

=== 2005–2008: Work with Gilmour ===
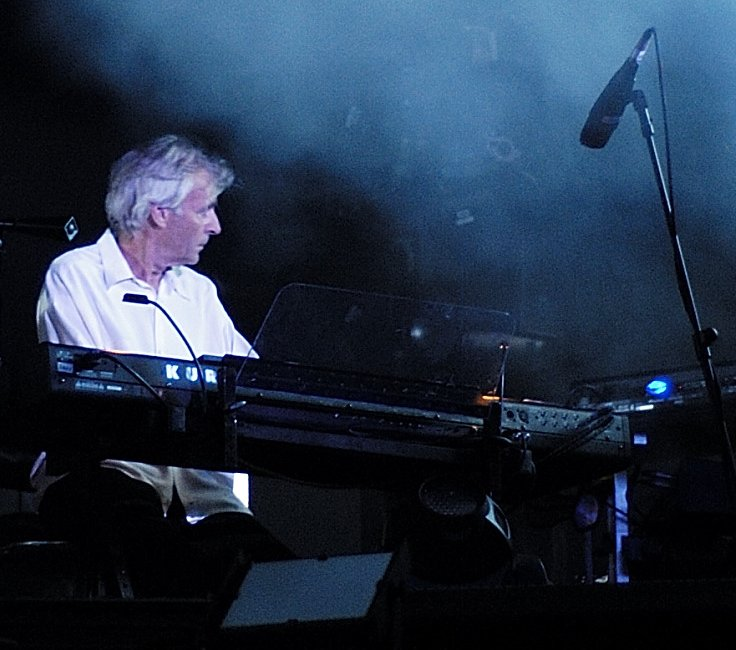
Wright performing in 2006

In 2006, Wright became a regular member of Gilmour's touring band, along with the former Pink Floyd sidemen Jon Carin, Dick Parry and Guy Pratt. He contributed keyboards and background vocals to Gilmour's 2006 solo album On an Island, and performed live in Europe and North America that year. On stage with Gilmour, he played keyboards, including a revival of the Farfisa organ for "Echoes". Wright sang lead on "Arnold Layne", which was released as a live single. He declined an offer to join Waters and Mason on Waters' Dark Side of the Moon Live tour to spend time working on a solo project. That year, Wright joined Gilmour and Mason for a screening of the Pink Floyd Pulse live concert video. Asked about performing again, Wright replied he would be happy on stage anywhere. He explained that his plan was to "meander" along and play live whenever Gilmour required his services.

Wright performed at the Barrett tribute concert "Madcap's Last Laugh" at the Barbican in London on 10 May 2007. It was organised by Joe Boyd in memory of Barrett, who had died the previous July. The first half featured a Waters solo performance, while the second half concluded with Wright, alongside Gilmour and Mason, performing "Arnold Layne". By mid-2007, Wright was living alone in Kensington, London. He enjoyed playing as part of Gilmour's solo band, calling it "the most fun tour I've ever done in my life". That year, he recorded a jam with Gilmour's band, which was released on Gilmour's 2024 album Luck and Strange.

== Death ==
Wright died from lung cancer at his home in London on 15 September 2008, aged 65. At the time of his death, he had been working on a new solo album, thought to comprise a series of instrumental pieces.

The surviving members of Pink Floyd paid tribute to Wright. Waters said it was "hard to overstate the importance of his musical voice in the Pink Floyd of the 60s and 70s", and he added that he was happy they had reunited for Live 8. Mason said Wright's contributions were underrated, and that his playing "was the sound that knitted it all together", comparing his "quiet one" status in the band to George Harrison of the Beatles. Gilmour called him "my musical partner and my friend", and praised Wright's ability to blend his voice with Gilmour's, such as on "Echoes". Gilmour reiterated that it would be wrong to continue as Pink Floyd without him. In the updated edition of his memoir, Mason wrote that "the distinctive, floating textures and colours [Wright] brought into the mix were absolutely critical to what people recognise as the sound of Pink Floyd ... He once summed up his musical philosophy by saying, 'Technique is so secondary to ideas.' Many fine keyboard players could and did emulate and recreate his parts, but nobody else other than Rick had the ability to create them in the first place."

Eight days after Wright's death, Gilmour performed "Remember a Day", a Wright composition from Pink Floyd's second studio album, A Saucerful of Secrets (1968), on a live broadcast of Later... with Jools Holland on BBC Two as a tribute to Wright. Gilmour said that Wright had intended to perform with him that day. Gilmour and Nick Mason performed the song together at Wright's memorial service, which was held at Notting Hill Theatre. Jeff Beck performed an unaccompanied guitar solo.

Gilmour dedicated his song "A Boat Lies Waiting" from his fourth solo studio album Rattle That Lock (2015) to Wright's memory. It features a sample of Wright's voice. The lyrics define Gilmour's sadness on his demise and revolves around mortality and Wright's love for the sea. In 2014, Pink Floyd released their fifteenth and final studio album, The Endless River, comprising mostly instrumental music recorded during the Division Bell sessions along with new music recorded between 2010 and 2014. It contains previously unreleased parts recorded by Wright. Mason described the album as a tribute to Wright.

== Musical style ==
Wright's main influence was jazz, particularly Miles Davis and John Coltrane. He did not consider himself a typical songwriter, preferring to create whole albums of music with a theme. He said: "If the words came out like the music, and we didn't have anything else to do, then quite a few would be written." A number of compositions credited to Wright came out of improvisation and randomly trying ideas, some of which were picked up enthusiastically by his bandmates. Wright later said, "I just play and don't really think about what I'm doing[;] I just let it happen". Of all the Pink Floyd members, Wright was the most reserved, sitting down behind the keyboards and concentrating on the music.

In the 1970s, Wright listened to some contemporary progressive rock bands, and particularly liked early Peter Gabriel-fronted Genesis. He later asked some of the musicians in Gabriel's solo touring band to play on Broken China. Wright enjoyed playing the organ, and considered the style he used in Pink Floyd to be unique. He played solos in the early part of Floyd's career, frequently using Egyptian scales, such as on "Matilda Mother" or "Set the Controls for the Heart of the Sun". His jazz background led to him being interested in free form music, with adherence to tempo being less important. Later, he was more interested in complementing each piece with organ, electric piano or synthesiser as a backing instrument, while still featuring occasional solos.

=== Equipment ===
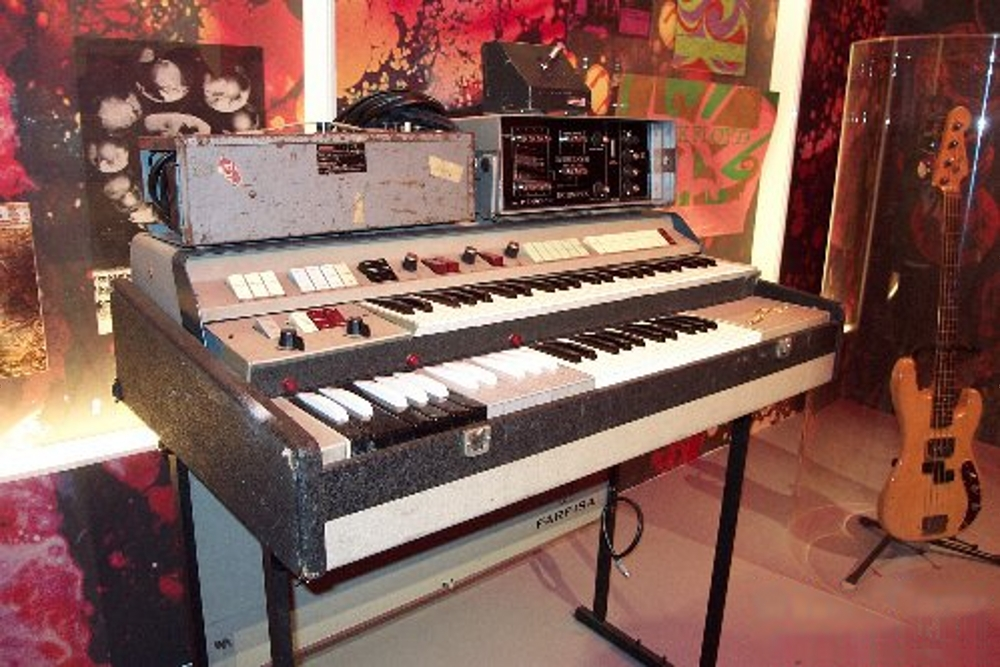
Richard Wright's Farfisa Compact Duo organ and Binson Echorec unit

In the early days of Pink Floyd, Wright dabbled with brass before settling on Farfisa electric organs as his main instrument onstage. He originally owned a single-manual Combo Compact model, which was used for early recordings of "Interstellar Overdrive", and he later upgraded to a dual-manual Compact Duo. During the 1960s, Wright relied heavily on his Farfisa fed through a Binson Echorec platter echo, as heard on the Ummagumma live album. On later tours, the Farfisa was fed through a joystick control allowing the signal to be sent through up to six speakers in an auditorium, which was called the "Azimuth Coordinator". Wright stopped using the Farfisa after The Dark Side of the Moon, but revisited it in later years, playing it on Gilmour's On An Island tour. It was recorded for the sessions that eventually became The Endless River.

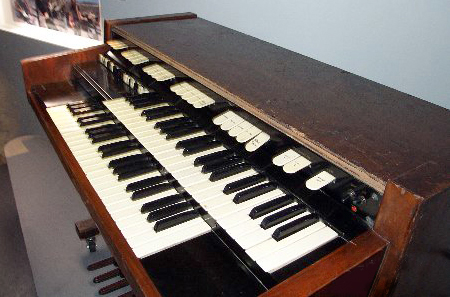
Wright's Hammond M-102 organ, used on Pink Floyd: Live at Pompeii.

Wright played the piano and Hammond organ in the studio from the start of Pink Floyd's recording career; using the Hammond's bass pedals for the closing section of "A Saucerful of Secrets". He used a Mellotron in the studio for some tracks, including Ummagumma's "Sysyphus" and on the "Atom Heart Mother" suite. For a brief period in 1969, Wright played vibraphone on several of the band's songs and in some live shows, and reintroduced the trombone on "Biding My Time". He started using a Hammond organ regularly on stage alongside the Farfisa around 1970 and a grand piano became part of his usual live concert setup when "Echoes" was added to Pink Floyd's regular set list. All three keyboards are used in the concert film Pink Floyd: Live at Pompeii. (Note: eg: grand piano on "Echoes Part I", Hammond organ on "A Saucerful of Secrets" (closing section), Farfisa on "Echoes Part II")

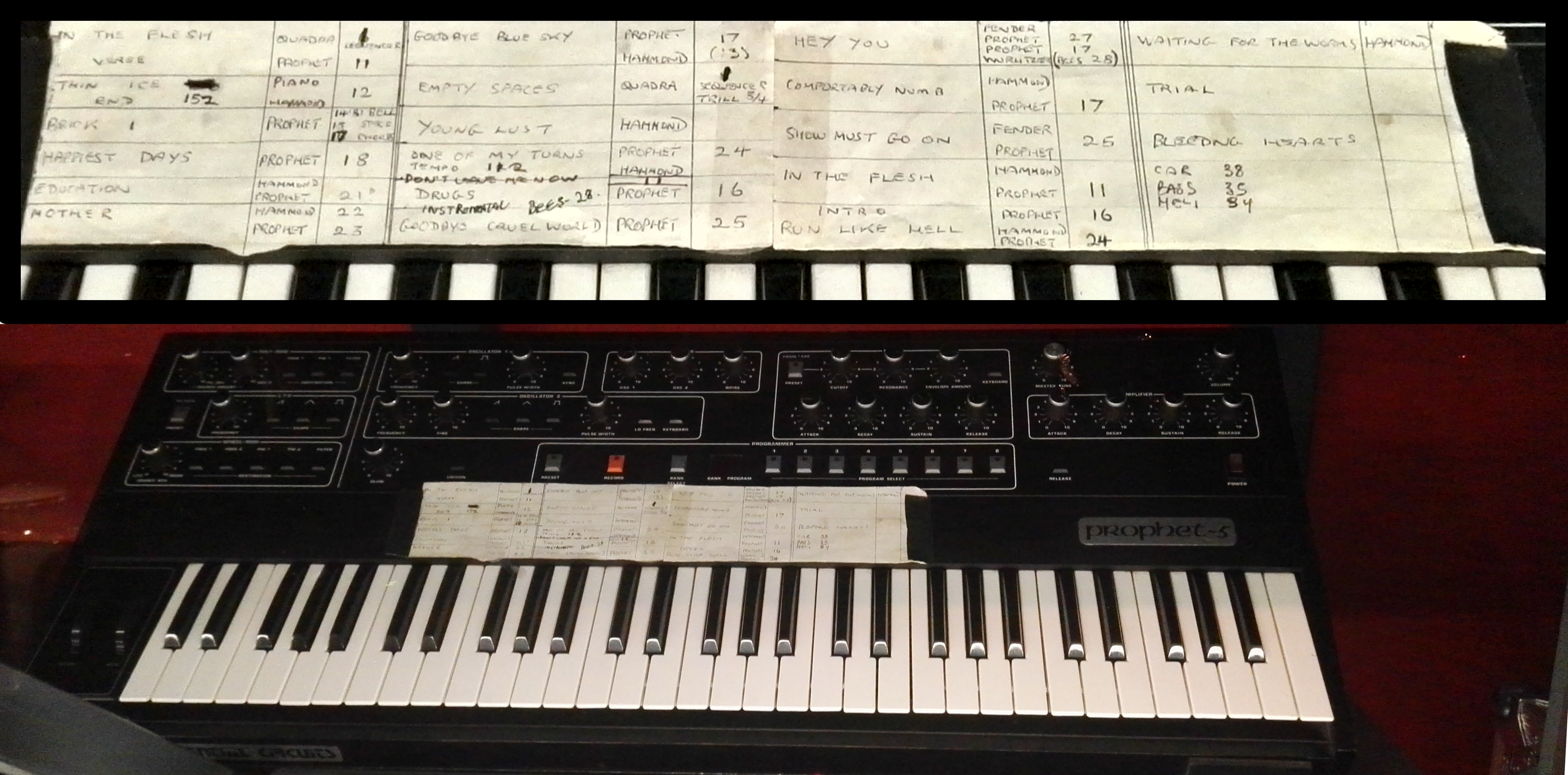
Wright's Prophet-5 synthesiser, used in the Wall tour

In the 1970s, Wright began using synthesisers such as the VCS 3, ARP String Ensemble and Minimoog, which were featured on "Shine On You Crazy Diamond". Wright wrote the closing part of the track alone, and included a brief extract of the band's early single "See Emily Play" on the Minimoog towards the end. He used a number of electric pianos during the 1970s, including a Wurlitzer fed through a wah-wah pedal on "Money" and an unaccompanied Rhodes introduction for "Sheep" on Animals.

From the 1987 Momentary Lapse of Reason tour onwards, Wright and touring keyboardist Jon Carin favoured Kurzweil digital synthesisers, including the K2000 keyboard and K2000S rack module for reproducing piano and electric piano sounds. Wright retained the Hammond along with a Leslie speaker, playing it onstage and using it during the Division Bell sessions.

In addition to keyboards, Wright played guitar, flute, cello, trombone, violin, drums, saxophone and bass. Other keyboards that he used in the studio were tack piano, harpsichord, celesta and harmonium, such as on Barrett's solo song "Love Song" and "Chapter 24".

== Personal life ==
Wright married his first wife, Juliette Gale, in 1964. She had been a singer in one of the early bands that evolved into Pink Floyd. They had two children and divorced in 1982. Wright's second marriage, to Franka, lasted from 1984 to 1994. Wright married his third wife, Mildred "Millie" Hobbs, in 1995, with whom he had a son, Ben. Wright's second solo studio album Broken China (1996) is about her battle with depression. They separated in 2007. Wright's daughter Gala was married to the bassist Guy Pratt, who toured and recorded with Pink Floyd after the departure of Waters.

Wright had been fond of the Greek islands since a sabbatical visit in 1964, before Pink Floyd formed. He moved to Greece in 1984 after the Zee project, briefly retiring from music, and enjoyed sailing and yachting. In the 1970s, he acquired a property in Lindos, Rhodes. In his later years, Wright lived in Le Rouret, France, and spent time on a yacht he owned in the Virgin Islands. He found sailing therapeutic, relieving him from the pressures of the music business. He was also a collector of Persian rugs.

== Discography ==
=== Solo albums ===
- Wet Dream (1978)
- Broken China (1996)

=== Band albums ===
==== With Pink Floyd ====
- The Piper at the Gates of Dawn (1967)
- A Saucerful of Secrets (1968)
- More (1969)
- Ummagumma (1969)
- Atom Heart Mother (1970)
- Meddle (1971)
- Obscured by Clouds (1972)
- The Dark Side of the Moon (1973)
- Wish You Were Here (1975)
- Animals (1977)
- The Wall (1979)
- A Momentary Lapse of Reason (1987)
- The Division Bell (1994)
- The Endless River (2014)

=== With Zee ===
- Identity – 1984

=== Session appearances ===
==== With Syd Barrett ====
- Barrett – 1970

==== With David Gilmour ====
- David Gilmour in Concert (DVD) – 2002
- On an Island – 2006
  - "On an Island" (Hammond organ) and "The Blue" (backing vocals)
- Remember That Night (DVD/Blu-ray) – 2007
- Live in Gdańsk (CD/DVD) – 2008
- Luck and Strange – 2024
