= Marc Hollander =

Belgian musician and producer

- Born: Marc Hollander
- Genres: Avant-rock, experimental
- Occupations: Musician, producer
- Instruments: Keyboards, clarinet, saxophone, percussion
- Years active: 1976–present

Marc Hollander is a Belgian musician, producer and creator of the independent record label, Crammed Discs.

Hollander is the leader of the Belgian avant-rock group Aksak Maboul, which he founded in 1977 with Vincent Kenis. Aksak Maboul first released two albums, Onze Danses Pour Combattre la Migraine (1977) and Un Peu de l'Âme des Bandits (1980), went on a long hiatus, and was revived in 2015. Hollander joined Art Bears for their European tour in 1979, and was a member of The Honeymoon Killers and Cos. Hollander has also collaborated with a number of musicians, including Fred Frith and Chris Cutler.

In 1980 Hollander founded Crammed Discs, which he still actively runs, while acting as the label's artistic director. With Crammed, he has discovered, launched and/or developed the careers of artists such as Bebel Gilberto, Zap Mama, Konono Nº1, Kasai Allstars, Cibelle, Taraf de Haïdouks, Tuxedomoon, Bel Canto, Minimal Compact, Hector Zazou, Sussan Deyhim, Snooze/Dominique Dalcan, DJ Morpheus, Suba, Zuco 103, Celso Fonseca, Kočani Orkestar, Mahala Rai Banda, Balkan Beat Box, Shantel, Lonely Drifter Karen, Staff Benda Bilili, Maïa Vidal, SKIP&DIE, Yasmine Hamdan, Juana Molina, Acid Arab and others.

In 2014, Crammed Discs released Ex-Futur Album, under the name Véronique Vincent & Aksak Maboul. It is the unfinished album which was meant to become the third Aksak Maboul album, and had been written and recorded by Hollander and Honeymoon Killers vocalist Vincent between 1980 and 1983. It was shelved for over 30 years, and assembled and revamped by Hollander in 2014. Following the positive reception of Ex-Futur Album, Marc Hollander and Véronique Vincent formed a new live line-up of Aksak Maboul in 2015, and performed dozens of concerts around Europe.

Now revolving around Hollander and Véronique Vincent, Aksak Maboul wrote, recorded and released two brand-new albums: Figures (2020) and Une aventure de VV (Songspiel) (2023).

== Discography ==
- Cos: Viva Boma (1976, LP, Best Seller, Belgium/Netherlands)
- Aksak Maboul: Onze Danses Pour Combattre la Migraine (1977, LP, Kamikaze Records, re-issued on Crammed Discs, Belgium)
- Aksak Maboul: Un Peu de l'Âme des Bandits (1980, LP, Crammed Discs, Belgium)
- The Honeymoon Killers: Les Tueurs De La Lune De Miel (1982, LP, Crammed Discs, Belgium)
- Aksak Maboul: Un Chien mérite un mort de chien (1983, in Made To Measure Vol.1, Crammed Discs, Belgium)
- Véronique Vincent & Aksak Maboul: Ex-Futur Album (2014, Crammed Discs, Belgium)
- Véronique Vincent & Aksak Maboul: 16 Visions of Ex-Futur (2016, Crammed Discs, Belgium)
- Aksak Maboul: Figures (2020, double album, Crammed Discs, Belgium)
- Aksak Maboul: Une aventure de VV (Songspiel) (2023, album, Crammed Discs, Belgium)
- Contributions to various albums as a musician and/or producer: see http://www.crammed.be/index.php?id=34&art_id=85

== Literature ==
- Brigitte Tast, Hans-Jürgen Tast: be bop - Die Wilhelmshöhe rockt. Disco und Konzerte in der Hölle Verlag Gebrüder Gerstenberg GmbH & Co. KG, Hildesheim, ISBN 978-3-8067-8589-0.

== See also ==
- Romantic Warriors II: A Progressive Music Saga About Rock in Opposition
- Romantic Warriors II: Special Features DVD
