= Un Peu de l'Âme des Bandits =

- Original LP release with the band's name spelt "Aqsak Maboul"

Studio album by Aksak Maboul
- Released: January 1980
- Recorded: February and August 1979
- Studio: Sunrise Studios, Kirchberg, Switzerland
- Genre: Avant-rock
- Length: 43:21
- Label: Crammed (Belgium)
- Producer: Aksak Maboul

Aksak Maboul chronology
Onze Danses Pour Combattre la Migraine (1977)	Un Peu de l'Âme des Bandits (1980)	Ex-Futur Album (2014)

Un Peu de l'Âme des Bandits (English: A Little of the Bandit Spirit) is the second album by Belgian avant-rock band Aksak Maboul. It was recorded at Sunrise Studio in Kirchberg, Switzerland, in February and August 1979, and released on LP in January 1980 on founding member Marc Hollander's Belgian independent record label, Crammed Discs. At the time, the band had changed the spelling of their name to "Aqsak Maboul", and this is reflected on the album's record sleeve. When the album was re-issued on CD in 1995 (also on Crammed Discs) the spelling of their name reverted to "Aksak Maboul".

In addition to the Aksak Maboul line-up at the time, the album also featured ex-Henry Cow musicians Fred Frith and Chris Cutler, whose contribution and names helped bring the album to the attention of a wider audience. Aksak Maboul's co-founder, Vincent Kenis, did not play on this album, although he did arrange two of the tracks.

== Background ==
The formation of Rock in Opposition (RIO) in 1978 brought together a number of like-minded European bands. Aksak Maboul was amongst the second wave of bands to join RIO and benefited from the collaborations it spawned. This album features three musicians from two other RIO bands: Michel Berckmans from Univers Zero, who had joined Aksak Maboul when they began performing live in 1978, and Fred Frith and Chris Cutler from Henry Cow, who were invited by Marc Hollander to participate in the recording.

== Content ==
Un Peu de l'Ame des Bandits is more intense and experimental than Aksak Maboul's first album, Onze Danses Pour Combattre la Migraine (1977). It comprises complex written sections as well as improvised ambient pieces. It uses sampling before samplers were invented and is a mixture of tangos, Turkish tunes, "chamber rock", noisy punk rock, and pseudo-Varèse music. Like the first album, it is largely instrumental with a little singing and other vocals.

Side A of the LP record contains five dance pieces. "Modern Lesson" begins as a "twisted blues number" with gibberish vocals over guitar, cello, and saxophone, then switches to horn and string chamber music. It includes sounds from a pinball machine flipper as well as samples from every other track on the album. "Tango" was composed with "hat, scissors and glue" and features several popular tangos cut up and reassembled at random; the resulting "opus" was learned and performed live in one take. "I Viaggi Formano la Gioventú" is an arrangement of a Turkish folk song featuring dumbeg and cello playing traditional scales. "Inoculating Rabies" is "angry bassoon punk" that is a composed bassoon and bass clarinet piece over a background of noisy rock guitar music.

Side B is the 23-minute "Cinema" suite, which includes four solos: six-string bass-guitar, acoustic cello, electric cello, and synthesizer. It contains "dissonant woodwind passages, atonal psychedelic rock-outs, and snatches of Middle Eastern music". The last section, "Age Route Brra! (Radio Sofia)", is an improvised imitation of a Bulgarian radio talk show. "Cinema" was well received in progressive rock circles, as was the album as a whole.

== Reception ==
Professional ratings
Review scores
Source	Rating
AllMusic	4.5/5 stars
The Quietus	very favourable
Pitchfork	7.2/10

AllMusic called it "a pinnacle of the RIO movement", while Gnosis said, "Overall a very good album and one that is considered de rigueur for RIO fans." In their review of the album's 2018 reissue, Pitchfork criticized the album's "[dis]regard for flow" whilst saying that it does not come at "the expense of exhilarating technicality". The Quietus called it "still great ... riotous and breathtaking" in their review of the same.

== Track listing ==
On the original LP release, the track titles on the record sleeve and the vinyl label differ. The titles below are from the album sleeve with those on the vinyl label enclosed in square brackets. All arrangements are by Aksak Maboul, except where noted.

Side A

1. "A Modern Lesson [Bo Diddley]" (Marc Hollander, arr. Fred Frith, Hollander, Catherine Jauniaux) – 4:58
2. "Palmiers en Pots"
  1. "[Trio (from Nuits D'Argentine)]" (André Verchuren) – 1:25
  2. "[Tango]" (Frank Wuyts, Hollander) – 1:59
3. "Geistige Nacht [Rondo]" (Frith, arr. Frith) – 5:18
4. "I Viaggi Formano la Gioventú [Truc Turc]" (trad. Turkish folk song arr. Vincent Kenis, Aksak Maboul) – 5:09
5. "Inoculating Rabies [Pogo]" (Denis van Hecke, Wuyts) – 1:47

Side B

1. "Cinema [Knokke]"
  1. "Ce Qu'On Peut Voir Avec Un Bon Microscope" (Hollander, Wuyts, Aksak Maboul) – 7:25
  2. "Alluvions" (Hollander, Wuyts, arr. Kenis, Aksak Maboul) – 5:27
  3. "Azinou Crapules" (Hollander, Wuyts) – 7:05
  4. "Age Route Brra! (Radio Sofia)" (Aksak Maboul) – 2:48

== Personnel ==
- Marc Hollander – organ (A1, A4, B1), piano (A1, B1), clarinet (A1), bass clarinet (A1, A5, B1), saxophone (A1), drum machine (A1), alto saxophone (A2, B1), soprano saxophone (A3, A4), dumbeg (A4), samples (A4), xylophone (B1), percussion (B1.2)
- Frank Wuyts – drums (A1), pinball machine flipper (A1), recorder (A1), piano (A2–4, B1), synthesizer (A3, A4, B1), percussion (B1), choir (A1)
- Michel Berckmans – bassoon (A1–3, A5, B1), oboe (A1, A3, A4, B1), choir (A1)
- Denis van Hecke – acoustic cello (A1–4, B1), electric cello (A4, A5, B1), voice (A4, A5, B1), rhythm guitar (A5)
- Catherine Jauniaux – voice (A1, B1), pinball machine flipper (A1)
- Fred Frith – guitar (A1, A4, A5, B1), violin (A1, A2), viola (A1), bass guitar (A1, A3, A5, B1), prepared guitar (B1)
- Chris Cutler – drums (A1–3, A5, B1), percussion (B1), radio (B1)

=== Production ===
- Recorded February and August 1979 at Sunrise Studio, Kirchberg, Switzerland
- Mixed by Etienne Conod and Fred Frith, assisted by Aksak Maboul
- Front cover by Pat Andrea
- Back cover and layout by M.M.C. Octave

== Re-issues ==
In 1995 Un Peu de l'Âme des Bandits was re-issued on CD on the Crammed Discs label. It contained an extra track recorded by The Honeymoon Killers (formed by a merger in 1980 of Aksak Maboul and Les Tueurs de la Lune de Miel):

- "Bosses de Crosses [Horreurs]" (Hollander, Yvon Vromman, arr. Honeymoon Killers) – 7:02

The following musicians appeared on this track:

- Marc Hollander – bass clarinet, keyboards, melodica, tapes
- Vincent Kenis – bass guitar
- Yvon Vromman – guitar, vocals
- Véronique Vincent – vocals
- Gérald Fenerberg – guitar
- J.F Jones Jacob – drums

A variation of this piece entitled "Boss de Crosses dans le Doulos" was released in 1982 on the Recommended Records Sampler. The CD cover used the original LP artwork in colour, with the band's name spelt "Aksak Maboul", and not "Aqsak Maboul".

In 2018, Un Peu de l'Âme des Bandits was re-issued on vinyl by Crammed Discs. The album was remastered from the original tapes, and includes a large booklet with abundant liner notes, rare documents, and recollections by all the participants. Also included is a bonus album entitled Before and After Bandits, consisting of ten previously unreleased live and demo recordings, and featuring seventeen of the band's subsequent members and guests. This series of tracks depicts the evolution of the constantly morphing Aksak Maboul, from the band's 1977 debut album to the Bandits album, followed by a lesser-known avant-no wave phase in 1980, the eclectic electropop of Ex-Futur Album, and through to the band's current incarnation, with a live track from 2015.

The following musicians appear in Before and After Bandits, in chronological order:

- Marc Hollander: keyboards, woodwind
- Vincent Kenis: guitar, bass
- Chris Joris: percussion
- Frank Wuyts: keyboards
- Michel Berckmans: bassoon, oboe
- Denis Van Hecke: cello
- Geoff Leigh: flute, sax
- Guigou Chenevier: drums
- Chris Cutler: drums
- Fred Frith: bass, guitar
- Gérald Fenerberg: guitar
- Yvon Vromman: guitar, vocals
- Jean-François Jones Jacob III: drums
- Véronique Vincent: vocals
- Faustine Hollander: bass
- Sebastiaan Van den Branden: synth
- Christophe Claeys: drums
