= Recommended Records Sampler =

Record label sampler album by various artists

Compilation album by various artists
- Released: May 1982
- Genre: Avant-rock
- Length: 117:47
- Label: Recommended (UK)

The Recommended Records Sampler is a sampler double album by various artists released by English independent record label Recommended Records on LP in 1982. It contains tracks by musicians and groups on the Recommended Records catalogue at the time.

This sampler differed from the traditional record label sampler in that all the pieces here were newly recorded by the artists and, at the time, had never been released elsewhere. (Many of the tracks were later re-released as bonus tracks on the artists' CD reissues of their own albums.) In 1985 Recommended Records launched the RēR Quarterly, a "quarterly" sound-magazine, which continued this approach of releasing previously unreleased work on a compilation album.

A limited-edition single-sided EP of the same name was also released in 1982 by Recommended Records and given free to advance subscribers of the double album. It comprised four previously unreleased tracks.

== Reception ==
Professional ratings
Review scores
Source	Rating
AllMusic	4/5 stars

Writing in a review at AllMusic, William Tilland noted that because of Recommended Records' non-commercial stance and the diverse styles of music on this sampler, listening to it "can be challenging" to the uninitiated. He said its highlights include the pieces by Belgian neo-classical gothic groups Art Zoyd and Univers Zero, and called the Aksak Maboul / Honeymoon Killers track, "a fine example of European chamber rock". He was also pleased at the inclusion of two little-known British bands the Work and This Heat. Tilland named Heiner Goebbels' "Berlin – Kudamm 12 April 1981", which concerns a street riot, "the single most unusual" track in the collection. Tilland did, however, question including single tracks by lo-fi artists R. Stevie Moore and Hector Zazou as he felt it did not give them the exposure they deserved. Overall, Tillard described the sampler as "a valuable historical document" and "a fine introduction to a number of artists". He rated the collection as "highly recommended".

== Double-LP track listing ==
Side A
No.	Title	Artist	Length
1.	"Flaschenzug" (Vogel)	Vogel	3:50
2.	"Extract 5 from Faust Party Three: 'The Voice Of The Pumpkin' " (Faust)	Faust	4:29
3.	"All Hail" (Chris Cutler, Fred Frith)	Art Bears	4:09
4.	"Reparto Novità" (Carlo De Martini, Umberto Fiori)	Stormy Six	4:34
5.	"Walk Before Imitate" (The Homosexuals)	The Homosexuals	2:44
6.	"On Ne Plus Compter Sur Ses Doigts" (Joseph Racaille, Patrick Portella)	Joseph Racaille & Patrick Portella	0:54
7.	" * " (Feliu Gasul)	Feliu Gasul	7:26

Side B
No.	Title	Artist	Length
1.	"Strangelove" (The Black Sheep)	The Black Sheep	2:56
2.	"Influences" (Andy Kirk)	Univers Zero	7:38
3.	"Boss De Crosses Dans Le Doulos" (Marc Hollander, Yvon Vromman)	Aksak Maboul / The Honeymoon Killers	7:04
4.	"Houdini" (The Work)	The Work	4:01
5.	"Slice" (Lindsay Cooper)	Henry Cow	0:39
6.	"Viva Pa Ubu" (Tim Hodgkinson)	Henry Cow	4:26
7.	"Radio Extract" (Decibel)	Decibel	3:01

Side C
No.	Title	Artist	Length
1.	"Simulacres" (Gérard Hourbette)	Art Zoyd	6:58
2.	"Two Extracts from 'Chronometers' " (Dave Newhouse, The Muffins)	The Muffins	4:17
3.	"Berlin – Kudamm 12 April 1981" (Heiner Goebbels)	Heiner Goebbels	5:09
4.	"Steer Clear of England" (Balloona, Otto Dix)	Amos	3:47
5.	"Commerce Nostalgique" (André Duchesne)	Conventum	7:59
6.	"Vera C" (Hector Zazou)	Hector Zazou	2:32

Side D
No.	Title	Artist	Length
1.	"Pool" (This Heat)	This Heat	4:40
2.	"Walter Westinghouse" (The Residents)	The Residents	8:04
3.	"Pedestrian Hop & Copy Me" (R. Stevie Moore)	R. Stevie Moore	5:53
4.	"I Talk to My Haircut" (Ron Pate)	Ron Pate	3:39
5.	"Uccelin Del Bosco" (Pivio and Aldo De Scalzi)	Picchio Dal Pozzo	3:17
6.	"The Internationale" (Eugène Edine Pottier, Pierre De Geyter)	Robert Wyatt	2:59

Source: AllMusic, Discogs.

== EP track listing ==
No.	Title	Artist	Length
1.	"Frenzy" (Peter Blegvad)	Peter Blegvad	2:50
2.	"Total Drop" (The Homosexuals)	The Homosexuals	2:16
3.	"Extract VI from Faust Party Three: 'The Voice of the Pumpkin' " (Faust)	Faust	0:29
4.	"What Are You Looking At!" (R. Stevie Moore)	R. Stevie Moore	2:43
5.	"Flowers Sleep Into The Night" (Moore)	R. Stevie Moore	2:45

Source: Discogs.

== Reissues ==
In September 2008 Recommended Records released The Recommended Sampler 1982 – 25th Anniversary Edition, a fully remastered (by Bob Drake) reissue of the original double-LP on a double-CD. It coincided with the label's 30th anniversary and included a copy of the very first handwritten Recommended catalogue plus other memorabilia and trivia. The Japanese edition was issued in a replica mini-LP sleeve and included the EP.
