= Aksak Maboul =

Belgian experimental rock band

- Also known as: Aqsak Maboul
- Origin: Belgium
- Genres: Avant-rock, experimental
- Years active: 1977–1981, 2010–present
- Labels: Kamikaze, Crammed
- Formerly of: Art Bears
- Spinoffs: The Honeymoon Killers
- Spinoff of: Henry Cow

Aksak Maboul are a Belgian avant-rock band founded in 1977 by Marc Hollander with Vincent Kenis, and later revolving around Hollander and Véronique Vincent. Aksak Maboul hasn't stopped changing shape and form throughout its existence (the only permanent member being its initiator), exploring diverse musical styles with their own aesthetic approach.

Aksak Maboul started out with two studio albums, Onze Danses Pour Combattre la Migraine (1977) and Un Peu de l'Âme des Bandits (1980), the latter with ex-Henry Cow members Chris Cutler and Fred Frith. They were also active in the Rock in Opposition movement in 1979.

Around the mid-1980s, Aksak Maboul went into a 30-year hiatus, during which Marc Hollander fully devoted himself to his Crammed Discs label, before resuming his activities as a musician in 2014 by working on the unfinished third Aksak Maboul album, Ex-Futur Album (by Véronique Vincent & Aksak Maboul), that had been written and recorded between 1980 and 1983. The album came out in October 2014. Since the mid 2010s, Aksak Maboul revolved around Marc Hollander and Véronique Vincent, seconded by Faustine Hollander. The band started touring again in 2015, with a new line-up. In May 2020, they released a brand-new double album entitled Figures. March 2023 saw the release of Aksak Maboul's 5th album, an experimental audio play entitled Une Aventure de VV (Songspiel).

== History ==
The story of Aksak Maboul began in 1977 when producer Marc Moulin commissioned Marc Hollander to write and record an album for his ephemeral label Kamikaze. Hollander soon invited his friend Vincent Kenis to join in, and the pair recorded the album Onze Danses Pour Combattre la Migraine (French for "Eleven Dances for Fighting Migraine"). Hollander (keyboards, reeds, percussion) and Kenis (guitar, bass guitar, keyboards) were joined by guests such as Chris Joris (percussion, keyboards), Catherine Jauniaux (voice) and others. The album was released in 1977 under the name Marc Hollander / Aksak Maboul on Kamikaze Records, and later reissued on Crammed Discs.

Onze Danses Pour Combattre la Migraine was a playful mix of musical forms, cultures and genres. With drum machines and looping organ lines, it shuffled between improvised jazz, ethnic music, electronics and classical music. It was largely an instrumental album with snatches of singing and voices. The album contains many ideas and directions later explored by the Crammed Discs label, which Marc Hollander founded in 1980, and still runs to this day.

In late 1977 Aksak Maboul started performing live, with Hollander, Kenis, Chris Joris, as well as Marc Moulin (keyboards), who was soon replaced by Frank Wuyts, Denis van Hecke (cello) and Michel Berckmans (bassoon, oboe) of Univers Zéro joined in early 1978. In early 1979, Hollander invited Chris Cutler and Fred Frith of the recently defunct avant-rock group Henry Cow to join Aksak Maboul on their next record. They rehearsed together, performed in a few concerts and then went to Sunrise Studio, Kirchberg in Switzerland to record their second album, Un Peu de l'Âme des Bandits (French for "A Little of the Bandits' Spirit"). This was released in 1980 on Crammed Discs, a new independent record label Hollander had created to release the album.

Un Peu de l'Ame des Bandits (released as "Aqsak Maboul" (Note: On their first album, the band's name was spelled Aksak Maboul, "Aksak" being a Turkish word for "walking with a limp" (and used to describe the band's uneven, asymmetrical rhythms), and "Maboul" being a French word from the Arabic meaning "insane". When their second album was first released, the band's name changed to Aqsak Maboul (in order to reflect the change of line-up), but reverted to the original spelling again when the album was re-issued on CD in 1995.)) was more intense and experimental than their first album. It contained complex written sections as well as improvised ambient pieces. It used sampling before samplers were invented and was a mixture of tangos, Turkish tunes, chamber rock, noisy punk rock and pseudo-Varèse music. Like the first album, it was instrumental with a little singing and voices.

Back on the road again, Aksak Maboul joined the Rock in Opposition (RIO) movement and in April 1979 they performed at a RIO festival at the Teatro dell'Elfo in Milan, Italy. Aksak Maboul were one of the last of the original RIO bands.

In early 1980, Hollander founded the Crammed Discs independent record label. A few months later the original nucleus of Aksak Maboul (Hollander and Kenis) and the core of a Brussels band Les Tueurs de la Lune de Miel joined forces to become The Honeymoon Killers. They toured Europe between 1980 and 1981, although still under the name Aksak Maboul. "Bosses de Crosses", one of the first pieces they composed, was included on the CD re-issue of Un Peu de l'Ame des Bandits. In 1981, they recorded an album entitled Tueurs de la Lune de Miel / Honeymoon Killers, which attracted a lot of attention across Europe and Japan. The band toured for four years under that name.

During that period, Hollander and Honeymoon Killers vocalist Véronique Vincent, aided by Kenis, wrote and recorded a series of electronic avant-pop tracks which were meant to become Aksak Maboul's third album. The release was announced in the first Crammed Discs catalogues (in the early 1980s), but it was not completed and was put on hold, until 2014. However in 1983 a single from these sessions "I'm Always Crying" was released from these sessions under Vincent's name with production credited to Aksak Maboul.

The last Aksak Maboul recording to appear in the 1980s came out on a 1984 compilation album, Made to Measure Vol. 1, where the original duo of Hollander and Kenis contributed seven tracks of new material composed for a play by Michel Gheude based on the life of Maïakovsky. The band performed once at Kitchen in New York with line-up of Hollander, Kenis, Vincent and Gerald Fenerberg in 1986. By the mid-1980s Aksak Maboul ceased to exist as a permanent group, while Hollander and Kenis played an active role in Crammed Discs' musical policies (producing and/or performing on dozens of albums). Still in 1987 album La Débutante by singer Sonoko was partly produced by Aksak Maboul. In the late 1980s, Hollander and Kenis produced several electronic dance music tracks under the name Mr Big Mouse.

In 2010, Aksak Maboul produced a new track for Tradi-Mods vs Rockers, the tribute album to the Congotronics series which came out on Hollander's Crammed Discs label. Aksak Maboul's contribution is "Land Dispute", a new take on a song by Congolese band Kasai Allstars. The song is performed by Marc Hollander, Clément Marion & Faustine Hollander.

In 2014, Hollander resumed work on the unfinished 3rd Aksak Maboul album from 1981 to 1983, mixing and editing tracks from demos and rough versions (some of them retrieved from cassette tapes). Entitled Ex-Futur Album, the album was released under the name Véronique Vincent & Aksak Maboul, preceded by a first single ("Chez les Aborigènes") (the song had been released as a rough demo on Crammed Discs' compilation Crammed Global Soundclash 1980–89: The Connoisseur Edition in 2003). The album was followed by a video, Afflux de Luxe.

In early 2015, encouraged by the enthusiastic reactions to Ex-Futur Album, Aksak Maboul started playing shows for the first time since the mid-80s, with a new line-up including Véronique Vincent (vocals), Marc Hollander (keyboards), Faustine Hollander (guitar, bass, vocals), Sebastiaan Van den Branden (guitar, bass, synth) and Christophe Claeys (drums, percussion), the latter two being also members of Amatorski.

A full album of reinterpretations (covers and reworks) of the songs from Ex-Futur Album, entitled 16 Visions of Ex-Futur, came out in October 2016. It features contributions by Jaakko Eino Kalevi, Aquaserge, Laetitia Sadier, Forever Pavot, Flavien Berger, Nite Jewel, Bullion, Burnt Friedman, Hello Skinny, Marc Collin, Bérangère Maximin, Lena Willikens etc., as well as two "self-covers" recorded by the 2016 line-up of Aksak Maboul. On this occasion, the band created a live show entitled Aksak Maboul Revue, for which they were joined onstage by Laetitia Sadier, Jaakko Eino Kalevi, and members of Aquaserge.

At the end of 2018, Aksak Maboul announced that they were starting to work on a brand-new album. Entitled Figures, it's a double album, which was released in May 2020. Figures was written by M.Hollander and Véronique Vincent, and produced by Hollander. It features the band's most recent line-up of Marc Hollander, Véronique Vincent, Faustine Hollander, Lucien Fraipont and Erik Heestermans, with contributions by guests such as Fred Frith, Tuxedomoon's Steven Brown, and several members of Aquaserge.

Released towards the end of 2021, Redrawn Figures 1 and Redrawn Figures 1 are two vinyl albums containing reworks and cover versions of songs from the Figures album, created by a series of artists including The Notwist, Carl Stone, Cate Le Bon, Tolouse Low Trax, Vanishing Twin, Felix Kubin, Hello Skinny aka Tom Skinner and several more. The albums also include four self-reworks by Aksak Maboul.

Aksak Maboul's fifth album released in March 2023. Entitled Une Aventure de VV (Songspiel), it's a 63-minute, continuous suite of fifteen pieces, which is described as an "experimental audio play".

Véronique Vincent died on 5 October 2025, at the age of 68. She had just finished writing lyrics and recording her vocals for the band's next album, which should be released sometime within the coming year.

The archival album Before Aksak Maboul (documents & experiments 1969-1977) came out in November 2025. Consisting of a collection of recordings retrieved from reel-to-reel tapes and cassettes, made by Marc Hollander and various friends, it retraces some of the experiments which eventually led to the foundation of the project. It was described as 'a tantalising glimpse into the methods and the madness that helped birth a counterintuitive success story' (The Quietus, UK), 'A richly rewarding exercise in musical archaeology, bursting with bold sounds and original ideas, capturing Belgium’s answer to Can as a rough beat (Uncut, UK), and 'Spellbindingly bonkers. Super-fried and fascinating' (Electronic Sound, UK)

== Members ==
- Marc Hollander – keyboards, reeds, percussion, electronics
- Vincent Kenis – guitar, bass guitar, keyboards, percussion (1977–1978, 1980–1986)
- Véronique Vincent (fr) – vocals (1980–2025; her death)

== Temporary members and guests ==
- Marc Moulin – keyboards (1977)
- Chris Joris – keyboards, soprano saxophone (1977–1978)
- Catherine Jauniaux – singing (1977, 1979)
- Frank Wuyts – percussion, keyboards (1977–1979)
- Michel Berckmans – bassoon, oboe (1978–1980)
- Denis van Hecke – cello (1978–1979)
- Geoff Leigh – saxophones (1978–1979)
- Guigou Chenevier – drums (1978)
- Fred Frith – guitars, bass (1979)
- Chris Cutler – drums (1979)
- Bob Vanderbob – saxophones (1979)
- Alig Fodder — bass (1980)
- Yvon Vromman – guitar, vocals (1980–1981)
- Gérald Fenerberg – guitar (1980–1981, 1986)
- Jean-François Jones Jacob III – drums (1980–1981)
- Clément Marion – guitar (2010)
- Faustine Hollander – guitar, bass, vocals (2010, 2015–present)
- Sebastiaan Van den Branden – guitar, bass, synth (2015–2017)
- Christophe Claeys – drums (2015)
- Erik Heestermans – drums, percussion (2016–present)
- Lucien Fraipont – guitar (2016–present)
- Benjamin Glibert – guitar (2016)
- Julien Gasc – keyboards, vocals (2016)

== Discography ==
=== Studio albums ===
- Onze Danses Pour Combattre la Migraine (LP 1977, Kamikaze Records, Belgium / LP reissued in 1980 and 2015 on Crammed Discs, Belgium)
- Un Peu de l'Âme des Bandits (LP 1980, Crammed Discs / CD 1995/ LP reissue with 10-track bonus album [unreleased live & demos cuts] Before And After Bandits, 2018, Crammed Discs)
- Ex-Futur Album by Véronique Vincent & Aksak Maboul (CD/LP 2014, Crammed Discs)
- Figures (2LP/2CD 2020, Crammed Discs)
- Une Aventure de VV (Songspiel) (2LP/CD 2023, Crammed Discs/Made To Measure)
- Before Aksak Maboul (documents & experiments 1969-1977) (LP/CD/digital 2025, CrammedLab

=== Remix albums ===
- 16 Visions of Ex-Futur by Véronique Vincent & Aksak Maboul (CD/LP 2016, Crammed Discs): reinterpretations by Laetitia Sadier, Jaakko Eino Kalevi, Aquaserge, Flavien Berger, Lena Willikens, Forever Pavot, Burnt Friedman, Nite Jewel and more.
- Redrawn Figures 1 & 2 (two separate LPs, 2020, Crammed Discs): reinterpretations by The Notwist, Cate Le Bon, Vanishing Twin, Felix Kubin, Kate NV, Tolouse Low Trax, Matias Aguayo etc, plus 4 self-reworks by Aksak Maboul.

=== Appears on ===
- Various artists: Recommended Records Sampler (2LP 1982, Recommended Records) – Aksak Maboul / The Honeymoon Killers contribute on one track, "Boss De Crosses Dans Le Doulos".
- Various artists: Made to Measure Vol. 1 (LP 1984, Made To Measure/ Crammed Discs, Belgium) – Aksak Maboul contribute seven tracks of new material
- The Honeymoon Killers: Les Tueurs De La Lune De Miel (CD 2003, Crammed Discs) – Reissue includes four live bonus tracks by Aksak Maboul / The Honeymoon Killers
- Various artists: Tradi-Mods vs Rockers: Alternative Takes on Congotronics (2CD 2010, Crammed Discs) – Aksak Maboul contribute one track, a rework of a song by Kasai Allstars
- Various artists: Give Me New Noise – Half-Mute Reflected (LP+CD 2016, Crammed Discs) – Aksak Maboul contribute one track, a cover of Tuxedomoon's Tritone.

== Aksak Maboul in the press ==
- The Belgian experimental group Aksak Maboul were – and are – out there on their own... revelatory" (The Quietus, UK)

On the reissue of Onze danses pour combattre la migraine:

- A significant record... way ahead of its time (Gilles Peterson)
- A truly extraordinary thing, prescient yet off-piste (The Arts Desk, UK)
- One of the most beguiling albums released during the post-punk era... bafflingly timeless (FACT, UK)
- A stew of imaginary world music, rock, electronics and proto-techno (MOJO, UK)

On the reissue of Un peu de l'âme des bandits:

- As if Pere Ubu got together with Faust to cover Igor Stravinsky (Byte FM, DE)
- Eclectic, inventive, inquisitively playful and surreal... simply indispensable (The Wire, UK)
- Jazz meets avant-classical, while brittle electronics spray delirious nonsense into the air (Uncut, UK)
- The Belgian art-rockers [in] a knotty experiment that freely slams together the sounds of contemporary classical music and free jazz (Pitchfork, USA)

On Ex-Futur Album:

- A floating pop dream (The Quietus, UK)
- An electropop miracle... Too avant-garde at the time, perfect for today (les Inrockuptibles, FR)
- Adorably unfinished and delightfully imperfect (Vogue, DE)
- So ahead of the curve it sounds like it was recorded yesterday (The Crack, UK).

On Figures:

- The long-running Belgian avant-garde band explore complicated gender dynamics on their ambitious new double album (Pitchfork, US).
- Brings their stylized shapeshifting to the 21st century... uniting a fascinating beam of novel sounds in thought-provoking ways (Pop Matters, US)
- Inventive arrangements and programming... so exhilarating and durable... mischievous and purposefully eclectic... wide-ranging appeal... (The Wire, UK)
- 75 minutes of scampering, genre-agnostic fun... Aksak's questing spirit is very much intact... (Uncut, UK)
- Totally pop, yet psychedelic... the pop and avant elements perfectly complement one another... You can also dance to it (The Quietus, UK)
- A masterful lesson in contemporary pop. Jumps from the craziest experimentations to irresistible pop songs, with joyful ease (Les Inrockuptibles, FR)
- The rebirth of a band which escapes all categories... a unique weaving of pop and mischievous, poetic songs (Le Monde, FR)
- Inspiring and exhaling more music and more poetic figures in 22 tracks than most people do in 22 albums - if not 22 lives (Libération, FR)
- The focus is on playfulness and the joy of experimenting. And these delights are contagious (ByteFM, DE)

On recent live shows:

- A miracle: the resurrected Aksak Maboul unfolds a brand of synthetic, fleshy pop, with fat, enchanting grooves, sparkling melodies and lyrics. Between echoes of Brigitte Fontaine circa 'Comme à la radio' and strains of Tom Tom Club. (Télérama, FR)
- The pop immediacy of the songs gets enriched by experimental tangents, between electronic music, krautrock and jazz, which raise the bar to unexpected heights (Le Soir, BE)

== See also ==
- Romantic Warriors II: A Progressive Music Saga About Rock in Opposition
