= The Honeymoon Killers (disambiguation) =

The Honeymoon Killers is a 1970 American film.

The Honeymoon Killers may also refer to:

- The Honeymoon Killers (American band), New York noise rock band
- The Honeymoon Killers (Belgian band), Belgian experimental rock band
