= Onze Danses Pour Combattre la Migraine =

Studio album by Aksak Maboul
- Released: 1977
- Recorded: April–May 1977
- Genre: Avant-rock
- Length: 47:06
- Label: Kamikaze (Belgium) re-issued on Crammed Discs
- Producer: Marc Hollander, Marc Moulin, Vincent Kenis

Aksak Maboul chronology
Onze Danses Pour Combattre la Migraine (1977)	Un Peu de l'Âme des Bandits (1980)

Professional ratings
Review scores
Source	Rating
Gibraltar	favourable
Clouds and Clocks	favourable

Onze Danses Pour Combattre la Migraine (English: Eleven Dances for Fighting Migraines) is the debut album by Belgian avant-rock band Aksak Maboul. It was largely the work of one of the band's co-founders, Marc Hollander and was credited to Marc Hollander/Aksak Maboul. It was released on LP in 1977 on a Belgian independent record label, Kamikaze Records, and later re-released twice on Hollander's own Crammed Discs label: on LP in 1981, and on CD in 2003.

== Content and reception ==
Onze Danses Pour Combattre la Migraine comprises 17 tracks that draw on a mix of musical forms, cultures and genres. With drum machines and looping organ lines, they shuffle between improvised jazz, ethnic music, electronics and classical music. It is largely an instrumental album with snatches of singing and voices.

After the success of Aksak Maboul's second album, Un Peu de l'Âme des Bandits (1980), Onze Danses Pour Combattre la Migraine "became a cult album in its own right." The Gibraltar Encyclopedia of Progressive Rock described the album as "a masterpiece. The pieces range from Satie-esque to structured Zappa-inspired rock, to very loose improv-jazz, and the execution in these diverse musical areas is extremely successful. Overall, the music has a certain lightness and humorous approach that I find all too rare in most prog and jazz."

The vinyl reissue of Onze Danses Pour Combattre la Migraine in 2015 elicited enthusiastic media reactions such as: "Onze Danses… remains one of the most beguiling albums released during the post-punk era… It’s that rare type of album that takes its influences and fuses them into new hybrid forms that move beyond pastiche and toward wholly new styles and structures. It’s easy now to see just how relevant Aksak Maboul remain in the landscape of the era; it’s an album that is somehow both very much of its time, and bafflingly timeless." (FACT, UK). "It's a truly extraordinary thing, prescient yet off-piste… the whole album looks into the future, to the eclecto-mania of electronic musicians… Best of all, it's fascinatingly listenable, and reproduced beautifully on vinyl." (The Arts Desk, UK). "Although it was initially released three years before the label was founded, Marc Hollander's Onze Danses captures everything that the label has come to stand for. Fearlessly inventive, miles ahead of its time and basically impossible to categorise, the tone is set on the (literally) kraut-ish proto techno opener "Saure Gurke", which he had no right to conceive as early as 1977. Amid the naive afro-futurist electronics is a deeply European consciousness, drawing from snatches of Balkan folk and the Parisian free jazz renaissance to create a restrained minimal tapestry. " (The Vinyl Factory, UK). "A visionary album" (Libération, FR). "Visionary... heights of fantasy and inventivity" (Les Inrockuptibles, FR)

== Track listing ==
All tracks are composed by Marc Hollander, except where noted.

Side A

1. "Mercredi Matin" – 0:22
2. "(Mit 1) Saure Gurke (Aus 1 Urwald Gelockt)" – 2:25
3. "Animaux Velpeau" – 0:34
4. "Milano per Caso" (Paolo Radoni) – 3:18
5. "Fausto Coppi Arrive!" – 1:08
6. "Chanter est Sain" – 3:09
7. "Son of l'Idiot" – 3:20
8. "DBB (Double Bind Baby)" – 3:25
9. "Cuic Steppe" – 4:20
10. "Tout les Trucs qu'il y a là dehors" – 1:55

Side B

1. "Ciobane" (trad. - arr. Marc Hollander) – 0:21
2. "The Mooche" (Duke Ellington) – 1:35
3. "Vapona, Not Glue" (Vincent Kenis/Hollander) – 6:40
4. "Glympz" (Kenis/Hollander) – 4:49
5. "Three Epileptic Folk Dances" – 2:16
6. "Autre Chose D'Autre" – 0:45
7. "Mastoul Alakefak" – 6:14
8. "Comme on a dit" (Chris Joris/Hollander) – 1:15

== Personnel ==
- Marc Hollander – piano, Farfisa organ, Fender Rhodes, percussion, drum machine, xylophone, mandolin, alto saxophone, flute, clarinet, bass clarinet
- Vincent Kenis – accordion, guitar, slide guitar, bass guitar, keyboards, percussion
- Chris Joris – Fender Rhodes ("Mastoul Alakefak"), soprano saxophone ("Comme On a Dit")

=== Guests ===
- Paolo Radoni – guitars ("Milano per Caso")
- Jeannot Gillis – violin ("Milano per Caso")
- Catherine Jauniaux – voice ("Milano per Caso", "Mastoul Alakefak")
- Lucy Grauman – voice ("Chanter Est Sain")
- Ilona Chale – voice ("Chanter Est Sain")
- "Juliette" – voice ("Tout les Trucs Qu'il y a là Dehors")
- Lee Schloss – soprano saxophone ("Comme on a Dit")

=== Production ===
- Recorded April to May 1977 by Dan Lacksman and Vincent Kenis
- Mixed by Dan Lacksman
- Produced by Marc Hollander, Marc Moulin and Vincent Kenis

== Re-issues ==
In 1981 Onze Danses Pour Combattre la Migraine was re-issued on LP on Marc Hollander's Crammed Discs label. It contained an extra track, "Mastoul, One Year Later (live)" that was appended seamlessly to the end of "Mastoul Alakefak". The following guest musicians played on this live recording:

- Frank Wuyts – keyboards
- Denis Van Hecke – electric cello
- Michel Berckmans – bassoon
- Geoff Leigh – saxophone

In 2003 Crammed Discs released Onze Danses Pour Combattre la Migraine on CD. The linked tracks "Mastoul Alakefak" and "Mastoul, One Year Later (live)" were listed as a single track: "Mastoul Alakefak" – 9:16.

In 2015, Crammed Discs released a new edition of the album on a vinyl LP, with its original 1977 artwork, revised liner notes, a couple of minor changes in the track list, and three bonus tracks (only available as digital downloads): Likembes in Space, Quasi Bou Jeloud and Mastoul Alakefak Improv (the latter featuring Marc Moulin).
