= Liza 'N' Eliaz =

Belgian musical artist (1958–2001)

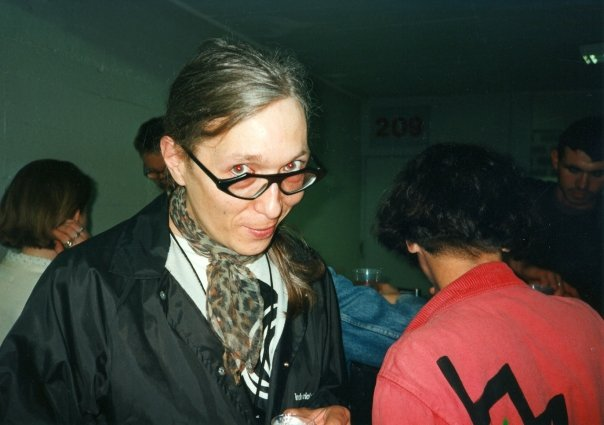

Background information
- Born: 26 February 1958; Ostend, Belgium
- Died: 19 February 2001 (aged 42) Antwerp, Belgium
- Genres: Hardcore; Gabber; Speedcore
- Occupations: DJ; Composer

Liza Néliaz (26 February 1958 – 19 February 2001), known by her stage name Liza 'N' Eliaz, was a Belgian hardcore techno producer and disc jockey. Described as a "spiritual leader" in the free party movement in France, she was a DJ noted for her skill and use of four turntables.

== Biography ==
Liza 'N' Eliaz was born on 26 February 1958 in Ostend to a family of musicians. Assigned male at birth, she began by studying classical music, and played piano with her grandfather, who was conductor of the municipal orchestra of her town. From piano, she moved to keyboard by joining Belgian rock and new wave groups.

Liza 'N' Eliaz's musical career began in the 1980s when she became a member of several Belgian groups, including The Honeymoon Killers, Divorce and Krise Kardiak. In 1985 in a concert where she was playing with Krise Kardiak, she met her future partner, Yvette, who would become her "companion, muse and manager". As well as a performer in groups, she also developed a one-woman show in the 1980s using a range of synthesisers. Liza subsequently settled in Finistère, where she reinvented her musical career.

The inspiration for her stage name came from "Liza", a nickname given to transgender people in Flanders, combined with Néliaz - which is Yvette's last name. Later, at the start of the 1990s, during a rave at the Roxy Club in Amsterdam, she discovered acid house, new beat and an emergent hardcore techno scene. During this period she was inspired to start to DJ herself and was an immediate success. Patrick Rognant of Radio FG regularly invited her on his show. She was one of the first DJs to play three, even four, decks with a technicality that commanded the admiration of her peers. Other collaborators included DJ Dano, Laurent Hô and The Prophet.

Liza 'N' Eliaz died of lung cancer in 2001 in Antwerp.

== Legacy ==
Matthieu Guerre-Berthelot, co-founder of Astropolis said that "We still have the memory of Liza, explaining to us that playing with four turntables was cool, because with four records at 120 BPM, slightly offset, we reached 480 BPM". She is considered a "spiritual leader" in the free party movement in France and is described by Manu Le Malin as a "God in Paris" due to her skill.

In 2023 the Belgian record label USA Import re-released some of her early recordings.

== Discography ==
=== Albums ===
- 1993: Jet Propulsion Mix
- 1995: At the Bunker, Berlin
- 1996: Live At Neuro Act 2 (with DJ Kristian; West Records) (live album)

=== Singles and EPs ===
- 1991: Initial Gain (Atom Records)
- 1992: The Wane In Spain (Atom Communications)
- 1994: Killerbees on Acid (Loop Records)
- 1994: Quantized Particles (with Loren.X.) (Subliminal Records)
- 1995: Energy Boost (with DJ Dano ) ( Mokum Records )
- 1995: Untitled (with LKJ Sisters) (RPG-7)
- 1996: CTRL3 + Operation (with Laurent Ho) (pth007)
- 1996: Pawlow (with DJ Dano) (Mokum Records)
- 1998: Voyager Loops (Provision Records)
- 2000: Voyager Loops 2 (Provision Records)
