= Assume Crash Position =

Album by Konono Nº1

Studio album by Konono Nº1
- Released: 2010
- Venues: Ndjili Quartier Nº1 and Halle de la Gombe, Kinshasa, Democratic Republic of the Congo
- Length: 56:09

Konono Nº1 chronology
Live at Couleur Café (2007)	Assume Crash Position (2010)	Konono Nº1 Meets Batida (2016)

Assume Crash Position is the second album by the Congolese musical group Konono Nº1, and the fourth volume in the group's Congotronics series, released by Crammed Discs.

== Reception ==
Professional ratings
Aggregate scores
Source	Rating
Metacritic	86/100
Review scores
Source	Rating
AllMusic	4.5/5 stars
The A.V. Club	A−
Los Angeles Times	3.5/4 stars
Mojo	4/5 stars
MSN Music (Expert Wtiness)	A−
musicOMH	4.5/5 stars
NME	8/10
Pitchfork	5.7/10
PopMatters	9/10
Uncut	4/5 stars

Thom Jurek, in his review of the album for AllMusic, wrote that, for fans of Konono N°1, "Assume Crash Position is a necessary addition to the catalog. For the intrigued, this is an excellent starting point." Chris Martins of The A.V. Club gave the album a grade of "A−", noting that, despite the band's collaborations with such artists as Björk and Herbie Hancock, the album features "guest appearances not from their international cadre of high-profile fans, but from their friends in Kinshasa." Martins concludes that, after "so many 10-minute epics", the more stripped-down production of the final track on the album, "Nakobala Lisusu Te", "[offers] a glimpse into the soul of the band, which thankfully has been resistant to change."

Douglas Wolk of Pitchfork wrote that the album features the group's signature "amazing sound of electric likembes (metal thumb pianos) playing through fuzzed-up amps and jury-rigged mics, augmented by drums, the occasional whistle, and some call-and-response yelling. Reportedly, the band is used to playing for hours on end. They could go on like that forever, which is both Assume Crash Position's strength and its flaw."

== Track listing ==
All tracks are written by Konono Nº1.

No.	Title	Length
1.	"Wumbanzanga"	11:52
2.	"Thin Legs"	1:59
3.	"Mama Na Bana"	7:46
4.	"Makembe"	10:24
5.	"Fula Fula"	5:06
6.	"Guiyome"	3:11
7.	"Konono Wa Wa Wa"	11:41
8.	"Nakobala Lisusu Te"	4:10
Total length:		56:09

== Personnel ==
Adapted from the album's liner notes.

- Mingiedi Mawangu – likembe, vocals, percussion
- Augustin Makuntima Mawangu – likembe, vocals
- Menga Waku – vocals, bass likembe
- Makona Mbuta – likembe
- Antoine Ndombele – bass likembe
- Pauline Mbuka Nsiala – vocals
- Vincent Visi – drums
- Ndofusu Mbiyavanga – percussion, tam tam
- Duki Makumbu – bass guitar
