= Konono Nᵒ1 =

Congolese musical group

Konono Nº1
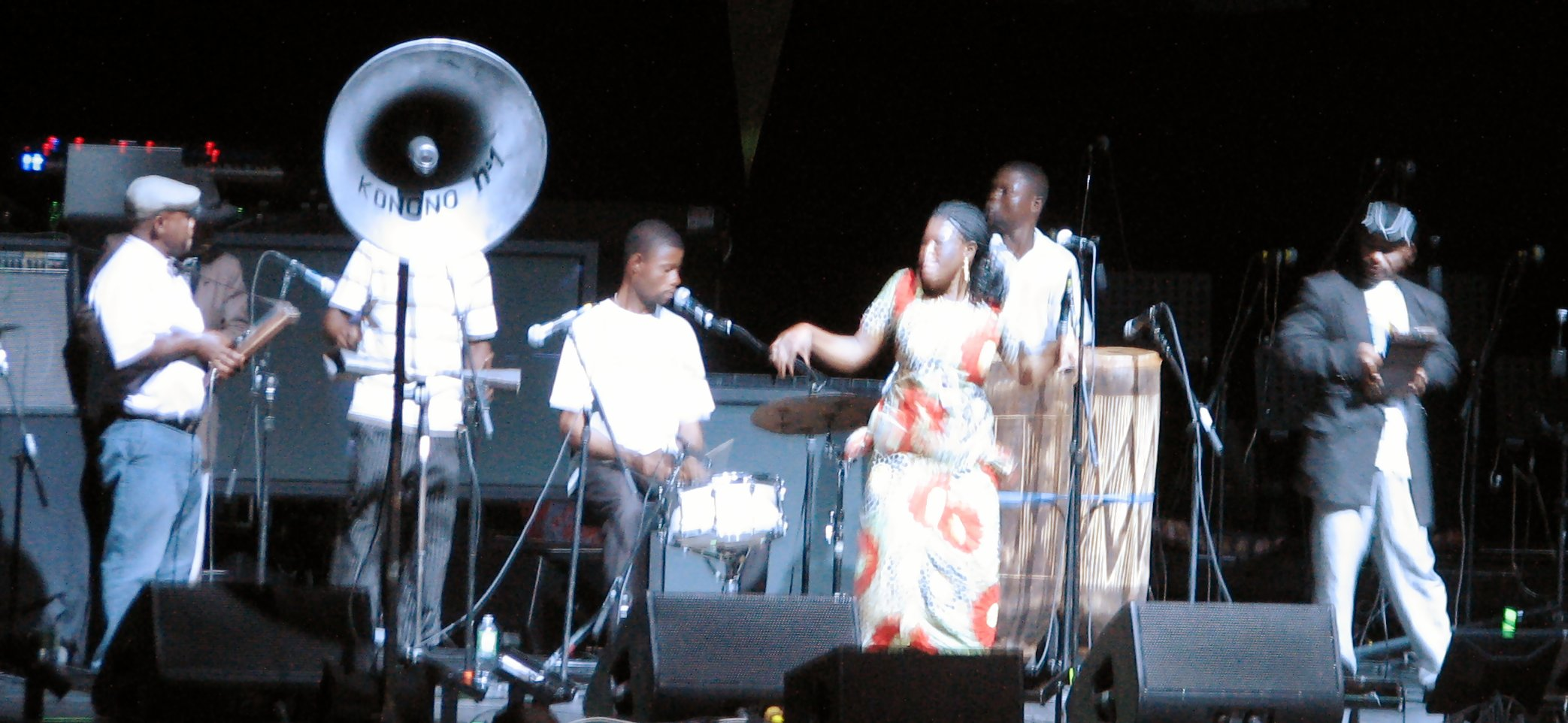
- Konono Nº1 performing in May 2007

Background information
- Origin: Kinshasa, Democratic Republic of the Congo
- Years active: 1966–present
- Labels: Crammed Discs, Ache Records
- Members: Makonda Mbuta; Menga Waku; Pauline Mbuka Nsiala; Vincent Visi; Ndofusu Mbiyavanga
- Past members: Mingiedi Mawangu; Augustin Mawangu Mingiedi

Konono Nº1 is a musical group from Kinshasa, Democratic Republic of the Congo. They are known for their DIY aesthetic, combining electric likembé (a traditional instrument similar to the mbira) with vocals, dancers, and percussion instruments that are made out of items salvaged from a junkyard. The group's amplification equipment is equally rudimentary, including a microphone carved out of wood fitted with a magnet from an automobile alternator and a gigantic horn-shaped amplifier. The genre of the band's music has been characterized as difficult to classify; the group themselves have classified their music under the labels of "tradi-modern" and "Congotronics".

Konono Nº1 achieved international recognition around 2004, with the release of their album Congotronics through the Crammed Discs record label. Appealing to fans of rock and electronic music, they played at the Eurockéennes festival in France the following year. They collaborated with Björk for a song on her 2007 album Volta, and with Herbie Hancock for a song on his 2010 album The Imagine Project. Konono Nº1 released the album Assume Crash Position in 2010, followed by Konono Nº1 Meets Batida (2016), a collaboration between Konono Nº1 and the musician Batida, also known as Pedro Coquenão.

== Etymology ==
The group's full name, as seen on the banner in its music video, is L'orchestre folklorique T.P. Konono Nº1 de Mingiedi; "T.P." (short for tout puissant, or "all powerful") is an homage to the band of the legendary Congolese musician Franco, which was called TP OK Jazz.

== History ==
=== Origins ===
Konono Nº1 originally came from the Kongo or Bacongo region that spans parts of Democratic Republic of the Congo and Angola. The group eventually headquartered themselves in the city of Kinshasa in the DRC.

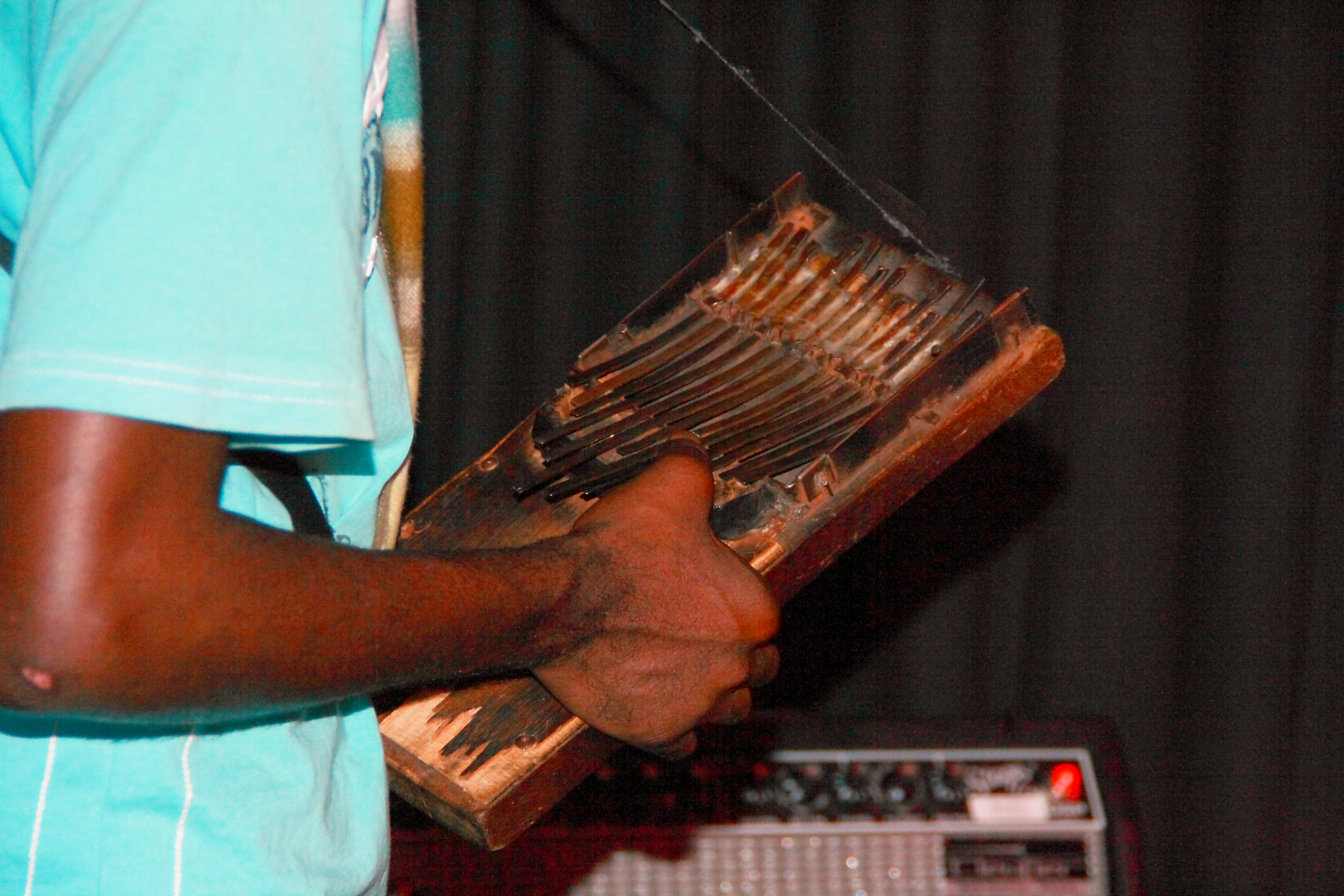
A member of the band playing the likembe, a traditional thumb piano.

The group was formed in 1966 by Mingiedi Mawangu, a likembé player and truck driver. Mawangu was a member of the Zombo (or Bazombo) ethnic group, whose homeland is in Maquela do Zombo, located in Uíge Province of Angola, near the border with DR Congo. For his likembé ensemble, he adapted Zombo ritual music that was originally played by an ensemble of horns made from elephant tusks.

In November 1978 the ensemble called Orchestre Tout Puissant Likembe Konono Nº1 (OR “All-Powerful Likembe Orchestra Konono Nº1”) recorded one track, "Mungua-Muanga," for the compilation album Zaire: Musiques Urbaines a Kinshasa. Since the release of this early recording, Konono Nº1 has influenced many other Congolese popular musicians and groups.

=== 2000s ===
Konono Nº1 first played outside of Africa in 2003 when they toured the Netherlands with Dutch band The Ex. Since this tour The Ex has regularly performed one of Konono Nº1's songs live, appearing on The Ex albums Turn (2004) and Enormous Door (2013) as "Theme From Konono." In 2004 The Ex's guitarist Terrie Hessels released a live recording of a Konono Nº1 performance on his label Terp records. The album, titled Lubuaku, was recorded live in Vera, Groningen, during the band's tour with The Ex.

In 2004 Konono Nº1 began releasing albums through the Belgian label Crammed Discs. The first of these, entitled Congotronics, was produced in Kinshasa by Crammed Discs' Vincent Kenis and released to much enthusiasm from the international press. Since then the group has achieved renown in North America, Europe, and Japan, supported by extensive touring.

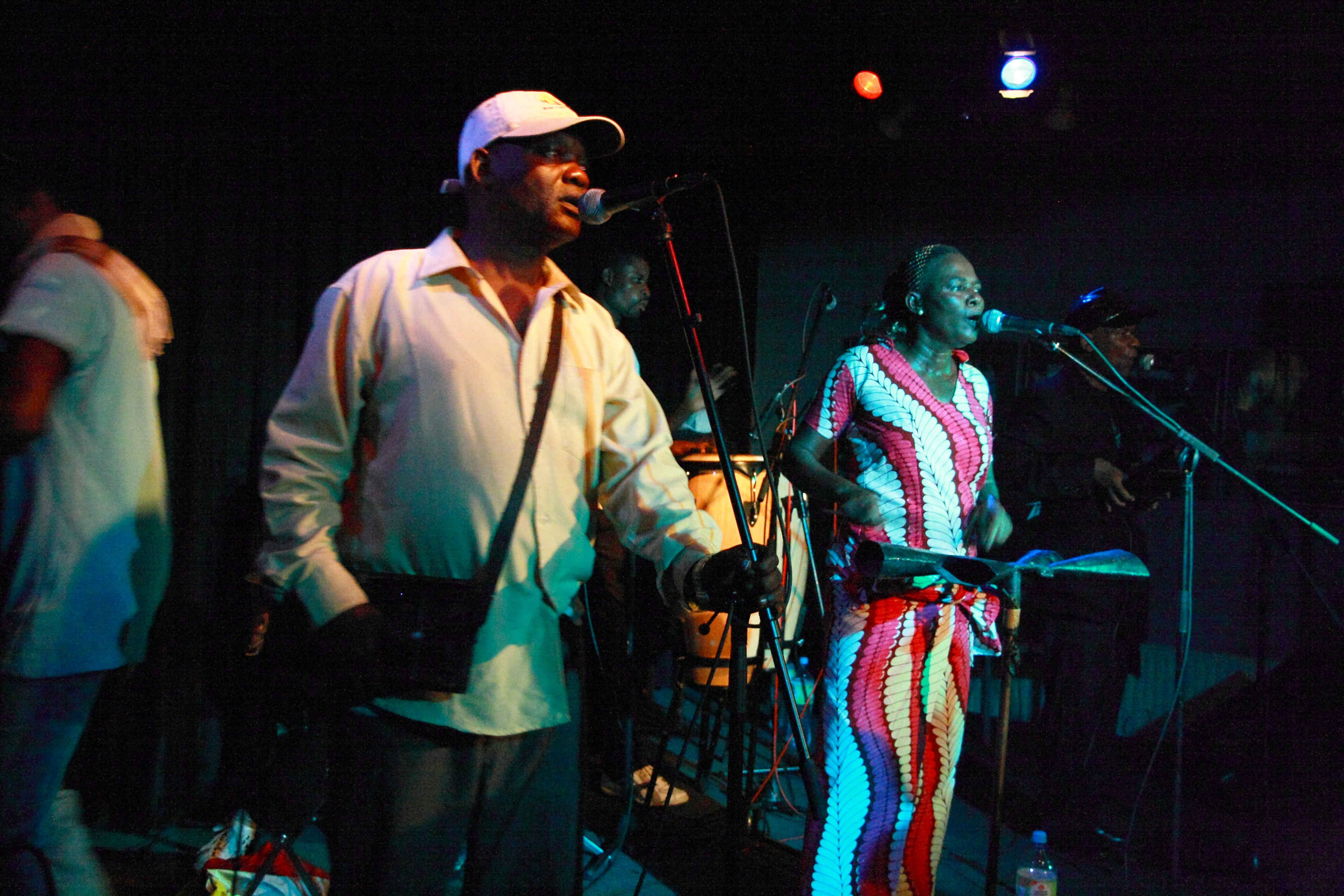
Konono N°1 at Club W71, Weikersheim

In 2006 the band won the Newcomer Award from the BBC Radio 3 Awards for World Music. Konono Nº1's album Live At Couleur Café was nominated for a Grammy Award in 2008.

Konono Nº1 collaborated with Björk on the song "Earth Intruders" from her studio album, Volta. They also accompanied her on her promotional tour for the album in 2007. They also collaborated on "Imagine" for the 2010 Herbie Hancock album, The Imagine Project along with Seal, P!nk, India.Arie, Jeff Beck, Oumou Sangare and others. The song earned the Grammy Award for "Best Pop Collaboration".

=== 2010–present ===
Konono Nº1 were among the musical artists that Matt Groening selected to perform at the edition of the All Tomorrow's Parties festival that he curated in May 2010 in Minehead, England. That same month Crammed Discs released the fourth volume in its Congotronics series, Assume Crash Position, produced by Vincent Kenis. Six months later the label released Tradi-Mods Vs. Rockers: Alternative Takes on Congotronics, a multi-artist album containing interpretations, covers and tributes to the music of Kasai Allstars, Konono Nº1 and other Congotronics bands, recorded by 26 indie rock and electronic musicians, including a.o. Deerhoof, Animal Collective, Andrew Bird, Juana Molina, Shackleton, Megafaun, Aksak Maboul, Mark Ernestus and others.

In 2011, Konono N°1 took part in the Congotronics vs Rockers project, a "superband" including ten Congolese and ten indie rock musicians that included members of Deerhoof, Wildbirds & Peacedrums, Kasai Allstars, and Skeletons, along with Juana Molina. This superband collaborated to create a common repertoire and performed at 15 major festivals and venues in ten countries.

In July 2016, the group was in Romania, and appeared at the Outernational Days festival in Bucharest organized by The Attic magazine and the Control Club.

=== Lineage ===
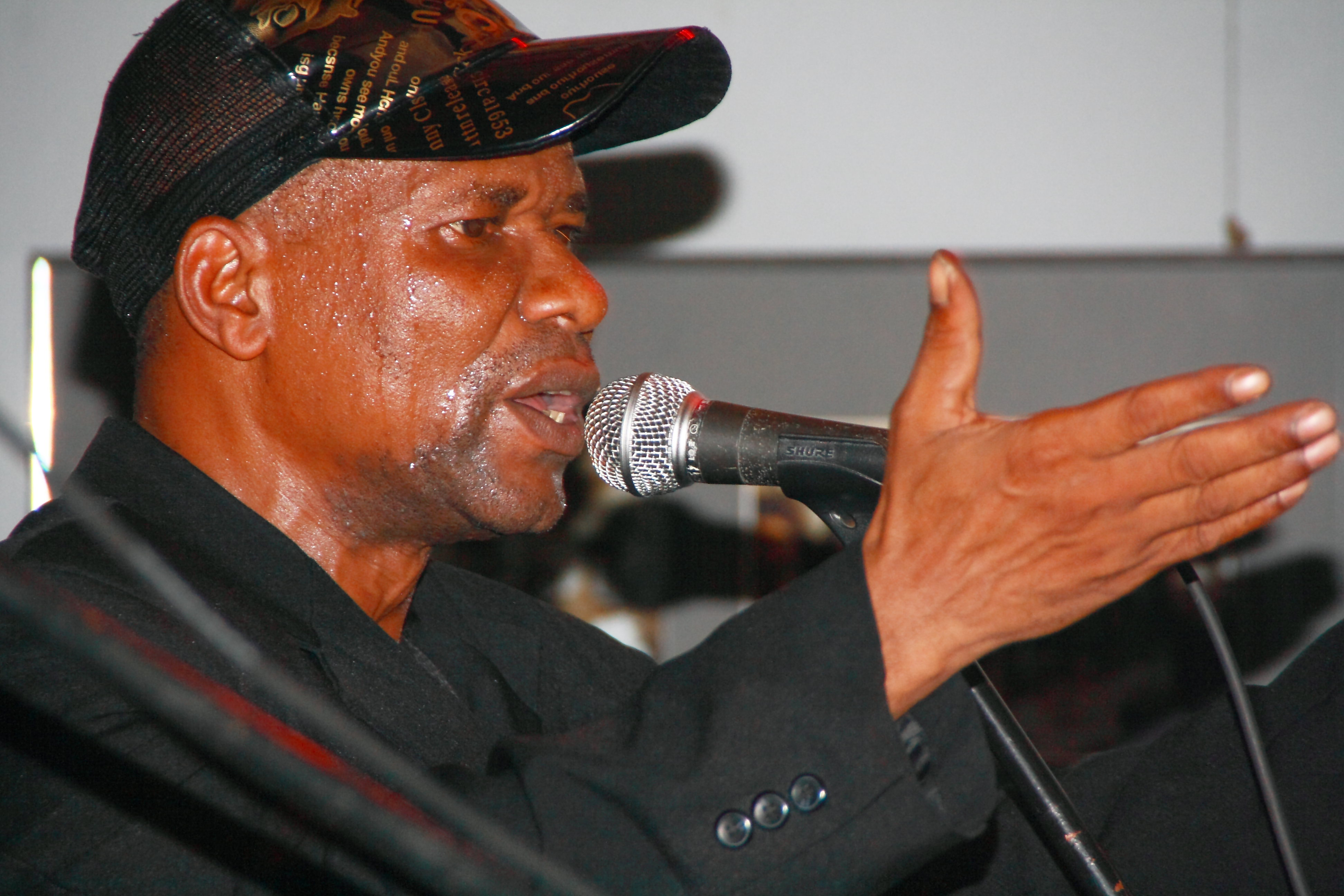
Founder Mingiedi Mawangu in 2011

Konono Nº1 founder Mingiedi Mawangu stopped touring with the band around 2009, and entrusted his duties as band leader and lead likembe player to his son Augustin Mawangu Mingiedi, who further developed the sound of Konono's electric thumb piano by using various effect pedals. Mingiedi Mawangu died on April 15, 2015, aged 85. His son and successor, Augustin, died on October 16, 2017, aged 56. His own son, Makonda, inherited the likembe and leadership.

== Awards ==
- BBC Radio 3 Awards for World Music Newcomer award (2006)
- Grammy Award nomination for Best Traditional World Music Album for Live At Couleur Café (2008)

== Discography ==
=== Albums ===
- Lubuaku (Terp, 2004)
- Congotronics (Crammed Discs, 2004)
- Live at Couleur Café, (Crammed Discs, 2007)
- Assume Crash Position, (Crammed Discs, 2010)
- Konono Nº1 Meets Batida, (Crammed Discs, 2016)
- Where's The One by Congotronics International, the supergroup consisting of Konono N°1, Kasai Allstars, Juana Molina, Deerhoof, Skeletons, Wildbirds & Peacedrums and Vincent Kenis, Crammed Discs (2022)

=== Compilations ===
- Zaire: Musiques Urbaines a Kinshasa (Ocora 559007, recorded 1978, released 1987)
- Congotronics 2 (Crammed Discs, contains one track by Konono Nº1)
- The Congotronics Vinyl Box Set (Crammed Discs, 2010; limited-edition box set containing Konono Nº1's Congotronics and Assume Crash Position, also Congotronics 2, albums by Kasai Allstars and Staff Benda Bilili and a collaboration between Kasai Allstars and Akron/Family)
- Kinshasa 1978, (Crammed Discs, 2019); Includes an original track recorded in 1978, and a remix made in 2019 by Martin Meissonnier, alongside tracks by three other Kinshasa bands)

=== Tributes ===
- Tradi-Mods vs Rockers: Alternative Takes on Congotronics (Crammed Discs, 2010; double CD containing cover versions, reworks and tributes to the music of Konono N°1 and Kasai Allstars by 26 alternative rock and electronic artists)

== See also ==
- Music of the Democratic Republic of the Congo
