= Beware the Fetish =

Studio album by Kasai Allstars
- Released: 24 June 2014
- Genre: Traditional African folk/fusion
- Label: Crammed Discs

Kasai Allstars chronology
In the 7th Moon, the Chief Turned Into a Swimming Fish and Ate the Head of His Enemy by Magic (2008)	Beware the Fetish (2014)

Professional ratings
Aggregate scores
Source	Rating
Metacritic	81/100
Review scores
Source	Rating
AllMusic	4/5 stars
Christgau’s Consumer Guide	(2-star Honorable Mention)
The Guardian	4/5 stars
Mojo	4/5 stars
Pitchfork	7.2/10
Q	4/5 stars
Tom Hull	B+
Uncut	7/10

Beware the Fetish is the second album by Congolese musical collective Kasai Allstars.

== Track listing ==
Disc one
No.	Title	Length
1.	"The Chief's Enthronement/Oyaye"
2.	"Yangye, The Evil Leopard"
3.	"Salute to Kalombo"
4.	"Down and Out"
5.	"He Who Makes Bush Fires for Others"
6.	"As They Walked Into the Forest on a Sunday, They Encountered Apes Dressed as Humans"

Disc two
No.	Title	Length
1.	"Thus Spoke the Ancestors"
2.	"Beware the Fetish"
3.	"A Good Husband"
4.	"In Praise of Homeboys"
5.	"The Dead Don't Dance"
6.	"The Ploughman (Le Laboureur)"

== Reception ==
The album was well received by critics: according to Metacritic, the album has received an average review score of 81/100, based on 8 reviews.
