= The Imagine Project =

Studio album by Herbie Hancock
- Released: June 22, 2010
- Studio: various
- Genre: Jazz
- Length: 66:11
- Label: Hancock
- Producers: John Alagia; Derek Trucks

Herbie Hancock chronology
River: The Joni Letters (2007)	The Imagine Project (2010)

Professional ratings
Review scores
Source	Rating
All About Jazz	4/5 stars
Allmusic	2.5/5 stars
Billboard	4/5 stars
Entertainment Weekly	B+
Jazzwise	3/5 stars
The Guardian	3/5 stars
The New Zealand Herald	2/5
Metro	2/5 stars
PopMatters	5/10
Tom Hull	B

The Imagine Project is the forty-first studio album by American jazz pianist Herbie Hancock, released on June 22, 2010. Prominent guests include John Legend, India Arie, Seal, Dave Matthews, Jeff Beck, Chaka Khan, Tedeschi & Trucks, The Chieftains and Los Lobos.

== Background ==
The album, which was recorded in many locations throughout the world and features collaborations with various artists, was complemented by a documentary about the recording process. Hancock's interpretations of these songs are cross-cultural. His version of "Imagine" was inspired by the Congolese group Konono N°1, and won the 2011 Grammy Award for "Best Pop Collaboration with Vocals" (the final year that that award was given). The instruments used on "The Times, They Are A' Changin" combine the West African kora with the Celtic flute, fiddle and Uilleann pipes. It was released in CD, digital download and vinyl.

== Reception ==
George Varga of JazzTimes noted "This hit-or-miss quality is present throughout the album, which-despite its diverse lineup and lofty ambitions-too often errs on the side of caution and politeness, when risk-taking and surprise would have made this a recording truly worthy of Hancock's expansive skills and imagination". John Eyles of BBC wrote "Ironically, in 2005 Hancock was elected to the Jazz Hall of Fame, since when the jazz aspects of his music have waned. Although The Imagine Project is entertaining and engaging, its jazz content is limited. Fans will hope that the 70-year-old still has another great jazz album in him – preferably alongside Shorter".

== Track listing ==
No.	Title	Writer(s)	Featured artist(s)	Length
1.	"Imagine"	John Lennon	P!nk; Seal; India.Arie; Jeff Beck; Konono N°1; Oumou Sangaré	7:18
2.	"Don't Give Up"	Peter Gabriel	P!nk; John Legend	7:26
3.	"Tempo de Amor"	Vinicius de Moraes; Baden Powell	Céu	4:41
4.	"Space Captain"	Matthew Moore	Susan Tedeschi; Derek Trucks	6:54
5.	"The Times, They Are A' Changin'"	Bob Dylan	The Chieftains; Toumani Diabaté; Lisa Hannigan	8:04
6.	"La Tierra"	Juan Esteban Aristizábal	Juanes	4:50
7.	"Tamatant Tilay / Exodus"	Bob Marley; Alhassane Ag Touhami	Tinariwen; K'naan; Los Lobos	4:45
8.	"Tomorrow Never Knows"	Lennon–McCartney	Dave Matthews	5:21
9.	"A Change Is Gonna Come"	Sam Cooke	James Morrison	8:46
10.	"The Song Goes On"	Larry Klein	K. S. Chithra; Chaka Khan; Anoushka Shankar; Wayne Shorter	7:48
Total length:				66:11

== Personnel ==
Credits adapted from AllMusic

- Herbie Hancock – arrangement, keyboards, piano, prepared piano, production, background vocals
- Alex Acuña – percussion
- John Alagia – production
- Ibrahim Ag Alhabib – background vocals
- Abdallah Ag Alhousseyni – acoustic guitar, background vocals
- Saïd Ag Ayad – djembe, background vocals
- Lawrence Azerrad – design
- Danny Barnes – banjo, bass, guitar
- Jeff Beck – guitar
- Chris Bolster – assistant engineering
- Richard Bravo – percussion
- Kofi Burbridge – Hammond B3, vocals
- Oteil Burbridge – bass, vocals
- Rodrigo Campos – percussion
- Denis Caribaux – engineering
- Céu – vocals
- Matt Chamberlain – drums
- Michael Chaves – guitar
- The Chieftains – featured artist
- K.S. Chithra – vocals
- Vinnie Colaiuta – drums, tambourine
- Kevin Conneff – bodhran
- Rodrigo "Funai" Costa – assistant engineering
- Curumin – drums
- Paulinho Da Costa – percussion
- Toumani Diabaté – kora
- Yaya Diarra – engineering
- Fatoumata Diawara – vocals
- Larry Goldings – Hammond B3
- Bernie Grundman – mastering
- Roland Guillotel – engineering
- Helik Hadar – engineering, mixing
- Elaga Ag Hamid – guitar, background vocals
- Jessica Hancock – production coordination, background vocals
- Lisa Hannigan – vocals
- Ken Hertz – arrangement, production
- David Hidalgo – vocals
- The Hill-Tones – background vocals
- Graham Hope – assistant engineering
- Shantau Hudikar – engineering
- India.Arie – vocals
- Anand Iyer – second engineer
- Juanes – arrangement, vocals, production
- Manu Katché – drums
- Bhawai Shankar Kathak – pakhawaj drum
- Seán Keane – fiddle
- Alan Kelly – assistant engineering
- Chaka Khan – vocals
- Abhishek Khandelwal – assistant engineering, Pro-Tools
- Douglas Kirkland – photography
- Andrew Kitchen – assistant engineering
- Larry Klein – bass, keyboards, background vocals
- K'naan – vocals
- Konono Nº1 – featured artist
- Rhani Krija – percussion
- Abdallah Ag Lamida "Intidao" – guitar, background vocals
- Eyadou Ag Leche – bass guitar, background vocals
- John Legend – vocals
- Hugo Legrand – assistant engineering
- Gustavo Lenza – engineering
- Frank Lillis – lyric translation
- Lionel Loueke – guitar
- Los Lobos – featured artist
- Jim Lowe – engineering
- Conrad Lozano – vocals
- Lucas Martins – electric bass
- Dave Matthews – guitar, vocals
- Mike Mattison – vocal arrangement, vocals
- Ndofusu Mbiyavanga – percussion
- Wagner Bigu Meirinho – assistant engineering
- Cesar Mejia – engineering
- Dani Michelle – wardrobe
- Marcus Miller – arrangement, bass, production
- Bill Mims – assistant engineering
- Mawangu Mingiedi – likembe
- Alan Mintz – executive production, background vocals
- Matt Molloy – flute
- Paddy Moloney – tin whistle, Uilleann pipes
- Mandy Montiero – groomer
- James Morrison – vocals
- Melinda Murphy – executive production, production coordination
- Áine Ní Ghlinn – lyric translation
- Chris Owens – assistant engineering, Pro-Tools
- Dean Parks – guitar
- Sridhar Parthasarthy – mridangam
- Louie Pérez – vocals
- Cindi Peters – production coordination
- P!nk – vocals
- Maria Ruvalcaba – background vocals
- Jaideep Sahni – translation
- Oumou Sangare – vocals
- Brian Scheuble – engineering
- Eric Schilling – engineering
- Seal – vocals
- Anoushka Shankar – sitar
- Wayne Shorter – saxophone (soprano)
- Jaime Sickora – assistant engineering
- Patrick Spain – assistant engineering
- Satyajit Talwalkar – tabla
- Ibrahim Tangara – engineering
- Susan Tedeschi – vocals
- Tinariwen – featured artist
- Bobby Tis – engineering
- Fernando Tobon – guitar
- Alhassane Ag Touhami – arrangement, guitar, vocals
- Derek Trucks – arrangement, guitar, production
- Visi Vincent – drums
- Marty Wall – engineer
- Pete Wallace – keyboards
- George Whitty – keyboards, sound design
- Tal Wilkenfeld – bass
- Bill Winn – engineering
- Richard Woodcraft – engineering

== Charts ==
Chart performance
Chart (2010)	Peak position
Australian Albums (ARIA)	94
Australian Jazz & Blues Albums (ARIA)	1
Austrian Albums (Ö3 Austria)	28
Belgian Albums (Ultratop Flanders)	90
Belgian Albums (Ultratop Wallonia)	85
Canadian Albums (Nielsen SoundScan)	42
Danish Albums (Hitlisten)	11
Dutch Albums (Album Top 100)	35
French Albums (SNEP)	77
German Albums (Offizielle Top 100)	27
Greek Albums (IFPI)	3
Italian Albums (FIMI)	29
Norwegian Albums (VG-lista)	25
Polish Albums (ZPAV)	12
Spanish Albums (Promusicae)	41
Swiss Albums (Schweizer Hitparade)	29
US Billboard 200	54
US Top Jazz Albums (Billboard)	2

== Certifications ==
Certifications
Region	Certification	Certified units/sales
Poland (ZPAV)	Gold	5,000^{*}
^{*} Sales figures based on certification alone.
