= Jupiter Bokondji =

Congolese musician

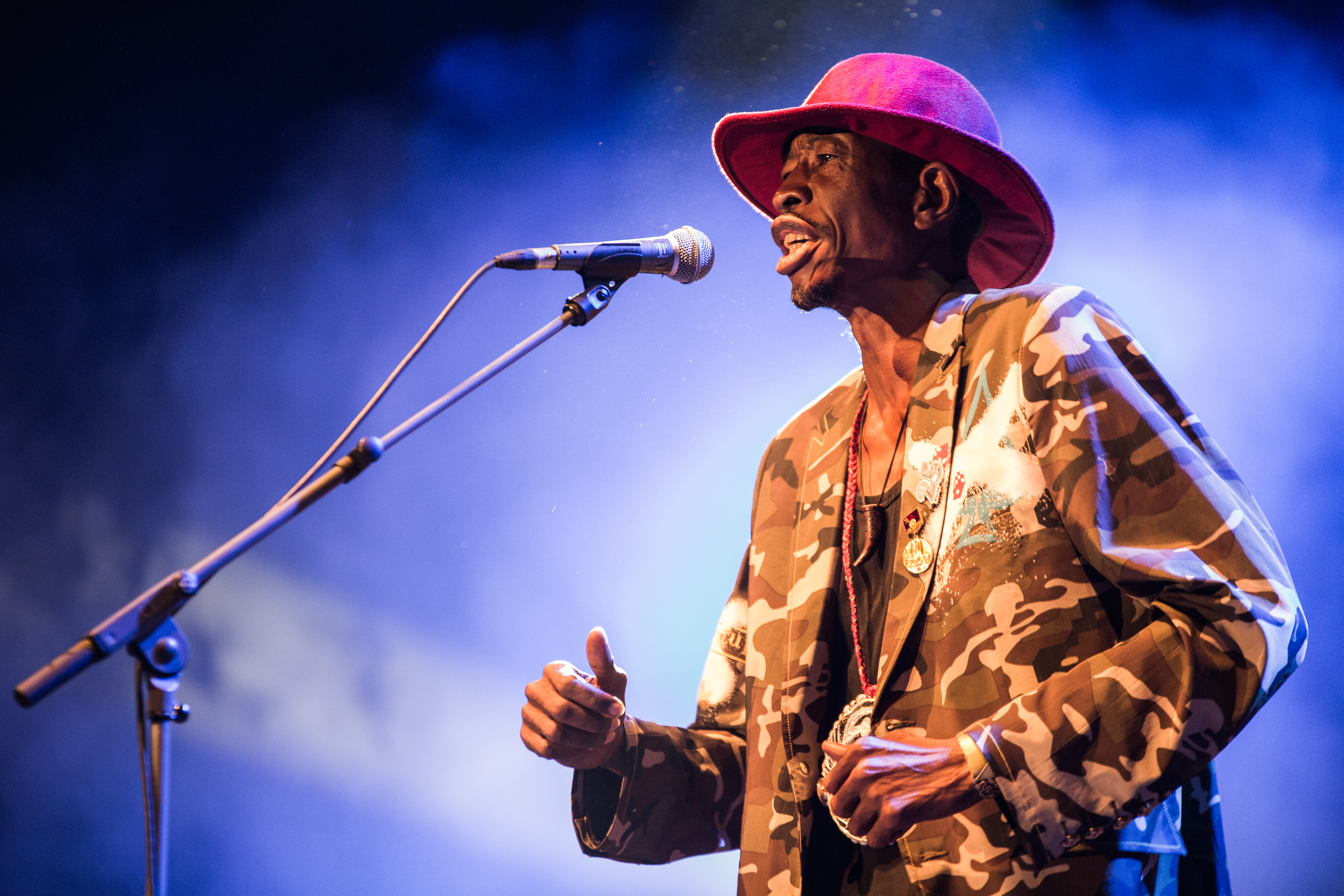
- Jupiter & Okwess at Rudolstadt-Festival 2017
- Born: 16 December 1963 (age 62); Kinshasa, Democratic Republic of Congo
- Website: jupiterandokwess.fr

Jupiter Bokondji (born 16 December 1963) is a Congolese musician. Alongside his band, Okwess International, he released their debut album Hotel Univers in the UK in May 2013. The band was created in 1990, and they toured Africa. However, at the same time that their popularity grew, First Congo War broke out in the Democratic Republic of the Congo. Some band members fled to Europe to escape violence, but Bokondji stayed in Kinshasa. As the war died down, his popularity grew again, and in 2006 he was featured in the documentary Jupiter's Dance. This brought him to the attention of UK producers and musicians, which led to him joining the African Express tour, the production of Hotel Univers, and performing at the 2013 Glastonbury Festival.

Bokondji's sound is a combination of Afropop, traditional Congolese rhythms, funk, and rock music. He calls this distinct sound "Bofenia Rock". His lyrics often carry political or social messages, including criticisms of the Congolese government as well as positive encouragement for Africans to better realize their individual talent and potential.

== History ==
Bokondji was born in Kinshasa. His father was a Congolese diplomat, and his grandmother was a traditional healer. His grandmother got him started in music as he attended ceremonies and funerals with her to play percussion instruments like drums. Later, his father was posted to the embassy in East Berlin, and the family moved to Germany.

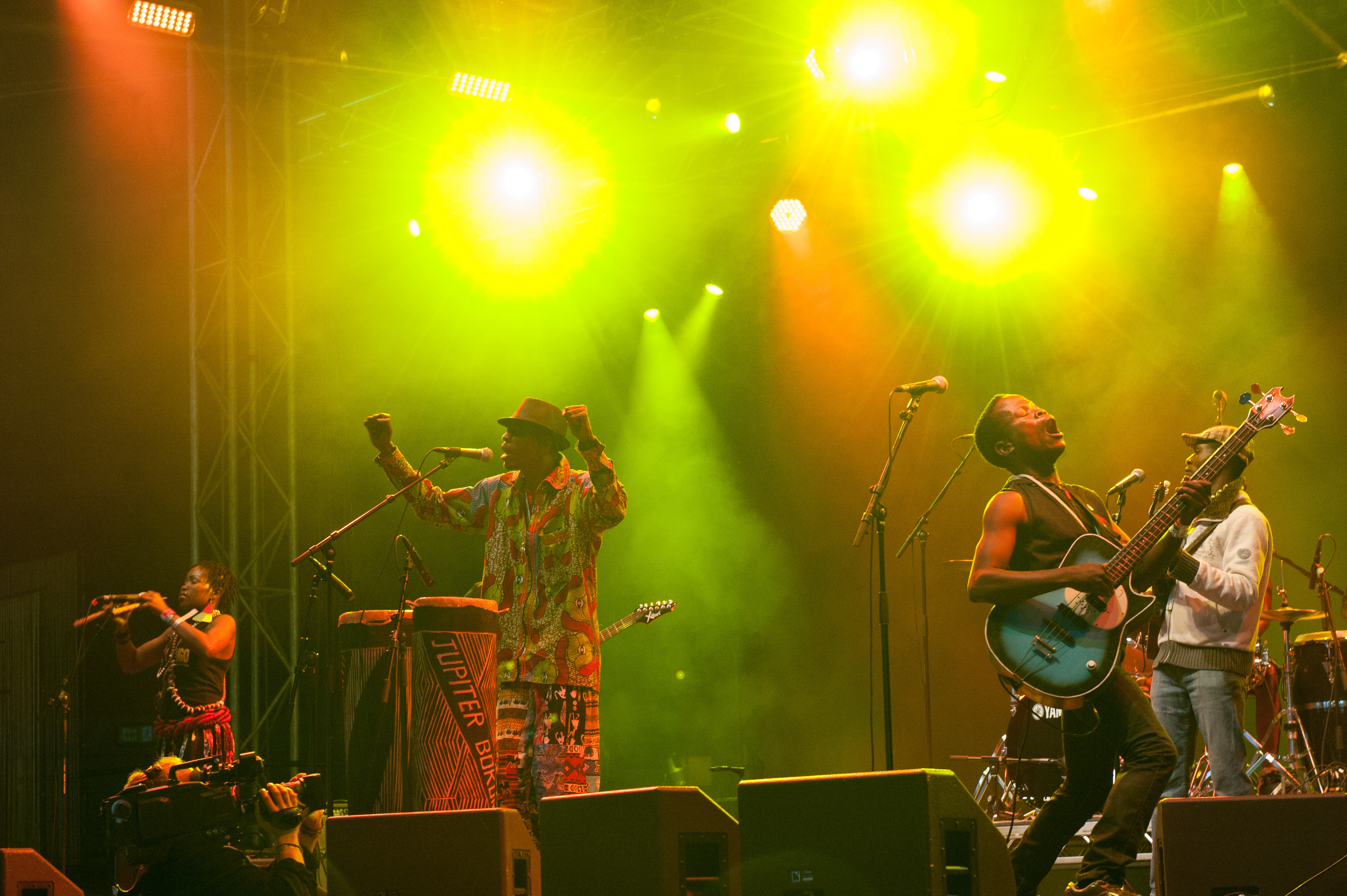
Jupiter Bokondji and Okwess International at Way Out West 2013 in Gothenburg, Sweden

It was in Germany that Bokondji started his band, Der Neger, which combined his native Mongo music style with the European rock style of his German bandmates. His father's posting eventually ended, and the family moved back to Kinshasa in the 1980s. Bokondji traveled around the country listening to music from different tribes and solidifying his own style. He formed an orchestra called Bongofolk in 1984 and Okwess International in 1990.

== International breakthrough ==
French filmmakers Renaud Barret and Florent de la Tullaye met Bokondji in 2004, and he inspired them to create the documentary Jupiter's Dance, which was released in 2006. The film featured music from Okwess as well as Staff Benda Bilili, another band in which Bokondji is involved. This led to more connections in the international music industry, and Bokondji was invited to join the African Express tour in 2012. The tour puts African and UK artists together on a train that tours around Britain, giving performances and promoting cultural exchange. Also in 2012, Bokondji was involved with the DRC Music Project with Oxfam. This allowed him to work with Damon Albarn, of Blur and Gorillaz fame. The band performed at the UK's Womad festival in 2012 and at the Glastonbury festival in 2013. Billed as "Jupiter & Okwess", the band continued to tour through 2019, including in Africa, America, Asia, and Europe.

Jupiter & Okwess was part of the lineup for the 22nd Coachella Valley Music and Arts Festival in April 2023.
