= Staff Benda Bilili =

Group of street musicians from the Democratic Republic of the Congo

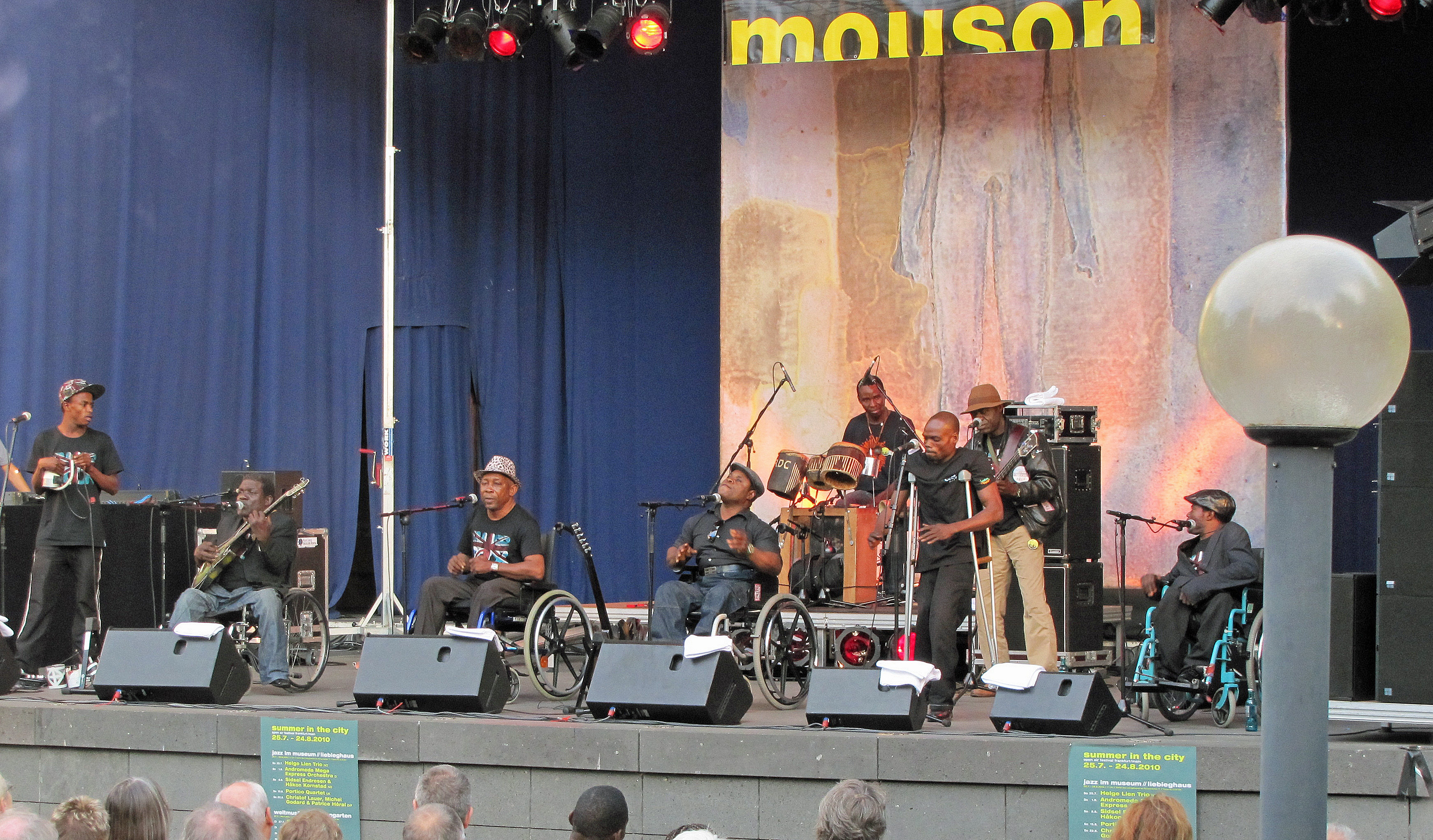
- 2010 at "Palmengarten" in Frankfurt am Main

Background information
- Origin: Kinshasa, DR Congo
- Years active: 2005––present
- Label: Crammed Discs
- Members: Ricky Likabu; Roger Landu
- Past members: Coco Ngambali; Théo Nzonza

Staff Benda Bilili are a group of street musicians in the Democratic Republic of the Congo. They used to live around the grounds of the zoo in the country's capital city, Kinshasa, and play music which is rooted in soukous, with elements of old-school rhythm and blues and reggae. The core of the band consists of four senior singers/guitarists, who are paraplegic (they had poliomyelitis when they were young) and move around in spectacularly customized tricycles. They are backed by a younger rhythm section consisting of abandoned street children who were taken under the protection of the older members of the band. The soloist is an 18-year-old boy (2009) who plays guitar-like solos on an electrified one-stringed lute he designed and built himself out of a tin can. The group's name translates roughly from Lingala as "look beyond appearances".

Staff Benda Bilili earned the 2009 Artist Award at Womex (World Music Expo).

The group has sought to raise awareness about crimes against humanity in Democratic Republic of the Congo, contributing to the Enough Project and Downtown Records' Raise Hope for Congo compilation.

== Background ==
Staff Benda Bilili was formed by Ricky Likabu and Coco Ngambali with other paraplegic musicians, as other bands in Kinshasa would not work with them. They were later joined by a teenager, Roger Landu, who fashioned his own instrument - named a satongé - from an empty fish can, a piece of wood and a guitar string. The band rehearsed in Kinshasa zoo, because it was a quiet location, and played the streets of Kinshasa until they were heard by Vincent Kenis, a Belgian record producer specialising in Congolese music, who arranged for the band to record their debut album, Tres Tres Fort ("Very Very Strong").

== The "voting song" ==
In 2006, Staff Benda Bilili's song "Let's Go and Vote" ("Allons Voter"), written and performed by the musicians, was played repeatedly in the run-up to the 2006 historic polls on radio and television stations; it was reported to be responsible for a 70% increase in voter turnout. The credits on the video clip say it was produced by Monuc UN Mission in DR Congo and distributed by the UN Development Programme (UNDP). The musicians were not offered contracts, but were reportedly paid $50 each. Staff Benda Bilili filed a lawsuit in the Congolese courts seeking $100,000 for Monuc's use of their music.

== The videos and the film ==
Staff Benda Bilili were featured in the documentary film Jupiter's Dance, which follows the story of Jupiter Bokondji, a musician who is also involved in Staff Benda Bilili. The film was produced by Renaud Barret and Florent de la Tullaye (aka Belle Kinoise), who have been documenting the band's progress since 2005. They shot several videos, which have become quite popular on the Internet.

Barret and de la Tullaye directed a feature-length documentary on the band, Benda Bilili! The film was selected by the Quinzaine des Réalisateurs (Directors' Fortnight) at the 2010 edition of the Cannes Film Festival, and premiered on May 13, 2010, with the group in attendance and performing at the opening of the Quinzaine.

== Career ==
Entitled Très Très Fort, the band's debut album was released on Crammed Discs in March 2009. It was produced over the course of three years by Crammed's Vincent Kenis (known for introducing and producing bands such as Konono Nº1, Kasai Allstars, and for the Congotronics series). Kenis recorded the band mostly in the Kinshasa zoo. The album also contains four of Barret & de la Tullaye's videos.

Staff Benda Bilili's Très Très Fort album was also released on vinyl by Crammed Discs in 2010, only as part of the limited-edition Congotronics Vinyl Box Set which includes most albums on the Congotronics series.

Media reactions to Très Très Fort were excellent, especially in the UK, the US, and France.

Staff Benda Bilili have performed extensively around Europe, Japan and Australia, and were to tour the US for the first time in October 2012.

Entitled Bouger Le Monde ('Make The World Move'), Staff Benda Bilili's second album was recorded in Kinshasa and mixed in Brussels, again by producer Vincent Kenis. The album comprises 11 new songs and features lead vocals by seven different band members. It was to be released worldwide by Crammed Discs in September 2012.

In February 2013, The Guardian reported that singer and songwriter Coco Ngambali had quit, along with fellow vocalist Théo Nzonza. Further, a tour of top European venues scheduled for March and April had been cancelled amid accusations of mismanagement. The band played some dates in Europe in the autumn of 2013 and summer of 2014. Ngambali and Nzonza now play in Mbongwana Star.

== Discography (albums) ==
- Très Très Fort (2009, Crammed Discs)
- Bouger Le Monde (2012, Crammed Discs)
- Effacer le tableau (2019, Note A Bene)

== Gallery ==
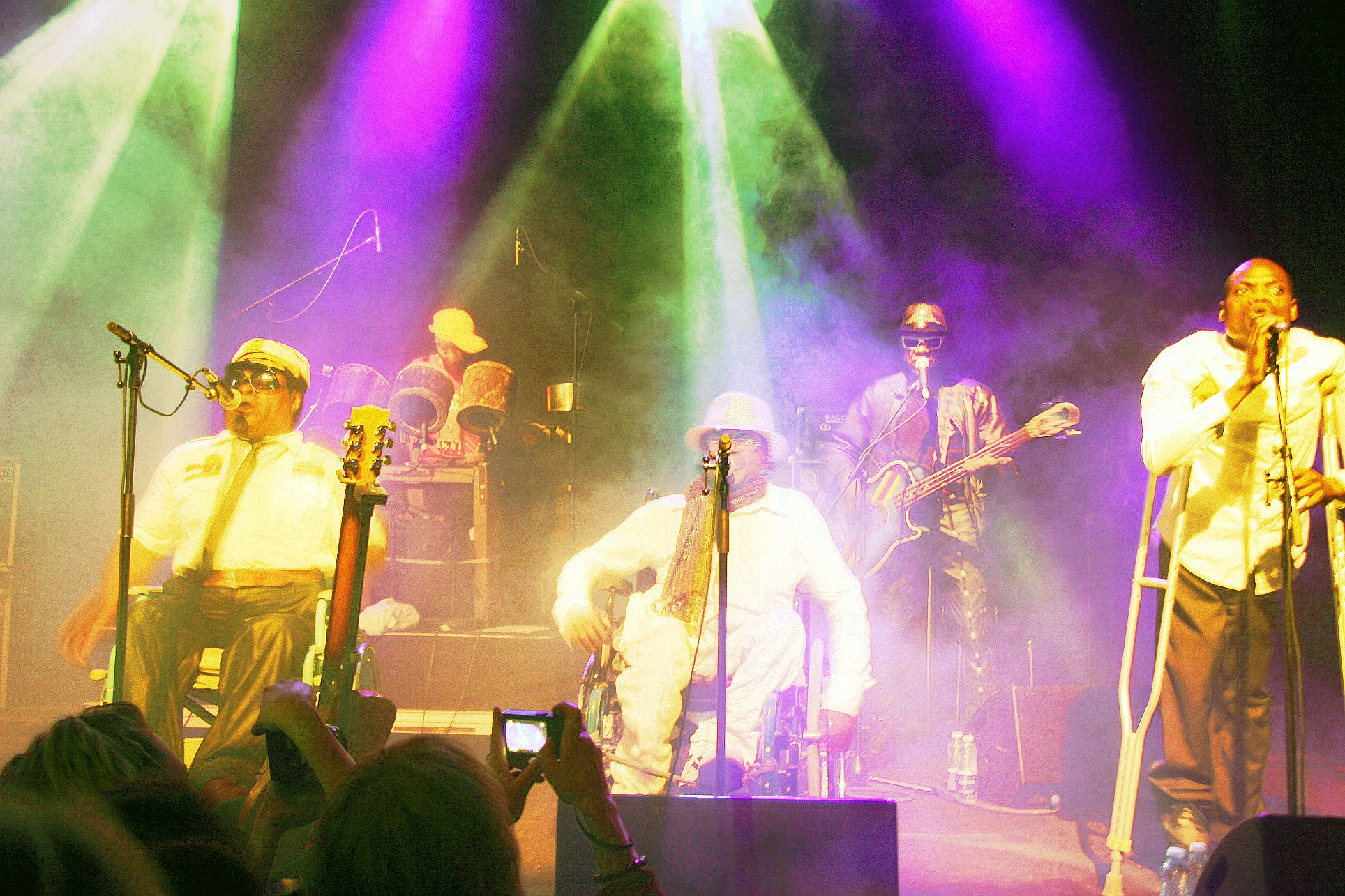
Stockholm, 2012

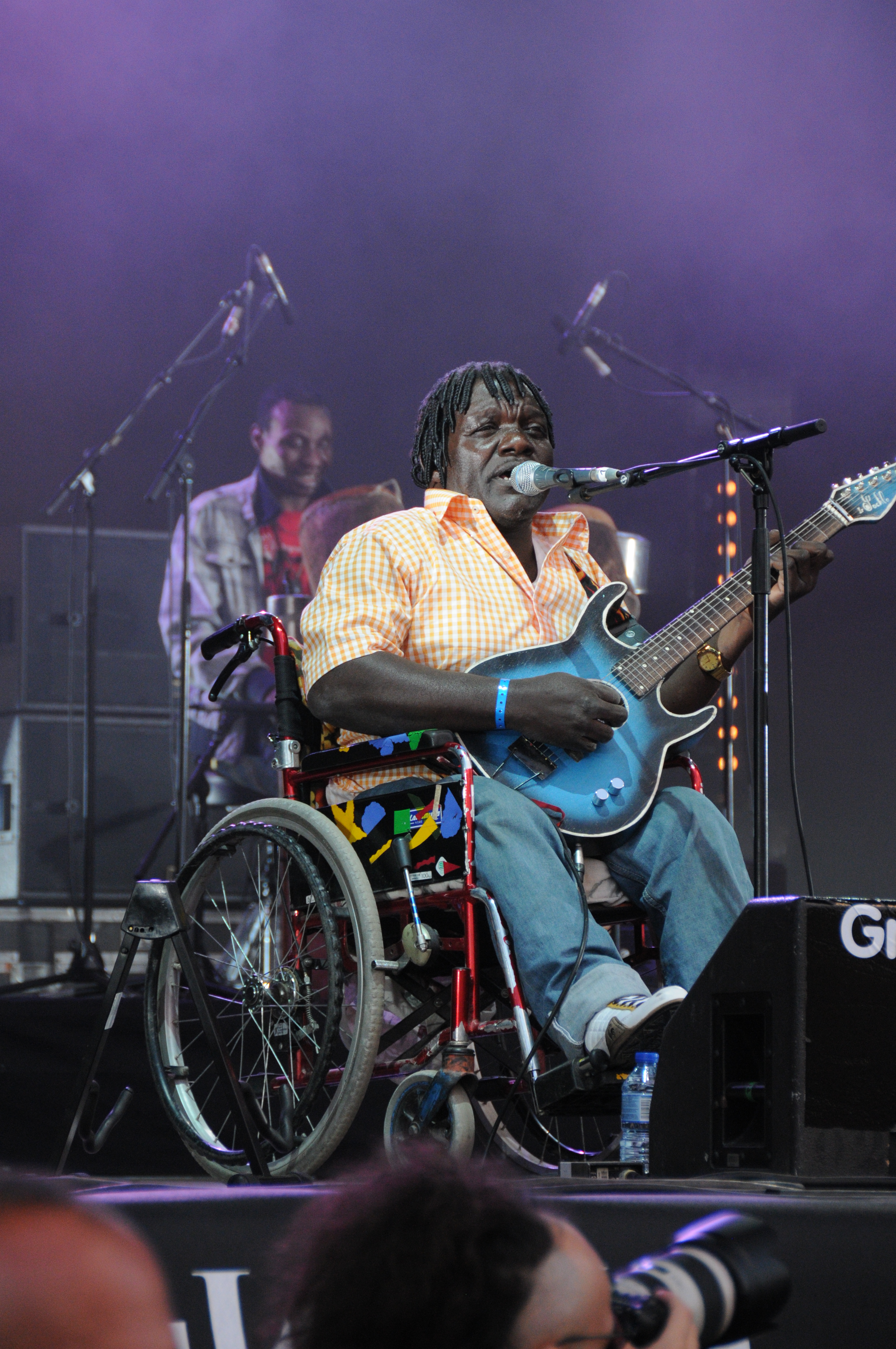
Eurockéennes festival, 2011

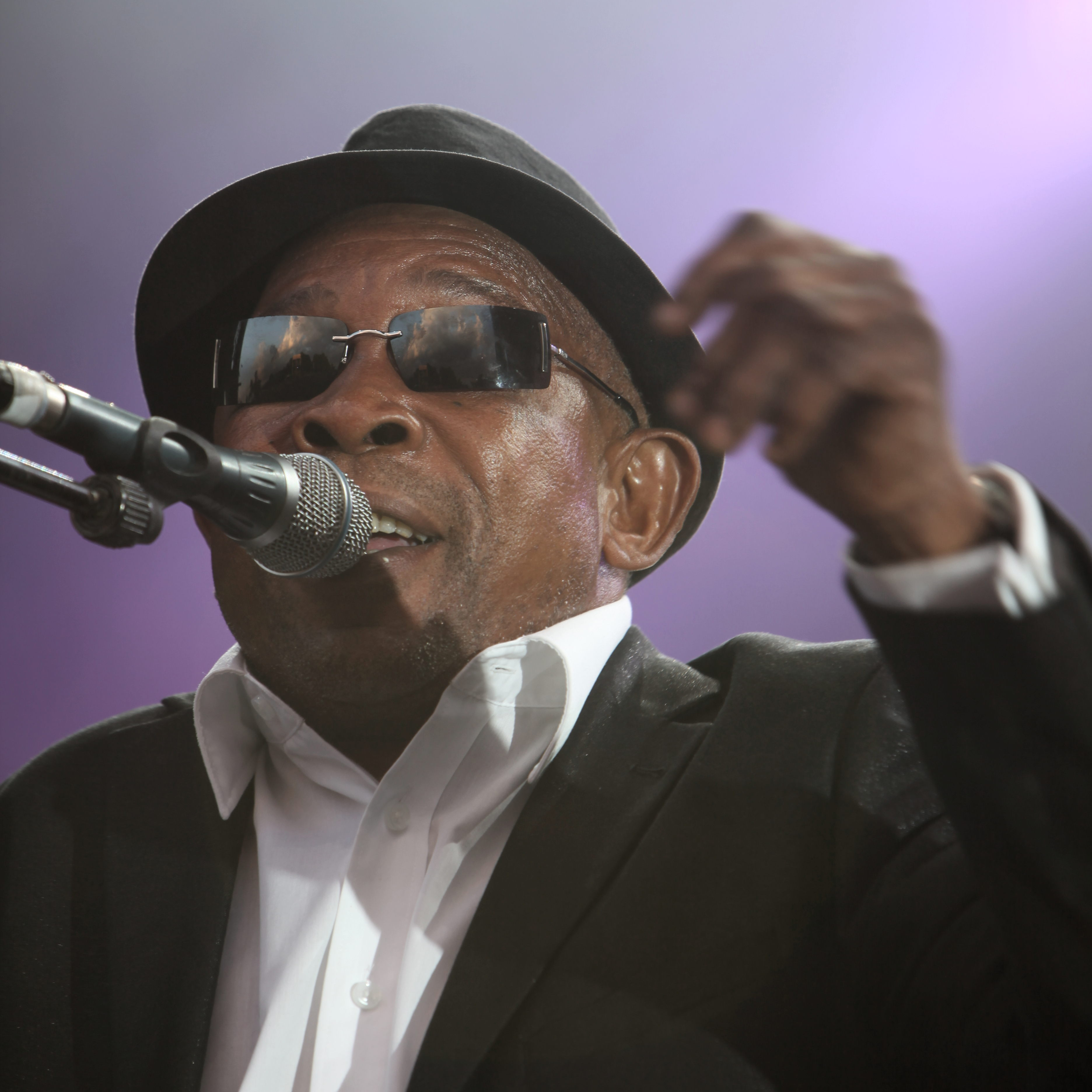
Eurockéennes festival, 2011

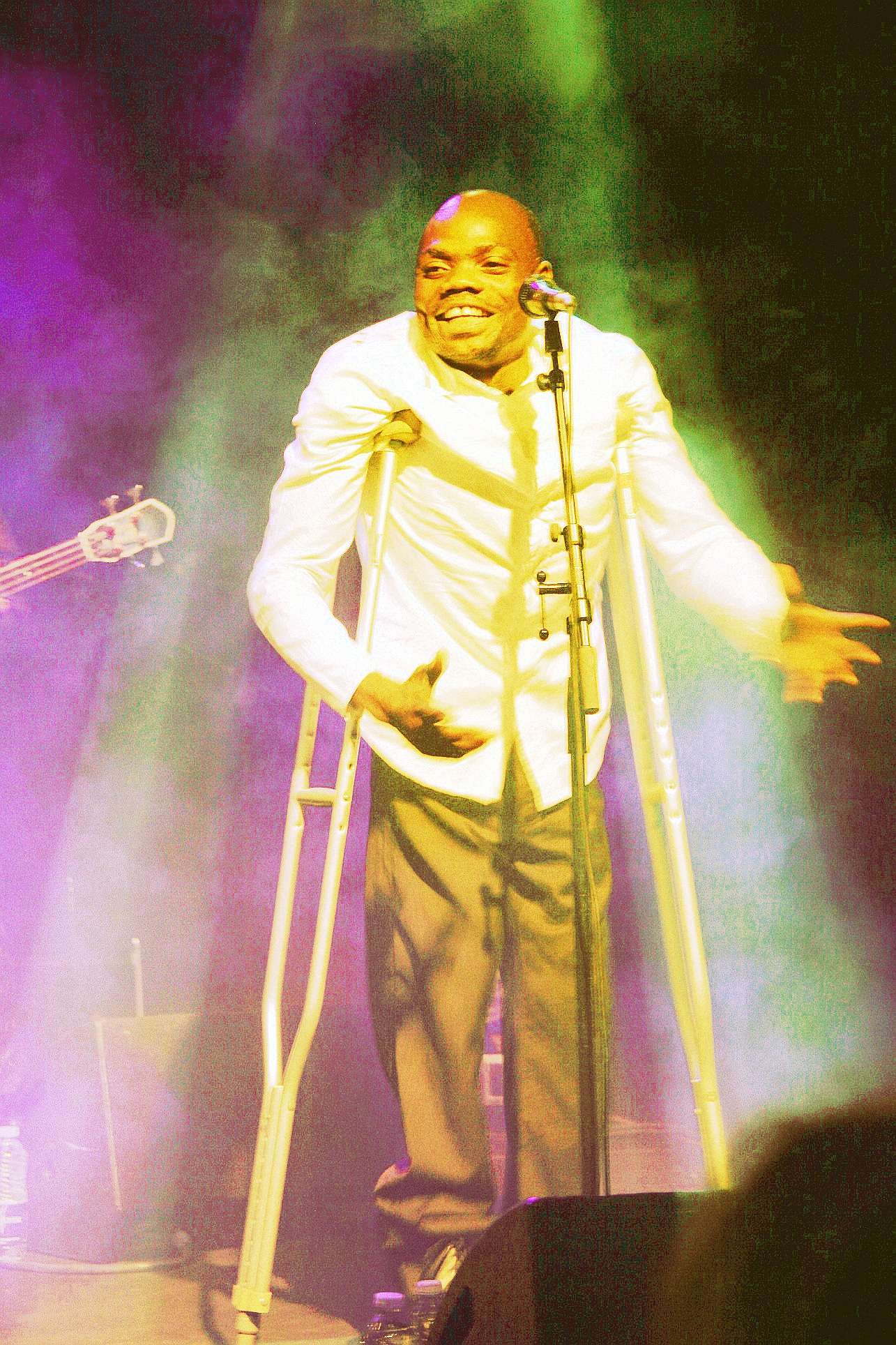
Stockholm, 2012

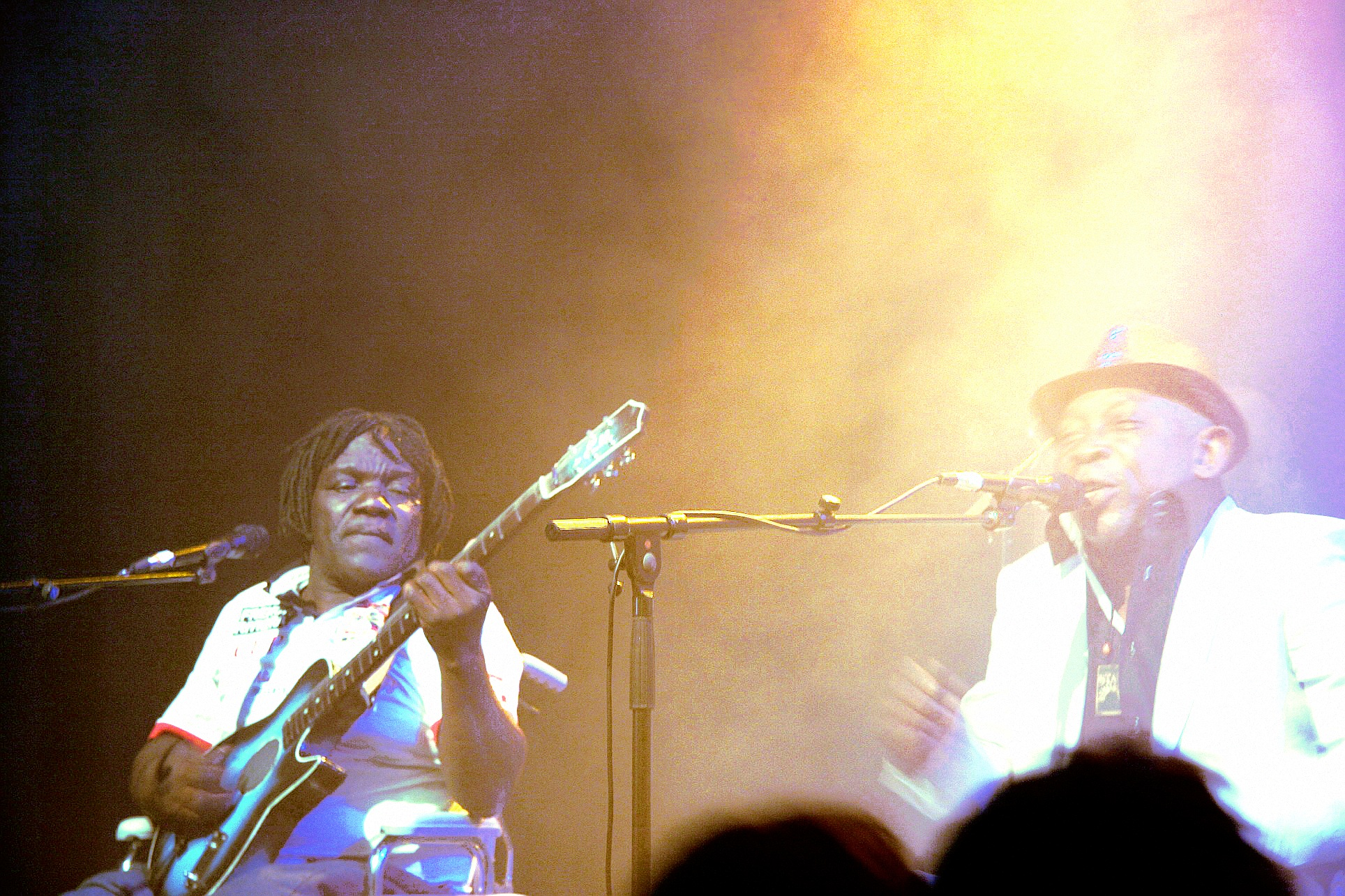
Stockholm, 2012

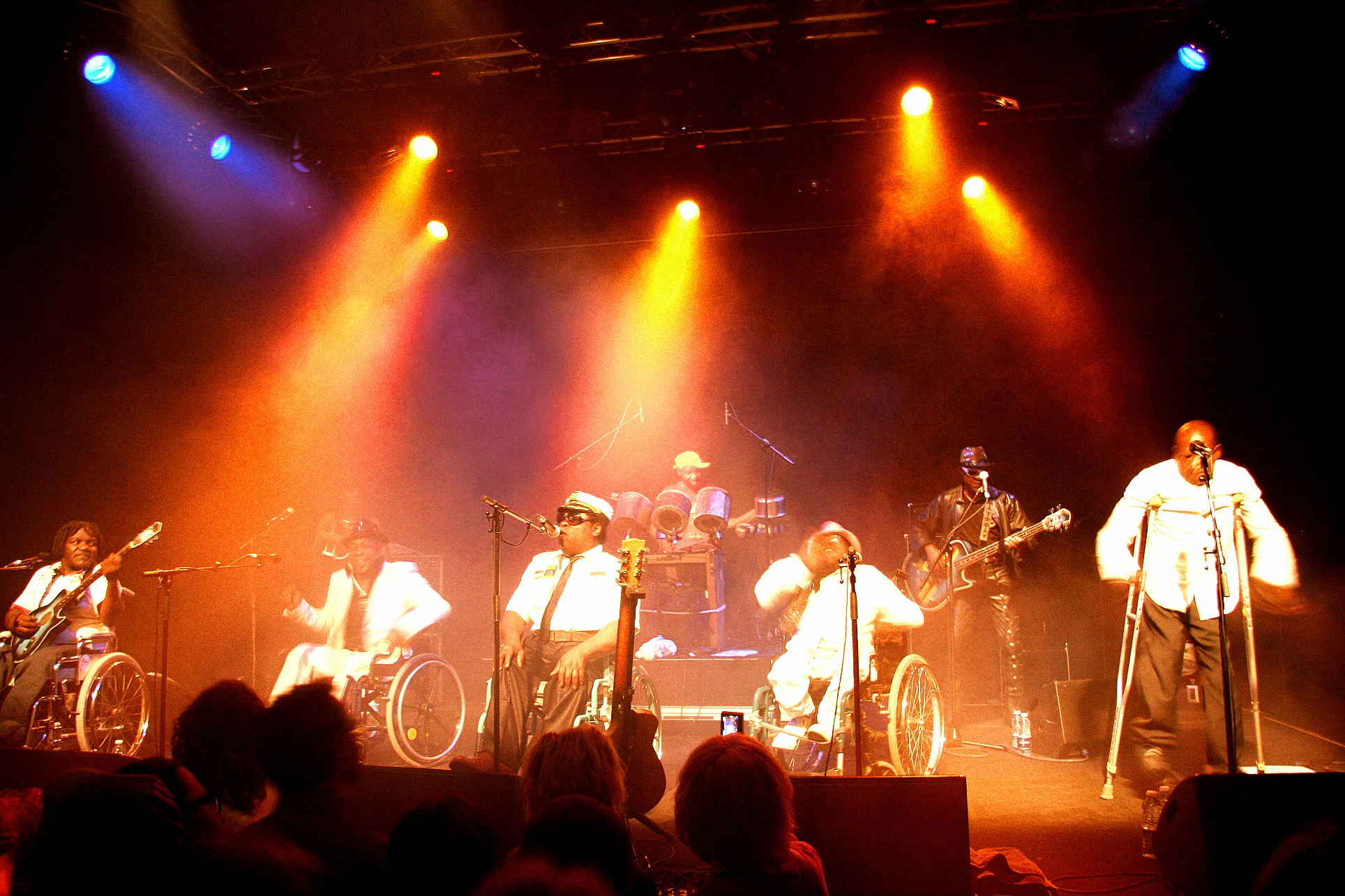
Stockholm, 2012

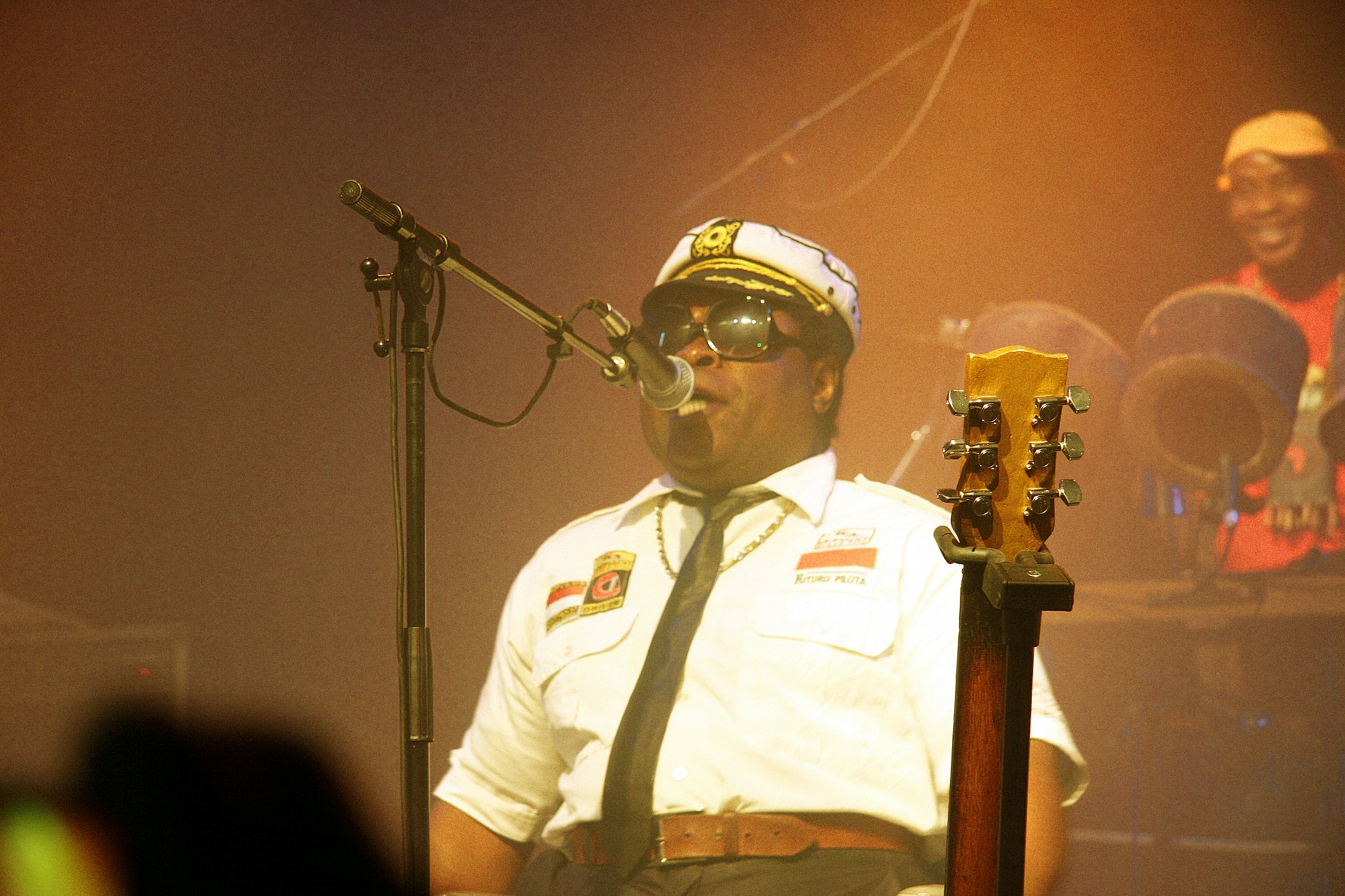
Stockholm, 2012
