= Véronique Vincent =

French-Belgian singer and plastic artist (1957–2025)

- Born: 17 August 1957; Paris, France
- Died: 5 October 2025 (aged 68); Uccle, Belgium
- Occupations: Singer; Lyricist; Visual artist

Véronique Vincent (French: [veʁɔnik vɛ̃sɑ̃]; 17 August 1957 – 5 October 2025) was a French singer, lyricist and visual artist.

She was notably a member of the bands The Honeymoon Killers and Aksak Maboul.

== Death ==
Vincent died of cancer in Uccle on 5 October 2025, at the age of 68.

== Discography ==
=== As a vocalist with The Honeymoon Killers ===
- Histoire à suivre/Route nationale 7 (7" vinyl, 1981)
- Les tueurs de la lune de miel (LP, 1982, CD reissue in 2003, LP reissue in 2016)
- Subtitled Remix (12" EP, 1983)

=== Vocalsi and lyricist ===
- Véronique Vincent & Aksak Maboul: Chez les Aborigènes (single, 2014)
- Véronique Vincent & Aksak Maboul: Ex-Futur Album (album [CD, LP and digital], 2014)
- Véronique Vincent & Aksak Maboul: Ex-Futur Reworks, with Marc Collin and Burnt Friedman (7" vinyl, 2015)
- Véronique Vincent & Aksak Maboul: 16 Visions of Ex-Futur, with Flavien Berger, Aquaserge, Forever Pavot, Laetitia Sadier, Jaakko Eino Kalevi etc (album [CD, LP and digital numérique], 2016)
- Aksak Maboul: Figures (album [CD, LP and digital], 2020)
- Aksak Maboul: Redrawn Figures (two albums of cover versions and remixes (vinyl and digital], 2021)
- Aksak Maboul: Une aventure de VV (songspiel) (album [CD, vinyl an digital], 2023)

=== Collaborations ===
- Zazou/Bikaye/CY1: Noir et Blanc (album, 1983)
- Freezone 2 (album, 1995)
- Aksak Maboul: Un peu de l'âme des bandits (album, CD reissue 1996)
- Tek 9: It's Not What You Think It Is!!?! (album, 1997)
- Think Of One: Camping Shaâbi (album, 2007)
- Laetitia Sadier: Don't Forget You're Mine (lyrics by Véronique Vincent - Drag City, 2024)
