= In the 7th Moon, the Chief Turned Into a Swimming Fish and Ate the Head of His Enemy by Magic =

Studio album by Kasai Allstars
- Released: 15 July 2008
- Genre: Traditional African folk/fusion
- Label: Crammed Discs

Kasai Allstars chronology
In the 7th Moon, the Chief Turned Into a Swimming Fish and Ate the Head of His Enemy by Magic (2008)	Beware the Fetish (2014)

In the 7th Moon, the Chief Turned Into a Swimming Fish and Ate the Head of His Enemy by Magic is the first album by Congolese musical collective Kasai Allstars.

== Track listing ==
No.	Title	Length
1.	"Quick As White"	7:07
2.	"Mukuba"	8:12
3.	"Kafuulu Balu"	6:08
4.	"Beyond The 7th Moon"	5:29
5.	"Mbua-A-Matumba"	10:46
6.	"Mpombo Yetu"	8:02
7.	"Tshitua Fuila Mbuloba"	5:13
8.	"Analengo"	8:18
9.	"Drowning Goat (Mbuji-Mayi)"	10:45

== Reception ==
Professional ratings
Aggregate scores
Source	Rating
Metacritic	83/100
Review scores
Source	Rating
AllMusic	4.5/5 stars
The A.V. Club	A−
The Boston Phoenix	4/4 stars
The Guardian	4/5 stars
Mojo	4/5 stars
MSN Music (Consumer Guide)	B+
Pitchfork	7.8/10
PopMatters	6/10
Rolling Stone	3.5/5 stars
Uncut	4/5 stars

The album was well received by critics: according to Metacritic, the album has received an average review score of 83/100, based on 16 reviews.
