= Congotronics =

Studio album by Konono Nº1
- Released: 2004
- Length: 50:58
- Labels: Crammed Discs; Ache Records (vinyl)

Congotronics is the official debut album by Konono Nº1. It was released in 2004. by Crammed Discs. It has won the band massive favour in the dance and alternative rock scenes as well as in world music circles and in the North American and European media.

Konono Nº1's Congotronics was also released on vinyl by Canadian label Ache Records, who issued three vinyl pressings of the album: the first included 546 on black and 548 on dark green; the next two were each 1,000 copies on black vinyl.

Congotronics will now also be released on vinyl as part of Crammed Discs Congotronics Vinyl Box Set, a limited-edition box containing 5 albums from the Congotronics Series as well as assorted bonuses.

== Reception ==
Professional ratings
Aggregate scores
Source	Rating
Metacritic	87/100
Review scores
Source	Rating
AllMusic	4.5/5 stars
Christgau’s Consumer Guide	(2-star Honorable Mention)
The Guardian	4/5 stars
Mojo	4/5 stars
Pitchfork	7.9/10
PopMatters	8/10
Stylus	B+
Tiny Mix Tapes	4/5 stars
Tom Hull	A−

Initial critical response to Congotronics was positive. At Metacritic, which assigns a normalized rating out of 100 to reviews from mainstream critics, the album has received an average score of 87, based on 11 reviews.

The album placed 31st in webzine Pitchfork Media's staff list, "Top 50 Albums of 2005," and in August 2009, "Paradiso" was named the 386th track in their staff list, "The Top 500 Tracks of the 2000s".

== Track listing ==
No.	Title	Length
1.	"Lufuala Ndonga"	9:27
2.	"Masikulu"	8:01
3.	"Kule Kule"	4:33
4.	"Ungudi Wele Wele"	8:27
5.	"Paradiso"	7:04
6.	"Kule Kule Reprise"	3:04
7.	"Mama Liza"	10:22

== Congotronics series ==
Konono Nº1's Congotronics was the first volume in the eponymously titled, ongoing Congotronics series of albums devoted to electrified traditional music from the Congo, curated and produced by Vincent Kenis for the Crammed Discs label. Volume 2 of the Congotronics Series is the multi-artist Buzz'n'Rumble In The Urb'n'Jungle album (released on CD and video), volume 3 is In The 7th Moon, The Chief Turned Into A Swimming Fish And Ate The Head Of His Enemy By Magic by the Kasai Allstars collective, and Konono Nº1's 2010 album Assume Crash Position.

To date, the Congotronics series has featured music by bands such as Kasai Allstars, Sobanza Mimanisa, Kisanzi Congo, Masanka Sankayi and Basokin. These bands play what is referred to in the Congo as tradi-moderne music, and comprises musicians who left the bush in order to settle in Kinshasa, the capital of the Democratic Republic Of The Congo.

In order to continue to play at weddings, funerals and social gatherings despite urban noise, they had to resort to a makeshift electrification of their instruments, which produced a sound similar to that of some forms of avant-rock or electronica.

=== Bands featured ===
- Konono N°1 is the band which first introduced electrified traditional Congolese music to broader audiences in North America and Europe. The band was founded in the 1960s by Mingiedi Mawangu, a virtuoso of the likembé (a traditional instrument sometimes called "sanza", kalimba, mbira or "thumb piano", consisting of metal rods attached to a resonator). The band's line-up includes three electric likembés (bass, medium and treble), equipped with hand-made microphones built from magnets salvaged from old car parts, and plugged into amplifiers.
- Kasai Allstars: A province the size of France situated in the center of Congo, Kasai is well known for its diamond fields and vivid musical traditions. This collective of artists incorporates members from four different Kasaian bands, including Basokin and Masanka Sankayi, and personalities as diverse as singer Muambuyi (from West Kasai), and singer/dancer/slit drum player Tandjolo (from the Tetela region, which links Kasai to the Equator province).
- Masanka Sankayi: dancers, singers and story-tellers Muyamba Nyunyi and Kabongo from East Kasai have been together since the 1970s. Muyamba the preacher is also an excellent bass likembe player. Unlike Konono's, his instrument is a 20" square box featuring half a likembe on each side and on which he sits in a foetus-like position.
- Sobanza Mimanisa (orchestra of light) are the resident band in Nganda Boboto, in the Selembao district. They perform with a limited range of instruments: a bell, a whistle, makeshift percussion, a guitar - whose 'power chord' style is very unusual in Kinshasa - and a likembe playing the bass and solo parts at the same time. Sobanza Mimanisa comes from the Bacongo province.
- Kisanzi Congo's line-up is similar to Konono's, and they also come from the Bacongo province (specifically the Mbeko region). But whereas Konono's electric likembes use raw power to carry their message, Kisanzi Congo rely more on virtuosity and adopt a freer form.
- Basokin (the Basongye from Kinshasa) are from the Songye region, at the Eastern fringe of Kasai. Their frontman Mputu Ebondo 'Mi Amor' is a well-known spokesman for the Songye and Kasaian community.
- Bolia We Ndenge come from the Lake Mai Ndombe. They're remarkable by their central use of the accordion, an instrument which had become very popular in Congo until it was supplanted by the guitar in the '50s.

=== Releases ===
- Congotronics 1 by Konono N°1 (2004)
- Congotronics 2 - Buzz'n'Rumble In The Urb'n'Jungle, a multi-artist album comprising a CD and a DVD, and featuring original material by Konono N°1, Basokin, Masanka Sankayi, Kasai Allstars, Bolia We Ndenge, Sobanza Mimanisa, Kisanzi Congo and Tulu (2005)
- Live At Couleur Café by Konono N°1 (2007; this album was nominated for a Grammy Award)
- In The 7th Moon, The Chief Turned Into A Swimming Fish And Ate The Head Of His Enemy By Magic by Kasai Allstars(2008)
- Assume Crash Position by Konono N°1 (2010)
- The album Très Très Fort by Staff Benda Bilili is considered as closely related but not strictly part of the Congotronics series.
- The Congotronics Vinyl Box Set (2010): in April 2010, Crammed Discs have released a limited edition box set, containing vinyl versions of all the albums listed above (except Konono N°1's Live At Couleur Café, but including the Staff Benda Bilili album and Konono N°1's Assume Crash Position), plus assorted bonuses including a 7" single featuring a collaboration between Kasai Allstars and US indie-folk-rock band Akron/Family, as well as videos and mp3s.
- Congotronics 5 - Beware the Fetish by Kasai Allstars (2014)
