= Chris Joris =

Belgian percussionist, pianist and composer

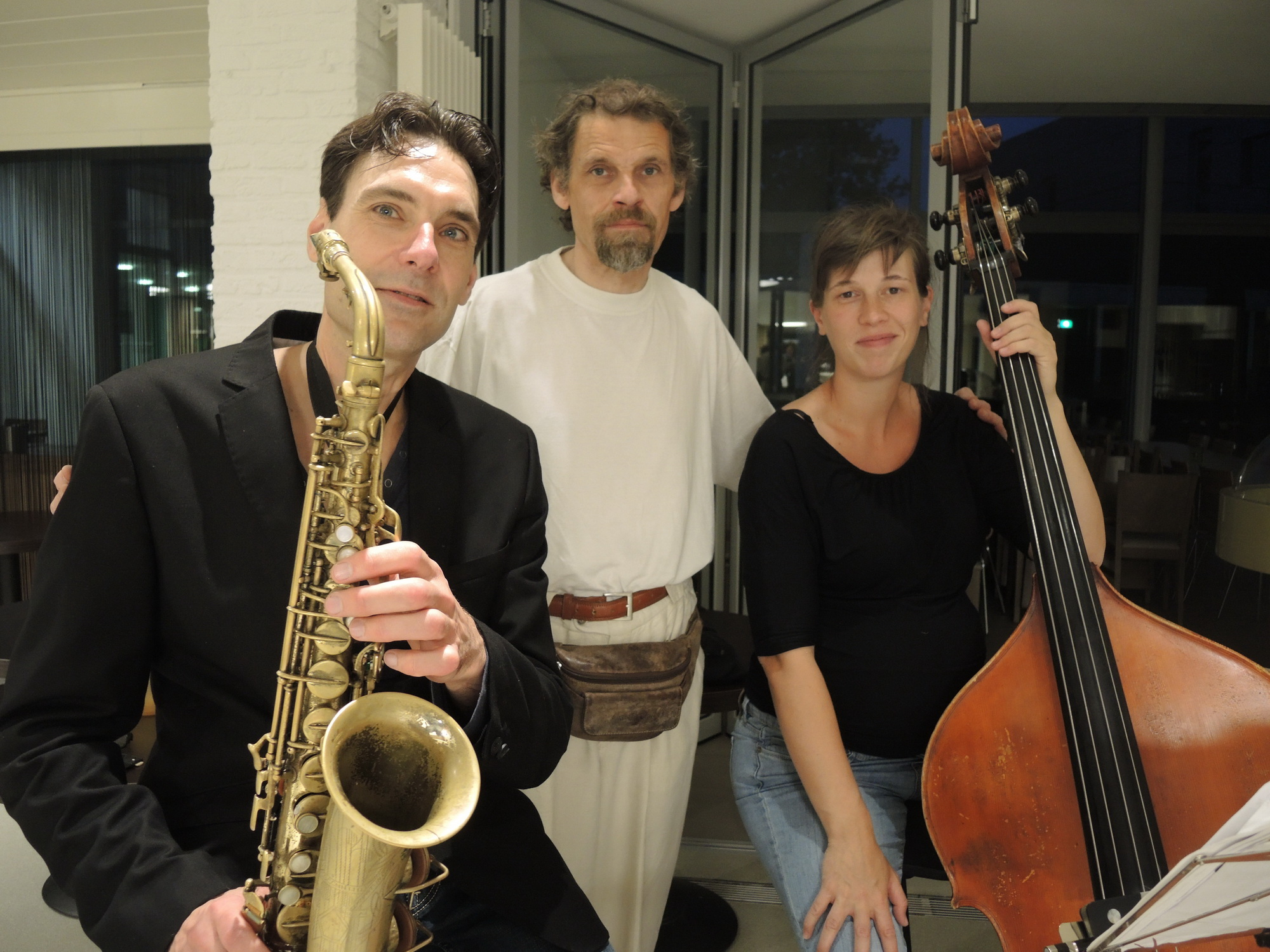
Chris Joris in the middle

Chris Joris (born 30 November 1952, Mechelen) is a Belgian jazz percussionist, pianist and composer. He is the son of Jan Joris, an opera singer. Joris joined Aksak Maboul in 1977, appeared on their first album but left the group later that year. In the mid-1990s, he formed The Chris Joris Experience, a jazz band with Sam Versweyveld (trumpet), Bart Defoort (saxophone), Ernst Vranckx (piano) and Chris Mentens (acoustic bass). He won the 1998 Belgian Golden Django for best Flemish artist.

== Recordings ==
In October 2007 Joris released Rainbow Country on the Belgium De Werf label. The CD features: Bob Stewart: tuba, compo's Eric Person: alto- et soprano sax, flute, compo's Baba Sissoko: tama, tamani, ngoni, vocals, compo's Fabian Fiorini: piano Reggie Washington: electric bass, compo Chris Mentens: double bass Junior Mthombeni: congas, udu, percussion, voice Chris Joris: timba, cymbals, djembé, congas, steeldrum, likembé, small percussion, compo's, leader
