= Jaakko Eino Kalevi =

Finnish musician (born 1984)

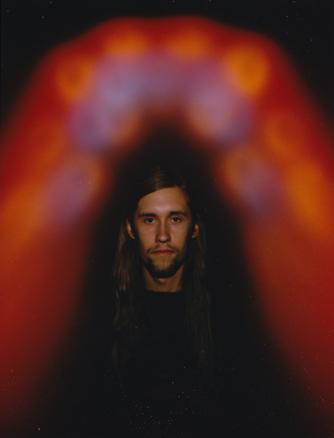
- Jaakko Eino Kalevi

Background information
- Born: 9 August 1984 (age 40)
- Years active: 2007–present
- Labels: Weird World
- Website: weirdworldrecordco.com/jek/

Jaakko Eino Kalevi (born 1984) is a Finnish musician.

Kalevi grew up in Jyväskylä. He started to release music in 2007. Kalevi used to work as a tram driver in Helsinki, Finland.

In 2015, he released Jaakko Eino Kalevi on Weird World. The album was shortlisted for the sixth Nordic Music Prize.

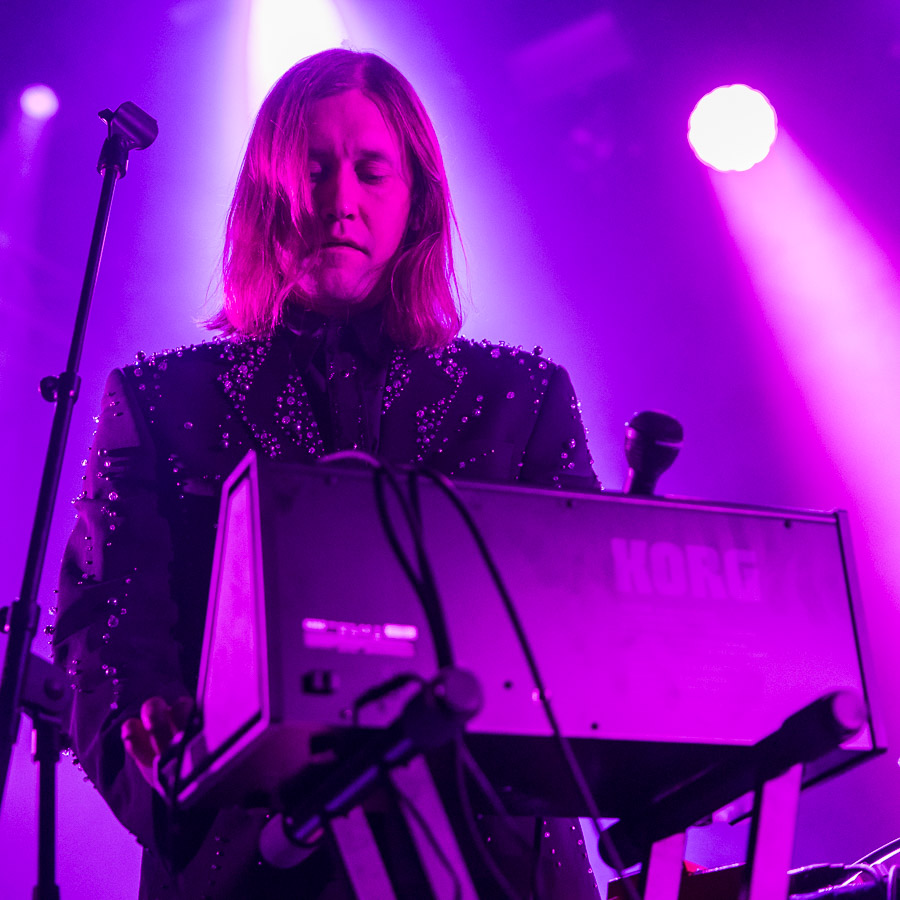
Jaakko Eino Kalevi in 2023 performing at Parkteatret in Oslo

.

== Studio albums ==
- Modern Life (2010)
- Jaakko Eino Kalevi (2015)
- Out of Touch (2018)
- Chaos Magic (2023)
