= Vincent Kenis =

Belgian musician and record producer

Vincent Kenis is a Belgian musician and record producer. He was a member of the avant-garde group Aksak Maboul (Onze Danses Pour Combattre la Migraine, 1977) and of The Honeymoon Killers, an experimental rock band (Les Tueurs de la Lune de Miel, 1982). As a musician, he also collaborated with Congolese artists such as OK Jazz's Franco Luambo Makiadi (La Réponse de Mario, 1988) and Papa Wemba (La Vie est belle, 1989).

Closely associated with Belgian label Crammed Discs since its inception, both as an in-house producer and an A&R, he co-produced the seminal Noir et Blanc album by Zazou Bikaye (with Hector Zazou and Bony Bikaye, 1983), one of the first albums which blended electronic and African music. He produced the first album by a cappella band Zap Mama, and several albums by Balkan Gypsy bands Taraf de Haïdouks and Kocani Orkestar, while also being involved in the sonic design of many Crammed releases, including albums by Tuxedomoon, Cibelle, Zuco 103, as well as the label's purely electronic output during the 1990s (such as the Freezone compilations). He has compiled an anthology of early Congolese rumba (Roots of Rumba-Rock, 1991, re-issued in 2006).

Since 2004, Vincent Kenis has developed the Congotronics series (on Crammed Discs), which popularized electro-traditional music from the suburbs of Kinshasa (Democratic Republic of Congo). He "re-discovered" Konono N°1, whom he encouraged to reform and record again. The resulting albums (Congotronics, 2005, Live at Couleur Café, 2007 and Assume Crash Position, 2010) have earned the band worldwide recognition, as well as a BBC World Music Award (2006) and a nomination for a Grammy Award (2008).

Vincent Kenis' recent productions include an album by Malian Tuareg band Tartit (Abacabok, 2006), the multi-artist Congotronics 2 CD/DVD, featuring other Congotronics-style bands such as Kisanzi Kongo, Masanka Sankayi, Basokin, Konono N°1 and Kasai Allstars (Congotronics 2, 2006), the debut album by Kasai Allstars (In The 7th Moon, The Chief Turned into A Swimming Fish And Ate The Head of His Enemy By Magic, 2008), Très Très Fort (2009) and Bouger le monde (2012), the two albums by Kinshasa band Staff Benda Bilili, The Karindula Sessions (a DVD+CD documenting the music of 4 bands from south-eastern Congo), the latest albums by Kasai Allstars, Beware The Fetish (2014) and Around Félicité (2017), by Taraf de Haidouks, Of Lovers, Gamblers and Parachute Skirts (2015), and by Konono N°1, Konono N°1 Meets Batida (2016).
