= Kasai Allstars =

Congolese musical group

Kasai Allstars are a 25-piece musical collective based in Kinshasa, Democratic Republic of the Congo. The musicians are from the Kasaï region, originating from five different ethnic groups: the Songye, Lulua, Tetela, Luba, and Luntu. The collective includes members active in bands, including Masanka Sankayi and Basokin.

Some of these groups have endured conflicting relationships over the centuries, and they each have their own culture, their own language, and their own musical traditions. These were always thought to be incompatible until the musicians decided to pool their resources and form a collective.

Their records were produced, recorded & mixed by Vincent Kenis, a Belgian producer with interest in Congolese music.

== Career ==
In 2008, Kasai Allstars released an album on Crammed Discs entitled In the 7th Moon, the Chief Turned Into a Swimming Fish and Ate the Head of His Enemy by Magic. It was the third release in the label's Congotronics series. The album was well received by Western music critics.

In 2010, Crammed Discs released Tradi-Mods vs. Rockers: Alternative Takes on Congotronics, a multi-artist album containing interpretations, covers and tributes to the music of Kasai Allstars, Konono Nº1 and other Congotronics bands, recorded by 26 indie rock and electronic musicians, including Deerhoof, Animal Collective, Andrew Bird, Juana Molina, Shackleton, Megafaun, and Aksak Maboul. The following year, Kasai Allstars took part in the Congotronics vs. Rockers project, a "superband" of ten Congolese and ten indie rock musicians (including members of Deerhoof, Wildbirds & Peacedrums, Konono No.1, Skeletons, and Juana Molina), who collaborated to create a common repertoire and performed at 15 major festivals and venues in ten countries.

Kasai Allstars' second full-length album, Beware the Fetish, was released in 2014. The album was well welcomed by the press. In 2017, Kasai Allstars appeared in Alain Gomis' film Félicité, for which they wrote and recorded most of the soundtrack music. The soundtrack album was entitled Around Félicité. The album Black Ants Always Fly Together, One Bangle Makes No Sound was released in May 2021.

== Band line-up ==
(as it appears on the album In The 7th Moon...):

- Mputu Ebondo 'Mi Amor': lead vocals
- Muambuyi: lead vocals, dancer
- Mbuyamba Nyunyi: lead vocals, bass likembe
- Kabongo Tshisensa: lead vocals, likembe, bass likembe
- Tandjolo: lokole (slit drum), lead vocals
- Tshilumba Muamba 'Baila' and Didi Bafuafua: xylophones
- Tshimanga Muamba: resonator drum
- Kalenga Ditu: likembe (thumb piano)
- Mopero and Niawu: electric guitars
- Kabese Ngandu 'Bondis': vocals, percussion
- Ngalula Ndaye Sylvie, Bosio Tokala Mamie, Yempongo Kadiya,
- Tete Mutungilayi and Kanku Nshinga Wa Buanda: vocals and dancing
- Mpanya Mutombo: lead vocals
- Gaby Nsapo Kilolo: guitar and vocals

== Discography ==
- In the 7th Moon, the Chief Turned Into a Swimming Fish and Ate the Head of His Enemy by Magic (2008, Crammed Discs)
- The Congotronics Vinyl Box Set (2010).
- Beware the Fetish (2014, Crammed Discs)
- Around Félicité (2017, Crammed Discs)
- Black Ants Always Fly Together, One Bangle Makes No Sound (2021, Crammed Discs)

Compilation appearances

- Congotronics 2: multi-artist album, including tracks and videos by Kasai Allstars, by its sub-groups Basokin and Masanka Sankayi, by Konono N°1, Bolia We Ndenge, Sobanza Mimanisa, Kisanzi Congo and Tulu. (2005, Crammed Discs).
- Tshileja: original track included in the compilation 20 Ways To Float Through Walls (2007, Crammed Discs).
- Tradi-Mods Vs. Rockers: Alternative Takes on Congotronics (2010, Crammed Discs), a double CD featuring reworks and reinterpretations of the music of Kasai Allstars, Konono No 1 and other Congolese bands, made by 24 indie rock and electronic musicians from Europe, Japan and the Americas.
