= The Honeymoon Killers (Belgian band) =

Belgian experimental rock band

Background information
- Origin: Brussels, Belgium
- Genre: Experimental rock
- Years active: 1974–1985
- Label: Crammed Discs
- Past members: Yvon Vromman; J.F Jones Jacob; Gérald Fenerberg; Liza 'N' Eliaz; Véronique Vincent; Vincent Kenis; Marc Hollander

The Honeymoon Killers were a Belgian experimental rock band originally formed in 1974 by Yvon Vromman, with J.F Jones Jacob, and Gérald Fenerberg. In its first incarnation, the band played mostly in Brussels, was arrogant and funny, and performed massacres on all musical genres, from rockabilly and punk to marching band music, French chanson and free jazz.

The band's original name at the time was Les Tueurs de la lune de miel (i.e. "The Honeymoon Killers" in French). Their first album, entitled Special Manubre, was produced by Marc Moulin for his short-lived Kamikaze imprint, and came out in 1977.

In 1980 the Tueurs were joined by Vincent Kenis and Marc Hollander from Aksak Maboul and completed their line-up with singer Véronique Vincent.

1981 saw the group touring through Europe. Their cover of Charles Trenet's "Route Nationale 7" quickly became a radio & TV hit single in France and Belgium. The band's second album (entitled Les Tueurs de la Lune de Miel — the French title of the album being the band’s English name, and vice versa) was warmly welcomed in Germany, France, and the UK where, unusually for a band which didn't sing in English, they received excellent coverage in the press, including the NME, on the cover of which the band appeared in 1982. Another member during the 1980s was transgender hardcore pioneer Liza 'N' Eliaz.

Live on stage, The Honeymoon Killers often used pre-recorded drum machine loops which were played from cassette, over this they put guitar, bass, drums, trashy percussion, cheap-sounding organ, with Vromman and Vincent taking turns on singing. Some of their songs were extended to 20 minutes with their own brand of dub echo effects.

The group split in 1985. Yvon Vromman died in 1989.

Their album Les Tueurs De La Lune De Miel was rated "best Belgian rock album of all times" by Belgian rock magazine Mofo, and numbered among the top ten Belgian albums of all times according to Le Vif/L'Express magazine (2008).

In July 2012, UK newspaper The Guardian published an article entitled "The History of Belgian Pop in 10 Songs", which featured The Honeymoon Killers' Décollage, and described the group as "a band whose combination of indie pop, jazz and African influences echoed the pioneering spirit of Talking Heads without ever lapsing into imitation".

In the Fall of 2014, former Honeymoon Killers members Véronique Vincent and Marc Hollander completed and released the album entitled Ex-Futur Album under the artist name Véronique Vincent & Aksak Maboul with The Honeymoon Killers. The album had been recorded in the early 1980s with Vincent Kenis and with contributions by the rest of the band.

The album Les Tueurs de la Lune de Miel was reissued on vinyl in 2016.

Véronique Vincent died on 5 October 2025, at the age of 68.

== Discography ==
- Spécial Manubre (vinyl LP, Kamikaze, 1977 - reissued in 2009 on CD by Crammed Discs).
- Route Nationale 7/Histoire à Suivre (7" single, Crammed Discs, 1981)
- Les Tueurs de la Lune de Miel (vinyl LP, Crammed Discs, 1982, reissued in 2016)
- Les Tueurs de la Lune de Miel - CD edition containing 8 bonus tracks (Crammed Discs, 2003)
- Décollage (7" single, Crammed Discs, 1982)
- Subtitled Remix (12" vinyl EP, Crammed Discs, 1983 - included in the CD reissue of the 2nd album)
