= Volume 7 (Violeta de Outono album) =

Studio album by Violeta de Outono
- Released: July 7, 2007
- Recorded: April 11–12, 2007
- Genres: Progressive rock, psychedelic rock
- Label: Voiceprint Records
- Producers: Fabio Golfetti, Violeta de Outono

Violeta de Outono chronology
Violeta de Outono & Orquestra (2006)	Volume 7 (2007)	Seventh Brings Return: A Tribute to Syd Barrett (2009)

Volume 7 is the fifth studio album by Brazilian psychedelic rock band Violeta de Outono, although it's their seventh studio release if the extended plays Reflexos da Noite and The Early Years are counted (hence the album's name). It was released on July 7, 2007 by Voiceprint Records, being the first album of the band to not feature founding member Angelo Pastorello, who was replaced by Gabriel Costa. It was also their first release with keyboardist Fernando Cardoso.

== Track listing ==
No.	Title	Length
1.	"Além do Sol" (Beyond the Sun)	5:22
2.	"Caravana" (Caravan)	4:36
3.	"Broken Legs"	3:10
4.	"Eyes Like Butterflies"	6:04
5.	"Em Cada Instante" (In Every Instant)	5:14
6.	"Pequenos Seres Errantes" (Little Wandering Beings)	7:51
7.	"Ponto de Transição" (Transition Point)	3:53
8.	"Fronteira" (Frontier)	10:19

== Personnel ==
- Fabio Golfetti – vocals, guitar
- Cláudio Souza – drums
- Gabriel Costa – bass
- Fernando Cardoso – keyboards
- Walter Lima – mastering
- Flávio Tsutsumi – photography
