= Ao Vivo no Theatro Municipal =

Video by Violeta de Outono
- Released: July 25, 2011
- Recorded: May 3, 2009
- Genres: Progressive rock, psychedelic rock
- Label: Voiceprint Records
- Producer: Fabio Golfetti

Violeta de Outono chronology
Seventh Brings Return: A Tribute to Syd Barrett (2009)	Ao Vivo no Theatro Municipal (2011)	Espectro (2012)

Violeta de Outono – Ao Vivo no Theatro Municipal, São Paulo, 03.05.2009 is a live video by Brazilian psychedelic rock band Violeta de Outono, released by Voiceprint Records on July 25, 2011. As the name implies, it was recorded during a show at the Theatro Municipal in São Paulo on May 3, 2009, in which they performed their 1987 debut album in its entirety, as well as some other tracks.

This was one of the last performances of drummer Cláudio Souza in the band.

== Tracks ==
1. "Introdução"
2. "Outono"
3. "Trópico"
4. "Reflexos da Noite"
5. "Declínio de Maio"
6. "Faces"
7. "Luz"
8. "Retorno"
9. "Dia Eterno"
10. "Noturno Deserto"
11. "Sombras Flutuantes"
12. "Tomorrow Never Knows"
13. "Em Toda Parte"
14. "Vênus"

== Personnel ==
- Fabio Golfetti – vocals, guitar
- Cláudio Souza – drums
- Gabriel Costa – bass
- Fernando Cardoso – keyboards
