= Heroina (band) =

Yugoslav rock band

- Origin: Novi Sad, SR Serbia, SFR Yugoslavia
- Genres: Art pop; synth-funk
- Years active: 1982–1986
- Labels: PGP-RTB
- Past members: Zoran Janjetov; Nebojša Živaljević; Đorđe Stanković; Novica Pavlović; Stevan Dostan; Dejan Isakov

Heroina (Serbian Cyrillic: Хероина; "Heroine") was a Yugoslav rock band formed in Novi Sad in 1982. The group was a prominent act of the mid-1980s Yugoslav rock scene.

== History ==
=== 1982–1986 ===
Heroina was formed in 1982 by Nebojša Živaljević (guitar), Đorđe Stanković (rhythm guitar) and Novica Pavlović (bass guitar). The three had been performing together since 1978 under the name ŠV 20 (chosen after a form signed by students at Yugoslav universities), with some of their demo recordings broadcast on Radio Novi Sad. With the expansion of new wave in Yugoslavia, they decided to change their musical direction and move towards more new wave-oriented sound.

In 1983, they were joined by Stevan Dostan (drums), Dejan Isakov (keyboards) and Zoran Janjetov (vocals), who was at the time a well-known comic book artist. The band performed across Yugoslavia. At their performances in Zagreb clubs Lapidarij, Kulušić and SKUC, Laboratorija Zvuka saxophonist Deže Molnar performed with them. The demo version of the song "Momo" achieved certain success on Yugoslav radio stations.

During the recording of the band's debut album Pavlović and Dostan left the band, so the album was recorded with rhythm machine, which was programmed by Karlowy Vary member Tomo in der Mühlen, and with bass guitarist Aleksandar "Caki" Kravić. The band was persuaded to use rhythm machine instead of drums by the album producer, Mitar Subotić. The album featured Deže Molnar on saxophone and Hungarian jazz musician Rudolf Tomsits on trumpet. The record, entitled simply Heroina and featuring artwork designed by Janjetov (he created the painting on the cover in only two hours), was released through PGP-RTB in 1985. The album presented the band's version of art rock, and although the members of the band were not entirely satisfied with the results of the recordings, the album was well received by the audience. The band continued to perform, changing several rhythm sections, ending their activity in 1986.

=== Post breakup ===
Janjetov continued his career as a comic book artist, achieving large success on the French comics scene. In 1986, he was chosen by Moebius to continue his work on The Incal. He illustrated Avant l'Incal and The Technopriests, written by Alejandro Jodorowsky. He designed artwork for a number of Yugoslav acts, including Oktobar 1864, Viktorija, Angel's Breath, but also for international world music acts, like Zuco 103, Konono Nº1, Bebel Gilberto, Celso Fonseca, Tartit, Taraf de Haïdouks, Mahala Raï Banda, Kasai Allstars, Kočani Orkestar and other acts.

Dejan Isakov died in 2000.

== Discography ==
=== Studio albums ===
- Heroina (1985)
