= Mulher na Montanha =

Studio album by Violeta de Outono
- Released: September 27, 1999
- Recorded: 1994–1999
- Genre: Progressive rock, psychedelic rock
- Label: Voiceprint Records
- Producer: Violeta de Outono

Violeta de Outono chronology
Eclipse (1995)	Mulher na Montanha (1999)	Live at Rio ArtRock Festival '97 (2000)

Mulher na Montanha (Portuguese for "Woman on the Mountain") is the third studio album by Brazilian psychedelic rock band Violeta de Outono.

== Background ==
Following 1989's Em Toda Parte, Violeta de Outono went on hiatus and each member began working on their own separate projects. The group reunited in 1994 and recorded a brand-new demotape with new material for the first time in 5 years, containing a substantially different track listing from the final album, and distributed it among fans in São Paulo.

Proper recording sessions for the album took place between April and June 1995, and the result was a cassette tape released under Fabio Golfetti's own label, Invisível, titled Rumo Leste. Later that same year, the band decided to re-record some of the songs from that album to be released as a single. Various songs were rehearsed during these sessions (including a joint cover of the songs "Echoes" and "No Quarter", which was later included as a bonus track on the 1999 reissue of the EP The Early Years), with additional contributions from musician Fabio Ribeiro, resulting in three new recordings: '"Mulher na Montanha", "Outro Lado" and "Lírio de Vidro". This single, however, remained unreleased at the time due to lack of interest from larger labels.

These tracks and the re-recorded versions would not be widely released until September 27, 1999 by Voiceprint Records, being their first of many albums to be so. It was also their first studio album with new material since Em Toda Parte.

The track "Terra Distante" previously appeared in Em Toda Parte, and was re-recorded for this release. In addition, according to Fabio Golfetti, the lyrics to "Sonho" were based on a poem by Chinese poet Li Bai.

Voiceprint re-issued Mulher na Montanha in 2003, containing three bonus tracks – remastered versions of two tracks which previously appeared in their 1986 EP Reflexos da Noite and a cover of Pink Floyd's "Astronomy Domine", previously featured on Rumo Leste.

== Track listing ==
No.	Title	Length
1.	"Mulher na Montanha" (Woman on the Mountain)	4:05
2.	"Lírio de Vidro" (Glass Lily)	2:56
3.	"Outro Lado" (Other Side)	3:09
4.	"Total Silêncio" (Complete Silence)	2:35
5.	"Lágrimas do Dragão" (Tears of the Dragon – instrumental)	4:59
6.	"Creme Gelado, Desculpe" (Ice Cream, Sorry)	4:36
7.	"Espelhos Planos" (Plain Mirrors)	3:21
8.	"Duna" (Dune)	6:24
9.	"Flutuando" (Floating)	3:25
10.	"Sonho" (Dream)	3:49
11.	"Terra Distante" (Distant Land)	3:17
12.	"Ilusão" (Illusion)	3:10

2003 re-issue bonus tracks
No.	Title	Length
13.	"Trópico" (Recorded in 1986)	4:13
14.	"Reflexos da Noite" (Recorded in 1986)	6:43
15.	"Astronomy Domine" (Pink Floyd cover)	3:55

== Personnel ==
- Fabio Golfetti – vocals, guitar
- Cláudio Souza – drums
- Angelo Pastorello – bass
