= Seventh Brings Return: A Tribute to Syd Barrett =

Video by Violeta de Outono
- Released: January 2009
- Recorded: July 17, 2006
- Genre: Progressive rock, psychedelic rock
- Label: Voiceprint Records
- Producer: Sandro Garcia

Violeta de Outono chronology
Volume 7 (2007)	Seventh Brings Return: A Tribute to Syd Barrett (2009)	Ao Vivo no Theatro Municipal (2011)

Seventh Brings Return: A Tribute to Syd Barrett is a live video by Brazilian psychedelic rock band Violeta de Outono, released by Voiceprint Records in 2009. It was recorded during a show at the Teatro Popular do SESI on July 17, 2006, in which they covered numerous Pink Floyd songs as a tribute to Pink Floyd's former lead vocalist and founding member Syd Barrett, as well as a song of his 1970 solo album The Madcap Laughs.

It was given a rating of four stars by Record Collector.

== Tracks ==
1. "Astronomy Domine"
2. "Arnold Layne"
3. "See Emily Play"
4. "Lucifer Sam"
5. "Matilda Mother"
6. "Flaming"
7. "Interstellar Overdrive"
8. "The Gnome"
9. "Chapter 24"
10. "The Scarecrow"
11. "Bike"
12. "Jugband Blues"
13. "No Good Trying"
14. "Set the Controls for the Heart of the Sun" (bonus track; recorded live at the Café Piu-Piu in São Paulo, on January 19, 2006)

== Personnel ==
- Fabio Golfetti – vocals, guitar
- Cláudio Souza – drums
- Gabriel Costa – bass
- Fernando Cardoso – keyboards
