= Spaces (Violeta de Outono album) =

Studio album by Violeta de Outono
- Released: October 14, 2016
- Recorded: Autumn 2016
- Genre: Progressive rock, psychedelic rock
- Label: Voiceprint Records
- Producer: Fabio Golfetti

Violeta de Outono chronology
Live at Rio ArtRock Festival '97 (2015)	Spaces (2016)

Spaces is the seventh studio album by Brazilian psychedelic rock band Violeta de Outono, released on October 14, 2016, through Voiceprint Records. The band began work on the album circa June 2016, but it wouldn't be officially announced until September 19, 2016, when they uploaded a short teaser on their official YouTube channel; later on, a lyric video for the track "A Painter of the Mind" was uploaded on October 5, 2016. The album is an homage of sorts to Swiss-German artist Paul Klee (1879–1940); it uses a sketch made by him as its cover art, and the lyrics to "A Painter of the Mind" consist of many excerpts of some of his poems.

The album also counts with a guest appearance by musician Fernando Alge, who wrote the track "Flowers on the Moon", and was mastered by Andy Jackson, who previously frequently collaborated with Pink Floyd.

== Track listing ==
All lyrics are written by Fabio Golfetti, except for "A Painter of the Mind" by Paul Klee and "Flowers on the Moon" by Fernando Alge.

No.	Title	Length
1.	"Imagens" (Images)	12:01
2.	"Kevinland"	3:03
3.	"Parallax T-Blues" (instrumental)	6:18
4.	"Imagens (Reprise)" (instrumental)	0:33
5.	"Flowers on the Moon" (feat. Fernando Alge)	4:53
6.	"A Painter of the Mind"	4:57
7.	"Cidade Extinta" (Extinct City)	10:51

== Personnel ==
- Fabio Golfetti – vocals, guitar, production
- José Luiz Dinola – drums
- Gabriel Costa – bass
- Fernando Cardoso – keyboards
- Fernando Alge – guitar, backing vocals (on track 5)
- Alex Angeloni – mixing, engineering
- Andy Jackson – mastering
- Invisível – cover art (on a sketch by Paul Klee)
