= Mitar Subotić =

Serbian musician and composer (1961–1999)

- Subotić in 1985

Background information
- Also known as: Rex Ilusivii, Suba
- Born: 23 June 1961; Novi Sad, PR Serbia, FPR Yugoslavia
- Died: 2 November 1999 (aged 38) São Paulo, São Paulo, Brazil
- Genres: Experimental rock, ambient music, minimal music, electronic music, latin rock, bossa nova
- Occupations: Producer, musician
- Instruments: Keyboards, piano, synthesizer
- Years active: 1982 – 1999
- Labels: PGP RTB, "M" Produkcija Radio Novog Sada, Ziriguiboom, SSR Records, Six Degrees Records

Mitar Subotić "Suba" (Serbian Cyrillic: Митар Суботић Суба; 23 June 1961 – 2 November 1999), also known as Rex Ilusivii (Latin for The King of Illusions), was a Serbian-born musician and composer who was set to become one of Brazil's most prominent producers when he died in November 1999.

Subotić obtained a university degree in his hometown from the University of Novi Sad, Serbia, before continuing electronic music studies in Belgrade. He was a pioneer of electronic music in former Yugoslavia, since he mixed and produced a number of celebrated albums of Yugoslav new wave acts such as Ekatarina Velika, Haustor, Marina Perazić in the course of the 1980s. In 1986, his fusion of electronic music and Yugoslav folk lullabies, In The Mooncage was awarded the International Fund for Promotion of Culture from UNESCO, which included a three-month scholarship to research Afro-Brazilian rhythms in Brazil. Falling in love with the country and its music, he emigrated to São Paulo in the 1990s, where his fruitful production began and ended. During that time he participated in Milan Mladenović's last project Angel's Breath, and recorded his famous album São Paulo Confessions.

On 2 November 1999 he was working on the post-production of the album of his new-found diva, Bebel Gilberto, when his studio caught fire. Following Subotić's death in a studio fire, international media outlets heavily popularized a narrative claiming he initially escaped the burning building but died after running back inside to salvage the unreleased master tapes of singer Bebel Gilberto's upcoming album, Tanto Tempo. However, this account has been disputed by Subotić's estate, close friends, and collaborators. According to records from his record label, Crammed Discs, the master tapes for Gilberto's album had already been finalized and safely delivered prior to the tragedy, meaning no such files were left in the studio to rescue. Furthermore, the biographical documentary Gringo Paulista, produced in cooperation with the official Mitar Subotić Suba Foundation, established through chronological eyewitness testimonies that Subotić never successfully made an initial exit from the apartment, instead tragically succumbing directly to smoke inhalation inside the studio. According to public events around the film and director's testimonies, Gilberto herself has expressed distress over the persistence of the "heroic rescue" myth, noting that the narrative unfairly shifted a heavy burden of survival guilt onto her for a fabricated event.

Suba died just a few days after the release of his album São Paulo Confessions, and shortly before the completion of Bebel Gilberto's acclaimed Tanto Tempo, the biggest selling Brazilian album outside Brazil.

== Biography ==
=== Early years (1961–1982) ===
Mitar Subotić "Suba" was born on 23 June 1961 in Novi Sad, where he attended the music elementary school, playing accordion and achieving notable success with his accordion school orchestra in Yugoslavia and abroad. He started his career as a rock musician as a keyboard player in the short lived bands 96% and XX vek (20th Century), the latter disbanding in 1982, after which he turned to his own solo career. He studied composition and orchestration at the University of Novi Sad music academy, during which he had shown an interest for electronic music. This was the reason why he attended the electronic music course organized at the University of Belgrade by Paul Pignon, a British saxophone player temporarily living in Belgrade. At the time, strongly influenced by the French ambient music composer Erik Satie and British keyboard player and producer Brian Eno, he started recording ambiental music compositions, experimenting with different sounds, including telephone sounds, birds chirping and Amazonian indigenous music.

=== Career in Yugoslavia (1983–1989) ===
Subotić released his first recordings in an original way: the tracks that were signed under the pseudonym Rex Ilusivii were delivered personally by him to the Radio Novi Sad reception desk addressed to Dragan Gojković "Goja", the host of the Yu pop scena (Yu Pop Scene) and Novi Vidici (New Horizons) cult radio shows, which subsequently broadcast the recordings without knowing the author's true identity. After a year of sending new compositions to Gojković every week, Subotić decided to reveal his identity, after which came a live presentation of his work with performances in Novi Sad, Belgrade, Zagreb, Ljubljana, Sarajevo and Subotica. In 1983, with the Novi Sad conceptual artist Lina Bus, Subotić performed in Paris and Venice, and with the comic book artist Zoran Janjetov and multimedia artist Kosta Bunuševac, he organized the first Yugoslav rock performance at the sold-out Belgrade SKC. At the time, Janjetov was one of his key collaborators, as he recommended him to use the pseudonym Rex Ilusivii after a comic-book character, gave him certain ideas and named several compositions.

The compositions recorded in the period between 1983 and 1985 were a part of Subotić's project Promene (Changes), the title being self-explanatory of the musical experimentation Subotić had undertaken, in which Subotić collaborated with a number of already well-known musicians, resulting in a number of true radio hits: Zoran Janjetov "Janja" in the track "Jeti" ("Yetti"), Jakarta vocalist Igor Popović in the songs "Ptice" ("The Birds") and "Arabija" ("Arabia") featuring Tomo in der Mühlen on guitar, Ekatarina Velika frontman Milan Mladenović in the cover of the James Brown song "Sex Machine", Denis i Denis singer Marina Perazić in the song "Plava jutra" ("Blue Mornings"), and Dorian Gray frontman Massimo Savić in the composition "Facedance". The composition "Zla kob" ("Doom"), recorded under the obvious influence of Serbian orthodox music, was included by Zoran Modli on the PGP RTB various artists compilation Ventilator 202 vol. 1, released in 1983. Two years later, the song "Arabija" appeared on the Ventilator 202 vol. 3 compilation.

Subotić's debut studio album Disillusioned, having been turned down by the major Yugoslav record companies, was released as a part of the 30th anniversary celebration of the Radio Novi Sad show Randevu sa muzikom (A Rendezvous with Music) in a limited pressing of 500 copies. The recording sessions featured Milan Mladenović, Uroš Šećerov, Massimo Savić, Električni Orgazam bassist Zoran Radomirović "Švaba", and the pianist Branka Parlić. The album B-side featured the twenty-five-minute composition "Thanx Mr. Rorschach - ambijenti na teme Erika Satija" ("Thanx Mr. Rorschach - ambients on Erik Satie themes"), composed as a kind of a musical Rorschach test on the impressions from Satie's themes. The album back cover featured a dedication to Hrundi Bakshi and a review by the head of the Erik Satie Foundation saying "It is a great pleasure to see that in Yugoslavia a musician, Mitar Subotić - Rex Ilusivii, is working composing some significant material, especially a piece, an homage to Satie, composed in a way that Satie would like best - that everyone finds one's own path and one's personality. The music of Rex Ilusivii presents exactly this formula, this procedure."

Simultaneously with the album recording and release, Subotić had worked on music for television, theatre plays and choreodramas: for Haris Pašović's "Jelka kod Ivanovih" ("Fir Tree at Ivan's") and "Mara SAD" ("Mara USA"), Nada Kokotović's "Nojeva barka" ("Noah's Ark"), "U potrazi za izgubljenim vremenom" ("A Quest for Lost Time"), "Plavobradi" ("Bluebeard") and "Medeja" ("Medea"), and Sookie John "Šma" ("Shma"). He had also worked as a producer and sound engineer for other Yugoslav acts: in 1985 he produced the Haustor album Bolero, the Heroina and La Strada bands' eponymous debut albums, the 1988 Oktobar 1864 album Igra bojama (Playing with colors) and the 1989 Ekatarina Velika album Samo par godina za nas (Only a Few Years For Us). A number of Novi Sad bands, including Obojeni Program, had Subotić as a sound engineer on their recordings, and he had also worked as a sound engineer for the live appearances by Ekatarina Velika and Karlowy Vary. The recording of the Ekatarina Velika 1988 concert at the SMP Novi Sad, with Subotić as the sound engineer, was released in 1997 as Live '88.

The interest for electroacoustic music, which he had shown since his early works through the motifs of Serbian folkloric lullabies, took him to Paris, where, in 1985, he composed theatre music and at the IRCAM institute, he expanded his knowledge in the field of electronic-acoustic music. During his stay in Paris, with Goran Vejvoda he started recording the album The Dreambird, in the Mooncage, which was the last to feature the pseudonym Rex Ilusivii, featuring the combination of recordings of birds chirping, made in Madagascar, combined with Serbian traditional lullabies and electronic music arrangements. The recordings were promoted in an original way in the period between 1986 and 1992 by broadcasting the recordings on the main squares of Yugoslav, Italian and Brazilian cities. Owing to the UNESCO award for promoting traditional culture, which he had got for The Dreambird, in the Mooncage, he got a scholarship to São Paulo where he landed on 15 March 1990 and decided to permanently live. Part of the recorded material was released as The Dreambird in 1994 by the Brazilian label COMEP Music.

=== Career in Brazil (1990–1999) ===
Soon after becoming a resident of São Paulo, Subotić started composing and recording music for radio, television, fashion shows and theatre plays, becoming an acclaimed and distinguished producer, mainly due to his combining of traditional Brazilian music with electronic music arrangements. He had also started collaborating with notable Brazilian musicians and bands of the time: Katia B, Cibelle, Taciana, Bebel Gilberto (the daughter of the famous Brazilian singer João Gilberto), Arnaldo Antunes, Marina Lima, Marisa Monte, João Donato, João Parayba, and Mestre Ambrósio. During the second part of the 1990s, he was credited on a large number of Brazilian albums as an arranger and a producer: on the 1995 albums Kizumba by João Parayba, Janela dos Sonhos by Taciana, the 1996 96 Sessions by Hermeto Pascoal, Andre Geraisatte and J.P, Benzina by Edgard Scandurra, Silêncio by Arnaldo Antunes, Ale Muniz 1997 album Idem, and the 1998 albums Pierrot do Brazil by Marina Lima, Fuá na Casa de Cabral by Mestre Ambrósio and Clubbing by Edson Cordeiro. He had also worked with the former Grateful Dead drummer Mickey Hart and the American band War.

In the spring of 1994, with Milan Mladenović, he started recording material for their collaboration project Angel's Breath, featuring an array of Brazilian musicians (percussionist João Parayba, guitarist Fabio Golfetti, vocalists Mariza and Madalena) combining alternative rock with Serbian and Balkan traditional music. Recorded in three months in leisurely conditions, Angel's Breath featured the prominent tracks "Crv" (Serbian for "The Worm"), "Assassino" (Portuguese for "Murderer") and "Praia do ventu eternu" (similar to "Praia do vento eterno" which is Portuguese for "The Beach of Eternal Wind"). This was Mladenović's last project; on his return to Serbia, on 5 November 1994, he died in Belgrade at the age of 36. The Serbian critic Petar Luković, in a critical review of the album said: "Angel's Breath is not a soft, easy going record; it demands attention, participation; it is an album which corresponds with the listener as much as the listener corresponds with itself. Such Serbian rock albums have never had this, and with the departure of Milan Mladenović, I am afraid will never have...".

In November 1999, Subotić released the album São Paulo Confessions in Brazil by Trama Music, in Europe by Ziriguiboom on Crammed Discs, in Japan by Sony Records and in the United States by Island Records. The album featured guest appearances by the vocalists Cibelle, Katia B and Taciana, jazz guitarist Andre Gerrasiatti, percussionist João Parayba and the members of Mestre Ambrósio. Part of the material from the album was remixed by Phil Asher and the remixes were released as a 12" vinyl EP Você Gosta. São Paulo Confessions received positive critics worldwide. The album review at Allmusic on which the critic John Vallier gave the album four and a half out of five stars. However, on 2 November 1999, on the evening of the São Paulo Confessions album promotion, in an attempt to rescue the recordings from his studio which had been caught up in a fire, Subotić died at the age of 38.

== Legacy ==
After Subotić's death, 2000, a non-profit organization The Suba Institute was founded in his honor in Brazil. Since 2008, the Novi Sad Exit festival world music stage was named Suba Stage. In January 2012, it was announced that the Novi Sad Liman park would get a Mitar Subotić place in honor of the musician. In October 2022, the winning ideal plans for Mitar Subotić's monument, designed by Milana Kulića, were revealed to the public. The commission for the monument was initiated by the Novi Sad European Capital of Culture Foundation with the support of the Mitar Subotić Suba Foundation. On 6 November 2023, The monument was unveiled at Suba's Plateau in Liman Park. The unveiling of the sculpture was attended by many Novi Sad residence, including those who knew the artist and his family.

The song Subotić recorded with Marina Perazić, "Plava jutra", was covered by Ana Sofrenović and the recording appeared on the various artists unplugged compilation Bez struje (Unplugged) in 1994. In 2002, a group of musicians from Brazil and the United Kingdom, including Cibelle, Trio Mocotó member João Parahyba, Marina Lima, Phil Asher and Juryman, recorded the Suba tribute album Tributo. In 2005, the Rex Ilusivii In Vitro / Suba Within Us ballet based on Subotić's life was written by choreographer Aleksandra Ketig and the soundtrack for the play was released on the album of the same name. In 2012, the Suba Connection Band, a supergroup consisting of musicians Subotić's had worked with during his career in Brazil, fronted by João Parahyba, performed at the Exit festival's Suba stage.

In 1988, the various artists compilation Ventilator 202 vol. 1, featuring Subotić's song "Zla kob", appeared as number 100 of the list of the 100 greatest Yugoslav popular music albums in the book YU 100: najbolji albumi jugoslovenske rok i pop muzike (YU 100: The Best albums of Yugoslav pop and rock music). In 2006, the song "Plava jutra" ("Blue Mornings") was number 66 on the B92 Top 100 Domestic Songs list, polled by the listeners of the Serbian Radio B92. The list also featured Ekatarina Velika song "Samo par godina za nas" as number one, Haustor songs "Šejn" as number two and "Ena" as number 11, and La Strada song "Okean" as number 39, all from the albums produced by Subotić. In 2008, São Paulo Confessions was included in the musical reference book 1001 Albums You Must Hear Before You Die, edited by Robert Dimery and published in 2005, being, the only Yugoslav act beside Laibach to be included on the list. The list also featured the Bebel Gilberto album Tanto Tempo produced by Subotić before his death. Tanto Tempo became one of the biggest selling Brazilian albums both in and out of Brazil.

The lyrics of the song "Nabor na postelji (Courage)" ("Wrinkle in the Sheets (Courage)"), from the album Disillusioned!, and "Crv", from Angel's Breath, both written by Milan Mladenović, were featured in Petar Janjatović's book Pesme bratstva, detinjstva & potomstva: Antologija ex YU rok poezije 1967 - 2007 (Songs of Brotherhood, Childhood & Offspring: Anthology of Ex YU Rock Poetry 1967 - 2007).

== Discography ==
=== Studio albums ===
- Disillusioned! (1987)
- The Dreambird (with Goran Vejvoda; 1994)
- Angel's Breath (with Milan Mladenović, released as Angel's Breath; 1994)
- São Paulo Confessions (1999)
- Rex Ilusivii In Vitro / Suba Within Us (2005)
- Wayang (2018)

=== Tribute albums ===
- Tributo (2002)

=== Other appearances ===
- "Zla kob" (Ventilator 202 vol. 1, 1983)
- "Arabia" (Ventilator 202 vol. 3, 1985)
- "In the Mooncage IV", "Outro" (Ex Yu Electronica Vol III, 2012)
