= Ilhas (album) =

Studio album by Violeta de Outono
- Released: May 9, 2005
- Recorded: 2003
- Genre: Progressive rock, psychedelic rock
- Label: Voiceprint Records
- Producer: Fabio Golfetti, Angelo Pastorello

Violeta de Outono chronology
| Live at Rio ArtRock Festival '97 (2000) | Ilhas (2005) | Violeta de Outono & Orquestra (2006) |

Ilhas (Portuguese for "Islands") is the fourth studio album by Brazilian psychedelic rock band Violeta de Outono, released on May 9, 2005, by Voiceprint Records. It was the last album of the band to feature the original line-up of Fabio Golfetti, Cláudio Souza and Angelo Pastorello.

The track "Dança" previously appeared in Em Toda Parte, and was re-recorded for this release.

João Parahyba of Trio Mocotó fame provided additional percussion instruments for some of the tracks.

== Track listing ==
| No. | Title | Length |
|---|---|---|
| 1. | "Línguas de Gato em Gelatina" (Cat Tongues in Gelatin — instrumental) | 3:21 |
| 2. | "Mahavishnu" | 4:21 |
| 3. | "Blues" | 4:58 |
| 4. | "Estrelas" (Stars) | 3:50 |
| 5. | "Ecos" (Echoes) | 3:39 |
| 6. | "Eclipse" | 6:48 |
| 7. | "Azul" (Blue) | 3:04 |
| 8. | "Supernova" (instrumental) | 3:35 |
| 9. | "Transe" (Trance) | 3:08 |
| 10. | "Cartas" (Letters) | 2:57 |
| 11. | "Júpiter" (Jupiter) | 6:19 |
| 12. | "Dança" (Dance — instrumental) | 3:52 |
| 13. | "Moon Princess" | 2:21 |

== Personnel ==
- Fabio Golfetti – vocals, guitar, production
- Cláudio Souza – drums
- Angelo Pastorello – bass, cover art, production
- Gregor Izidro – additional percussion
- João Parahyba – additional percussion
- Fábio Ribeiro – keyboards
- Naide Patapas – backing vocals
