= Espectro =

Studio album by Violeta de Outono
- Released: May 28, 2012
- Recorded: March/April 2012
- Genre: Progressive rock, psychedelic rock
- Label: Voiceprint Records
- Producer: Fabio Golfetti

Violeta de Outono chronology
Ao Vivo no Theatro Municipal (2011)	Espectro (2012)	Live at Rio ArtRock Festival '97 (2015)

Espectro (Portuguese for "Specter") is the sixth studio album by Brazilian psychedelic rock band Violeta de Outono, released on May 28, 2012, by Voiceprint Records. It was the band's first release with new drummer José Luiz Dinola.

== Track listing ==
No.	Title	Length
1.	"Formas-Pensamento" (Thought-Shapes)	8:54
2.	"Montanhas da Mente" (Mountains of the Mind)	5:14
3.	"Dia Azul" (Blue Day)	5:25
4.	"Ondas Leves" (Light Waves)	7:38
5.	"Claro-Escuro" (Chiaroscuro)	5:05
6.	"Algum Lugar" (Somewhere)	4:13
7.	"Anos-Luz" (Light-Years)	4:47
8.	"Espectro" (Specter – instrumental)	1:10
9.	"Solstício" (Solstice)	6:30
10.	"News from Heaven"	9:26

== Personnel ==
- Fabio Golfetti – vocals, guitar
- José Luiz Dinola – drums
- Gabriel Costa – bass
- Fernando Cardoso – keyboards
- Fred Barley – additional percussion (track 10)
- Gabriel Golfetti – ocarina (track 3)
- Alex Angeloni – mixing
- Walter Lima – mastering
- Ruy Galisi – technical assistant
- Victoria Golfetti – inner photo
- Hank Nieman – back cover photo
- Invisível – cover art, design
