= Zoran Janjetov =

Serbian comics artist (born 1961)

- Born: 23 June 1961 (age 65) Subotica, SR Serbia, SFR Yugoslavia
- Areas: Penciller, inker, colorist
- Notable works: The Technopriests; Adventures of young John Difool; Bernard Panasonik

Zoran Janjetov (Serbian Cyrillic: Зоран Јањетов; born 23 June 1961) is a Serbian comics artist. Janjetov is among most prominent comics creators of former Yugoslavia, published worldwide. He is best known as the illustrator of Avant l'Incal and The Technopriests, written by Alejandro Jodorowsky.

During the mid-1980s, Janjetov was a vocalist for the Yugoslav art rock band Heroina, with which he recorded one album.

== Biography ==
=== Early biography ===
Janjetov started to draw at very early age with strong support from his parents. His father, an architect by profession, gave him the knowledge needed to start his career. Young Janjetov was influenced by the works of Walt Disney, and had already made his first short comic at age seven.

After finishing high school, he continued his education at the Academy of Arts in Novi Sad, where he graduated.

=== Career in comics ===
From 1981 to 1995, Janjetov worked on the Bernard Panasonik, published in magazines Yu strip magazin and Vreme zabave.

In 1986, Janjetov was chosen by Alejandro Jodorowski to finish the colour art in The Incal.

Janjetov has drawing illustrations and comics for Yugoslav youth and student newspapers and magazines since the late 70s. He drew The John Difool series of graphic novels from 1986, On the French comics as a colorist under Giraud, alias Moebius and became an artist.

=== Musical career and cover design ===
In 1983, Janjetov became a vocalist for the art rock band Heroina. With the band he recorded one self-titled album, produced by Mitar Subotić and released in 1985.

Janjetov designed the album artwork for Heroina along with artwork for a number of other Yugoslav acts, including Oktobar 1864, Viktorija, Angel's Breath, but also for international world music acts, like Zuco 103, Konono Nº1, Bebel Gilberto, Celso Fonseca, Tartit, Taraf de Haïdouks, Mahala Raï Banda, Kasai Allstars, Kočani Orkestar and other acts.

== Bibliography ==
- Bernard Panasonik, series (1981-1995) Yu strip magazin and Vreme zabave; collected in album (2003), System Comics, Serbia
- Avant l'Incal, written by Alexandro Jodorowsky, Les Humanoïdes Associés, France
1. Les Deux Orphelins (1988), republished under the title Adieu le père (2002)
2. Détective privé de classe “R” (1990)
3. Croot (1991)
4. Anarco-psychotiques (1992)
5. Ouisky, SPV et homéoputes (1993)
6. Suicide Allée (1995)
- Les Technopères written by Alexandro Jodorowsky, colored by Fred Beltran, Les Humanoïdes Associés, France
1. La Pré-école techno (1998)
2. L’École pénitentiaire de Nohope (1999)
3. Planeta Games (2000)
4. Halkattraz, l’étoile des bourreaux (2002)
5. La Secte des Techno-évêques (2003)
6. Les Secrets du Techno-Vatican (2004)
7. Le Jeu parfait (2005)
8. La Galaxie promise (2006)
- Les armes du Méta-Baron : Vol. 1 (2004), written by Alexandro Jodorowsky, co-drawn with Travis Charest, Les Humanoïdes Associés, France
- El Gladiator contre Mango (2010), written by Jerry Frissen, drawn by 38 artists, Les Humanoïdes Associés, France
- L'Ogregod, written by Alexandro Jodorowsky, Delcourt, France
1. Les Naufragés (2010)
2. Sans futur (2012)
- Centaurus, written by Leo and Rodolphe, Delcourt, France
1. Terre Promise (2015)
2. Terre étrangère (2016)
3. Terre de folie (2017)
4. Terre d'angoisse (2018)

== Discography ==
=== With Heroina ===
- Heroina (1985)
