= Astronomy Domine =

Original song written and composed by Syd Barrett

Song by Pink Floyd

from the album The Piper at the Gates of Dawn
- Released: 5 August 1967
- Recorded: 11–13 April 1967
- Genre: Space rock; psychedelic rock; proto-prog; acid rock
- Length: 4:08 (The Piper at the Gates of Dawn version); 8:32 (Ummagumma live version); 4:20 (Pulse live version)
- Label: EMI Columbia (UK); Tower (US)
- Songwriter: Syd Barrett
- Producer: Norman Smith

Audio video
- "Astronomy Domine" on YouTube

"Astronomy Domine" (alternatively "Astronomy Dominé" (Note: The final "e" is spelled with an accent on the original back cover of The Piper at the Gates of Dawn. Since then, most sources (written, CD, YouTube, Spotify) have not used the accent.)) is a song by the English rock band Pink Floyd. The song, written and composed by the original vocalist/guitarist Syd Barrett, is the opening track on their debut album, The Piper at the Gates of Dawn (1967). The lead vocal was sung by Barrett and the keyboard player Richard Wright. Its working title was "Astronomy Dominé (An Astral Chant)". Domine (vocative of Dominus, Latin for "O Lord") is a word frequently used in Gregorian chants.

== Music ==
=== Sounds and references ===
The song was seen as Pink Floyd's first foray into space rock (along with "Interstellar Overdrive"), although band members later disparaged this term. The song opens with the voice of one of their managers at the time, Peter Jenner, reading the names of planets, stars and galaxies through a megaphone. A barely audible line, "Pluto was not discovered till 1930", can be heard in the megaphonic mix. Barrett's Fender Esquire emerges and grows louder. At 0:19, a rapid beeping sound is heard. At 0:26, Nick Mason's drum fills begin and Barrett plays the introductory figure. Keyboard player Richard Wright's Farfisa organ is mixed into the background. Barrett's lyrics about space support the theme in the song, mentioning the planets Jupiter, Saturn and Neptune as well as Uranian moons Oberon, Miranda and Titania, and Saturn's moon Titan. Barrett and Wright provide lead vocals. Roger Waters' bass guitar line, Wright's Farfisa organ and Barrett's slide guitar then dominate, with Jenner's megaphone recitation re-emerging from the mix for a time.

=== Music progression ===
The verse has an unusual chord progression, all in major chords: E, E♭, G, and A. The chorus is entirely chromatic, descending directly from A to D on guitar, bass guitar and falsetto singing, down one semitone every three beats. In the introduction, Barrett takes an ordinary open E major chord and moves the fretted notes down one semitone, resulting in an E♭ major chord superimposed onto an open E minor chord, fretting E♭ and B♭ notes along with the open E, G, B and high-E strings of the guitar; the G functions both as major third to the E♭ chord and minor third to the E chord. In the live version heard on Ummagumma (1969), the post-Barrett band, with David Gilmour on guitar, normalised the introduction into straight E and E♭ major chords, also normalising the timing of the introduction, but, in 1994, Gilmour began performing a version closer to the original (as heard on Pulse) that he carried into his solo career.

Barrett's Fender Esquire is played through a Binson echo machine, creating psychedelic delay effects. The track is the album's only overt "space rock" song, though a group-composed, abstract instrumental was titled "Interstellar Overdrive". Waters, in an interview with Nick Sedgewick, described "Astronomy Domine" as "the sum total" of Barrett's writing about space, "yet there's this whole fucking mystique about how he was the father of it all".

== Alternative and live versions ==
"Astronomy Domine" was a popular live piece, regularly included in the band's concerts. It is the first track on the live side of the album Ummagumma, released in 1969. This version reflects the band's more progressive style of that era. The song is extended by including the first verse twice, and the instrumental middle section, before becoming louder again by the last verse. The lead vocals are shared between Gilmour and Wright. While Wright sang the higher harmony in the studio version, Gilmour sang the higher harmony live. The Ummagumma live version can also be found replacing the studio version on the American release of A Nice Pair, a 1973 double album compiling the band's first two albums.

The last confirmed time the song was performed with Waters was on 20 June 1971 at the Palaeur in Rome, Italy, as an encore. When an audience member called out for it during the group's US tour later that year, Waters retorted they would never play the song again. It reappeared as the first song in some sets on the band's 1994 tour. A version from a concert in Miami appears as the B-side on the band's "Take It Back" single, and a version from one of the London concerts appears on the live album Pulse. Gilmour played the song at some of his appearances during his solo 2006 tour, again sharing the lead vocal with fellow Floyd member Wright. He said of playing the song live for the first time in over 20 years:

[I hear you've dusted off "Astronomy Dominé" for the shows.] Yes, and it needed a bit of dusting, I can tell you! I don't think we'd played it since 1968.

The track is the opening track for Pink Floyd's 2001 compilation album, Echoes: The Best of Pink Floyd.

The Pulse version reverts to the original 4-minute length, with Gilmour and Wright taking lead vocals as in Ummagumma. This was the only song on the 1994 tour with Gilmour, Mason, and Wright performing without backing musicians, with only Guy Pratt adding bass guitar and vocals.

The song was also played by Gilmour and his solo band (which included Wright with Pratt on bass guitar and Steve DiStanislao on drums) at the Abbey Road Studios sessions, which has been released as part of a CD/DVD On an Island package. "Astronomy Domine" was performed during the last few dates of Gilmour's On an Island tour, and is on his Remember That Night and Live in Gdańsk DVDs.

Gilmour has also inserted the song in the setlist of his Rattle That Lock world tour. A version of it performed in South America appears on the live release Live at Pompeii.

The song was played by Nick Mason's Saucerful of Secrets in 2018, and features on the live release Live at the Roundhouse.

== Music video ==
In 1968, Pink Floyd travelled to Belgium and appeared on Tienerklanken where they filmed a lip-synced promotional film for "Astronomy Domine", as well as "See Emily Play", "The Scarecrow", "Apples and Oranges", "Paint Box", "Set the Controls for the Heart of the Sun", and "Corporal Clegg". Barrett does not appear in these films, as he had been replaced by Gilmour who lip-synced Barrett's voice in the "Astronomy Domine" video.

== Personnel ==
The Piper at the Gates of Dawn version

- Syd Barrett – lead and slide guitar (Fender Esquire), low vocals
- Richard Wright – Farfisa organ, high vocals
- Roger Waters – bass guitar (Rickenbacker 4001)
- Nick Mason – drums
- Peter Jenner – intro vocalisations

Ummagumma live version

- David Gilmour – guitar, high vocals
- Richard Wright – Farfisa organ, low vocals
- Roger Waters – bass guitar, backing vocals
- Nick Mason – drums

Live at the Roundhouse live version

- Nick Mason – drums, percussion
- Guy Pratt – vocals, bass
- Gary Kemp – vocals, guitar
- Lee Harris – guitar, vocals
- Dom Beken – keyboards

Pulse live version

- David Gilmour – guitar, vocals
- Richard Wright – keyboards, vocals
- Nick Mason – drums

with:

- Guy Pratt – bass guitar, vocals

Live in Gdańsk live version

- David Gilmour – guitar, vocals
- Richard Wright – keyboards, vocals
- Jon Carin – keyboards, vocals
- Steve DiStanislao – drums
- Phil Manzanera – guitar
- Guy Pratt – bass guitar, vocals

== Cultural references ==
- The album The Dark Side of the Moog X (2005) by Klaus Schulze and Pete Namlook is subtitled "Astro Know Me Domina".
- The Canadian heavy metal band Voivod covered "Astronomy Domine" on their 1989 album Nothingface.
- The Brazilian band Violeta de Outono covered the song on their live album Seventh Brings Return: A Tribute to Syd Barrett (2009).
- The song was covered by The Claypool Lennon Delirium on their EP Lime and Limpid Green (2017).
