= The Early Years (Violeta de Outono album) =

EP of cover songs by Violeta de Outono
- Released: July 21, 1988
- Recorded: Soft Sync Studios, April/May 1988
- Genre: Post-punk, psychedelic rock
- Label: Wop-Bop Records
- Producer: René Ferri

Violeta de Outono chronology
Violeta de Outono (1987)	The Early Years (1988)	Em Toda Parte (1989)

The Early Years is an EP by Brazilian psychedelic rock band Violeta de Outono, released on July 21, 1988, by now-defunct independent label Wop-Bop Records. It is Violeta de Outono's third official release.

It contains cover versions of songs by some of the band's major influences: The Beatles, Pink Floyd, Gong, The Rolling Stones and Led Zeppelin. Those recordings trace to as far as Violeta de Outono's inception in 1985, and were remastered for this release.

Ten years later, in 1999, the EP was reissued on CD under Voiceprint Records, containing an additional track recorded in 1995 as part of the Mulher na Montanha sessions. Unlike the four other tracks, this one was not made available digitially alongside the others.

== Track listing ==
No.	Title	Writer(s)	Original artist	Length
1.	"Citadel"	Mick Jagger, Keith Richards	The Rolling Stones	2:32
2.	"Interstellar Overdrive" (instrumental)	Nick Mason, Richard Wright, Roger Waters, Syd Barrett	Pink Floyd	6:25
3.	"Blues for Findlay"	Daevid Allen	Gong	5:32
4.	"Within You Without You"	George Harrison	The Beatles	3:19

Bonus track
No.	Title	Writer(s)	Original artist	Length
5.	"Echoes/No Quarter"	David Gilmour, Nick Mason, Richard Wright, Roger Waters/John Paul Jones, Jimmy Page, Robert Plant	Pink Floyd/Led Zeppelin	17:17

== Personnel ==
Violeta de Outono

- Fabio Golfetti — vocals, guitar
- Cláudio Souza — drums
- Angelo Pastorello — bass

Additional musicians

- R. H. Jackson — programming, production
- Lívio Tragtenberg — tenor sax (3)
- Anderson Rocha — violin (4)
- Maurício Takeda — violin (4)
- Fábio Tagliaferri — viola (4)

Miscellaneous staff

- Angelo Pastorello — cover art
