= Em Toda Parte =

Studio album by Violeta de Outono
- Released: June 18, 1989
- Recorded: RCA Studios, São Paulo
- Genre: Progressive rock, psychedelic rock
- Label: Ariola Records
- Producer: Violeta de Outono

Violeta de Outono chronology
The Early Years (1988)	Em Toda Parte (1989)	Eclipse (1995)

Em Toda Parte (Portuguese for "All Around") is the second studio album by Brazilian psychedelic rock band Violeta de Outono, released in 1989, by Ariola Records. It was also their last release before they entered a hiatus period in 1993 that would last until 1995. Beginning with this album, Violeta de Outono abandons their post-punk influences and gradually shift towards a more progressive-influenced sonority.

"Terra Distante" would be re-recorded for their next studio album, Mulher na Montanha, while "Dança" would appear on Ilhas.

It was re-released in 2007 by Voiceprint Records, containing two bonus tracks.

== Track listing ==
No.	Title	Length
1.	"Rinoceronte na Montanha de Geleia" (Rhinoceros on the Jelly Mountain – instrumental)	3:25
2.	"Em Toda Parte" (All Around)	3:44
3.	"Vênus" (Venus)	4:00
4.	"Aqui e Agora" (Here and Now)	4:44
5.	"Outra Manhã" (Another Morning)	3:24
6.	"Ilhas" (Islands)	3:20
7.	"Terra Distante" (Distant Land)	4:24
8.	"Dança" (Dance – instrumental)	3:41
9.	"Lunática" (Lunatic)	2:41

Voiceprint Records 2007 re-issue bonus tracks
No.	Title	Length
10.	"Numa Pessoa Só" (In Only One Person)	4:51
11.	"Tropical" (instrumental)	4:52

== Personnel ==
- Fabio Golfetti – vocals, guitar
- Cláudio Souza – drums
- Angelo Pastorello – bass
