= Violeta de Outono =

Brazilian rock band

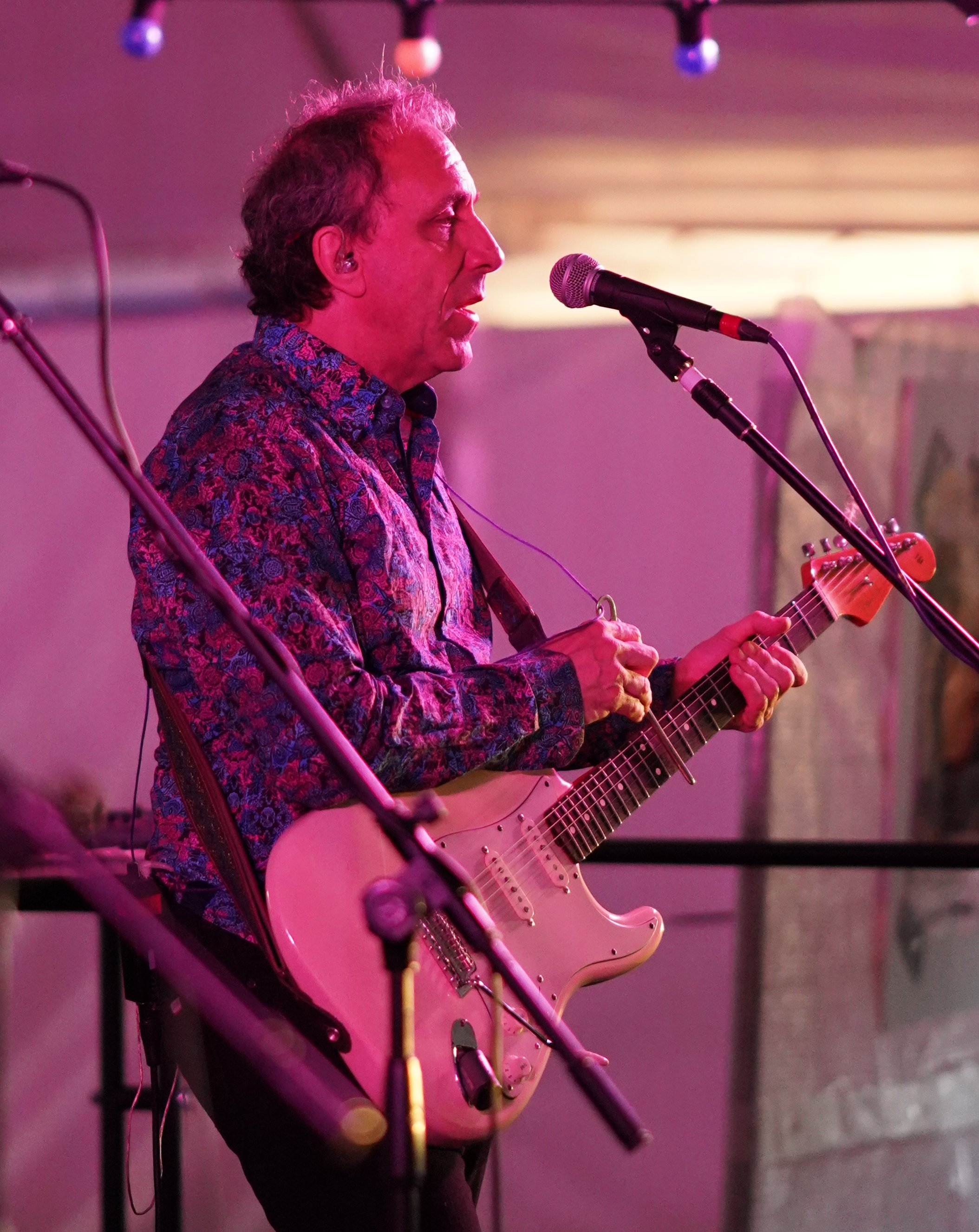
- Fabio Golfetti in 2022

Background information
- Origin: São Paulo, Brazil
- Genres: Psychedelic rock; progressive rock; space rock; neo-psychedelia; post-punk (early)
- Years active: 1985–present
- Labels: Wop-Bop Records, RCA Records, Ariola Records, Record Runner, Voiceprint Records, Rock Symphony
- Members: Fabio Golfetti; José Luiz Dinola; Fernando Cardoso; Gabriel Costa
- Past members: Angelo Pastorello; Cláudio Souza; Cláudio Fontes; Fred Barley; Sandro Garcia; Gregor Izidro; Fabio Ribeiro
- Website: violetadeoutono.com

Violeta de Outono (Portuguese for Autumn Violet) is a Brazilian rock band from São Paulo. Heavily influenced by The Beatles, The Rolling Stones, Pink Floyd, Led Zeppelin and Gong, they were originally a post-punk band with some psychedelic elements intertwined, but would gradually drop their post-punk influences and add more prog elements to their sonority as time went by.

The band underwent numerous changes in its line-up since its inception; the only founding member remaining today is vocalist/guitarist Fabio Golfetti.

== History ==
Fabio Golfetti founded Violeta de Outono in 1985 alongside Cláudio Souza; both had just parted ways with pioneering New Romantic band Zero. They would later be joined by Angelo Pastorello, and with this line-up they released a demo tape, Memories, in the same year. The tape got the attention of independent record label Wop-Bop Records, that released their first recording, the extended play Reflexos da Noite, in 1986.

In 1987, Violeta de Outono's eponymous debut was released through RCA Records. It was very well-received; particular praise went to their cover of The Beatles' song "Tomorrow Never Knows".

In 1988 they released a four-track EP called The Early Years, containing cover versions of The Rolling Stones' "Citadel", Pink Floyd's "Interstellar Overdrive", The Beatles' "Within You Without You" and Gong's "Blues for Findlay". Those recordings trace to as far as 1985–1986. In the next year, their second studio album, Em Toda Parte, was released by Ariola Records. Beginning with this album, Violeta de Outono would drop their previous post-punk instrumentation, heading towards a more progressive and experimental vein.

In 1990, Cláudio Souza left the band, and was replaced by Cláudio Fontes (Souza would return to the band in 1993 though). From 1993 to 1995, Violeta de Outono entered a short hiatus period; they returned to active with a live album, Eclipse, and their third full-length, Mulher na Montanha, that began to be recorded in 1995 but would be released only in 1999. In 2000, they would release their second live album, Live at Rio ArtRock Festival '97, a recording of their performance at the Rio ArtRock Festival in Rio de Janeiro in 1997. (A DVD containing the footage of their performance at the festival would be released 15 years later.) During Violeta de Outono's hiatus, Golfetti released three albums with The Invisible Opera Company of Tibet (Tropical Version Brazil), a side project he formed in 1988; however, the project was not as successful and memorable as Violeta de Outono itself and would come to an end in 1995, only to return in 2010.

Also in 2000, Violeta de Outono changed its line-up almost completely, with Gregor Izidro replacing Cláudio Souza and Sandro Garcia replacing Pastorello. However, they would return for the recording of the band's fourth studio album in 2003, Ilhas, that was released in 2005.

Violeta de Outono & Orquestra, their first video release, came out in 2006, recorded during a performance in São Paulo two years prior, with the special participation of the USP Symphonic Orchestra. In the same year, Pastorello left the band and was replaced by Gabriel Costa, while new member Fernando Cardoso assumed the position of keyboardist. With this line-up they released their fifth full-length album (and seventh studio release overall), Volume 7, in 2007.

In 2009, Cláudio Souza left Violeta de Outono for the third time, but beforehand they recorded another video release, Seventh Brings Return, in which they covered songs by Pink Floyd and Syd Barrett live, and also played their first studio album in its entirety in a show which took place in the Theatro Municipal in São Paulo. Souza was replaced by Fred Barley – however, Barley left the band in 2011 in order to join O Terço, and was replaced by José Luiz Dinola (former A Chave do Sol member); Violeta de Outono's line-up remains unchanged ever since.

Their sixth full-length album, Espectro, was released in 2012.

On September 19, 2016, the band announced that they began work on their seventh studio album, Spaces, which was eventually released on October 14, 2016.

== Line-up ==
=== Current members ===
- Fabio Golfetti – vocals, guitar (1985–)
- Gabriel Costa – bass (2006–)
- José Luiz Dinola – drums, percussion (2011–)
- Fernando Cardoso – keyboards (2006–)

=== Former members ===
- Cláudio Souza – drums, percussion (1985–1990, 1993–2000, 2003–2009)
- Angelo Pastorello – bass (1985–2000, 2003–2006)
- Cláudio Fontes – drums, percussion (1990–1993)
- Gregor Izidro – drums, percussion (2000–2003)
- Sandro Garcia – bass (2000–2003)
- Fred Barley – drums, percussion (2009–2011)

=== Session/live musicians ===
- Fábio Ribeiro – keyboards (1997–2005)

== Discography ==
=== Studio albums ===
Year	Album
1987	Violeta de Outono: Label: PluG, BMG Ariola; Format: LP, CD, digital download
1989	Em Toda Parte: Label: RCA Victor, BMG Ariola; Format: LP, cassette, CD, digital download
1995	Rumo Leste (re-released as Mulher na Montanha in 1999): Label: Invisível/Voiceprint Records; Format: Cassette, CD, digital download
2005	Ilhas: Label: Voiceprint Records; Format: CD, digital download
2007	Volume 7: Label: Voiceprint Records; Format: CD, digital download
2012	Espectro: Label: Voiceprint Records; Format: CD, digital download
2016	Spaces: Label: Voiceprint Records, Rock Symphony; Format: CD, digital download
2022	Outro Lado: Label: Voice Music, Music Magick; Format: CD, digital download

=== Extended plays ===
Year	Album
1986	Violeta de Outono (re-released as Reflexos da Noite in 1995): Label: Wop-Bop; Format: Vinyl, cassette, CD, digital download
1988	The Early Years: Label: Wop-Bop; Format: Cassette, CD, digital download
2004	2002 / 2003 Sessions EP: Label: Invisível; Format: CD

=== Live albums ===
Year	Album
1990	Live at SESC Pompéia 1986 (re-released as Eclipse in 1995): Label: Invisível/Record Runner; Format: Cassette, CD, digital download
1990	Live at Aeroanta SP 1989: Label: Invisível; Format: Cassette, digital download
1995	Lira Paulistana 1985: Label: Invisível; Format: Cassette, CD, digital download
1995	Mulher Na Montanha/SESC Pompéia Ao Vivo 1995: Label: Invisível; Format: Cassette, CD, digital download
1997	Halloween Rock (with Zé do Caixão) (1994/95): Label: Invisível; Format: Cassette, digital download
1998	Live at Rio ArtRock Festival '97: Label: Invisível, Rock Symphony; Format: Cassette, CD, digital download
2018	Violeta de Outono & Orquestra (2004): Label: Invisível, Music Magick, Voice Music, Rock Symphony; Format: CD, digital download
2018	Seventh Brings Return - A Tribute to Syd Barret (2006): Label: Invisível, Music Magick, Voice Music, Rock Symphony; Format: CD, digital download
2018	Theatro Municipal, São Paulo, 2009: Label: Invisível, Music Magick; Format: Digital download
2018	Instrumental SESC Brasil 2016: Label: Invisível; Format: Digital download
2018	Spaces Live 2016: Label: Invisível; Format: Digital download
2018	Violeta de Outono no Estúdio Showlivre (2017): Label: Showlivre; Format: Digital download
2020	Dia Eterno (2017): Label: Music Magick; Format: CD, digital download

=== Video releases ===
Year	Album
2006	Violeta de Outono & Orquestra: Label: Voiceprint Records; Format: DVD
2007	Aeroanta, São Paulo, 1989: Label: Invisível; Format: DVD
2008	SESC Pompéia Ao Vivo 1995: Label: Invisível; Format: DVD
2009	Seventh Brings Return: A Tribute to Syd Barrett: Label: Voiceprint Records; Format: DVD
2011	Ao Vivo no Theatro Municipal: Label: Voiceprint Records; Format: DVD
2015	Live at Rio ArtRock Festival '97: Label: Voiceprint Records; Format: DVD

=== Demos ===
Year	Album
1985	Memories (re-released under Invisível in 1990): Label: Self-released/Invisível; Format: Cassette tape
1991	Ensaios 1984–88: Label: Invisível; Format: Cassette tape
1994	Demotape 1994: Label: Invisível; Format: Cassette tape
1996	Prog Rehearsals: Label: Invisível; Format: Cassette tape

=== Others ===
Year	Album
1991	Studio Sessions (1987–88): Label: Invisível; Format: Cassette tape
1994	Early Years Complete: Label: Invisível; Format: Cassette tape, CD
