= Cibelle =

Brazilian visual artist and musician

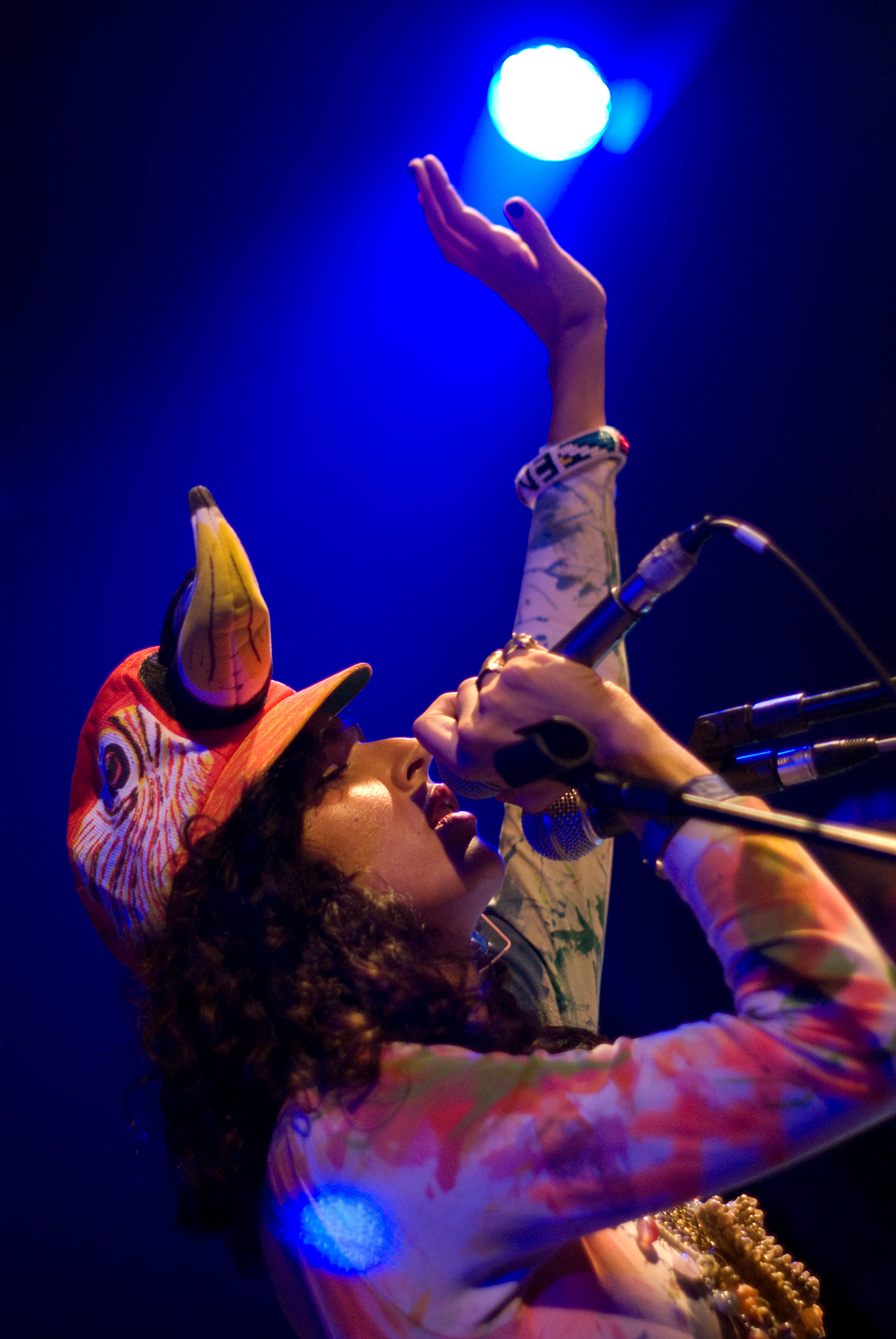
- Cibelle lives in London, England

Background information
- Born: Cibelle Cavalli Bastos; 2 January 1978 (age 48); São Paulo, Brazil
- Genres: non-conforming; experimental
- Occupations: Musician; performance artist; Visual artist; Record producer
- Instruments: Vocals; Guitar; Piano; Electronics; Sampler; Percussion; Multi-instrumentalist

Cibelle (born 2 January 1978), birth name Cibelle Cavalli Bastos, is a Brazilian visual artist and musician. They are based in London, Berlin and São Paulo. They graduated in 2015 from the Royal College of Art in London. Cibelle has released four music albums and has performed and presented work in venues such as Martin-Gropius-Bau in Berlin, Museo Reina Sofia in Madrid, ICA London, and Carnegie Hall in New York.

Cibelle has an interdisciplinary practice that includes performance art, sound art, video, painting, sculpture and installation. Their work addresses the deconstruction and formation of identities and people's interactions with each other and their surroundings.

== Biography ==
Cibelle Cavalli Bastos was born in São Paulo, Brazil. They attended the Marcelo Tupinambá Conservatory in São Paulo from the age of 6, where they studied guitar, piano, percussion and theatre. They had a short career modelling in their teens, but left it to dedicate themselves to acting and art. They worked in musicals, short films, and Brazilian TV, until music took a stronger lead in their life, followed by their focus in art practice and research.

After meeting the Serbian-born producer Suba, they appeared as the main vocalist on his album, São Paulo Confessions, on Ziriguiboom (Crammed Discs' Brazilian imprint) in 1999. A mixture of traditional and electronic sounds, São Paulo Confessions is regarded as an important precursor and a landmark album for Brazilian Electronic Music. Suba died shortly after the album's release.

Cibelle next appeared on Celso Fonseca's album, Natural (2003). Their first solo album, Cibelle, was also released in 2003. Signed to Belgian record label Crammed Discs, at the age of 22, they started spending more time in Europe, specifically Paris. By the completion of their first album, they moved to London's Brick Lane in East London.

== Music and methodology ==
Cibelle creates concept albums.

Their band is made up of around 10 musicians or more who each get together as trios.

Cibelle works by building tracks live on stage, with special guests and audience members contributing to their "bric-a-brac DIY" sound through vocals, playfulness and instrumental experimentation. Since moving to Dalston, they have been working more with visual arts and performance, taking part in the abravanista movement with Rick Castro – also a part of Assume Vivid Astro Focus – and collaborating as a part of collective and artzine FUR, run by photographer Cássia Cabatini and artist/printmaker Fábio Gurjão.

=== Collaborations ===
Cibelle has collaborated with a range of music and visual artists all over the world for recordings, film, performance, and installation, including: Devendra Banhart, The Real Tuesday Weld, Seu Jorge, Celso Fonseca, Cocorosie, Rio en Medio, Gilberto Gil, Júnio Barreto, Vanessa da Mata, Orquestra Imperial, Vetiver, Lightspeed Champion, Josh Weller, David Shrigley, Tom Zé, Johnny Flynn, Quist, Tunng, members of Nação Zumbi and The Legendary Tigerman.

== Discography ==
=== Albums ===
- Cibelle (2003)
- The Shine of Dried Electric Leaves (2006) (cover art by Cibelle)
- Las Vênus Resort Palace Hotel (2010)
- Unbinding (2013)

=== EPs ===
- About a Girl EP (2005)
- Noite de Carnaval/Matthew Herbert Remixes (2005)
- Green Grass EP (2007)
- White Hair EP (2008)

=== Collaborations ===
- Suba (1999), São Paulo Confessions (vocals on 3 tracks), Crammed Discs.
- Suba (2002), Tributo (vocals on 4 tracks), Crammed Discs.
- O Cheiro do Ralo, OST, 2006.
- Electric Gypsyland 2, Crammed Discs, 2006: 1 track by Kocani Orkestar remixed by Cibelle.
- Nove, Apollo (2005), Res Inexplicata Volans, Crammed Discs: vocals on 3 tracks
- Worried Noodles (TomLab Records, 2008): 1 original track
- Femina by The Legendary Tiger Man (2009): vocals on 2 tracks
