= Angel's Breath =

- The founding members of Angel's Breath: Mitar Subotić (left) and Milan Mladenović (right)

Background information
- Also known as: Dah Anđela
- Origin: Belgrade, SR Serbia, SFR Yugoslavia; São Paulo, Brazil
- Genres: Latin rock; alternative rock; Balkan music; neo-psychedelia; experimental music
- Years active: 1985; 1994
- Label: Imago
- Past members: Milan Mladenović; Mitar Subotić; Goran Vejvoda; Fabio Golfetti; João Parahyba; Madalena; Marisa Orth; Taciana Barros

Angel's Breath was a project by Serbian and Yugoslav musicians Milan Mladenović and Mitar Subotić "Suba". Initially named Dah Anđela (Serbian Cyrillic: Дaх Анђела; Serbian for Angel's Breath) and founded in 1985 by the two musicians with the guitarist Goran Vejvoda, the project was reactivated in São Paulo, Brazil, where Subotić had moved to live in the early 1990s, with a lineup of Brazilian musicians.

== History ==
The project Dah Anđela (Angel's Breath) featuring Milan Mladenović (at the time leader of the band Ekatarina Velika), Mitar Subotić "Suba" and Goran Vejvoda, was formed in 1985. The three started writing material that had been performed at several concerts in Belgrade. However, due to the individual obligations of the project members, the band ceased to exist. In the early 1990s, Subotić had moved to São Paulo, Brazil where he continued working as a musician and a producer.

During the spring of 1994, Milan Mladenović went to São Paulo to join Subotić in order to reactivate the Angel's Breath project, and record the material that had previously been written. The two, with Brazilian musicians Fabio Golfetti (guitar), João Parahyba (percussion), Madalena (backing vocals), Marisa Orth (backing vocals) and Taciana Barros (backing vocals) recorded the album Angel's Breath released by Imago during the same year. The album featured Subotić as the album producer and keyboard player and Mladenović on lead vocals, guitar, harmonica and trumpet. The song lyrics were entirely written by Mladenović with the exception of the opening track, "Praia Do Ventu Eternu", written by Taciana Barros, and as music authors appear Mladenović, Subotić, Fabio Golfetti and João Parahyba. The album cover was designed by famous comic book artist Zoran Janjetov. About the whole project Milan Mladenović had said: "This album represents a continuation of my work in fighting against primitivism in today's culture, which had taken its toll mostly due to the ruthless political power games, causing an overall departure from the spiritual".

On leaving Brazil, Mladenović went to Paris in order to record a promotional video for the song "Crv" ("The Worm"), and then returned to Belgrade in order to reactivate his own band Ekatarina Velika. However, the day after the August 24, 1994 performance in Budva at the Pjesma Mediterana festival, Mladenović was held in a hospital, and it was soon discovered that he had pancreatic cancer. A few months later, on November 5, 1994, Milan Mladenović died in Belgrade at the age of 36. Subotić, continued working in Brazil and released a solo album São Paulo Confessions, but a few days after its release, on November 2, 1999, he died in the fire that had caught his studio.

== Legacy ==
Angel's Breath was remastered by Marko Perić and released on LP for the first time by Croatia Records and Milan Mladenović's estate on 29 May 2020. The rerelease topped the Croatian Domestic Albums chart for four weeks.

In 2021 Angel's Breath was polled 31st on the list of 100 Best Serbian Albums Since the Breakup of SFR Yugoslavia. The list was published in the book Kako (ni)je propao rokenrol u Srbiji (How Rock 'n' Roll in Serbia (Didn't) Came to an End).

The lyrics of the song "Crv" were featured in Petar Janjatović's book Pesme bratstva, detinjstva & potomstva: Antologija ex YU rok poezije 1967 - 2007 (Songs of Brotherhood, Childhood & Offspring: Anthology of Ex YU Rock Poetry 1967 - 2007).

== Discography ==
List of studio albums, showing release date, label and chart positions
Title	Details	Peak chart positions
Title	Details	CRO Dom.
Angel's Breath	Released: 1994; Label: Imago; Format: CD, cassette	1
