= A Dweller on Two Planets =

1905 book by Frederick Spencer Oliver

A Dweller on Two Planets, or The Dividing of the Way
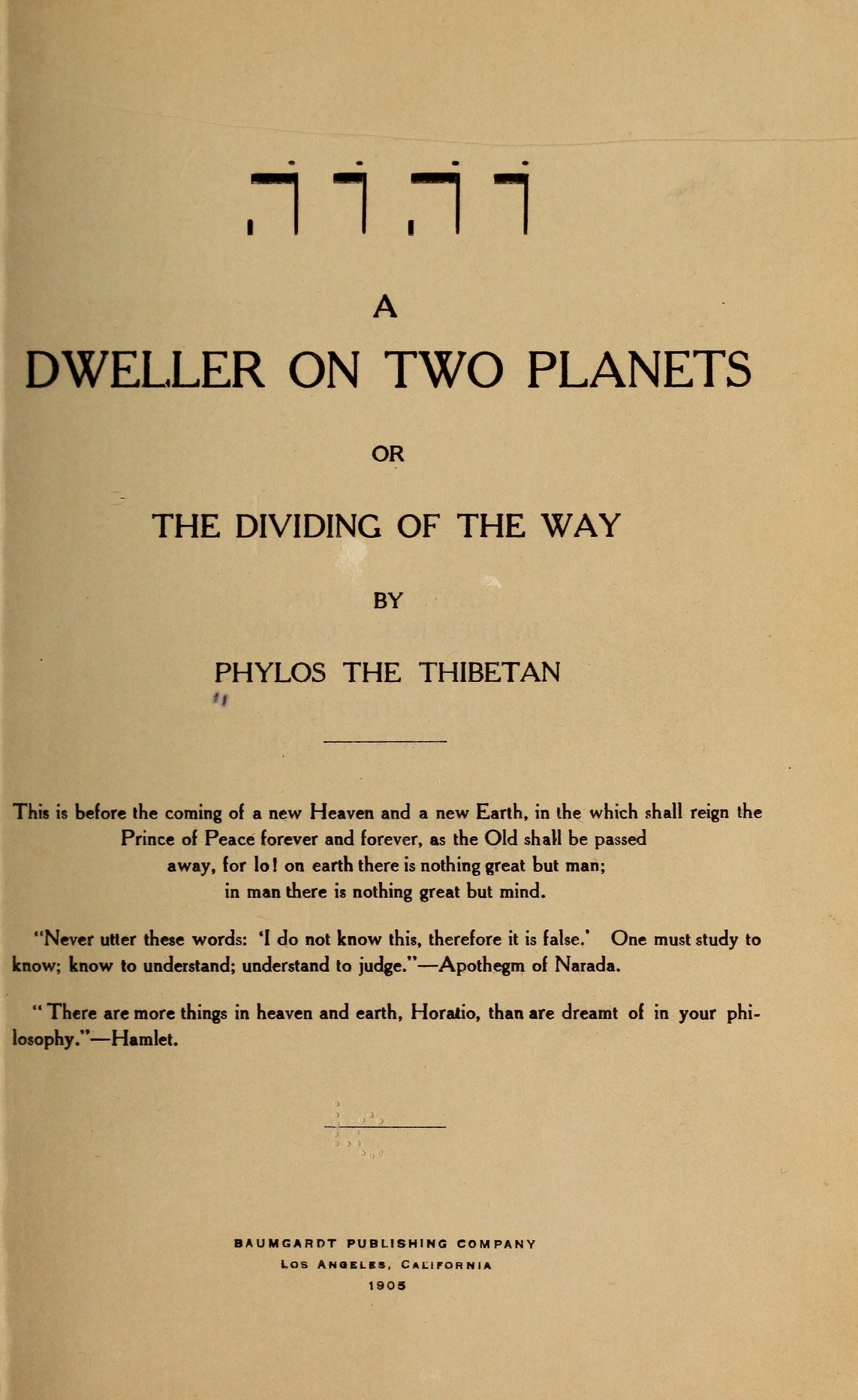
- Title page of first edition
- Author: Frederick Spencer Oliver (within the book, Oliver attributes it to "Phylos the Thibetan")
- Language: English
- Genre: Metaphysics, occult, speculative fiction
- Published: 1905
- Publisher: Baumgardt Publishing Company
- Publication place: United States
- Pages: 423
- LC Class: BF1999 .O42 1905
- Followed by: An Earth Dweller's Return
- Text: A Dweller on Two Planets, or The Dividing of the Way at Internet Archive

A Dweller on Two Planets, or The Dividing of the Way is a book written by Frederick Spencer Oliver (1866–1899). The book was finished in 1886, typewritten and copyrighted in 1894, and again in 1899 owing to an addition. It was not published until 1905 by his mother Mary Elizabeth Manley-Oliver, six years after Oliver's death.

In the amanuensis preface, Oliver presents the book as a true account of the actual past of the true author, called "Phylos the Thibetan", otherwise identified as "Yol Gorro".

== Plot summary ==
In its introduction, Oliver claims that the book had been channeled through him via automatic writing, visions and mental "dictations", by a spirit calling himself Phylos the Thibetan who revealed the story to him over a period of three years, beginning in 1883.

Concerning itself with Atlantis, it portrays a first-person account of Atlantean culture which had reached a high level of technological and scientific advancement. His personal history and that of a group of souls with whom Phylos closely interacted is portrayed in the context of the social, economic, political and religious structures that shaped Poseid society. Daily life for Poseidi citizens included such things as antigravity powered air craft and submarines, television, wireless telephony, aerial water generators, air conditioners and high-speed rail. The book deals with deep esoteric subjects including karma and re-incarnation and describes Phylos' final incarnation in 19th-century America where his Atlantean karma played itself out. In that incarnation (as Walter Pierson, gold miner and occult student of the Theo-Christic Adepts) he travelled to Hysperia in a subtle body while his physical form remained at the temple inside Mount Shasta. Describing his experience with the Hesperian adepts, Phylos relates many wonders including artworks depicting 3D scenes that appeared alive. He saw a voice-operated typewriter and other occult and technical power. Some devices mentioned have become reality (such as the TV and the atomic telescope).

In a detailed personal history of Atlantis and 19th-century North America, Phylos draws the threads of both lifetimes together in familiar and initiatic terms revealing equally their triumphs and failures and exposing the cause and effects of karma from one lifetime to another. His life story is written in personal testimony of the law: "whatsoever a man soweth, that shall he also reap" and as a warning to this technological age to not repeat the mistakes of the past that led to the cataclysmic destruction of "Poseid, queen of the waves".

== Influences ==
The book has been influential on ideas concerning Atlantis, Lemuria and Mount Shasta. In a 2002 introduction, religious text expert John Bruno Hare says that it "is openly acknowledged as source material for many new age belief systems, including the 'I AM' movement, the Lemurian Fellowship, and Elizabeth Claire Prophet." Hare also commented regarding the novel: "Although as a literary work it is weak in many ways, the details of the narrative reveal a well-read and highly intelligent, if inexperienced, author... The real brilliance of this book is as a work of speculative fiction, particularly in the depiction of the high technology of Atlantis, and the afterlife. The book goes into great detail about antigravity, mass transit, the employment of 'dark-side' energy... and devices such as voice-operated typewriters. The cigar-shaped, highly maneuverable Atlantean flying machines... have an eerie resemblance to 20th Century UFO reports. The personalized heavens, almost like virtual realities, are unforgettable and very compelling."

In the analysis of Walter Kafton-Minkel's history Subterranean Worlds, "A Dweller on Two Planets was not very good fiction, but it did establish all the main elements of the modern Mt. Shasta mythos."

In 1940, the Lemurian Fellowship published a "sequel" with the title An Earth Dweller's Return.

== See also ==
- The Incal

== Bibliography ==
- Oliver, Frederick S. Amanuensis Preface in: Phylos the Thibetan. A Dweller on Two Planets or The Dividing of the Way. Los Angeles: Poseid Publishing, 1920.
