= Violeta de Outono (album) =

Studio album by Violeta de Outono
- Released: July 7, 1987
- Recorded: RCA Studios, São Paulo, February/May 1987
- Genre: Post-punk, psychedelic rock
- Label: RCA Records
- Producer: Reinaldo B. Brito, Violeta de Outono

Violeta de Outono chronology
Reflexos da Noite (1986)	Violeta de Outono (1987)	The Early Years (1988)

Violeta de Outono (Portuguese for "Autumn Violet") is the debut album from the eponymous Brazilian psychedelic rock band Violeta de Outono, released on July 7, 1987 by RCA Records. It was re-released in 2007 by Voiceprint Records, containing four bonus tracks.

A music video for the track "Dia Eterno" was made; it was shot in 1987 at the National Observatory, in Rio de Janeiro. It is Violeta de Outono's only music video so far.

== Track listing ==
No.	Title	Length
1.	"Outono" (Autumn)	3:33
2.	"Declínio de Maio" (Decline of May)	5:02
3.	"Faces"	3:41
4.	"Luz" (Light)	4:16
5.	"Retorno" (Return – instrumental)	3:52
6.	"Dia Eterno" (Eternal Day)	3:37
7.	"Noturno Deserto" (Nocturnal Desert)	4:39
8.	"Sombras Flutuantes" (Floating Shadows – instrumental)	6:28
9.	"Tomorrow Never Knows" (The Beatles cover)	3:58

Voiceprint Records 2007 re-issue bonus tracks
No.	Title	Length
10.	"Noite Escura" (Dark Night – instrumental)	4:45
11.	"Caminho" (Path – instrumental)	3:40
12.	"Om Voice" (instrumental)	5:35
13.	"2000 Light Years from Home" (The Rolling Stones cover)	3:35

== Personnel ==
- Fabio Golfetti – vocals, guitar
- Cláudio Souza – drums
- Angelo Pastorello – bass, cover art
- Reinaldo B. Brito – production
- Pedro Fontanari Filho, Stelio Carlini, Walter Lima, Claudio Coev – engineering
