= Tienerklanken =

Belgian Dutch-language pop music television programme

- Title screen
- Genre: Music show, talk show
- Written by: Jean Anouilh
- Presented by: Louis Neefs
- Country of origin: Belgium
- Original language: Dutch
- No. of seasons: 8
- No. of episodes: 173

Production
- Producer: Frans Nauwelaerts

Original release
- Network: VRT
- Release: 1963 – 1973

Tienerklanken (English: Teen Sounds) was a Belgian Dutch language pop music television programme. It was broadcast from 1963 to 1973, running on the Vlaamse Radio- en Televisieomroeporganisatie Belgian television network. It showcased European and American stars of the pop, rock and rhythm and blues genres, such as Jacques Brel, The Rolling Stones, Queen, having their first appearance outside of the UK, The Jimi Hendrix Experience, and Pink Floyd. The show also had segments dealing with controversial counterculture revolution topics, such as drugs and sex.
