= Reflexos da Noite =

EP by Violeta de Outono
- Released: September 12, 1986
- Recorded: Country Studios, São Paulo, June 1986
- Genre: Post-punk, psychedelic rock
- Label: Wop-Bop Records

Violeta de Outono chronology
| Reflexos da Noite (1986) | Violeta de Outono (1987) |

Reflexos da Noite (Portuguese for "Reflections of the Night") is an EP, and the first official release by the Brazilian psychedelic rock band Violeta de Outono. It came out in September 12, 1986 by now-defunct independent label Wop-Bop Records.

The track "Outono" would be re-recorded for their eponymous debut studio album in the following year.

== Track listing ==
All lyrics are written by Fabio Golfetti; all music is composed by Violeta de Outono

| No. | Title | Length |
|---|---|---|
| 1. | "Outono" (Autumn) | 3:20 |
| 2. | "Trópico" (Tropic) | 4:16 |
| 3. | "Reflexos da Noite" (Reflections of the Night) | 6:52 |

== Personnel ==
- Fabio Golfetti – vocals, guitar
- Cláudio Souza – drums
- Angelo Pastorello – bass
