= Dune (cancelled film) =

Cancelled film by Alejandro Jodorowsky

- Pre-release flyer
- Directed by: Alejandro Jodorowsky
- Based on: Dune by Frank Herbert
- Produced by: Michel Seydoux
- Starring: Brontis Jodorowsky; Salvador Dalí; Orson Welles; Gloria Swanson; David Carradine; Mick Jagger; Udo Kier; Amanda Lear
- Music by: Pink Floyd
- Country: France

Dune was a French science fiction film planned by director Alejandro Jodorowsky from 1974 to 1975. An adaptation of Dune by Frank Herbert, the film would have starred Brontis Jodorowsky, Salvador Dalí, Orson Welles, Gloria Swanson, David Carradine, Mick Jagger, Udo Kier, and Amanda Lear, with music by Pink Floyd.

The film ultimately could not secure funding as film studios were offput by the film's eccentricity and over ten hour runtime. Jodorowsky was uncompromising on an avant-garde and surrealist vision, which he said "must not respect the novel". Pre-production was led by sci-fi artists Chris Foss, Jean Giraud, and H. R. Giger. Dalí, cast as Emperor Shaddam IV, made extensive demands for his appearance including an hourly rate of $100,000 (equivalent to $652,834 in 2025), which Jodorowsky planned to pay for one hour.

Despite never being completed, many of the film's ideas directly and indirectly influenced later films such as Alien, Flash Gordon, The Terminator, The Fifth Element, Raiders of the Lost Ark, and Star Wars. The cancelled film was the subject of the 2013 documentary film Jodorowsky's Dune.

== Cast ==
- Brontis Jodorowsky as Paul Atreides
- Salvador Dalí as Shaddam IV
- Orson Welles as Vladimir Harkonnen
- Gloria Swanson as Gaius Helen Mohiam
- David Carradine as Leto I Atreides
- Mick Jagger as Feyd-Rautha
- Udo Kier as Piter de Vries
- Amanda Lear as Princess Irulan

== Production ==
=== Development ===
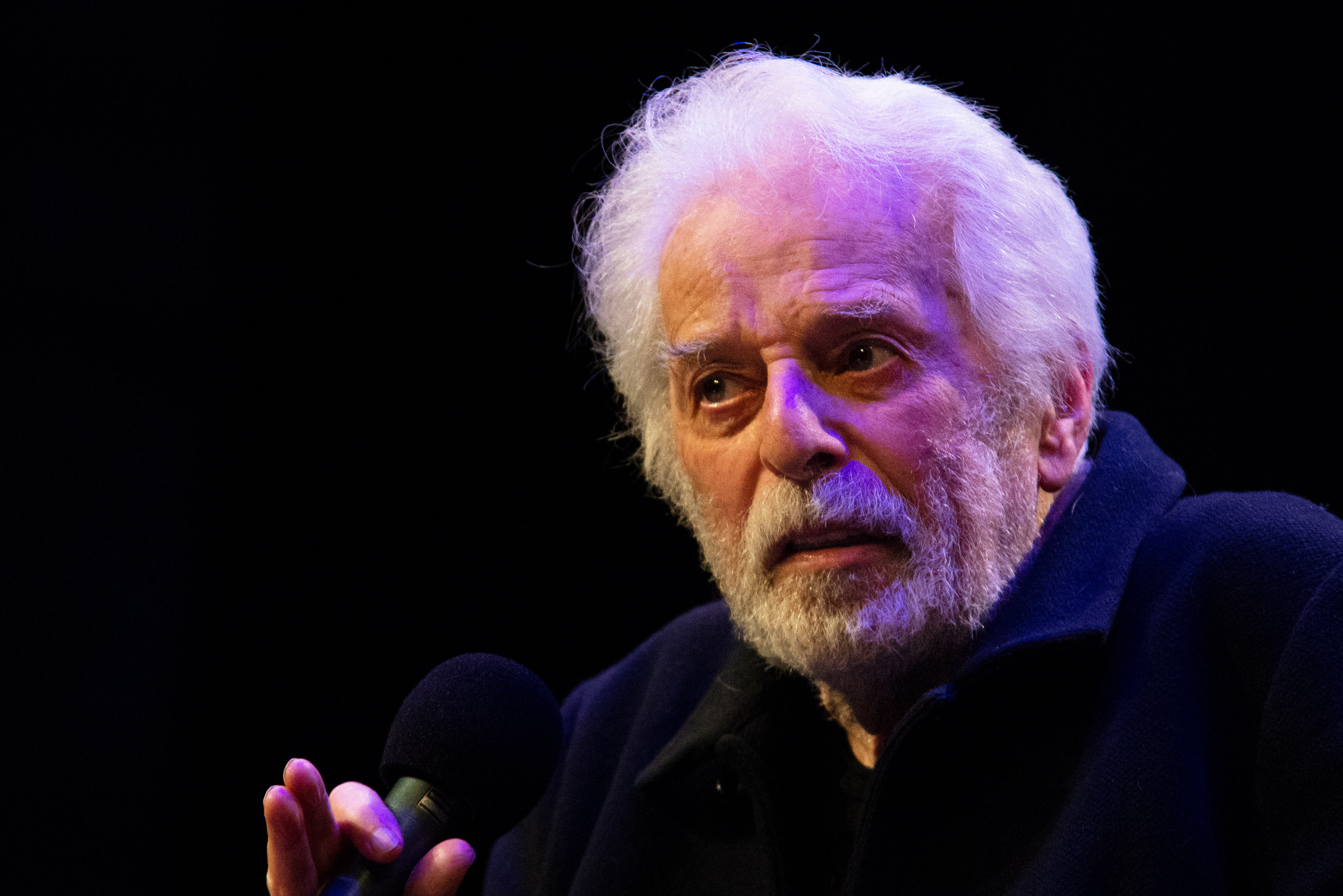
Director Alejandro Jodorowsky

In December 1974, a French consortium led by Jean-Paul Gibon purchased the film rights for the novel Dune by Frank Herbert, with Alejandro Jodorowsky set to direct. Jodorowsky set up a pre-production unit in Paris consisting of Chris Foss, a British artist who designed covers for science fiction periodicals, Jean Giraud (Mœbius), a French illustrator who created and also wrote and drew for Metal Hurlant magazine, and H. R. Giger. Mœbius began designing creatures and characters for the film, while Foss was brought in to design the film's spaceships and hardware. Giger began designing the Harkonnen Castle based on Mœbius's storyboards. Dan O'Bannon was to head the special effects department.

Jodorowsky had little interest in creating an accurate adaptation of Herbert's novel. He had initially not read the book when he began writing his script, and his version of the story differed significantly from the book. He later stated "When you make a picture, you must not respect the novel", and compared his adaptation to "raping Frank Herbert". Jodorowsky envisioned his Dune film as "the coming of a god" and "the most important picture in the history of the world". He stated that it would "change the world" by "mutating the mind of youth". He called his crew of artists "Spiritual Warriors".

Giraud drew 3,000 storyboards detailing the entire film. The film's opening shot was to be a tracking shot that spanned the entire universe. O'Bannon stated that Jodorowsky's pitch for the film gave him a "religious experience" and convinced him to sell all of his belongings and move to Paris to work on the film. Jodorowsky wrote the film's script in a castle that had been rented for him by producer Michel Seydoux. His screenplay for the film would have resulted in a runtime between ten and twelve hours. In 1975, Jodorowsky and Seydoux traveled to Los Angeles, USA, to find a film studio to fund the final $5 million that they needed to begin production. Jodorowsky would not compromise on his vision, insisting on the long runtime, which resulted in the film being rejected by every studio that they approached. The film was ultimately never produced because all of the necessary funding could not be secured.

=== Casting ===
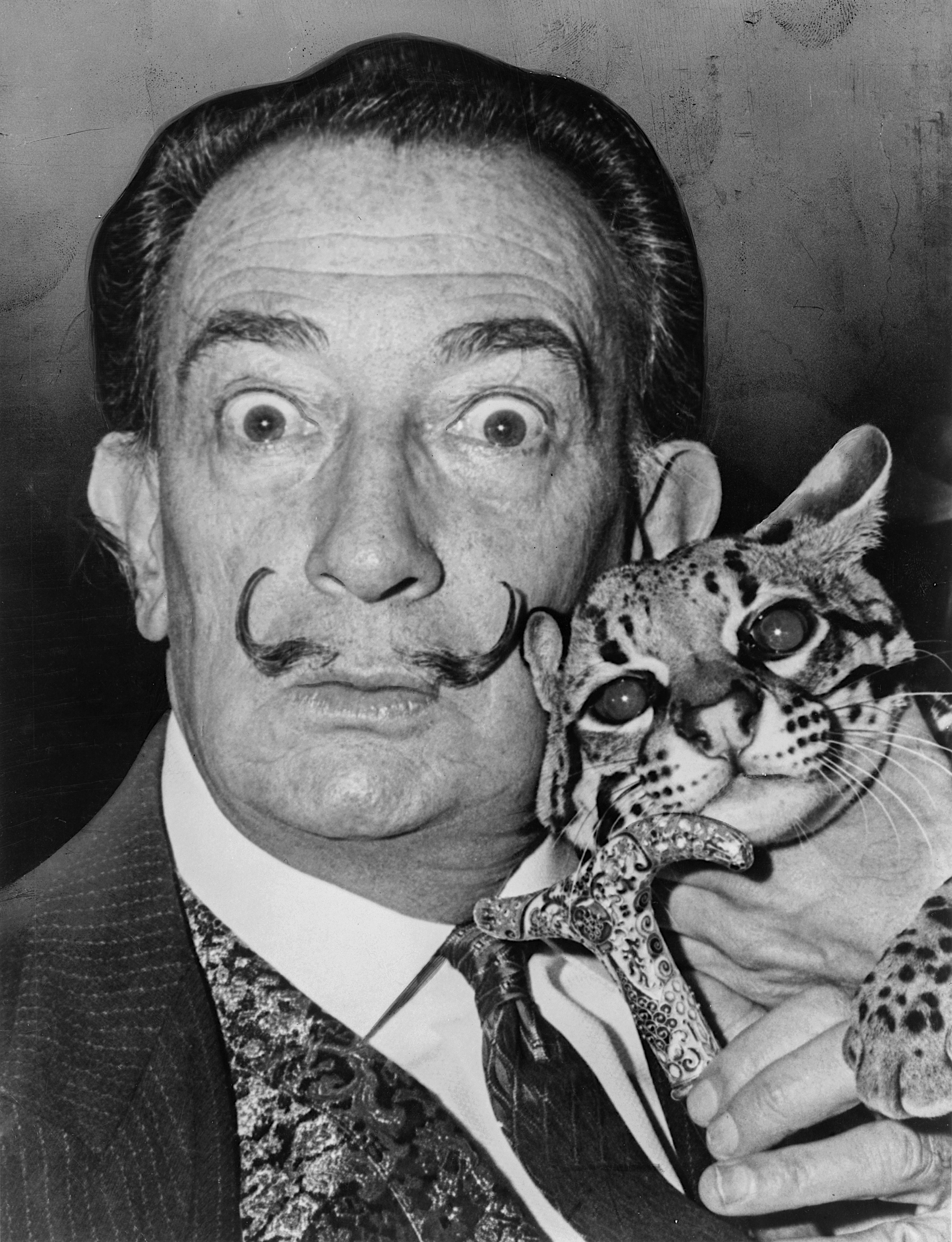
Jodorowsky agreed to pay Salvador Dalí $100,000 (equivalent to $652,834 in 2025) per hour to be in the film.

In the role of Paul Atreides, Alejandro Jodorowski cast his son, Brontis Jodorowsky. For the role, Brontis Jodorowsky was forced to partake in intensive martial arts training for six hours a day, every day, for two years. Alejandro Jodorowski also recruited major pop-culture figures for roles, including Mick Jagger, David Carradine, Udo Kier, Orson Welles, and Salvador Dalí. Welles agreed to be in the film after Jodorowsky promised to get the chef of his favorite Paris restaurant to cook for him every day.

Dalí, who was to play Emperor Shaddam IV, had several conditions for his appearance in the film. He required that his throne in the film be "a toilet made of two intersected dolphins", that his own friends would play as his courtiers, and that he would not read from Jodorowsky's script because he thought that his own ideas were better. Additionally, he requested that he be paid $100,000 (equivalent to $652,834 in 2025) per hour so that he would be the highest-paid actor in Hollywood. Jodorowsky accepted the conditions but then rewrote the script so that Dalí would only need to shoot for one hour.

=== Music ===
The film's soundtrack was to be produced by English rock band Pink Floyd, who had just previously released their album The Dark Side of the Moon. Jodorowsky reportedly came across the band as they were having a lunch break from a studio session, and he yelled at them about how important the film was until he convinced them to make its music.

== Legacy ==
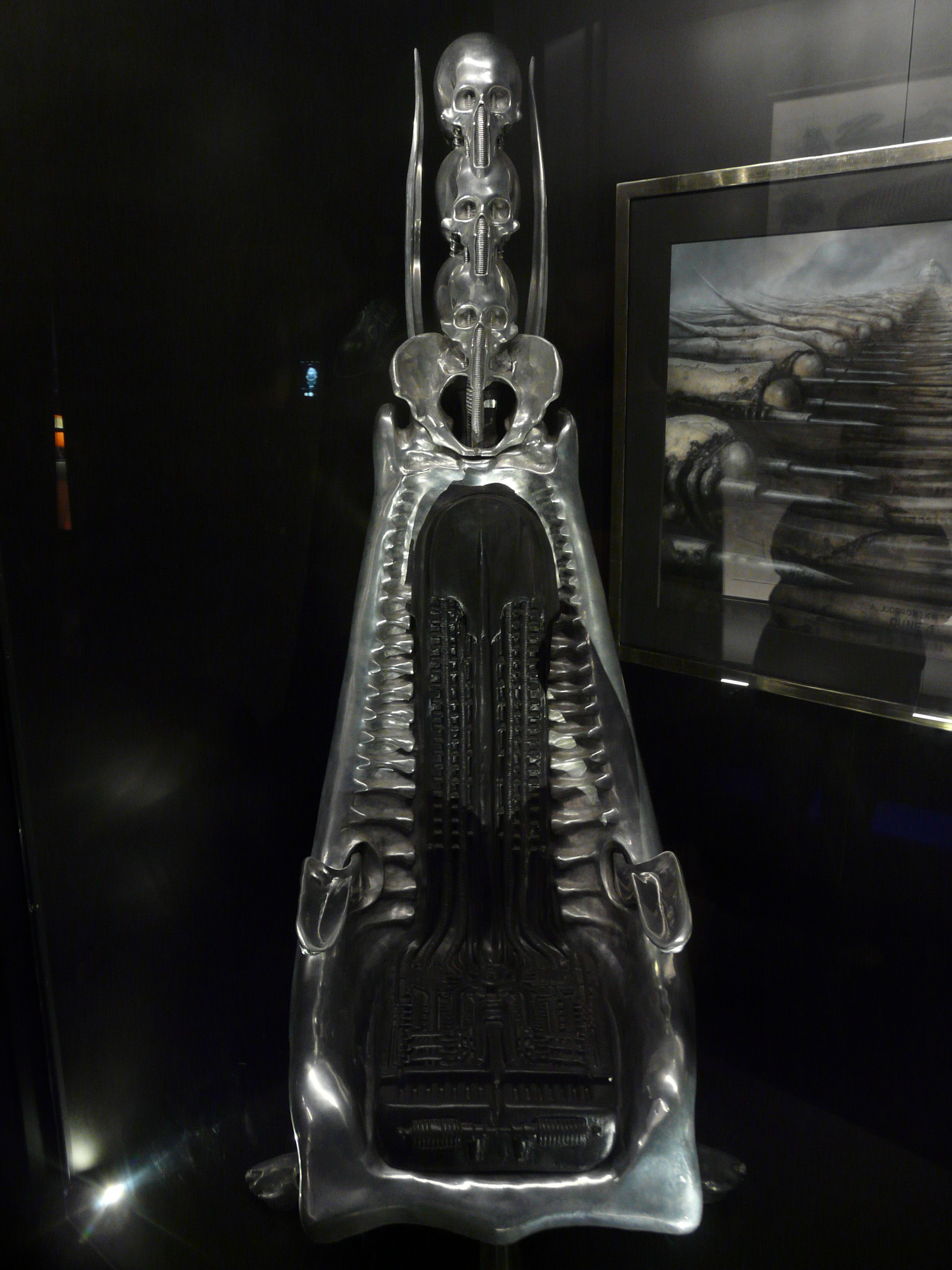
The throne of Baron Harkonnen, designed by H. R. Giger for the film. After the film's cancellation, Giger went on to reuse some of his ideas in Alien.

Although the film was cancelled, it had a lasting legacy on other films and projects. Jodorowsky and Jean Girard reused some of their ideas in their graphic novel series The Incal. Dan O'Bannon, Chris Foss, and H. R. Giger went on to work on the film Alien, for which they reused many of their ideas and designs from Dune. Jodorowsky's illustrated screenplay for Dune was seen by many filmmakers in Hollywood, and elements from it went on to influence films such as Flash Gordon, The Terminator, The Fifth Element, Prometheus, Raiders of the Lost Ark, and Star Wars.

The failed production of Jodorowsky's Dune film was covered in the documentary film Jodorowsky's Dune, which premiered at the Director's Fortnight at the 2013 Cannes Film Festival in May 2013. The documentary film saw critical acclaim. Variety called it a "mind-blowing cult movie" and said that director Pavich "happens upon a compelling theory: that even in its still-born form, the film manifested the sort of collective [consciousness] that Jodorowsky was trying to peddle through its plot, trickling down to influence other sci-fi films that followed". The Hollywood Reporter declared the "entertaining documentary makes the case for this overblown epic as a legendary lost masterpiece". Entertainment Weekly named Jodorowsky's Dune as one of its 10 Best Movies of 2014.

In 2022, a collective of cryptocurrency investors known as TheSpiceDAO purchased one of Jodorowski's story bibles for approximately $3 million. They aimed to produce non-fungible tokens based on the story bible before burning the physical copy. They also stated that they aimed to release the contents of the story bible online for free and produce an animated adaptation of Jodorowski's vision. However, critics noted that the story bible was already available online for free, and that owning the physical book did not grant the rights to adapt the Dune intellectual property. TheSpiceDAO attempted and failed to acquire the rights to produce non-fungible tokens or an adaptation of the book. They ultimately tried to recoup their investment by selling the physical book, although the group's leader noted that there were "no willing buyers".

== See also ==
- Dune (1984 film)
- Dune (2021 film)
- Dune: Part Two
- Dune: Part Three
