= São Paulo Confessions =

Studio album by Suba
- Released: 1999
- Recorded: Wah-Wah Studio (GFI Overseas)
- Genre: electronic, Latin, acid jazz, downtempo
- Length: 61:16
- Label: Ziriguiboom
- Producer: Suba

Professional ratings
Review scores
Source	Rating
AllMusic	4.5/5 stars
Alternative Press	4/5
Rolling Stone	3/5 stars
Uncut	4/5 stars

São Paulo Confessions is an album by the Serbian-born musician Suba—his musical account of life in that humid, foggy, and manic megalopolis.

Core musicians on the album are then 21-year-old vocalist Cibelle, and veteran percussionist João Parahyba; additional musicians include mangue band Mestre Ambrósio, and guitarists Roberto Frejat (then frontman of Barão Vermelho), Edgard Scandurra of Ira!, and André Geraissatti, and vocalists Katia B., Taciana, Joana Jones and Arnaldo Antunes.

== Reception ==
The album was included in the publication 1001 Albums You Must Hear Before You Die.

== Track listing ==
Written by: Tom Jobim (track 6), Antunes (track 10), Béco (track 8), Cibelle (track 8), Katia B. (track 4), Suba (tracks 1 to 5, 7 to 12), Taciana (tracks 1 and 2), Vinicius De Moraes (track 6)

1. Tantos Desejos (So Many Desires) - 4:27
2. Você Gosta (I Know What You Like) - 4:20
3. Na Neblina (In the Fog) - 4:43
4. Segredo (Secret) - 4:03
5. Antropófagos (Cannibals) - 6:22
6. Felicidade (Happiness) - 4:21
7. Um Dia Comum (Em SP) (A Normal Day (In São Paulo)) - 4:59
8. Sereia (Mermaid) - 6:00
9. Samba Do Gringo Paulista (Paulista Gringo's Samba) - 4:49
10. Abraço (Embrace) - 5:05
11. Pecados da Madrugada (Sins Before Dawn) - 5:05
12. A Noite Sem Fim (The Endless Night) - 7:02
