= The Incal =

Graphic novel series by Moebius and Jodorowsky

The Incal (L'Incal)
- 2014 hardcover trade collection of The Incal.
- Main characters: John Difool

Creative team
- Writer: Alejandro Jodorowsky
- Artists: Jean Giraud, Zoran Janjetov, José Ladrönn
- Colourists: Yves Chaland

Original publication
- Published in: Les Humanoïdes Associés
- Date of publication: 1980–2014
- Language: French

Translation
- Publisher: Marvel Comics, Humanoids
- Date: 1988

Chronology
- Followed by: Before the Incal (1988–1995); After the Incal (2000); Final Incal (2008–2014)

The Incal (/ˈɪŋkəl/; French: L'Incal) is a French graphic novel series written by Alejandro Jodorowsky and originally illustrated by Jean Giraud (a.k.a. Mœbius). The series, with first pages originally released as Une aventure de John Difool ("A John Difool Adventure") in Métal hurlant and published by Les Humanoïdes Associés, introduced Jodorowsky's "Jodoverse" (or "Metabarons Universe"), a fictional universe in which his science fiction comics take place. The Incal is an epic space opera blending fantastical intergalactic voyage, science, technology, political intrigue, conspiracies, messianism, mysticism, poetry, debauchery, love stories, and satire. The Incal includes and expands the concepts and artwork from the abandoned film project Dune directed by Jodorowsky and designed by Giraud from the early 1970s.

Originally published in installments between 1980 and 1988 in the French magazine Métal Hurlant, and followed by Before the Incal (1988–1995, with Zoran Janjetov), After the Incal (2000, with Jean Giraud), and Final Incal (2008–2014, with José Ladrönn), it has been described as a contender for "the best comic book" in the medium's history. From it came spin-off series Metabarons, The Technopriests, and Megalex.

== Content ==
=== The Incal ===
The story is set in the dystopian capital city of an insignificant planet in a human-dominated galactic empire, wherein the Bergs, aliens who resemble featherless birds and reside in a neighboring galaxy, make up another power bloc. It starts in medias res with Difool thrown from the Suicide Alley to the great acid lake below by a masked group, luckily saved by a police cruiser. During the questioning he denies that he received the Light Incal, a crystal of enormous and infinite powers (it guides and protects those who believe in it), from a dying Berg. The Incal is then sought by many factions: the Bergs; the corrupt government of the great pit-city; the rebel group Amok (led by Tanatah); and the Church of Industrial Saints, commonly referred to as the Techno-Technos or the Technopriests, a sinister technocratic cult which worships the Dark Incal. Animah (an allusion to anima), the keeper of the Light Incal, seeks it as well. During the journey Difool and Deepo (Difool's loyal concrete seagull) are joined by Animah, The Metabaron, Solune, Tanatah (sister of Animah) and Kill Wolfhead, with a task of saving the universe from the forces of the Dark Incal, and the Technopriests manufacture and launch into outer space the sun-eating Dark Egg. As the darkness is overcome, Difool is brought before Orh, the fatherlike divinity, who tells him he must remember what he witnessed. As Difool falls away, he finds himself where he was at the beginning, falling down the shaft.

=== Before the Incal ===
The story is a considerably more straightforward noir tale of boundless urban corruption with the relative absence of spiritualistic elements, which dips deeper into exploring the urban fabric of the world of The Incal. The story follows young Difool living in demimonde. He soon finds that his prostitute mother devoted herself to growing amorine, a drug that restores the ability to love. His father, Olivier Difool, breaks the law in wearing a fake halo that is the mark of an aristo. Justice is harsh for such transgressions of class — a legal clause "allows the condemned man to choose between a tablet at the morgue-wall, where he'll sleep away his thirty-year-and-one-day term", or "remodeling", which means having his entire memory wiped. His father chooses remodeling. Difool soon begins to investigate the mystery of the disappearance of prostitutes' children, something he shouldn't find out.

=== Final Incal ===
The story from the unfinished After the Incal was rewritten to provide a separate narrative for this volume. The story starts after The Incal climax, in which John Difool encountered a flowing-bearded divine being named Orh, witnessing a universe-shaking event, hurtling towards certain death in the acid lake. DiFool forgets about the cosmic encounter, and recovers his memory as the universe faces the threat of a metallic virus. The Prezident was cloned in a metallic body, equipped with both chemical and brutal weapons, but also an altered mind — operating under the influence of the "destroyer of all living things", the Benthacodon (equivalent to The Incal's Black Egg). He unleashes a destructive organic virus called the Biophage 13-X with the purpose of forcing the population to abandon their natural bodies in favor of robotic ones. The only way to counteract is to reunite John Difool with his true love, Luz de Garra (from Before the Incal), and the Elohim (a force of goodness) makes four John Difools from different realities to encounter each other on a quest to find her. The egos of the allegedly evolved guru Difool and the super-evolved "angelic" Difool are ridiculed, and the least enlightened Difool, the ugliest and most craven, is selected to save the universe. In the end, the cosmic humanity manages to become one collective consciousness, as true love saves it from turning into a collection of unfeeling metallic beings.

== Main characters ==
- John Difool, protagonist: a Class R licensed private investigator and occasional bodyguard. Difool is reluctant to assume the role of hero, and suffers mood swings, self-doubt, and temper tantrums. He has a fondness for cigars, "ouisky", and "homeosluts" (gynoid prostitutes). He is an everyman character, both unusually damning and praising of the human condition, kindly, sacrificing and selfish, likely to run away. His story is presented in "Before the Incal": he is the son of a prostitute, and started as a PI while investigating on the children of the red ring prostitutes.
- Deepo, Difool's loyal and good-hearted "concrete seagull"; generally smarter and more resourceful than John himself. Early in the story, the Light Incal gives him the power of speech.
- Animah and Tanatah, two sisters charged with guarding the Light and Dark Incals, respectively. In such duties, Tanatah hired the Metabaron to kill John DiFool and obtain the Light Incal. Animah, mother of Solune, who originally safeguarded the Light Incal, has psychic powers. Tanatah is also the head of the rebel group called the Amok.
- The Metabaron, the greatest bounty hunter, mercenary, and fighter ace in the known universe, and the adopted father of Solune; originally sent to kill John Difool by Tanatah. The Metabaron returned John in a frozen state without killing him, knowing that Tanatah would betray him.
- Solune (French words soleil and lune), the adopted child of the Metabaron and the biological child of Animah and John Difool. Like Animah, Solune has immense psychic powers, and was the chosen host of the power known as the Incal, destined to become the dual-gendered leader of the universe.
- Kill Wolfhead, an anthropomorphic wolf mercenary in Tanatah's employ. Kill holds a grudge against DiFool, who pierced his ear with a bullet near the beginning of the story. He is portrayed as faithful, loyal, impulsive and aggressive.

== Analysis ==
"I dreamed I was flying in intergalactic space. A cosmic being formed by two superimposed pyramids, one black, the other white, was calling me. I moved toward it and found myself submerged in the center. We exploded. And that’s how my subconscious mind introduced me to "El Incal"".

— Jodorowsky on the Incal.

The center of the concept is Difool's fantastic spiritual journey (or initiation) on a cosmic scale, which he is reluctant to accept; he constantly wishes to return to his own ignorant reality of simple hedonistic pleasures. It is an allegory for the sins repeating, the futility of complacency and the necessity for individual transformation. As the story progresses he keeps changing, becoming more heroic, even physically more handsome. The original six installments begin and end by DiFool falling from the bridge; he descends, ascends and later re-descends in "closed" circularity.

The universe is split into two galaxies, a human (with 22,000 planets), and a Berg (featherless birdlike aliens), and the story is set on four planets in the human galaxy: Ter21, Techno-Gea, Aquaend, and the Golden Planet.

On the planet Ter21 there are two social classes: the fortunate (common and aristocrats), who reside at the top, and the others (including the mutants led by Gorgo the Foul, who represent the poor living in misery, on the fringes of society, minorities of all kinds), who live down in the pits. At the top, it's a near-panopticonical dystopia with standard TV program (with the same presenter Diavaloo) depicting filmed violence for public consumption, and indoctrination. Seemingly no one works anymore, and all life is mediated through the TriD (TV), even people's dreams. People are addicted to "love drug" amorine, while the president is engaged in repeated body transplants. The masculine role is ridiculed by mass-produced holographic prostitutes. The technopriests represent the most damning, avaricious human drives.

John Difool is based upon The Fool from tarot with his name being a pun upon "John, the Fool". Animah's name is based on the Jungian concept of the anima, the feminine part of every male's psyche, as well in Latin "anima" means "psyche". The series has no taboos, an attitude towards sex, violence and general social stigmas that may be avoided in more conventional comics. They include black-and-white dualism or the conflict between good and evil, mystical symbolism, archetypes, metaphysics, tarot and other influences. In the story there's often a conflict between life or nature and dead technology (even uniformity and diversity), as "glasses enable you to see, that's technology. But happiness is not that, it's not your glasses. It's what you are able to see. If you have wonderful glasses but don't know how to see what's in front of you, then that technological tool is useless". The series also showcases religion, economy, politics and warfare, all mixed together.

The Final Incal is kind of a call for revolt to organize life in a different way, because as individuals people are mortal, but as humanity itself they are immortal. To learn that others exist, to live together and give, that there is continuity only as part of humanity as a whole. It demonstrates that "love is the ultimate purifier; a force that can cleanse, renew and revitalize".

== Style ==
The series capture worlds with cityscapes, huge spacecraft and lands populated by technopriests, rubbish-dwelling mutants, doppelgängers, giant jellyfish, chiming forests of gems and jostling, old gurus floating on crystals, an underground rat army, flying leeches, "necro-panzers", a selfish humanity among others. Some touches are borrowed directly from Dune: the Emperoress, a "perfect androgyne", or Aquend, a planet composed entirely of water which is Arrakis's seeming opposite, and a "mentrek" who betrayed his former master.

Jean Giraud's (also known as Moebius) artwork and Yves Chaland's colouring from The Incal were well praised. Jodorowsky initially didn't have a script, but recounted and mimed the ideas to Moebius who sketched the scenario, recorded their conversation on tape, and they jointly altered the plot. Jon Evans considered resemblance to the De Stijl school of art inspired by artists like Piet Mondrian and Vilmos Huszár.

Moebius refused to do Before the Incal, thus Jodorowsky found Zoran Janjetov. Although Janjetov had his own style, he was influenced by Moebius and imitated him. Finally, Moebius decided to do After the Incal, but beside his illness at the time he had a different style, and Jodorowsky was not satisfied by the overall work. He depicted the nightmare of the tech-world with a more abundant sense of optimism, something peppered with light and hope throughout.

José Ladrönn's rendition of the worlds that Moebius originally designed in the rewritten sequel Final Incal is much darker and grittier; the streets are emptier, less colorful, more muted. He excelled at drawing, but as if he has studied not only Moebius but also the movies that Moebius influenced, directly or indirectly (like Blade Runner).

== Publication history ==
The Incal was initially serialized in French between 1980 and 1985 in the magazine Métal Hurlant, which was published by Les Humanoïdes Associés. An English translation was serialized in the magazine Heavy Metal (published by National Lampoon) from 1982 to 1984. Concurrent with its serialization in Métal Hurlant, Les Humanoïdes Associés collected the series as six hardcover volumes: L'Incal Noir (1981), L'Incal Lumière (1982), Ce qui est en bas (1984), Ce qui est en haut (1985), La cinquième essence – Galaxie qui Songe (1988), and La cinquième essence – La planète Difool (1988). In 1988, Epic Comics (a division of Marvel Comics) published The Incal in three volumes as a part of their "Epic Graphic Novels" line, with translation by Jean-Marc Lofficier and Randy Lofficier.

Later, between 2001 and 2002, was republished a series of The Incal and Before the Incal in a twelve-issue limited series, with the former in two parts, Orphan of the City Shaft and John Difool, Class "R" Detective, between 2002 and 2003, while the first in two parts The Epic Conspiracy and The Epic Journey softcover trade format by Humanoids Publishing. The Humanoids Publishing initial version (of both The Incal and Before the Incal) was recolored in a more modern style and had the nudity censored. Jodorowsky did not like the change of the series to seduce a young audience.

In December 2010, Humanoids released a limited and oversized hardcover edition of The Incal, with 750 copies printed. It was sold out and soon the series was out of print in the United States. In 2011 more hardcovers were released by Humanoids Publishing in the US and Self Made Hero in the UK. Smaller than the oversized hardcover edition, they resemble it in that they restore the original colouring and remove the censorship. In 2012 Humanoids Publishing released 9.4 x 12.6" limited deluxe edition of Before the Incal with a foreword by José Ladrönn, artist on the upcoming Final Incal. Between January 2013 and 2014, they released a sold-out 12 x 16" limited coffee table edition of The Incal six volumes.

In 2014, Humanoids released 7.9 x 10.8" hardcover trade collection of The Incal and its sequels, After the Incal and Final Incal, in one complete collection called Final Incal, as a 9.5 x 12.5" deluxe slipcase hardcover, as well limited and numbered edition 12 x 16" coffee table format. In 2015 they released a 7.9 x 10.8" hardcover trade edition, but without After the Incal. All four volumes were digitally released by Humanoids Publishing in 2014.

Humanoids released three prequel graphic novels as part of the Incal Universe project, to which Alejandro Jodorowsky gave his blessing: Psychoverse by Mark Russell and Yanick Paquette, Dying Star by Dan Watters and Jon Davis-Hunt, and Kill Wolfhead by Brandon Thomas and Pete Woods. Psychoverse was released on November 15, 2022, while Kill Wolfhead was the English-language debut of Kill Tête-de-Chien, released on November 17 2021, in France.

The series was translated from French into more than eleven languages, selling millions of copies.

=== Volumes ===
==== The Incal ====
Note: For particulars on the English language editions of this series, please refer to the main article.

1. L'Incal Noir ("The Black Incal") (1981)
2. L'Incal Lumière ("The Luminous Incal") (1982)
3. Ce qui est en bas ("What Lies Beneath") (1984)
4. Ce qui est en haut ("What is Above") (1985)
5. La cinquième essence – Galaxie qui Songe ("The Fifth Essence – The Dreaming Galaxy") (1988)
6. La cinquième essence – La planète Difool ("The Fifth Essence – Planet DiFool") (1988)

==== Before the Incal ====
1. Adieu le père ("Farewell, father") (1988)
2. Détective privé de "Classe R ("Class "R" Detective") (1990)
3. Croot! (1991)
4. Anarchopsychotiques ("Psycho Anarchist") (1992)
5. Ouisky, SPV et homéoputes ("Vhisky, SPV and Homeo-Whores") (1993)
6. Suicide Allée ("Suicide Alley") (1995)

A prequel series to the first Incal series, published after it.

==== After the Incal ====
1. Le nouveau rêve ("The New Dream") (2000)

Left unfinished but The New Dream is remade and expanded in the first volume of Final Incal.

==== Final Incal ====
1. Les Quatre John Difool ("The Four John DiFools") (2008)
2. Louz de Garra ("Luz De Garra") (2011)
3. Gorgo Le Sale ("Gorgo the Foul") (2014)

== Reception and legacy ==
Rolling Stone magazine in "The 50 Best Non-Superhero Graphic Novels" list placed the original volume as #30, calling it "one of the great comics team-ups". Patrick Hess from Nothing But Comics placed it as fourth out of seventy best comics list, as "there are very few comics ever created in the history of the medium that are this imaginative, this thoughtful, this heartfelt or this good".

Mark Millar called it "quite simply one of the most perfect comics ever conceived and probably the most beautiful piece of graphic literature ever drawn".

Anthony Paletta from Los Angeles Review of Books considered that "The Incal isn't only a parade of thrilling grotesqueries: it also has a spiritual core that ... reflects Jodorowsky’s abiding idiosyncratic Buddhism", while "Moebius’s work is simply some of the most beautiful not merely in his catalog, but in the comics world at large". He noted that the "echoes of The Incal can also be found in the work of Hayao Miyazaki, Katsuhiro Otomo’s Akira, the decaying futurity of Ridley Scott’s Blade Runner, The Matrix, and even depictions of Coruscant in the Star Wars prequel films.

Daniel Kalder from The Comics Journal noted that the drawing by Moebius in After the Incal was of lesser ability, also saying: "Moebius was and always will be The Man but he was not the man for this story: Ladrönn was. And so while After the Incal is certainly an intriguing footnote, a glimpse of a path not taken, Final Incal is the real deal".

Hugh Armitage from Digital Spy noted that Moebius's After the Incal "delivers some typically breathtaking scenery, but his characters take on a cartoonish, Sergio Aragonés-like style that is both atypical for the artist and at odds with the dark story. [Valérie] Beltran's colours leave the images looking flat and uninteresting", and praised the Ladrönn's artwork in Final Incal.

=== Legal issues ===
The publishers sued Luc Besson, director of The Fifth Element (1997), claiming that the film borrowed graphic and story elements from The Incal, but lost their case. In an interview given to Chilean newspaper The Clinic, Jodorowsky claimed that neither he nor Moebius actually sued Besson, but instead that the lawsuit was filed by the editor of the comic series. He further claimed that the case was lost because Moebius "betrayed them" by working directly with Besson on the production of the film. In a 2002 interview with the Danish comic book magazine Strip!, Jodorowsky considered it an honour that somebody stole his ideas.

== Adaptations ==
In the 1980s the Canadian animation director Pascal Blais created a short trailer for The Incal (i.e. Dark Incal), but the movie was never made. In 2011 and 2016, his studio made updated versions of the original trailer.

In 2013, in an interview by France Inter, Nicolas Winding Refn was reportedly working as a director on a live-action movie adaptation of The Incal, but it appeared to have been a rumor that Winding Refn dismissed in 2016.

US black metal band Bihargam released the album Ove Tenebrae as a musical adaption of The Incal on October 16, 2020.

In 2021, Jodorowsky officially announced a big screen adaptation directed by Taika Waititi, from a screenplay he co-wrote with Jemaine Clement and Peter Warren.

== See also ==
- A Dweller on Two Planets, origin of the term incal
