= Vreme zabave =

Serbian popular culture magazine

- Cover of the May 1994 issue, featuring Zoran Kostić "Cane" of Partibrejkers
- Editor-in-Chiefs: Petar Luković
- Categories: Popular culture
- Frequency: Monthly
- Publisher: NP Vreme
- Founded: 1993
- First issue: November 1993
- Final issue: June 1996
- Country: FR Yugoslavia
- Language: Serbian

Vreme zabave (Serbian Cyrillic: Време забаве, trans. Time of Entertainment) was a Serbian popular culture magazine.

== History ==
Vreme zabave was launched in 1993 by newspaper company Vreme. The magazine's editor-in-chief was journalist and music critic Petar Luković. The first issue was released in June 1993, with the price of 2,000,000 dinars. The last, 31st issue, was released in June 1996.
