= The Technopriests =

Comic book limited series

Publication information
- Format: Limited series
- Genre: Action/adventure, biopunk, comic fantasy, comic science fiction, dark fantasy, gothic science fiction, philosophical, science fantasy; Anthropomorphic
- Publication date: April 1998 – September 2006
- No. of issues: 8

Creative team
- Written by: Alejandro Jodorowsky
- Artist: Zoran Janjetov
- Colorist: Fred Beltran

The Technopriests (French: Les Technopères) is a French eight-issue comic book limited series created by writer Alejandro Jodorowsky, artist Zoran Janjetov and colorist Fred Beltran.

== Story ==
The Technopriests follows three plots: the first follows Albino, as Supreme Technopriest, as he leads 500,000 young technopriests to the promised galaxy and the obstacles that they encounter along the way. During this time Albino also narrates, in the form of dictating his memoirs. The other two plots describe his rise to the position of Supreme Technopriest and the experiences of his family during that same time period.

Albino is an old man, recording his memories in the spaceship where he navigates through space with his pet Tinigrifi, leading 500,000 young technopriests to the promised galaxy. His story begins when a spaceship of pirates attack on the sacred asteroid where Panepha, a young virgin destined to become oracle of the Imperial Palace, lived. The pirates rape Panepha and she gives birth to three children: Almagro, Albino and Onyx. Onyx is rejected by her mother, who creates and leads the Great Kamenvert Factory. But Albino does not like making cheese, he wants to be a videogame creator. With some reluctance, his mother sends him to Don Mossimo, the director of a technopriest training school. There he begins his journey to become Supreme Technopriest and start a new society, where human relationships will be valued more highly than scientific advances.

== Characters ==
- Albino: the future Supreme Technopriest and the narrator of the series.
- Tinigrifi: Albino's lifelong companion and co-narrator.
- Panepha: former priestess and mother of Almagro, Albino, and Onyx.
- Almagro: Albino's older half-brother as well as one of his triplet siblings and the most-favored child of Panepha.
- Onyx: Albino's younger half-sister as well as one of his triplet siblings and the least-favored child of Panepha.

== Albums ==
The Technopriests was originally released in 8 issues:

- La Pré-école Techno (1998)
- L'École pénitentiaire de Nohope (1999)
- Planeta Games (2000)
- Halkattrazz, l'étoile des Bourreaux (2002)
- La Secte des Techno-évêques (2003)
- Les Secrets du Techno-Vatican (2004)
- Le Jeu parfait (2005)
- La Galaxie Promise (2006)

== See also ==
- The Incal

== Sources ==
- Technopriests at the Comic Book DB (archived from the original)
