= Fabio Golfetti =

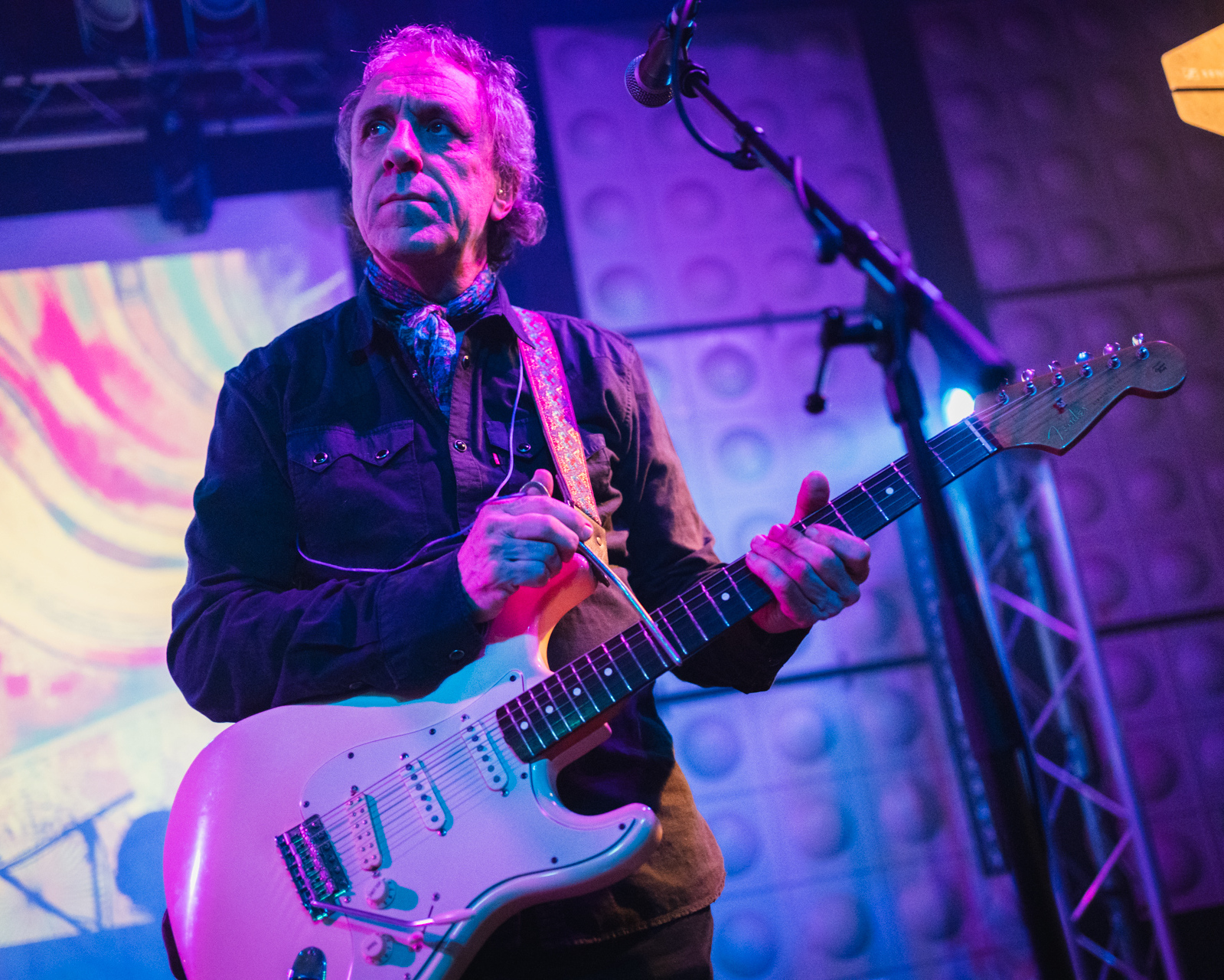
- Golfetti with Gong in 2025

Background information
- Born: April 10, 1960 (age 66); São Paulo, Brazil
- Genres: Progressive rock; post-punk; psychedelic rock
- Occupations: Singer-songwriter; record producer
- Instruments: Guitar; vocals
- Years active: 1978–present
- Labels: Wop-Bop Records; RCA Records; Ariola Records; Voiceprint Records
- Member of: Violeta de Outono; The Invisible Opera Company (Tropical Version Brazil); Gong
- Formerly of: Zero; Angel's Breath
- Website: fabiogolfetti.com

Fabio Golfetti (born April 10, 1960) is a Brazilian musician and record producer, famous for his work with progressive/psychedelic rock band Violeta de Outono. He is also the guitarist of Franco-British rock band Gong since 2012.

== Biography ==
Fabio Golfetti was born in São Paulo in 1960. He grew up listening to Pink Floyd, Gong, Led Zeppelin, The Beatles and The Rolling Stones (with their 1967 album Their Satanic Majesties Request being one of his favorite releases by them), and as a teenager he learned how to play both the classical and the electric guitar, quoting Daevid Allen, Syd Barrett, Terje Rypdal and Manuel Göttsching as some of his major influences. In 1978 he founded Lux, his first band. Lux later became Ultimato in 1981, an instrumental punk jazz/no wave band with the arrival of drummer Cláudio Souza, and later came to be named Zero in 1983, with the entrance of vocalist Guilherme Isnard (Voluntários da Pátria). With Zero, he took part in the recording of the single "Heróis".

In 1985, Golfetti and Souza left Zero and formed alongside Angelo Pastorello the influential psychedelic rock band Violeta de Outono. As of 2016 Violeta de Outono has released 7 studio albums, 2 EPs, 4 videos and 2 live albums.

In 1988 he formed a side project to Violeta de Outono, called The Invisible Opera Company (Tropical Version Brazil); heavily inspired by the aesthetics of Daevid Allen, it has released four albums as of yet.

In 2006 he appeared at the Gong Unconvention 2006 in Amsterdam with The Glissando Guitar Orchestræ. The Seven Drones (At Gong Uncon '06), a live album recording his performance at the event, was released in 2008.

Golfetti is a full-time member of Gong since 2012; he previously toured with them in 2007, during a brief series of concerts in São Paulo, as a member of their "Gong Global Family" project. A live album of the concert was released in 2009. I See You, Gong's first studio album with him as an official member of the band, was released on November 10, 2014.

In 2015 he collaborated with fellow Gong band member Dave Sturt on his second solo album, Dreams and Absurdities.

Over the last six years with Gong, Golfetti and the rest of the band, with the addition of Cheb Nettles on drums, have been reshaping this new embodiment of their sound. In 2016 Gong recorded the album Rejoice! I’m Dead! honoring the influence and legacy of the late Daevid Allen and Gilli Smith. The band have continued to tour internationally since that time including visits to China, Scandinavia, Brasil, Japan. Gong released the new album The Universe Also Collapses, on Kscope music in May 2019.

Also in 2019 Gong was recruited by their original guitarist Steve Hillage to perform a series of concerts in the UK and Europe under the name Steve Hillage Band.

Today, Golfetti is an active member of Gong, continues working with Violeta de Outono, releasing in 2021 the album Lux Æterna : Dream, an electronic ambient project with his son Gabriel of the progressive band Stratus Luna. Also in 2021, released The Frame Of Life with his old fellow Renato Mello.

In 2022 he released a new studio album with Violeta de Outono - Outro Lado and new solo album, Song & Visions, an instrumental ambient jazz journey with the collaborations of Gong & Stratus Luna musicians.

== Discography ==
=== With Violeta de Outono ===
- 1987: Violeta de Outono
- 1989: Em Toda Parte
- 1999: Mulher na Montanha
- 2005: Ilhas
- 2007: Volume 7
- 2012: Espectro
- 2016: Spaces

=== With The Invisible Opera Company (Tropical Version Brazil) ===
- 1991: The Eternal Voice
- 1993: Glissando Spirit
- 1996: Cosmic Dance Co.
- 2010: UFO Planante

=== With Zero ===
- 1985: "Heróis" (single)

=== With Gong ===
- 2009: Live in Brazil: 20 November 2007 (live album)
- 2014: I See You
- 2016: Rejoice! I'm Dead!
- 2019: The Universe Also Collapses
- 2022: Pulsing Signals (live album)
- 2023: Unending Ascending

=== With Dave Sturt ===
- 2015: Dreams and Absurdities

=== Other works ===
- 1994: Angel's Breath (with Angel's Breath)
- 2008: The Seven Drones (At Gong Uncon '06) (with Daevid Allen and The Glissando Guitar Orchestræ)
