= Voiceprint Records =

- Parent company: Gonzo Multimedia, Ltd.
- Founded: 1990
- Founder: Rob Ayling
- Status: Active
- Distributor: Floating World Records
- Genre: Progressive rock; Pop standards; Pop rock
- Country of origin: United Kingdom
- Location: Houghton-le-Spring, Tyne & Wear, England
- Official website: gonzomultimedia.co.uk

Voiceprint Records was a British independent record label based in England, founded in November 1990 by Rob Ayling. They specialised in re-releasing old material, especially progressive rock, but also had new releases, under the Resurgence and Blueprint labels.

The holding company, Zeit Distribution Ltd., went into insolvency in 2010. It was replaced by the phoenix company, Gonzo Multimedia in 2010. The new company has a broader remit, and releases a much wider range of music.

== Labels ==
Voiceprint operated a number of record labels, including some for a single band or set of related artists. Major Voiceprint labels include Blueprint, All Saints, Jazzprint, and Resurgence.

== Artists ==
The first release on Voiceprint was a Daevid Allen album, The Australian Years. Among the many other artists whose recordings have been released by the company are Tim Blake, Leonard Cohen, The Fall (whose Cog Sinister label was acquired by Voiceprint in 1997), Fish, Gong, Hawkwind, Steve Hillage, Patrick Moraz, Anthony Phillips, Theo Travis, Rick Wakeman, Gordon Haskell , and Yes.

The company also released classical music and related documentaries.

== See also ==
- List of record labels
