= Crammed Discs =

Belgian record label

Crammed Discs is an independent record label whose output blends avant-rock, experimental music, pop, global music, and electronica. Based in Brussels, Belgium, Crammed was founded in 1980 by Marc Hollander of Aksak Maboul and has since released over 400 albums and 300 singles, working with artists from all over the world (from Western Europe and the US to the Balkans and North & Central Africa, from South America to the Middle East and Japan).

Crammed Discs is run by Marc Hollander (A&R) with Hanna Gorjaczkowska (artist development, marketing, distribution & art direction) and Vincent Kenis (producer, director of the Congotronics Series).

Crammed has been described as "one of the most boldly eclectic independent labels around" (Pitchfork), as "innovative and groundbreaking" and "visionary", a.o. for steadily avoiding to confine its roster "to one, potentially homogeneous category" and encouraging artists with plural identities to create new forms of music. Marc Hollander and Crammed Discs received the WOMEX award in 2004 at the World Music Expo international music trade fair, for being "one of the seminal players on the world music field". However, the label has always systematically worked with electronic music, indie pop and rock artists, and "doesn't see itself as a world music label: it just happens to enjoy working with artists from around the world, some of whom sing in languages other than English" (as stated in the label's manifesto).

In 2011, Crammed Discs celebrated its 30th anniversary by setting up the Congotronics vs Rockers project, a "superband" including ten Congolese and ten indie rock musicians (including members of Konono No1, Deerhoof, Wildbirds & Peacedrums, Kasai Allstars, Skeletons, Juana Molina and Vincent Kenis), who collaborated to create a common repertoire and performed at 15 major festivals and venues in ten countries.

For the last couple of decades, the label has been working with a series of transnational artists, whose post-genre aesthetics coincides with the directions pursued by Crammed since its inception. From 2008 to 2015, the following artists have joined the Crammed Discs roster: Chicago band Allá, indie pop act Lonely Drifter Karen (from Vienna and Barcelona), London-based Moroccan electronic artist U-cef, Congolese band Staff Benda Bilili, musician/composer/producer Mocky, Belgian band Hoquets, Belgo-Congolese rapper Baloji, Belgian-Colombian band La Chiva Gantiva, French-American artist Maïa Vidal, US bands Skeletons & Megafaun, South African/Dutch band SKIP&DIE, Belgian band Amatorski, Lebanese singer Yasmine Hamdan, Argentinian artist Juana Molina and Ghanaian/Swiss band OY.

The label's signings since 2016 are Parisian electronic music collective Acid Arab, Portuguese singer & musician Lula Pena, young French-Welsh band Fauna Twin, French experimental pop band Aquaserge, Matias Aguayo & The Desdemonas, the new rock band founded by the German-Chilean electronic music producer, Berlin-based Spanish experimental musician Don The Tiger, French-Chilean band Nova Materia, Lagos/London project Ekiti Sound, Ugandan/British band Nihiloxica, Californian musician Scott Gilmore, producer Pascal Gabriel and his new Stubbleman project, German/Peruvian electronic music duo Los Pulpitos, and Palestinian techno duo Zenobia.

== Sub-labels ==
Because of the diversity of the label's output since its early days in the 1980s, its founders chose to create several sub-labels. This policy was discarded during the latter part of the 1990s, because Crammed felt that genre-blending had finally become acceptable.

- Made To Measure A composers' series specializing in instrumental and ambient music, soundtracks and works commissioned for films, ballets etc. Notable artists are: Hector Zazou, Arto Lindsay, John Lurie, Yasuaki Shimizu, Minimal Compact, Daniel Schell & Karo, and Fred Frith. 36 volumes were released between 1984 and 1995.
- SSR Launched in 1988, this electronic music label was A&R'd by DJ Morpheus (a.k.a. Samy Birnbach) and Marc Hollander. 47 albums and numerous singles were released, ranging from early new beat to downtempo, techno, house and hip hop, by artists such as Snooze, Juryman, Carl Craig, Tek 9, DJ Morpheus, Kevin Saunderson and Telex. SSR is short for Sampleur & Sans Reproche.
- Language This 'avant dance' sub-label was A&R'd by Tony Thorpe (a.k.a. The Moody Boyz). 10 albums and 22 singles/EPs were released between 1995 and 1999, by artists including Buckfunk 3000 (Si Begg) and Circadian Rhythms (a band led by ex-This Heat member Charles Bullen).
- Ziriguiboom Launched in 1998 in collaboration with Brazilian A&R/Producer Béco Dranoff, Ziriguiboom's aim was to present original and as-yet-unexposed aspects of Brazilian music to international audiences. It quickly became one of the global hubs for the new wave of Brazilian music, and has brought Crammed its biggest commercial success to date with Bebel Gilberto's debut album Tanto Tempo (which sold one million units worldwide). Ziriguiboom also signed and released albums by artists such as Celso Fonseca, Cibelle, Zuco 103, Trio Mocotó, Bossacucanova, DJ Dolores, Apollo Nove and the late Suba.

Crammed also had several specialized and one-artist sub-labels:

- Cramworld (for contemporary and archival world music releases)
- Selector (specialized in drum and bass)
- Cramboy (for Tuxedomoon's releases)
- Furax (released Belgian comedians Les Snuls)
- The Congotronics Series

Currently the only subsiding Crammed Discs imprints are Congotronics and Made To Measure. Congotrononics is not a sub-label per se, but a collection of releases by Congolese bands who play their own respective styles of electrified traditional music (such as Konono No1 and Kasai Allstars). The series is curated and produced by Vincent Kenis. As for the Made To Measure composers' series, it is being discreetly revived since 2013 (after having remained inactive for 18 years), as 6 new volumes have recently come out.

A new imprint was launched in 2025: CrammedLab, devoted to emerging acts, experimental projects, as well as archival releases. True to its parent company’s ethos, CrammedLab will be exploring various musical directions. CrammedLab is managed by Marc Hollander and Sofia Rasquin.

== Discography (albums) ==
1980

- Aksak Maboul: Un Peu de l'Âme des Bandits, with Chris Cutler and Fred Frith (LP 1980, CD reissue in 1995, vinyl reissue in 2018)

1981

- Aksak Maboul: Onze Danses Pour Combattre la Migraine (originally out in 1977, released on Crammed in 1981, CD reissue in 2003, vinyl reissue in 2015)
- Minimal Compact: Minimal Compact (mini-album, 1981, reissued on CD as part of One+One By One)
- Band Apart: Band Apart (mini-album)
- Family Fodder: Greatest Hits

1982

- The Honeymoon Killers: Les Tueurs de la Lune de Miel
- Des Airs: Lunga Notte (mini-album)
- Hermine: The World On My Plates
- Benjamin Lew/Steven Brown: Douzième Journée: le Verbe, la Parure, l'Amour

1983

- Minimal Compact: One By One (1983, reissued on CD as part of One+One By One)
- Band Apart: Marseille
- Zazou Bikaye+CY1: Noir Et Blanc

1984

- Made To Measure Vol.1, feat. Aksak Maboul, Benjamin Lew, Minimal Compact, Tuxedomoon
- Blaine Reininger/Mikel Rouse: Colorado Suite
- Minimal Compact: Deadly Weapons
- Karl Biscuit: Regrets Eternels (1984, re-released in 2003 as part of Secret Love - Compiled Electropop Works)

1985

- Zazou Bikaye: Mr Manager
- Peter Principle: Sedimental Journey
- Tuxedomoon: Holy Wars
- Minimal Compact: Raging Souls
- Tuxedomoon: Half Mute (originally out on Ralph Records in 1980, reissued on Crammed in 1985)
- Hector Zazou: Géographies
- Karl Biscuit: Fatal Reverie (1985, re-released in 2003 as part of Secret Love - Compiled Electropop Works)
- Nadjma: Rapture In Baghdad, feat. Adrian Sherwood

1986

- Surfin Dave and The Absent Legends: In Search of a Decent Haircut
- Various Artists: Fuck Your Dreams, This Is Heaven, feat. members of Tuxedomoon & Minimal Compact playing covers of 1960s/1970s songs
- Colin Newman: Commercial Suicide
- Tuxedomoon: Desire (originally out on Ralph Records in 1981, re-issued on Crammed in 1986)
- Benjamin Lew/Steven Brown: A propos d'un paysage
- Tuxedomoon: Ship of Fools
- Mikel Rouse: A Walk In The Woods
- John Lurie: Stranger Than Paradise (original soundtrack from the Jim Jarmusch film)
- Mahmoud Ahmed: Ere Mela Mela (originally released 1975-76, released on Crammed Discs in 1986, and re-issued as part of the Ethiopiques series in 2000)
- Hector Zazou: Reivax au Bongo

1987

- Minimal Compact: The Figure One Cuts
- Tuxedomoon: You
- Minimal Compact: Lowlands Flight
- Sussan Deyhim & Richard Horowitz: Desert Equations
- Yasuaki Shimizu: Music For Commercials
- John Lurie: Down By Law (original soundtrack from the Jim Jarmusch film)
- Daniel Schell & Karo: If Windows They Have
- Karen Finley: The Truth Is Hard To Swallow
- Tuxedomoon: Suite en Sous-Sol/Time To Lose/Short Stories (originally out in 1982 and 1983, re-issued on Crammed in 1987)

1988

- Bel Canto: White Out Conditions
- Colin Newman: It Seems
- Sonoko: La Débutante
- Benjamin Lew: Nebka
- Tuxedomoon: Pinheads on the Move

1989

- Minimal Compact: Live
- Zazou Bikaye: Guilty
- Dominic Sonic: Cold Tears
- Peter Principle: Tone Poems
- Samy Birnbach/Benjamin Lew: When God Was Famous
- Various Artists: Sampleur et Sans Reproche (SSR compilation)
- Bleep (a.k.a. Geir Jenssen a.k.a. Biosphere): The North Pole By Submarine

1990

- Bel Canto: Birds Of Passage
- Hector Zazou: Géologies
- Steven Brown/Delphine Seyrig: De doute et de grâce
- Peter Scherer & Arto Lindsay: Pretty Ugly
- Zelwer: La fiancée aux yeux de bois
- Foreign Affair: East On Fire
- Fred Frith: The Top Of His Head
- Gabor G.Kristof: Le cri du lézard
- Steve Shehan: Arrows
- Daniel Schell & Karo: Le Secret de Bwlch
- Tuxedomoon: Divine, soundtrack for a Maurice Béjart ballet (1982, reissued on Crammed in 1990)

1991

- Dominique Dalcan: Entre l'étoile et le carré
- Classic Swede Swede: Toleki Bango (Miles Ahead)
- Taraf de Haïdouks: Musique des Tziganes de Roumanie
- Ramuntcho Matta: Domino One
- Bobvan: Loonychip Classics
- Michel Moers: Fishing Le Kiss
- Seigen Ono: Nekonotopia Nekonomania
- Zap Mama: Zap Mama (retitled Adventures In Afropea for the US release, 1991)
- Hector Zazou: Sahara Blue feat. John Cale, Ryuichi Sakamoto, David Sylvian...

1992

- Bel Canto: Shimmering Warm and Bright
- David Cunningham: Water
- Various Artists: Roots Of Rumba Rock 1 (1953-54) (1992, reissued with vol.2 as a double CD in 2006)
- The Gruesome Twosome (Samy Birnbach & Bertrand Burgalat): Candy For Strangers
- Les Snuls: Les Snuls, bien entendu

1993

- Sainkho (Saynkho Namchylak): Out of Tuva
- Bobvan: Water Dragon
- Various Artists: Roots Of OK Jazz (1993, reissued in 2006)
- Brion Gysin: Self-Portrait Jumping
- Tuxedomoon: Solve et Coagula
- Benjamin Lew: Le Parfum du Raki
- Lone Kent: Granite & Sand
- Avalon: Earth Water Air Fire

1994

- Ramuntcho Matta: 2 l'Amour
- Various Artists: Freezone 1: The Phenomenology Of Ambient (2CD)
- Zap Mama: Sabsylma
- Dominique Dalcan: Cannibale
- Taraf de Haïdouks: Honourable Brigands, Magic Horses & Evil Eye
- Solar Quest: Orgship
- Various Artists: Around The Day in 80 Worlds, compiled by DJ Morpheus a.k.a. Samy Birnbach
- Purna Das Baul & Bauls Of Bengal
- Various Artists: Jungle Vibes
- Various Artists: Renegade Selector

1995

- 4hero Parallel Universe
- John Lurie National Orchestra: Men With Sticks
- Harold Budd & Hector Zazou: Glyph
- Various Artists: Freezone 2: Variations On A Chill, compiled by DJ Morpheus a.k.a. Samy Birnbach (2 CD)
- Various Artists: Miscellaneous (Language compilation)
- Various Artists: Jungle Vibes 2 (Selector compilation)
- Various Artists: Roots Of Rumba Rock 2 (1954-55) (1995, reissued with vol.1 as a double CD in 2006)
- Bio Muse: Wrong
- Zelwer: Les dieux sont fâchés/The Gods Are Angry
- Aural Expansion: Surreal Sheep

1996

- Tek 9: It's Not What You Think It Is !!?!
- Snooze: The Man In The Shadow
- Various Artists: Freezone 3: Horizontal Dancing, 23 exclusives by Herbert, Kruder&Dorfmeister, Carl Craig...(2CD)
- Various Artists: Miscellaneous, The 2nd Edition (Language compilation)
- Endemic Void Equations
- Hugo: La Formule
- Aural Expansion: Remixed Sheep
- Various Artists: Moving House, compiled by DJ Geoffroy a.k.a. Mugwump
- Various Artists: Junglized (Selector compilation)
- Various Artists: The Deepest Shade Of Techno, compiled by 4hero (2CD)
- Ziryab Trio: Mashreq Classics

1997

- Carl Craig More Songs About Food And Revolutionary Art
- Barbara Gogan with Hector Zazou: Made On Earth
- Various Artists: Freezone 4: Dangerous Lullabies, 22 exclusives by Basement Jaxx, Rhythm And Sound, Thievery Corporation...(2CD)
- Juryman vs Spacer: Mail-Order Justice
- Tuxedomoon: The Ghost Sonata (1991, reissued on Crammed in 1997)
- Kočani Orkestar: L'Orient est rouge
- Elixir: Alien Rainbow
- Meira Asher: Dissected
- Qmoog: The Arc Of Blueness
- Subject 13: The Black Steele Project
- Tao: Esoteric Red
- Various Artists: Moving House 2, compiled by DJ Geoffroy a.k.a. Mugwump
- Various Artists: Lysergic Factory, compiled by DJ Morpheus

1998

- Taraf de Haïdouks: Dumbala Dumba
- Buckfunk 3000: First Class Ticket To Telos
- Auto Repeat: The Unbearable Lightness Of Auto-Repeating
- Circadian Rhythms: Internal Clock
- Various Artists: Freezone 5: The Radio Is Teaching My Goldfish Ju-Jitsu, 21 exclusives by Shawn J.Period, Jigmastas, Joe Claussell... (2CD)
- Bossacucanova: Revisited Classics
- Telex: I Don't Like Music, a collection of remixes
- Various Artists: Moving House 3, compiled by DJ Geoffroy a.k.a. Mugwump
- Various Artists: If U Can Beat 'Em, Break 'Em, compiled by DJ Morpheus
- Various Artists: Phax'n'Phixion, The Nu Hip Hop Underground, compiled by DJ Morpheus
- Various Artists: Junglized 2 (Selector compilation)
- Various Artists: The Family Album, exclusive tracks by artists on the Language label
- Kevin Saunderson: Faces & Phases (2CD)

1999

- Telex: I Don't Like Music 2, a collection of remixes
- Meira Asher: Spears Into Hooks
- Various Artists: Freezone 6: Fourth Person Singular, 22 exclusives by Alex Gopher, Stacey Pullen, Mark Pritchard... (2CD)
- Zuco 103: Outro Lado
- Phosphorus: Pillar Of Salt
- Various Artists: Brasil 2mil - The Soul Of Bass-O-Nova
- Suba (Mitar Subotić): São Paulo Confessions
- Niko Marks & Eddie Fowlkes: City Boy Players
- Various Artists: Moving House At Food Club
- Various Artists: Tags Of The Times 2.0
- Various Artists: The Beyond Real Experience, produced and compiled by DJ Spinna
- Various Artists: Electric Kingdom - New Skool Breaks & Electro
- Various Artists If It's Not 100% U.K. Hip Hop You Can Have Your Money Back, compiled by Tony Thorpe & Dave Watts

2000

- Bebel Gilberto: Tanto Tempo
- Sandy Dillon & Hector Zazou: 12 (Las Vegas Is Cursed)
- Tek 9: Simply
- Juryman: The Hill
- Le PM: Les Petits Chefs
- Sussan Deyhim: Madman of God
- Various Artists: In My Bag, compiled by DJ Morpheus

2001

- Taraf de Haïdouks: Band of Gypsies
- Zuco 103: The Other Side of Outro Lado
- Various Artists: Freezone: Seven Is Seven Is, 23 exclusives by Cibelle, Kid Koala, Tim 'Love' Lee... (2CD)
- Trio Mocotó: Samba Rock
- Various Artists: Samba Soul 70
- Snooze: Goingmobile
- Bossacucanova: Brasilidade
- Bebel Gilberto: Tanto Tempo Remixes

2002

- Kočani Orkestar: Alone at my Wedding
- Suba (Mitar Subotić): Tributo
- Zuco 103: Tales of High Fever
- Juryman: Escape To Where
- Sussan Deyhim/Bill Laswell: Shy Angels
- Various Artists: Ziriguiboom: The Now Sound Of Brazil

2003

- Electric Gypsyland 1 (Taraf de Haïdouks and Kočani Orkestar reinterpreted by Señor Coconut, Mercan Dede, Arto Lindsay & more)
- Cibelle: Cibelle
- Celso Fonseca: Natural
- Benjamin Lew: Compiled Electronic Landscapes
- Zuco 103: One Down, One Up (2CD)

2004

- Bebel Gilberto: Bebel Gilberto
- Tuxedomoon: Cabin In The Sky
- Tuxedomoon: Seismic Riffs (DVD)
- Mahala Rai Banda: Mahala Rai Banda
- Trio Mocotó: Beleza! Beleza!! Beleza!!!
- Bossacucanova: Uma Batida Diferente
- Konono Nº1: Congotronics
- Minimal Compact: Returning Wheel (3-CD box set, including new remixes and rarities)

2005

- Celso Fonseca: Rive Gauche Rio
- Bebel Gilberto: Bebel Gilberto Remixed
- Apollo Nove: Res Inexplicata Volans feat. Cibelle, Seu Jorge etc.
- DJ Dolores: Aparelhagem
- Zuco 103: Whaa!
- Cibelle: About A Girl EP (CD/DVD dualdisc)
- Various Artists: Ziriguiboom: The Now Sound Of Brazil 2
- Taraf de Haïdouks: The Continuing Adventures Of... (DVD+CD)
- Congotronics 2, Buzz'n'Rumble in the Urb'n'Jungle, feat. Konono No.1, Kasai Allstars, Basokin... (CD+DVD)

2006

- Tartit Abacabok
- Think Of One: Trafico
- Cibelle:The Shine Of Dried Electric Leaves
- Electric Gypsyland 2 (Taraf de Haïdouks et al., reinterpreted by Tunng, Animal Collective, Nouvelle Vague, Susheela Raman & more)
- Tuxedomoon: Bardo Hotel Soundtrack
- Hugo: La Nuit des Balançoires
- Wise In Time: The Ballad of Den The Men
- Various Artists: Roots Of Rumba Rock 1+2 (1953–55) (originally out in 1992 and 1995, reissued as a 2CD in 2006)

2007

- Tuxedomoon: Vapour Trails
- Tuxedomoon: 77o7 TM (The 30th Anniversary Box) (3CD+1DVD)
- Bebel Gilberto: Momento
- Taraf de Haïdouks: Maskarada
- Flat Earth Society: Psychoscout
- Balkan Beat Box: Nu Med
- Think Of One: Camping Shaabi
- Shantel Disko Partizani!
- Konono Nº1: Live At Couleur Cafe
- Various Artists: Sex & The Single Rabbit (a 2-volume compilation of Crammed electronic music tracks, digital-only)

2008

- Kasai Allstars In The 7th Moon, The Chief Turned Into A Swimming Fish...
- Kočani Orkestar: The Ravished Bride
- DJ Dolores: 1 Real
- Allá Es Tiempo
- Balkan Beat Box: Nu-Made (CD+DVD)
- Lonely Drifter Karen Grass Is Singing
- U-cef: Halalwood
- Hector Zazou & Swara: In The House Of Mirrors

2009

- Staff Benda Bilili Tres Tres Fort
- Bossacucanova: Ao Vivo (DVD+CD)
- Mocky Saskamodie
- Shantel:Planet Paprika
- Chicha Libre: Sonido Amazonico!
- Les Tueurs de la lune de miel (a.k.a. The Honeymoon Killers): Special Manubre (originally out in 1977, reissued in 2009)
- Akron/Family Set 'Em Wild, Set 'Em Free
- Megafaun Gather, Form & Fly
- Flat Earth Society: Cheer Me, Perverts
- Zeep People & Things

2010

- Konono N°1 Assume Crash Position
- Lonely Drifter Karen: Fall Of Spring
- Balkan Beat Box: Blue Eyed Black Boy
- Cibelle: Las Venus Resort Palace Hotel
- Axel Krygier: Pesebre
- Various Artists: The Roots Of Chicha 2
- Radioclit Presents: The Sound Of Club Secousse (African Dance Music Anthems)
- Tradi-Mods vs Rockers: Alternative Takes on Congotronics feat. Deerhoof, Andrew Bird, Juana Molina, Micachu, Glenn Kotche & more (2CD)
- Megafaun: Heretofore

2011

- Skeletons: People
- Taraf de Haïdouks & Kočani Orkestar: Band of Gypsies 2
- Hoquets: Belgotronics
- Various Artists: The Karindula Sessions (CD+DVD)
- Tuxedomoon: Unearthed, previously unreleased music and videos (CD+DVD)
- Megafaun: Megafaun
- The Real Tuesday Weld: The Last Werewolf
- La Chiva Gantiva: Pelao
- Maïa Vidal: God Is My Bike
- Baloji: Kinshasa Succursale

2012

- Zita Swoon Group: Wait For Me
- Lonely Drifter Karen: Poles
- Balkan Beat Box: Give
- Jagwa Music: Bongo Hotheads
- Chicha Libre: Canibalismo
- Staff Benda Bilili: Bouger Le Monde
- SKIP&DIE: Riots In The Jungle

2013

- Amatorski: TBC (+ Same Stars We Shared)
- Maïa Vidal: Spaces
- NYNKE: Alter
- Yasmine Hamdan: Ya Nass
- Cibelle : ∆UNBINDING∆
- SKIP&DIE : Remixed Riots
- Amatorski : re:tbc
- Brown Reininger Bodson : Clear Tears | Troubled Waters (features Steven Brown, Blaine L. Reininger and Maxime Bodson)
- Juana Molina : Wed 21

2014

- La Chiva Gantiva: Vivo
- OY: No Problem Saloon
- Amatorski: from clay to figures
- Tuxedomoon: Pink Narcissus
- Kasai Allstars: Beware The Fetish
- Juana Molina: Segundo (re-issue - originally out in 2000)
- Juana Molina: Tres Cosas (re-issue - originally out in 2002)
- Juana Molina: Son (re-issue - originally out in 2006)
- Juana Molina: Un día (re-issue - originally out in 2008)
- Chancha Via Circuito: Amansara
- Véronique Vincent & Aksak Maboul: Ex-Futur Album
- Jozef Van Wissem: It Is Time For You To Return

2015

- Taraf de Haïdouks: Of Lovers, Gamblers and Parachute Skirts
- Axel Krygier: Hombre de piedra
- SKIP&DIE: Cosmic Serpents
- Bérangère Maximin: Dangerous Orbits
- Soapkills: The Best of Soapkills
- Maïa Vidal: You're The Waves
- Tuxedomoon & Cult With No Name: Blue Velvet Revisited
- Tuxedomoon: The Vinyl Box (retrospective, 10-LP boxed set)

2016

- Konono N°1: Konono N°1 meets Batida
- Various Artists: Give Me New Noise: Half-Mute Revisited
- Véronique Vincent & Aksak Maboul: Je pleure tout le temps EP (reworks & remixes)
- OY: Space Diaspora
- Acid Arab: Musique de France
- Aquaserge: Guerre EP
- Fauna Twin: The Hydra EP
- Véronique Vincent & Aksak Maboul: 16 Visions of Ex-Futur (covers & reworks, feat. Jaakko Eino Kalevi, Aquaserge, Laetitia Sadier, Forever Pavot, Flavien Berger, Nite Jewel, Bullion, Burnt Friedman, Hello Skinny, Marc Collin, Bérangère Maximin, Lena Willikens and Aksak Maboul)

2017

- Lula Pena: Archivo Pittoresco
- Aquaserge: Laisse ça être
- Le Ton Mité: Passé composé futur conditionnel
- Yasmine Hamdan: Al Jamilat
- Kasai Allstars: Around Félicité
- Juana Molina: Halo
- Matias Aguayo & The Desdemonas: Sofarnopolis
- Juana Molina: Un día (vinyl release)
- Yasuaki Shimizu: Music For Commercials (vinyl reissue)
- Zazou Bikaye CY1: Noir et Blanc (vinyl reissue)

2018

- Aksak Maboul: Un peu de l'âme des bandits (vinyl reissue)
- Aquaserge: Déjà-vous?
- Lio: Lio canta Caymmi
- Yasmine Hamdan: Jamilat Reprise
- Nova Materia: It Comes
- Don The Tiger: Matanzas

2019

- Scott Gilmore: Two Roomed Motel
- Ekiti Sound: Abeg No Vex
- Stubbleman: Mountains And Plains
- Band Apart: Band Apart (vinyl reissue)
- Matias Aguayo: Support Alien Invasion
- Juana Molina: Forfun EP
- Zap Mama: Adventures in Afropea (vinyl reissue)
- Various Artists: Kinshasa 1978 (Originals & Reconstructions) - feat. Konono No.1, Sankayi, Martin Meissonnier

2020

- Doctor Fluorescent: Doctor Fluorescent (feat. Scott Gilmore & Eddie Ruscha)
- Aksak Maboul: Figures
- Zenobia: Halak, Halak
- Nihiloxica: Kaloli
- Ekiti Sound: Abeg No Vex Remixes vol.1 (digital EP)
- Stubbleman: The Blackbird Tapes (digital EP)
- Nova Materia: Live At Home (digital EP)

2021

- Ikoqwe (Batida & Ikonoklasta
- Kasai Allstars: Black Ants Always Fly Together...
- Nova Materia: Xpujil
- Aquaserge: The Possibility of a New Work for Aquaserge
- Aksak Maboul: Redrawn Figures 1 and Redrawn Figures 2

2022

- Steven Brown: El Hombre Invisible
- Congotronics International: Where's The One?
- Various Artists: Fictions (Made To Measure Vol.47) feat. Kaitlyn Aurelia Smith, Mary Lattimore etc
- Batida: Neon Colonialismo

2023

- Acid Arab: Trois
- Aksak Maboul: Une aventure de VV (songspiel)
- Ensemble 0: Jojoni
- Ekiti Sound: Drum Money
- Nihiloxica: Source of Denial

2024

- Amatorski: Curves and Bends, Things Veer
- Aquaserge: Le fin de l'économie

2025

- Stubbleman: 1:46:43 - The Ventoux Trilogy
- Yasmine Hamdan: I Remember I Forget
- Los Pulpitos: Octopean Union EP
- Aksak Maboul: Before Aksak Maboul (documents & experiments 1969-1977)
- Duid: Let's Duid

Crammed Samplers

- It's A Crammed, Crammed World 1 (LP, 1984)
- It's A Crammed, Crammed World 2 (LP, 1987)
- The World According To Crammed (CD, 1993)
- Crammed Global Soundclash 80-89 (2 separate CDs, or box set including bonus material, 2003)
- 20 Ways To Float Through Walls, a selection of tracks released between 2001 & 2007 (CD, 2007)
- It's A Crammed, Crammed World 3, tracks from 2008/2009 (CD, 2009)
- Crammed Walks With The Animals, tracks with titles containing animal names (CD, 2011)
- Crammed Goes To The Movies, tracks from or inspired by films (CD, 2011)

== Awards and nominations ==
Awards

- Grammy Award for Best Pop Collaboration (USA): Konono No1 (with Herbie Hancock) (2011)
- Songlines Award for Best Group (UK): Staff Benda Bilili (2010)
- Womex Artist Award of the Year: Staff Benda Bilili (2009)
- Womex/World Music Charts Europe (EBU) Label Of The Year: Crammed Discs (2009)
- BBC Awards for World Music (UK): Konono No1 (2006)
- BBC Awards for World Music (UK): Shantel (2006)
- Edison Award (The Netherlands): Taraf de Haïdouks (2006)
- World Music Charts Europe (EBU) Label Of The Year: Crammed Discs (2005)
- Womex Award of the Year: Marc Hollander and Crammed Discs (2004)
- BBC Awards for World Music (UK): Think Of One (2004)
- Mobo Award (Music Of Black Origin) (UK): Bebel Gilberto (2004)
- BBC Awards for World Music (UK): Taraf de Haïdouks (2002)
- Edison Award (The Netherlands): Zelwer (1991)

Nominations

- Grammy Awards (USA): Konono No1 (2007)
- Grammy Awards (USA): Bebel Gilberto (2001, 2004 and 2007)
- Impala Awards (Pan-European Indie Awards): Maïa Vidal (2011)
- UK Music Video Awards: Maïa Vidal (2012)

== Crammed Discs artists (past and present) ==
- 4hero
- Akron/Family
- Acid Arab
- Aksak Maboul
- Allá
- Amatorski
- Apollo Nove
- Aquaserge
- Auto Repeat
- Axel Krygier
- Balkan Beat Box
- Batida
- Baloji
- Bebel Gilberto
- Bel Canto
- Benjamin Lew
- Bérangère Maximin
- Bio Muse
- Karl Biscuit
- Bobvan
- Bossacucanova
- Buckfunk 3000
- Carl Craig
- Celso Fonseca
- Chancha Via Circuito
- Chicha Libre
- Cibelle
- Circadian Rhythms
- Colin Newman (Wire)
- Congotronics International
- Cult With No Name
- Daniel Schell
- DJ Dolores
- DJ Morpheus
- Dominic Sonic
- Don The Tiger
- Ekiti Sound
- Ensemble 0
- Family Fodder
- Fauna Twin
- Flat Earth Society
- Fred Frith
- Hector Zazou
- Hermine Demoriane
- Hoquets
- Hugo
- Jagwa Music
- Jozef Van Wissem
- Juana Molina
- Juryman / Ian Simmonds
- Kasai Allstars
- Koçani Orkestar
- Konono n°1
- La Chiva Gantiva
- Le PM
- Lonely Drifter Karen
- Los Pulpitos
- Lula Pena
- John Lurie
- Juana Molina
- Mahala Rai Banda
- Maïa Vidal
- Matias Aguayo & The Desdemonas
- Megafaun
- Meira Asher
- Minimal Compact
- Mocky
- Nynke Laverman
- Nova Materia
- Nihiloxica
- OY
- Peter Principle
- Qmoog
- Ramuntcho Matta
- Scott Gilmore
- Shantel
- Skeletons
- Skip&Die
- Snooze/ Dominique Dalcan
- Sonoko
- Staff Benda Bilili
- Steven Brown
- Stubbleman / (Pascal Gabriel)
- Suba
- Sussan Deyhim
- Taraf de Haïdouks
- Tartit
- Tek 9
- Telex
- The Gruesome Twosome
- The Honeymoon Killers (les Tueurs de la Lune de Miel)
- The Moody Boyz
- The Real Tuesday Weld
- Think Of One
- Trio Mocoto
- Tuxedomoon
- U-cef
- Véronique Vincent & Aksak Maboul
- Wise In Time
- Yasmine Hamdan
- Zap Mama
- Zeep
- Zelwer
- Zenobia
- Zita Swoon Group
- Zuco 103
