= Sahara Blue =

1992 studio album by Hector Zazou

Studio album by Hector Zazou
- Released: 1992
- Studios: Studio Davout (Paris); Daylight (Brussels); Jet (Brussels); Skyline (New York City); Greenpoint (Brooklyn)
- Genre: Ambient music
- Length: 61:29
- Label: Crammed Discs
- Producer: Hector Zazou

Hector Zazou chronology
Les Nouvelles Polyphonies Corses (1991)	Sahara Blue (1992)	Chansons des mers froides (1994)

Professional ratings
Review scores
Source	Rating
AllMusic	4.5/5 stars

Sahara Blue is a 1992 concept album produced by French composer and record producer Hector Zazou. The album commemorated the 100th year of the death of French poet Arthur Rimbaud and included collaborative musical works by John Cale, Khaled, Ryuichi Sakamoto, Tim Simenon, and David Sylvian.

== Track listing ==
1. "I'll Strangle You" (Lyrics: Rimbaud, Music: Anneli Drecker, Bill Laswell, Hector Zazou, spoken word: Gérard Depardieu & Anneli Drecker)
2. "First Evening" (Lyrics: Rimbaud, Music: Kent Condon, John Cale, Hector Zazou)
3. Ophelie (Music: David Sylvian) (feat. Dominique Dalcan & Ryuichi Sakamoto)
4. Lines (feat. Barbara Gogan)
5. Youth (feat. Lisa Gerrard & Brendan Perry)
6. Hapolot Kenym (feat. Sussan Deyhim, Samy Birnbach & Ryuichi Sakamoto)
7. Hunger (feat. John Cale & Vincent Kenis)
8. Sahara Blue (feat. Barbara Gogan)
9. Amdyaz (feat. Khaled & Malka Spigel)
10. Black Stream (feat. Lisa Gerrard & Brendan Perry)
11. Harar et les Gallas (feat. Ketema Mekonn & Ryuichi Sakamoto)
12. Lettre Au Directeur Des Messageries Maritimes (feat. Richard Bohringer, Sussan Deyhim & Bill Laswell)

== Personnel ==
- Samy Birnbach - Vocals
- Richard Bohringer - Vocals, Voices
- John Cale - Vocals
- Kent Condon - Guitar
- Dominique Dalcan - Chant
- Gérard Depardieu - Vocals, Voices
- Sussan Deyhim - Vocals, Voices
- Anneli Marian Drecker - Vocals, Voices
- Yuka Fujii - Walkie Talkie
- Lisa Gerrard - Vocals, Yang Chin
- Barbara Gogan - Vocals
- Kerry Hopwood - MIDI, Programming
- Kenji Jammer - Guitar, Guitar Effects
- Vincent Kenis - Bass, Guitar
- Nabil Khalidi - Oud
- Bill Laswell - Bass, Beats, Effects
- Keith LeBlanc - Percussion
- Christian Lechevretel - Arranger, Clavier, Organ, Trombone, Trumpet
- Lightwave - Electronic Percussion, Special Effects, Synthesizer
- Daniel Manzanas - Guitar (Acoustic)
- Denis Moulin - Guitar, Percussion
- Mr. X - Guitar, Vocals, Walkie Talkie
- Brendan Perry - Bodhran, Darbouka, Engineer, Percussion, Synthesizer, Tin Whistle, Vocals
- Renaud Pion - Clarinet, Flute (Bass), Saxophone
- Ryuichi Sakamoto - Piano
- Steve Shehan - Percussion
- Guy Sigsworth - Keyboards
- Tim Simenon - Beats, Mixing, Producer, Sample Programming
- Malka Spigel - Vocals, Voices
- Matt Stein - Loops, Programming
- David Sylvian - Guitar, Vocals, Walkie Talkie
- Hector Zazou - Clavier, Electronics, Guitar, Keyboards, Mixing, Producer, Sampled Guitar, Sampling, Synthesizer
