= Hector Zazou =

French composer and record producer (1948–2008)

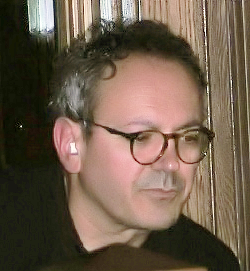
- Zazou in 2006

Background information
- Born: Pierre Job; 11 July 1948; Sidi Bel Abbès, Algeria (when Algeria was still a French colony)
- Origin: Algeria
- Died: 8 September 2008 (aged 60) Paris, France
- Genres: World music, alternative music
- Occupations: Composer; record producer
- Labels: Columbia; SME Records; TriStar Music; SME Records
- Formerly of: ZNR

Pierre Job known professionally as Hector Zazou (11 July 1948 – 8 September 2008) was a French composer, arranger and record producer who collaborated with an international array of singers, inviting the likes of John Cale, Laurie Anderson, Siouxsie Sioux, Ryuichi Sakamoto, Jane Siberry, Björk, David Sylvian and Suzanne Vega.

His collaboration with singer Bikaye on 1983's album Noir et blanc fused African music with electronica. He kept on exploring and mixing music genres with world music through his solo projects: his 1994 album Songs from the Cold Seas was critically acclaimed and garnered media attention in the US upon release.

== Biography ==
Pierre Job was born in a "pieds-noirs" family (French citizens living in Algeria when Algeria was still a French colony - his father was French and his mother was Spanish). His father was a teacher. In 1962 his family moved to Marseille, France.

He chose the name Hector Zazou, when he first came to international attention as part of ZNR, a duo with Joseph Racaille, where both played electric keyboards. Their 1976 debut album Barricade 3 was notable for its "strong Satie influence, stripped to minimal essentials, everything counts".

Zazou's Long-time collaborators included trumpeter Mark Isham; guitarist Lone Kent; cellist and singer Caroline Lavelle; trumpeter Christian Lechevretel, who appeared on all of his albums after Sahara Blue; clarinetist and flutist Renaud Pion, who appeared on all of his albums since his record production work with Les Nouvelles Polyphonies Corses in 1991. He also often worked with drummer Bill Rieflin and Japanese recording artist Ryuichi Sakamoto.

His discography demonstrated his affinity for cross-cultural collaborations, and incorporated modern techniques and sounds in re-recordings of traditional material.

His groundbreaking 1983 album Noir et blanc with Congolese singer Bony Bikaye released under the banner "Zazou/Bikaye", garnered a lot of international attention, and is widely recognized as one of the earliest and most impressive experiments in fusing African music and electronica.

Zazou regarded his work during the 1980s as his time of apprenticeship in the studio. On his 1986 solo album, Reivax au Bongo, he experimented with fusing classical vocals with an electronic backdrop. On his 1989 solo album, Géologies, he combined electronic music with a string quartet.

The albums that he released under his own name from the 1990s onwards were usually concept albums that drew from literary or folk sources and revolve around a specific theme. The collection of songs on each album assembled contributions from a diverse and global range of pop, folk, world music, avant-garde, and classical recording acts.

Zazou's 1992 offering, Sahara Blue, was based on an idea by Jacques Pasquier. Pasquier suggested Zazou commemorate the 100th anniversary of the death of author Arthur Rimbaud by setting music to Rimbaud's poetry. Contributions included spoken word from Gérard Depardieu, Dominique Dalcan and music by Brendan Perry and Lisa Gerrard of Dead Can Dance, Tim Simenon, and David Sylvian. He even adapted a traditional Ethiopian song.

In 1994, he released the critically acclaimed album, Songs from the Cold Seas (issued in Europe as Chansons des mers froides). The album was based on ocean-themed traditional folk songs from northern countries, such as Canada, Finland, Iceland, and Japan. Songs from the Cold Seas featured vocals by pop and rock artists such as Björk, Suzanne Vega, John Cale, Värttina, Jane Siberry, and Siouxsie Sioux in addition to recordings of shamanic incantations and lullabies from Ainu, Nanai, Inuit, and Yakut singers. Musicians included Mark Isham, Brendan Perry, Budgie and the Balanescu Quartet. A cameraman accompanied Zazou on the project and they shot and recorded in Alaska, Canada, Greenland, Japan, Scandinavia, and Siberia. The single "The Long Voyage" was a duet by "John Cale and Suzanne Vega": a second CD single featured remixes by Mad Professor.

His 1998 album, Lights in the Dark, showcased ancient Celtic music sung by Irish singers.

Zazou's released a collaborative album Las Vegas Is Cursed with Sandy Dillon. In the book "Sonora Portraits 2", which accompanies the CD Strong Currents, Zazou said that 12 (Las Vegas Is Cursed) was his most elaborate album. He describes it as a work of black humour and regards his instrumental composition "Sombre" on the album as one of his best songs ever.

Strong Currents was released in 2003 and featured an all-female vocal cast which included Laurie Anderson, Lori Carson, Lisa Germano, Irene Grandi, Nina Hynes, Jane Birkin, and Caroline Lavelle. Musicians included Ryuichi Sakamoto, Dennis Rea, Bill Rieflin and Archaea Strings. The album took six years to complete.

In 2004 Zazou released a companion CD of sorts, L'absence, which included instrumentals, many of the same female vocalists that were featured on Strong Currents, and one male vocalist, French singer Edo.

Zazou was a member of the musical collective named Slow Music. The lineup also included Robert Fripp and Peter Buck on guitars, Fred Chalenor on bass, Matt Chamberlain on drums, and Bill Rieflin on keyboards and percussion. He contributed electronics to the group's music. At the same time, he was exploring other electronic music in other work, including a soundtrack for Carl Theodor Dreyer's silent film La passion de Jeanne d’Arc and the multimedia collaboration released as a CD in 2006, Quadri+Chromies.

Zazou's last projects were documented on the Music Operator interactive multimedia web site, which graphically documented his collaborations while in the background his music was played. In January 2008 Zazou released his Corps électriques album, featuring "one of the original riot grrrls" KatieJane Garside, Bill Rieflin, Lone Kent and nu-jazz trumpeter Nils Petter Molvær.

The last project he worked on was an album entitled In the House of Mirrors, on Crammed Discs, in which he offered a new take on classical Asian music, subtly reprocessed with a nod to some of the music produced in the 1970s by Terry Riley and Fripp & Eno. In the House of Mirrors was recorded in Mumbai with the collaboration of four outstanding instrumentalists from India and Uzbekistan, as well as guests such as Diego Amador and Nils Petter Molvær. This album came out only a few weeks following his death in September 2008.

== Discography ==
=== Albums ===
In Solo

- 1984 Géographies (Crammed/Made to Measure Vol. 5)
- 1985 Reivax au Bongo (Crammed/MTM 2)
- 1989 Géologies (Crammed/MTM 20)
- 1989 Géographies / 13 proverbes Africains (Crammed/MTM 5, CD-reissue)
- 1992 Sahara Blue (Crammed/MTM 32)
  - Lead vocalists: Samy Birnbach, Richard Bohringer, John Cale, Dominique Dalcan, Sussan Deyhim, Lisa Gerrard and Brendan Perry of Dead Can Dance, Gérard Depardieu, Anneli Drecker, Barbara Gogan, Khaled, Ketema Mekonn, Malka Spigel, David Sylvian (as "Mr. X")
  - Contributors: Kent Condon, Yuka Fujii, Kenji Jammer, Vincent Kenis, Nabil Khalidi, Bill Laswell, Christian Lechevretel, Keith Leblanc, Lightwave, Gilles Martin, Denis Moulin, Renaud Pion, Ryuichi Sakamoto, Steve Shehan, Guy Sigsworth, Tim Simenon, Elizabeth Valetti, Daniel Yvinec, Mr. X
- 1994 Songs from the Cold Seas (Chansons des mers froides) (Columbia)
  - Lead vocalists: Björk, John Cale, Tokiko Kato, Lioudmila Khandi, Kilabuk & Nooveya, Catherine-Ann MacPhee, Wimme Saari, Jane Siberry, Siouxsie Sioux, Värttina, Suzanne Vega, Lena Willemark
  - Contributors: Ainu dancers of Hokkaidō, Balanescu Quartet, Budgie, Tchotghtguerele Chalchin, Barbara Gogan, Mark Isham, Lightwave, Sargo Maianagacheva, Demnine Ngamtovsovo, Brendan Perry, Marc Ribot, Sakharine Percussion Group, Noriko Sanagi, Sissimut Dance Drummers, Angelin Tytot
- 1998 Lights in the Dark (Warner Music France)
  - Lead vocalists: Breda Mayock, Katie McMahon, and Lasairfhiona Ni Chonaola.
  - Contributors: Pierre d'Aquin, John B., Richard Bourreau, André Compostel, Kent Condon, Francoise Debout, Papa D'jabate, Peter Gabriel, Mark Isham, Caroline Lavelle, Lucie de Lisieu, Germain de Loing, Denis Mc Ardle, Didier Malherbe, Kristen Noguez, Carlos Núñez, Brendan Perry, Hossam Ramzay, Minna Raskinen, Thierry Robin, Ryuichi Sakamoto, Noriko Sanagi, Silap' (choir), Ivan Tchekine, The Wiltshire Souls, and Daniel Yvinec.
- 2003 Strong Currents (Materiali Sonori)
  - Lead vocalists: Laurie Anderson, Jane Birkin, Lori Carson, Melanie Gabriel, Lisa Germano, Irene Grandi, Nicola Hitchcock, Nina Hynes, Caroline Lavelle, Sarah Jane Morris, Catherine Russell, Emma Stow
  - Contributors: Archaea Strings, Stefano Bollani, Pierre Chaze, Mathias Desmiers, Lone Kent, Carlos Núñez, Renaud Pion, Dennis Rea, Bill Rieflin, Ryuichi Sakamoto
- 2004 L'absence (Taktic)
  - Lead vocalists: Asia Argento, Katrina Beckford, Lucrezia von Berger, Edo, Nicola Hitchcock, Caroline Lavelle, Laurence Revey, Emma Stow

With ZNR

- 1976 - Barricades 3 (Isadora)
- 1978 – Traité de mécanique populaire (Scopa Invisible)

As Jeanne Folly, J.L Hennig, VXZ 375, Hektor Zazou, Bazooka

- 1979 La perversita (Scopa Invisible)

As Zazou / Bikaye

- 1983 – Noir et blanc (Crammed, CD-reissue with extra tracks, 1990)
- 1985 – Mr. Manager (Crammed/Pow Wow)
- 1988 – Guilty! (Crammed)

As Harold Budd / Hector Zazou

- 1995 – Glyph (Crammed/MTM 37)

As Sandy Dillon & Hector Zazou

- 2000 – 12 (Las Vegas Is Cursed) (Crammed/First World)

As Hector Zazou and Bernard Caillaud

- 2006 – Quadri+Chromies (CD and DVD, Materiali Sonori/Taktic)

With Slow Music Project

- 2006 - one live CD, and several live downloads on the King Crimson website DGMLive.com

As Hector Zazou / KatieJane Garside

- 2008 – Corps électriques (Signature)
  - Contributors: Bill Rieflin, Lone Kent and Nils Petter Molvær

As Hector Zazou & Swara

- 2008 - In the House of Mirrors (Crammed)

As Hector Zazou, Barbara Eramo and Stefano Saletti

- 2010 – Oriental Night Fever – published by Materiali Sonori and licensed by Naïve Records

As Eva Quartet & Hector Zazou

- 2011 – The Arch (Elen Music)

=== Singles ===
- 1983 Hector Zazou / Papa Wemba -Malimba (12" single, Crammed)
- 1984 Zazou / Bikaye / CY1 – M'Pasi Ya M'Pamba (12" single, Crammed)
- 1985 Zazou / Bikaye – Mr. Manager (7" and 12" singles, Crammed)
- 1988 Zazou / Bikaye – Guilty! / Na Kenda (12" single, Crammed)
- 1990 Zazou / Bikaye – Get Back (Longwa) (12" single, SSR/Crammed)
- 1992 "I'll Strangle You" featuring Anneli Drecker and Gérard Depardieu (Crammed)
- 1992 "Sahara Blue (Trois inédits)" featuring Ryuichi Sakamoto, Barbara Gogan, and Steven Brown of (Tuxedomoon) (Columbia)
- 1995 "The Long Voyage" featuring John Cale and Suzanne Vega (Columbia)
- 1996 Hector Zazou & Harold Budd – Glyph Remixes with remixes by Herbert, Phume, and The Solid Doctor (12", SSR/Crammed)

=== Film soundtracks ===
- Pygmées (1986), Regie: Raymond Adam
- Driving Me Crazy (1988), Regie: Nick Broomfield
- Der lange Schatten der Melancholie (1994), Regie: Susanne Freund
- Enquête sur le monde invisible (2002), Regie: Jean-Michel Roux
- Djanta (2007), Regie: Tassere Ouédraogo

=== As record producer for other acts ===
- 1991 Les Nouvelles Polyphonies Corses with Hector Zazou – Les Nouvelles Polyphonies Corses (Phonogram France)
- 1991 Various Artists – Nunc Musics (Taktic, compilation with two tracks by Zazou)
- 1993 Sainkho – Out of Tuva (Crammed)
- 1994 Penta Leslee Swanson – Sorrow and Solitude (ErdenKlang)
- 1997 Barbara Gogan with Hector Zazou – Made on Earth (Crammed)
- 1998 Mimi – Soak (Luaka Bop, four tracks produced by Zazou)
- 1999 Carlos Núñez – Os amores libres (BMG)
- 1999 Laurence Revey – Le creux des fées (Naïve)
- 2001 Arlo Bigazzi / Claudio Chianura / Lance Henson – Drop 6 — The Wolf and the Moon (Materiali Sonori compilation, including "The Abandoned Piano (War Version)" by Zazou with William Orbit)
- 2001 Anne Grete Preus – Alfabet (WEA, Zazou produced two tracks)
- 2002 PGR – Per grazia ricevuta (Mercury)
- 2003 Sevara Nazarkhan – Yol Bolsin (Real World)

== Videography ==
- The Long Voyage, Hector Zazou with Suzanne Vega and John Cale (1994) Director: Hector Zazou
- Scott Walker: 30 Century Man (2006) Dokumentary about Scott Walker as Zazou himself.
