= God Is My Bike =

Album by Maïa Vidal

Studio album by Maïa Vidal
- Released: 28 October 2011 in Europe; 30 October 2012 in the US
- Genre: Alternative folk
- Label: Crammed Discs
- Producer: Giuliano Gius Cobelli

Maïa Vidal chronology
God Is My Bike (2011)	Maïa Vidal (EP) (2011)

God Is My Bike is the debut album by Maïa Vidal, released 28 October 2011 in Europe on the Crammed Discs label. The album was made available in the United States iTunes Store on 30 October 2012.

== Track listing ==
Source: iTunes Store UK

No.	Title	Writer(s)	Length
1.	"The Waltz of the Tick Tock of Time"	Maïa Vidal	3:04
2.	"The Alphabet of My Phobias"	Maïa Vidal	3:12
3.	"God is my Bike"	Maïa Vidal	5:04
4.	"La Jaula Dorada"	Maïa Vidal	4:50
5.	"Follow Me"	Maïa Vidal	3:19
6.	"Le Tango de la femme abandonnée"	Maïa Vidal	4:58
7.	"Love Song"	Maïa Vidal	4:00
8.	"Poetry"	Maïa Vidal	2:37
9.	"I'll Sail All Night"	Maïa Vidal	1:52
10.	"It's Quite Alright"	Tim Armstrong (Rancid cover)	2:35
11.	"Je suis tranquille"	Maïa Vidal	5:06
12.	"The Waltz (Instrumental)"	Maïa Vidal	2:30

== Critical reception ==
Professional ratings
Review scores
Source	Rating
Benzine Magazine (France)	4/5 stars
FolkWorld (Germany)	positive

The album has been praised by critics. Denis Zorgniotti writing for France's Benzine Magazine opened his review by declaring that it is impossible to resist the charm which emanates from God Is My Bike, and that Maïa Vidal projects a unique melodic freshness, and that she is assured of a great musical career. Eelco Schilder writing for the German webzine FolkWorld said: "Vidal shows with this CD to be a fantastic singer, composer and musician. She has this bit airy, folk voice and fits with her compositions that are full of small sounds and nice alternative arrangements, in the more commercial orientated new-folk movement."
