= Maïa Vidal =

American singer-songwriter

Maia Vidal
- Born: Maia Vidal; February 20, 1988 (age 38); Santa Barbara, California
- Origin: Ithaca, New York
- Genres: Indie, Chanson, Toy Folk
- Occupations: Singer, songwriter, arranger, visual artist
- Instruments: voice, accordion, violin, clarinet, toy piano
- Years active: 2004–present
- Label: Crammed Discs
- Website: maiavidal.com

Maïa Vidal (born February 20, 1988) is an American-born composer, songwriter, musician, and visual artist. Currently based in Europe (primarily Barcelona and Paris), she has toured in Europe, Canada, Japan, and the United States.

== Biography ==
Maïa Vidal was born in Santa Barbara, California, moved at an early age to Brooklyn, New York, and then to Ithaca, New York where she began studying violin. She started her first band, an all-girl punk group, while a student at Ithaca High School. Her band, Kiev (later changed to Kievan Rus to avoid name conflicts with a California band of the same name), played in two Warped Tour events, and toured briefly with Bad Religion, Anti-Flag, and Gogol Bordello. Bad Religion's Greg Graffin took an early interest in the band, and produced their EP Kievan Rus.

The band was cast in a series of Coca-Cola commercial called "Girl Band" directed by cinematographer Lance Acord that aired in 2005. Mike Viola provided lyrics and musical direction for the commercials, but 'Kiev's' music was used for the series of ads. Various articles referenced the Coke ad highlighting the DIY attitude of the band, the documentary style used by Acord for the Coke "Real" campaign, and the ironic juxtaposition of a real "girl band" in an advertisement being more "real" than the reality TV show "American Idol" during which it aired.

Vidal started a new project, Your Kid Sister, while an art student at Concordia University in Montreal. Your Kid Sister began as an homage to Rancid, her favorite punk band, and she covered Rancid songs in the persona of Tim Armstrong's fictional younger sister. Rancid's ...And Out Come the Wolves was a major influence and during the Your Kid Sister project, Vidal always performed while wearing a wolf hat. Her music video for the song, "Poison", was made during a summer class at Cornell University taught by animator Lynn Tomlinson.

In 2009, Vidal moved to Barcelona and began writing new material while continuing to perform Rancid covers as Your Kid Sister, and playing in other bands. She independently released the album 'Poison: 5 Rancid Songs That I Love' in 2010.

Barcelona design company Desigual commissioned Vidal to compose music for the "Dreams 2011" ad campaign featuring designs by Christian Lacroix.

While writing and recording new material she transitioned to using her given name, Maïa Vidal, as her performance name. Her first effort as Maïa Vidal, God Is My Bike was recorded in Barcelona and was released in Europe and Japan by the Belgian label Crammed Discs on October 31, 2011.

Guitarist Marc Ribot plays on two of the tracks on the album: "God Is My Bike", and "Le Tango de la Femme Abandonnée".

Several French and Spanish radio and television programs have interviewed Vidal about her influences and her approach to music. She tours widely in Europe, and recently played 3 sold-out shows in Japan opening for the French artist Zaz. Vidal's 'Follow me' track has been used in the Greek IKEA commercials and in the DKNY fragrance commercial for the fragrance "Be Delicious."

Positive reviews of the album "God Is My Bike" include a listing in the influential French rock magazine Les Inrockuptibles as one of their "5 groups to follow" in which they write, "Simple yet twisted, playful and delicate, [Maïa Vidal's] brief pop masterpieces don't evoke any specific territory and don't burden themselves with any roots."

Vidal's 'Follow Me' music video was nominated for the UK Music Video Awards in 2012 in the category Best Pop Video International, along with Lana del Rey (who went on to win the award), Rhianna, and Justice.

Two of her songs from "God Is My Bike" ("Le Tango de la Femme Abandonnée" and "The Waltz [Instrumental]") were featured in the animated feature "The Scapegoats" (2013), by independent filmmaker Tor E. Steiro

In the summer of 2015, the beer company Estrella Damm released a short film entitled "D'acord" (in Catalan) / "Vale" (in Spanish) directed by Alejandro Amenabar and starring Dakota Johnson, Natalia Tena, and Quim Gutierrez. Vidal wrote the song "Our Place" for the short film. In the summer of 2018, Estrella Damm did another short directed by Dani de la Torre, and Vidal had a cameo appearance playing "Our Place" outside of a guitar shop.

In 2017, Vidal started a new project in Barcelona, called Side Chick, with Eduardo Benatar (drums) and Scarlett (vocals, guitar). They published a CD called Side Chick in 2019.

== Discography ==
Vidal has been involved in 4 groups that have available recordings:

=== Side Chick ===
- Side Chick (CD) (2019)

=== Maïa Vidal ===
- God Is My Bike (CD) (2011), featuring Marc Ribot
- Maia Vidal (EP) (2011)
- SPACES (CD) (2013)
- You're the Waves (CD) (2015)

=== Your Kid Sister ===
Poison: 5 Rancid Songs That I Love (2010)

=== Kiev (Kievan Rus) ===
- Kievan Rus (EP) (2004)
- Live at the Chapter House (2004)
- Get Out of My Basement (2003)
