= Nina Hynes =

Irish musician and music producer

- Origin: Dublin, Republic of Ireland
- Genre: Alternative
- Occupations: Composer, musician, songwriter, singer, performer
- Instruments: Guitar, harp, piano, ukekele, keys, beats
- Years active: 1998–present
- Labels: Transplant Records Kitty-Yo, Reverb Records
- Members: Nina Hynes
- Website: https://therealninahynes.com/

Nina Hynes is a musician and music producer from Dublin, Ireland.

== Music career ==
Hynes made her music debut in 1999 with the release of the EP 'Creation' on Reverb Records. In the early 2000s, she had several tours of North America and won the support of Nic Harcourt at KCRW, among others. Following her first LP the 2002 release 'Staros' on Reverb Records her successful single release 'Mono Prix' granted her success in her native Ireland.

Hynes gained success in the European underground music scene most notable in Ireland, Czech Republic and Slovakia this popularity broadened through extensive touring with her band 'Nina Hynes and The Husbands' throughout 2002 to 2008. She toured extensively in the U.S. from 1999 to 2002. At an early age, she toured with experimental composers Hector Zazou and Brian Eno collaborator Harold Budd. Jane Birkin and Melanie Gabriel covered Hynes's songs on Hector Zazou's album Strong Currents in 2003. She sang on the 2009 Abbey Rd. Children in Need single ‘All you need is love’ by The Beatles and singing on ‘My Favorite Things’ from The Sound of Music for CIN album.

Hynes first released her debut album in 2002 'Staros' to critical acclaim in her native Ireland and with some recognition in the US. Her second album was released in 2007 'Really Really Do'. She has appeared on RTÉ's Other Voices, No Disco and The View.

She has been a member of Art Music Collectives A=Apple, Sending Letters to the Sea and A Generous Act and has collaborated with many musicians. In 2010, she had a musical residency at The Mattress Factory museum, Pittsburgh and took part in a collaborative album as part of A Generous Act collective. She has played support to Roxy Music, Stereolab, Smog, David Gray, The Swell Season, The Frames, Joan as Police Woman, Cat Power, Damien Rice. She toured Europe with Irish artist Glen Hansard in the fall of 2019.

After giving birth to her first child in 2008, Hynes did not tour or release until 2011 when she put out a new track called 'In A Million'. The same year, she launched her Fund It campaign which give fans the opportunity to help finance the fourth studio album. The album was later recorded in Celbridge in Kildare, Brussels and Berlin. she was successful in securing finance for the LP through this initiative. in April 2013 her fourth studio album 'Goldmine' was released as a download only through her own record label Transplant Records for two weeks. The album is a collaboration with Fabien Leseure both artists, along with collaborator Sean Carpio appear under the band name 'Dancing Suns'.

== Music videos ==
- Sweet Confectionary(2022)
- Looking for you(2022)
- GO(2022)
- Unfuck the world(2020)
- HEART(2020)
- Rain (2013)
- Dancing Suns Live at Funkhaus (2013)
- Tarnished (2013)
- Sewing Machine
- Cuckoo (2011), directed by Maarten J. Boer
- Somewhere out there(2008)
- Mono Prix (2002)
- Zhivago Blue (2002)
- William Tell (2000)
- Lulu Mae (2007), directed by Jason Hickey and Jimmy Behan
- Somewhere Out There (2008), directed by Graeme Pearce
- Christmas Time is Here (2010)
- Go (2020), directed by Neil Dowling

== Discography ==
Albums/EPs

- Creation (1999)
- Can I Sleep Now?(2001)
- Staros (2002)
- Honeymood (2004)
- Really Really Do (2007)
- Goldmine (2013)
- Raging Fire (2017)
- Sanctuary(2017)
- I see a better life(2019)
- Songs from the lockdown(2020)
- Incant(2020)

Singles

- Universal / This Magic Stuff (2002)
- Mono Prix (2002)
- Road Relish (2002)
- Honeymood (2004)
- Flutter And Wow (2006)
- Fitness / Somewhere Out There(2007)
- In A Million (2011)
- Dancing Suns (2013)
- Unfuck The World (2019)
- Rabbit Hole (2019)
- White Butterfly (2020)
- Phoenix (2022)
- Excerpts from Slidre (2023)
- Baby Alive (2023)
- A burning Peat (2024)
- Mommy's got your back (2024)

Collaborations

- Vocals on Magda's live sets from the band Blotter Trax(Release TBC)(2019-2020)
- Vocals on "A Place For The Other" and "From One To Ten" from the Array album "First World Power Conference" (2006)
- Vocals on "Deeper Than Heaven" from the Jimmy Behan album "Days Are What We Live In" (2004)
- Vocals on "Under My Wing" from the Hector Zazou album "Strong Currents" (2003)
- Vocals on "So New" with Cillian Murphy for Disco Pigs Soundtrack (2001)
- Vocals on "No Bagsies, No Keepsies" from the Messiah J & The Expert album "Now This I Have To Hear" (2006)
- Vocals on "On The Skyline" and "Dorothy Goes Home" from the Super Extra Bonus Party album "Super Extra Bonus Party" (2007)
- Vocals on "Twinkle" from the compilation "An Indiecater Christmas" (2008)
