= Chansons des mers froides =

1994 studio album by Hector Zazou

Chansons des mers froides (Songs from the Cold Seas)

Studio album by Hector Zazou
- Released: March 1995
- Recorded: 1994
- Genre: Ambient
- Length: 50:29
- Label: Columbia
- Producer: Jean-Michel Reusser

Hector Zazou chronology
| Sahara Blue (1992) | Chansons des mers froides (Songs from the Cold Seas) (1995) | Glyph (1995) |

Chansons des mers froides (French title) or Songs from the Cold Seas (English title) is a studio album by French musician Hector Zazou. Although pressed by Columbia in 1994, the release date was delayed and pushed back for March 1995 in France and Europe and the US / Australasia. Zazou enlisted several singers for the recording, such as Siouxsie Sioux, Björk, John Cale, Suzanne Vega and Jane Siberry among others, and native singers of the Arctic.

== Background ==
Zazou approached Sony Records that owned Columbia Records with merely the title and the concept of songs from the Arctic. He travelled three years for the record. He was accompanied by cameraman Philippe Roméo as he recorded traditional folk songs in and from Alaska, Canada (Newfoundland), Greenland, Iceland, Japan, Scandinavia and Scotland. He incorporated the shamanic incantations and lullabies of aboriginal people such as the Ainu, Inuit, Nanai, and Yakuts. "I didn't want to work like an ethnomusicologist and just go to Sweden and come back with a song." Zazou explained the process at the time of the album's release. "I was more interested in giving a poetic image of the North, which means that some elements are true; some are not true. It's my portrait of the cold seas."

The only original composition, "The Long Voyage", was written by Zazou as an expression of gratitude to his record company for granting him complete artistic freedom on the project. The song was released as a promo CD single in the US and featured several remixes, including one by Mad Professor and by Zazou himself. The duet on "The long voyage" is a Oscar Wilde recitation.

As lyrics no longer exist for the traditional song "Annukka Suaren Neito" Sari Kaasinen of Varttina wrote lyrics based on the folk tale of the young girl Annukka who wants to marry a man who lives in the ocean.

The song "Adventures in the Scandinavian Skin Trade" was remixed by William Orbit but never released.

== Critical reception ==
The album received a glowing review in the Washington Post: "[Zazou]'s arranged each piece with meticulous care, borrowing from pop, folk, jazz and rock sources in a way that's far more tasteful than trendy".

The US promo CD single of "The Long Voyage" was reviewed in Billboard magazine and praised for its "subtle classical and world-beat references", and Zazou was hailed as a "genius composer".

The album was praised in May 1995 in Billboard as "a stunning sonic portrait of a region".

In 2006 The Guardian included it in their "The greatest albums you've never heard" list, for its "stunning cocktail" described as "an ice shower for the temperate and tropical hangover".

== Contributing musicians ==
Ainu Dancers of Hokkaidō, Balanescu Quartet, percussionist Budgie (of Siouxsie and the Banshees), Barbara Gogan, trumpet player Mark Isham, Lightwave, Sakharine Percussion Group, Brendan Perry (of Dead Can Dance), Noriko Sanagi, Marina Schmidt, Guy Sigsworth, Sissimut Dance Drummers, recorded music parts for the album.

== Track listing ==
1. "Annukka Suaren Neito" – Värttinä
2. "Vísur Vatnsenda-Rósu" – Björk
3. "The Long Voyage" – Suzanne Vega & John Cale
4. "Havet Stormar" – Lena Willemark
5. "Adventures in the Scandinavian Skin Trade" – Wimme Saari
6. "She's Like a Swallow" – Jane Siberry
7. "The Lighthouse" – Siouxsie
8. "Oran na Maighdean Mhara" – Catherine-Ann MacPhee
9. "Yaisa Maneena" – Tokiko Kato
10. "Iacoute Song" – Lioudmila Khandi
11. "Song of the Water" – Kilabuk & Nooveya
