= Ian Simmonds =

Welsh electronic musician

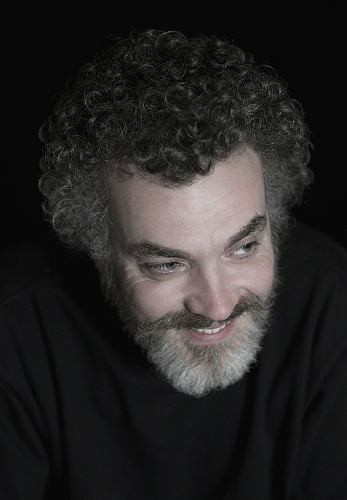
- Ian Simmonds in 2009

Background information
- Also known as: Juryman
- Born: Ian Simmonds; March 22, 1966 (age 60); Wales
- Genres: Electronic, trip hop
- Occupations: Disc jockey music producer singer
- Years active: 1987–present
- Labels: Acid Jazz, FFRR, Open Toe Records, Orange Egg Records, All That's Left, Pussyfoot Records, Ntone, SSR Records, Crammed Discs, !K7, Musik Krause, Goldmin Music
- Formerly of: Wise in Time
- Website: www.ian-simmonds.com

Ian Simmonds (born 1966), also known as Juryman, is a Welsh-born electronic musician. He is one of a few talents "to successfully breach the chasm that keeps DJ culture from more tangible, organic realms." His complex musical landscapes are often accompanied by his deep calm voice, making poetic, political and social statements at the same time. He is a self-taught musician, singing and playing trumpet, bass guitar, piano and is a producer with numerous releases, contributions and co-productions.

== Biography ==
=== Background ===
Simmonds spent part of his childhood following his trumpet-playing dad around the world. When he turned 18, he moved to London and formed a collective called Sandals with three other friends. This collective came together in the late 1980s to start a club in London Soho called "Violets", a response to the emerging acid house scene and early rave culture. Events in several other clubs followed. In the onset of the 1990s, the "Sandals" were formed in that humus and had little success, suddenly publishing for London Records. Simmonds started publishing his own deep, vibrant music in 1995 first under his pseudonym Juryman, later on under his real name Ian Simmonds.

=== Music ===
In the mid-1990s, Simmonds began recording a series of EPs. He also produced his tracks for the then-unknown Leftfield and Pressure Drop, which would later influence his own work. During these recordings, he met musician Luke Gordon, also known as Spacer. In 1997, SSR published a collaboration LP Juryman vs Spacer: Mailorder Justice. His solo debut LP published in 1999 by !K7 Ian Simmonds: Last States of Nature was well perceived and consolidated his reputation as an innovative producer. It was soon followed by the LP Juryman: The Hill, published in 2000 by SSR Records. In 2001, Ian Simmonds: Return to X released at !K7; another Juryman LP got released in 2002, Escape to Where.

Since the mid-1990s, he has worked with several other artists such as Leftfield, Goldfrapp, and Pressure Drop on various collaborations, remixes, and accompanied by appearances on dozens of compilations. He also composed music for Adam Smith's Channel 4 documentary A.I.P.S.

In 2005, Simmonds moved to Germany to work with local musicians on his jazz project Wise in Time. Since then, he has released music under his own name through Musik Krause, a sublabel of Freude am Tanzen, where five EPs were released and his recent LP, Ian Simmonds: Burgenland Dubs.

== Discography ==
=== Albums ===
==== The Sandals ====
- Rite to Silence (Acid Jazz), 1994
- Yesterdays Tomorrow (Rudiment Records, Japan), 2009

==== Juryman ====
- Juryman vs Spacer: Mailorder Justice (SSR Records), 2000
- The Hill (SSR Records), 2000
- Escape to Where (SSR Records), 2002

==== Ian Simmonds ====
- Last States of Nature (!K7), 1999
- Return to X (!K7), 2000
- Burgenland Dubs (Musik Krause), 2009
- The Right Side of Kind (Goldmin Music), 2015

==== Wise in Time ====
- The Ballad of Den the Men (Crammed Discs), 2006
- Know The Words? (All That's Left), 2009

=== Singles and EPs ===
==== Sandals ====
- "A Profound Gas", Maxi (Acid Jazz), 1992
- "We Wanna Live", Maxi (Open Toe Records), 1992
- Cracked EP, EP (Open Toe Records), 1994
- "Feet", Maxi (Open Toe Records), 1994
- "Nothing", Maxi (FFRR), 1998

==== Juryman ====
- One, 12" (Orange Egg Records), 1995
- Two, 12" (All That's Left), 1995
- 3, 12" (Ntone), 1997
- 4, 12" (SSR Records), 1997
- Remixes from the Hill, 12" (SSR Records), 2001
- Overstretchin, Maxi, (SSR Records), 2002

==== Ian Simmonds ====
- Hidden Witness EP, 12" (!K7), 1999
- Man with No Thumbs, 12" (!K7), 1999
- Return to X (The Spacer & Slop Shop Remixes), 10" (!K7), 2001
- Swinging Millie EP, 12" (!K7), 2001
- International Songs, 12" (Musik Krause), 2005
- Standing Man EP, 12" (Musik Krause), 2006
- The Wendelstein Variantions EP, EP" (Musik Krause), 2008
- The Woodhouse EP, 12" (Musik Krause), 2008

==== Wise in Time ====
- Slowfall, 10" (Electric Tones), 2001

=== Remixes ===
==== Juryman ====
- "Barbara Gogan – Made on Earth (Remixes)" Dangerous (Juryman Mix), SSR Records, 1997
- "Statik Sound System – Remix Selection" Free to Choose (Juryman Mix), Cup of Tea Records, 1997
- "Suba – Felicidade Remixes" Felicidade (Juryman's Ocean Hill Rework, Crammed Discs, 2000
- "So Blue It's Black" So Blue It's Black (Juryman Mix), Blue (Island), 2000
- "Clubber's Guide to Breaks" So Blue It's Black (Juryman Mix), Ministry of Sound, 2002
- "Suba – Tributo" Felicidade (Juryman Mix), Crammed Discs, 2002
- "The Underwolves – Under Your Sky (Remixes)" So Blue It's Black (Juryman Mix), Jazzanova Compost Records, 2002
- "Crammed Global Soundclash 1980–89 The Connoisseur Edition" Aksak Maboul's Saure Gurke (Juryman Mix), Crammed Discs, 2003
- Electrix Gypsyland Juryman reconstruction of Taraf de Haidouks Cind Eram La'48, Crammed Discs, 2004

==== Ian Simmonds ====
- "Silent Poets – Drawing" The Children of the Future (Turnpike Blues Mix) (Ian Simmonds Remix), Toys Factory, 1995
- "Sofa Surfers – Constructions: Sofa Surfers Remixed And Dubbed" If It Were Not For You (Ian Simmonds Remix), Klein Records, 1995
- "A Guy Called Gerald – Humanity" Humanity (Ian Simmonds Remix), !K7, 2000
- "Polar – Mind Of A Killer" Mind Of A Killer (Ian Simmonds Mix), Certificate 18, 2000
- "Peace Orchestra – Shining Repolished Versions" Shining (Ian Simmonds Rework), G-Stone Recordings, 2000
- "Beanfield – The Season / Catalpa" Catalpa (Ian Simmonds Rework), Compost Records, 2000
- "Various: Inside 03" Slop Shop – Gone (Ian Simmonds Rework), Poets CLub Records, 2001
- "Beth Hirsch – Nest Sensation" Nest Sensation (Full Vox Repo), !K7, 2001
- "Various: Electronic Resistance" Peace Orchestra – Shining (Ian Simmonds Rework), Poets CLub Records, 2001

=== Tracks on compilations, soundtracks and miscellaneous releases ===
- "Juryman – Know Kname" on The Cream Of Trip Hop (Issue 1) Arctic Records, 1995
- "Juryman – If The Law Suits" on Beats By Dope Demand Three Kickin Records, 1996
- "Juryman vs Spacer – R.S.I" on Freezone 4 – Dangerous Lullabies, SSR Records, 1997
- "Juryman vs Spacer – R.S.I" on Pressure Drop & Tipper – Creative Trip Hop, Sound and Media Ltd., 1997
- "Juryman – Bineric Blues" on Naturally Stoned – The Very Best Of Blunted Beats Vol. 1, Millennium Records, 1997
- "Juryman – Playground" on The Future Sound Of Jazz Vol. 4 Compost Records, 1997
- "Juryman – The Ghost Hunter" on Codachromes Chapter Two, Distance, 2000
- "Juryman – The Morning" on New Voices Vol. 37, Rolling Stone, 2000
- "Juryman – The Woven" on Trax Sampler 028, Trax Sampler, 2000
- "Juryman – East of Here" on Freezone: Seven Is Seven Is, SSR Records, 2001
- "Juryman – The Ghost Hunter" on Nova Mix 01 – Full Spectrum – Gilb'R, Nova Records, 2001
- "Juryman – The Ghost Hunter" on Distance Cafe, Nova Records, 2002
- "Juryman – Belle's Poem" on Novo Brasil 01, Distance Records, 2002
- "Juryman – The Ghost Hunter" on Electric Gypsyland, Crammed Discs, 2003
- "Juryman – Belle's Poem" on Mosquito Bar 4: Chill Out Sessions, BMG Belgium, 2003
- "Juryman vs. Taraf de Haïdouks – Cind Eram La '48 (Chronicle Of A Peasant Uprising)" on Electric Gypsiland, Crammed Discs, 2003
- "Juryman – Chinese Mike" on Cabin In The Sky, Cramboy, 2004
- "Juryman – Overstretchin" on Nu Pop, Wagram, 2004
- "Juryman – The Morning" on Trip Hop Anthology, Wagram, 2006
- "Juryman – The Morning" on Saint-Germain Des-Pres Café Paris, Wagram, 2007
- "Ian Simmonds – Luna Swell" on Atlas Earth, Jumpin' & Pumpin', 1997
- "Ian Simmonds – Childhood" on Joint Ventures, NINEBARecords, 1997
- "Ian Simmonds – The Man With No Thumbs" on Offering 2: The Past, Present & Future Of !K7, !K7, 1998
- "Ian Simmonds – Theme To The Last Puma" on Transatlantik Lounging, Life Enhancing Audio, 1999
- "Ian Simmonds – Alvin's Blues" on Musikexpress 42 – !K7, Life Enhancing Audio, 2000
- "Ian Simmonds – Alvin's Blues" on Cassagrande Lounge, Cassagrande, 2001
- "Ian Simmonds – Jet" on Mind The Gap Volume 35, Gonzo Circus, 2001
- "Ian Simmonds – Swingin' Millie (Slop Shop Jam)" on Kid Kenobi Featuring MC Shureshock – Clubber's Guide To Breaks Vol. 2, Ministry of Sound, 2002
- "Ian Simmonds – Swingin' Millie (Slop Shop Mix)" on Music For Modern Living Vol. 5, Lounge Records, 2001
- "Ian Simmonds – Theme To The Last Puma" on Saint-Germain-Des-Prés Café, Wagram, 2001
- "Ian Simmonds – Alvin's Blues" on Springone Compilation, Zeiger Records, 2001
- "Ian Simmonds – Alvin's Blues" on The Chillout Lounge, Smooth Music, 2001
- "Ian Simmonds – Swingin' Millie (Slop Shop Mix)" on Fruit 2 – Melon, Musicpark Records, 2002
- "Ian Simmonds & DJ Rocca – Better Man" on Illicit Sounds Of Maffia – Chapter 3, Kom-Fut Manifesto Records, 2003
- "Ian Simmonds – The Dog" on Michael Mayer – Immer 2, Kompakt, 2006
- "Wise in Time – Slow Fall" on Club Bogaloo 2, Spinning Wheels Records, 2003

== Contributions ==
- "Sandals – Venice Groove" on Volume Five, (Bass Ian Simmonds), Volume, 1992
- "How Now – Humble Souls" on Humble Souls – How Now, (Producer Ian Simmonds, et al.), Acid Jazz, 1993
- "Sandals – Venice Groove" on Wasted – The Best Of Volume (Part 1), (Bass Ian Simmonds), Volume, 1995
- "Spacer – Agent Orange" on Spacer – Atlas Earth, (Vocals, Written by Ian Simmonds), Pussyfoot Records, 1996
- "Spacer – Cursory Rub" on Spacer – The Beamer, (Bass Ian Simmonds), Pussyfoot Records, 2001
- "Spacer – Houston" on Red Snapper – It's All Good (Live Version), (Bass Ian Simmonds), Keep Diggin' Records, 2002
- "Spacer – Houston" on Red Snapper – It's All Good (Live Version), (Bass Ian Simmonds), Keep Diggin' Records, 2002
- "The Orchestra – Tune Three" on The Orchestra – Look Away Now, (Bass Ian Simmonds), Dummond Street Records, 2002
- "Sandals – Nothing" on Giant Steps (Volume One), (Written by Ian Simmonds, et al.), FFRR (US), 1993
- "Sandals – A Profound Gas" on Soul CD 8 In Conjunction With Acid Jazz, (Written by Ian Simmonds, et al.), Soul CD Magazine, 1993
- "Sandals – Nothing (Leftfield Dub)" on Slowburn: Blissed-Out Beats And After Hours Anthems, (Written by Ian Simmonds, et al.), Rumor Records, 1993
- "Sandals – We wanna live" on Silly Symphonies – Guerrilla, fight for your right to party, (Written by Ian Simmonds, et al.), Essential Dance Music, 1996
- "Sandals – Feet (Scott Hardkiss Remix)" on Yes – A Scott Hardkiss Mix, (Written by Ian Simmonds, et al.), Hardkiss, 1996
- "Sandals – Nothing" on Roadkill! 1.10, (Written by Ian Simmonds, et al.), Hot Tracks, 2000
- "Sandals – Feet (Dust Brothers Remix)" on The Chemical Brothers – The Remixes Vol. 06, (Written by Ian Simmonds, et al.), Dummond Street Records, 2002
- "Sandals – Nothing" on The Chillout Session: Ibiza Sunsets, (Written by Ian Simmonds, et al.), Ministry of Sound, 2003
- "Sandals – Nothing" on Acid Jazz Classics, (Written by Ian Simmonds, et al.), Ministry of Sound, 2004
- "Sandals – Venice Groove" on Denz Da Denz Vol. 1, (Written by Ian Simmonds, et al.), BMG, 2004
