= Sandy Dillon =

American singer and songwriter (1960–2022)

- Birth name: Sandra Ann Dillon
- Born: May 19, 1960; Cohasset, Massachusetts, U.S.
- Died: August 4, 2022 (aged 62); London, England
- Years active: 1980s–2022
- Labels: Elektra, One Little Indian
- Formerly of: Ensemble Modern, Man Parrish

Sandra Ann Dillon (May 19, 1960 – August 4, 2022) was an American singer-songwriter. She released several solo albums, describing her music as "jazz-punk western blues", and also worked with Ensemble Modern and Man Parrish.

== Career ==
Born near Cape Cod, Dillon took up piano at the age of 6, and studied Orchestral Composition at Berklee College of Music in Boston, before moving to New York City where she lived at the Chelsea Hotel. She played Janis Joplin on Broadway in Rock n Roll: The First 5,000 Years where she was spotted by Tony DeFries, who had managed both David Bowie and Iggy Pop. DeFries steered her to Elektra, for whom she recorded two (unreleased) albums Candy From A Stranger (produced by Man Parrish) and Flowers (co-produced by Mick Ronson and Dieter Meier), those songs previewed in a performance at Ronnie Scotts alongside Ronson on guitar. Elektra released her third set as her debut album.

Dillon moved to London where she met her husband Steve Bywaters, who was a member of the Churchfitters (also known as the Blue Lighthouse Brigade in alternate form) alongside Pete Brown (bass and sax), Geoff Coombs (mandolin, whistles and vocals) and Angus Wallace (guitar and vocals). Steve Bywaters subsequently went on to produce several of Dillon's albums. She signed to One Little Indian for whom she recorded Electric Chair. In 2000 she released Las Vegas Is Cursed, a collaboration with Hector Zazou and East Overshoe. In 2001 Steve Bywaters died after suffering a heart attack. Dillon went on and recorded the well-received Nobody's Sweetheart, produced by Julius from Kinobe and featuring guest vocals from Heather Nova, which was the first of Dillon's albums to be released in the US, in 2004. She then recorded the album Pull the Strings, which was released in 2006. Her 2008 album, Living in Dreams, was recorded in Germany together with her new husband Ray Majors (Mott The Hoople, The Yardbirds) and produced by David Coulter. Dillon and Majors also contributed vocals and guitar to Sisters Euclid's album 96 Tears, a collection of cover versions.

Dillon died in London in August 2022. Her death occurred just hours apart from that of her husband, Ray Majors.

== Discography ==
=== Albums ===
- Dancing on the Freeway (1995), Elektra
- Skating (1996), Bonjour
- Electric Chair (1999), One Little Indian/Virgin
- 12 (Las Vegas is Cursed) by Sandy Dillon & Hector Zazou (2000), Crammed Discs
- East Overshoe (2001), One Little Indian
- Nobody's Sweetheart (2003), One Little Indian
- Pull the Strings (2006), One Little Indian
- Living in Dreams (2008), Tradition & Moderne
- Flowers (2013), NRX
- Shipwrecked (2013)

=== Singles ===
- "Flowers" (1985), Mainman
- "Shoreline" (2007), One Little Indian
