= Chancha Vía Circuito =

Argentine disc jockey

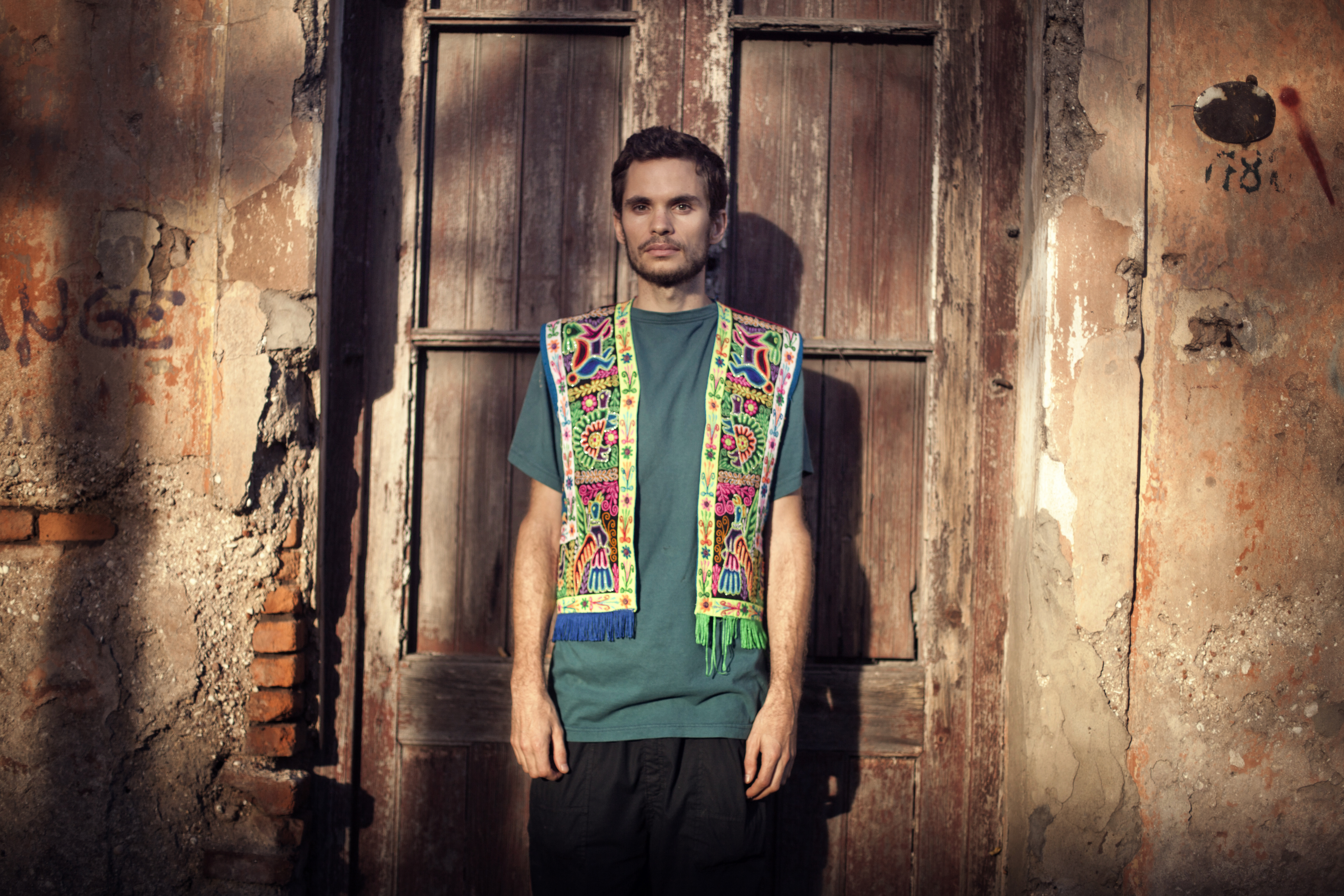
- Canale in 2014

Background information
- Born: Pedro Pablo Canale; Greater Buenos Aires
- Origin: Argentina
- Genres: Electronic, World music, Cumbia
- Occupations: Producer, Composer, DJ, Remixer
- Years active: 2005–present
- Labels: Waxploitation; ZZK Records; Crammed Discs (for Europe); Wonderwheel Recordings (for USA)
- Website: Chancha Vìa Circuito on facebook

Pedro Pablo Canale, better known as his stage name Chancha Vía Circuito is a producer, DJ/remixer and composer, from Greater Buenos Aires, Argentina. Fusion of electronic music and cumbia is key factor of Chancha Vía Circuito's music. He explores the minimal side of digital cumbia with inspiration from Afro-dance, murgas, minimal dub, IDM, and downtempo. Computer bleeps share sonic space with folkloric chant. Candombe drums are accompanied by the sample of a machete splicing the air and a vocal line of indigenous bebop is layered over hints of dub.

Canale launched an EP "Bienaventuranza remixes", with collaborations from Nicola Cruz, El Búho, Rafael Aragon and Baiuca. He released an album in December 2018 with his project “Pino Europeo”, in collaboration with accordion player Chango Spasiuk.

Since 2010 Chancha Vía Circuito is one of the favorite artists of NPR's Alt.Latino.

== Discography ==
=== Albums ===
- Rodante (2008)
- Río Arriba (2010)
- Los Pastores Mixtape (2010)
- Amansara (2014)
- Bienaventuranza (2018)
- Pino Europeo (2018)
- La Estrella (2022)

=== Singles & EPs ===
- Bersa Discos (2008)
- Rodante (2008)
- Bosques Via Temperley (2008)
- Semillas EP (2012)
- Coplita (2014)
- Amansara Remixes (2015)
- Bienaventuranza Remixes (2019)
- Como Noide (2019)
- Pleamar (2020)
- Ceremonia (2021)
- Tenalach (2024)

=== DJ Mixes ===
- Río Arriba Mixtape (2010)
- Mixtape Cumbiero - European Tour 2013 (2013)
