= Allá =

Allá is a rock band formed by three young Chicanos (Mexican-Americans) from Chicago: Jorge Ledezma (guitars, keyboards, vibraphone, composer & producer), his brother Angel Ledezma (drums) and Lupe Martinez (vocals, guitar and keyboards). As inspired by German krautrock (Can, Faust), '60s pop productions (from Phil Spector to Tamla Motown) and electronica as by Mexican trio music and Brazilian Tropicalia, they aim at producing a kind of psychedelic Latin pop/rock. The band members previously collaborated in an instrumental band called Defender, and the Ledezma brothers have played with former Can singer Damo Suzuki.

Allá's debut album was produced over a four-year period by Jorge Ledezma with sound engineer Colin Studybaker (Iron and Wine, National Trust). Recordings took place in and around Chicago, at Clava Studios, Engine Music, (Tortoise's) John McEntire's Soma Electronic Studios and others, as well as at Tambourine Studios in Sweden, where Jorge laid down the string and horn arrangements alongside arranger Patrik Bartosch (Eggstone, The Cardigans). Entitled Es Tiempo, the album came out on Crammed Discs in 2008.

Allá are about to release a mini-album of cover versions, entitled Digs and recorded as a tribute to artists who have inspired them: Faust, The Residents, John Cale/Terry Riley, Mexican psych-rock band from the '70s Los Dug Dugs, and Kanye West.

In Spanish, allá means "over there", and is the word used by Chicanos when talking about their parents' homeland, as well as by Mexicans when talking about the USA. The very ambiguity of the word perfectly represents how Jorge, Lupe and Angel feel: that they're the product of these combined cultures, neither here nor there.

== Press quotes ==
- "This is an artist's rendering of heaven on earth. It's bliss and togetherness and absolutely perfect weather, now and forever". (Fluxblog, USA)
- "Allá updates Brazilian tropicalia for the bilingual post-rock set." (Time Out Chicago, USA)
- "The Chicano Portishead… Shiny, summery… recall the retro-futurism of Stereolab… spookier instrumentals suggest Can or Faust. Throughout, Lupe Martinez's voice provides a constantly hypnotic feature" (Uncut, UK)
- "The trio's globally savvy pop embraces not just their Mexican heritage, but immaculate Swedish pop, Brazilian Tropicalia, Krautrock, and Chicago's post-rock scene. Just as creative as it is sophisticated". (All Music Blog, USA)
- "The hypnotic title track underlines the band's declared love of Krautrock, while Golpes del Sol sounds like a subtle tribute to Brian Wilson… an interesting instrumental interlude shows a more adventurous, psychedelic post-rock side" (BBC.co.uk)
- "Chicago is the city with the third-biggest Latino population in the U.S., but 'Es Tiempo' imagines it as an even more cosmopolitan city of the future" (Pitchfork, USA)
- "Allá sound like the Cocteau Twins at a cocktail lounge on an Acapulco cruise ship... hints of Stereolab and Tortoise... sumptuous, exotic vibe" (Spin, USA)
