= Dominic Sonic =

French singer (1964–2020)

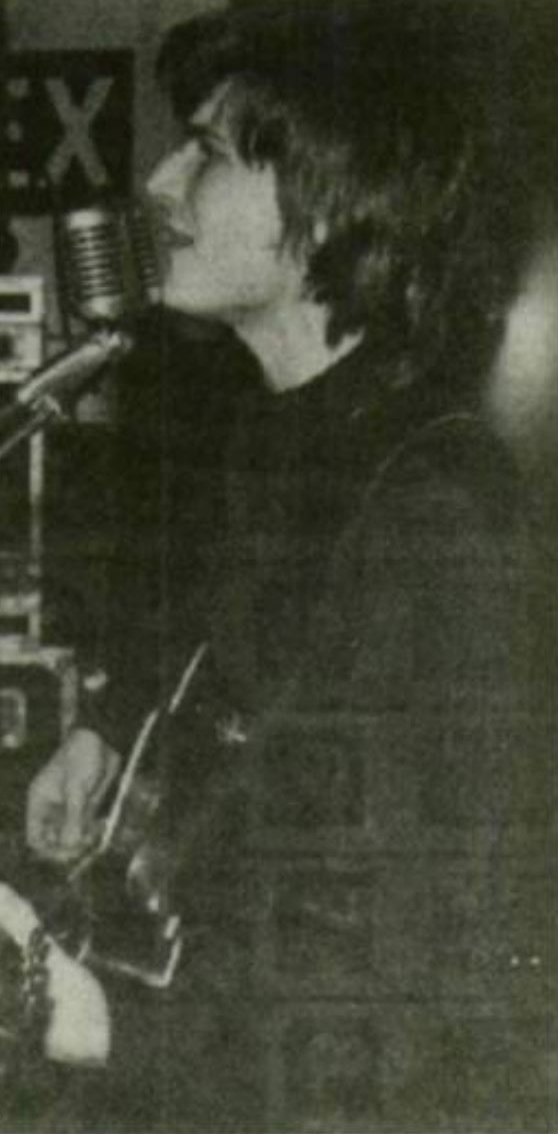
- 1993
- Born: Dominique Garreau; 11 November 1964; Dinan, France
- Died: 23 July 2020 (aged 55); Les Lilas, France
- Occupation: Singer

Dominic Sonic, stage name of Dominique Garreau (11 November 1964 – 23 July 2020) was a French singer. He released six albums from 1989 to 2015.

== Biography ==
Sonic left school at the age of 16 to join Lamballe-based punk group Kalashnikov. He remained with the group for six years and performed in over 300 concerts. In 1987, he began producing his first solo album, Cold Tears, which was released two years later by the Belgian label Crammed Discs. The album sold more than 40,000 copies in Europe. Sonic also released a mini-album, titled A s'y méprendre with Crammed Discs.

Philippe Constantin, director of Barclay, purchased Sonic's contract from Crammed Discs. He released an untitled album in 1991 for Barclay. After an accident while on tour in Hungary, Sonic stayed in a hospital for six months. This eventually led to the release of the album Les Leurres in 1994.

Sonic left Barclay in 1996 and released Essais 94-96 under his own label and distributed by Musidisc before it was bought out by Universal Music Group.

Dominic Sonic took part in the Rencontres Trans Musicales in Rennes in 2002 as a surprise guest of The Stooges. He attended numerous other festivals throughout the 2000s decade. He released Phalanstère # 7 on 15 October 2007, his 5th album. In January 2008, he performed alongside Jackie Berroyer in Nantes in the play La loi des pauvres gens, which was named after one of his songs. In 2009, Sonic performed alongside guitarist Vincent Sizorn for the 20th anniversary of the release of Cold Tears. Between 2010 and 2014, he participated in the reunification of Nus. He and the group founded the AK47 Blues Rendez-vous, which released the album The Octopus. While working on the future album of Olivier Delacroix, he released Vanités#6 in Spring 2015.

Dominic Sonic died on 23 July 2020 in Les Lilas.

== Discography ==
=== Albums ===
- Cold Tears (1989)
- Dominic Sonic (1991)
- Les Leurres (1994)
- Essais 94/96 (1996)
- Phalanstère #7 (2007)
- Vanités #6 (2015)

=== Singles and EPs ===
- mini LP 4 titres : A train song / Too late / Back in the USSR / Listen to what I say (1985)
- Lie to me (1987)
- When my tears run cold / La loi des pauvres gens (1989)
- A s’y méprendre / What I’m waiting for (1990)
- A s’y méprendre (new version)/ Shadows in the fire (live)/ No fun (live)/ Praying to the lord (live) (1990)
- He used to be/ Hey hey my my (1991)
- Ils dorment encore (1994)
- Il est encore temps (1994)
- Je crois Antoine / Stick your love with blood / Hey, little mother (1994)
