= Amatorski =

Belgian post-rock band

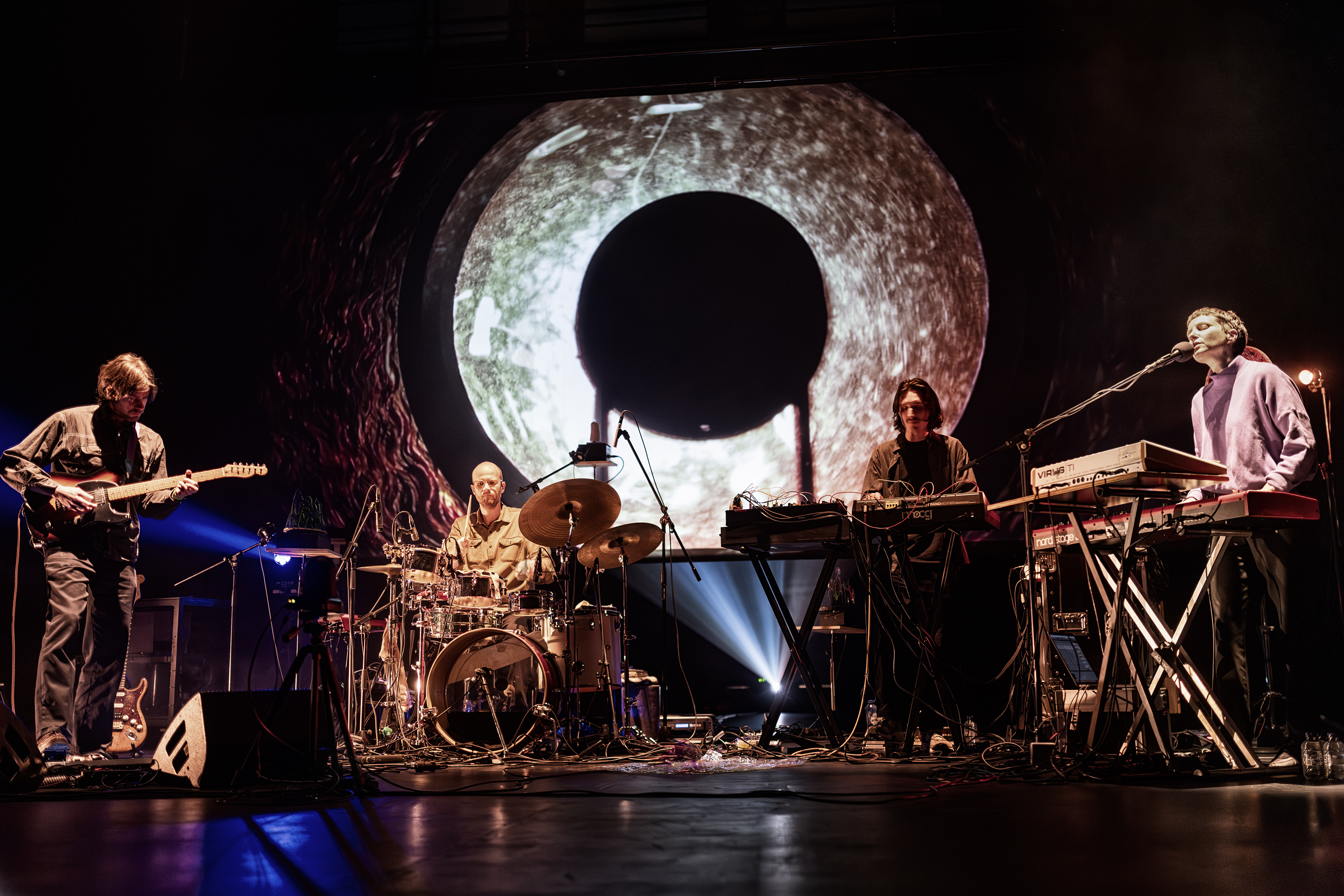
- Amatorski (2024)

Background information
- Origin: Belgium
- Genres: Post-Rock, Lo-Fi
- Years active: 2008–present
- Labels: Amatorski; Crammed Discs
- Members: Inne Eysermans; Sebastiaan Van Den Branden; Christophe Claeys
- Past members: Hilke Ros; Laurens Van Bouwelen
- Website: www.amatorski.be

Amatorski is a Belgian post-rock band consisting of Inne Eysermans, Sebastiaan Van den Branden and Christophe Claeys.

== History ==
Amatorski was formed in 2008. The group became famous after reaching the final at the Humo's Rock Rally in 2010. The band name comes from the Polish word for amateurish, accordingly the group records its music in low fidelity. Apart from that their music is also characterized by a melancholic, blurry style in which the texts are often very narrative. This is expressed in their record Come home for which singer Inne Eysermans found inspiration by reading the love letters from her grandmother that were written during World War II. This song gained fame since it was used in Belgium during publicity spots for water brand Spa Reine.

In 2011 they travelled to London, England to work with producer Darren Allison (Spiritualized, The Divine Comedy, Belle & Sebastian) on their debut album TBC. Upon its release, TBC garnered much critical acclaim, and ascended to number 5 in the Belgian album chart. Later that year, the album received nominations in several categories, at the Belgian Music Industry Awards.

Their style was often compared to that of Portishead and Sigur Ros.

Entitled from clay to figures, Amatorski's second album is coming out in April 2014, on Crammed Discs (who have also given TBC an international release in 2013).

In 2014, Dominik Scherrer composed a new orchestral version of their song "Come Home", used as the opening theme of the BBC One and Starz drama The Missing.

In December 2020, a cover of the band's song "Come Home" was featured in Toyota's annual Christmas commercial, titled "Mailbox," in partnership with the USO.

== Music Industry Awards ==
In 2010 they were nominated for three Belgian MIAs. However, they did not win any of the prizes:

- Hit of the year (Come Home)
- Best artwork (Same Stars We Shared -artwork done by Femke Vanbelle)
- Best breakthrough

== Band members ==
- Inne Eysermans (singing, piano, guitar, accordion)
- Sebastiaan Van den Branden (singing, guitar)
- Christophe Claeys drums, percussion

== Former members ==
- Hilke Ros (contrabass, synthbass)
- Laurens Van Bouwelen (drums, vibraphone)

== Discography ==
=== Albums ===
- Curves And Bends, Things Veer (Crammed Discs, 2024)
- From Clay To Figures (Crammed Discs, 2014)
- RE:TBC (Amatorsk Records, 2012)
- TBC (Munich Records, 2011)

Album(s) with hits in the Dutch Top 100	Date of appearance	Date of entrance	Highest position	Number of weeks	Remarks
Same stars we shared	June 11, 2010	-			
TBC	May 13, 2011	October 8, 2011	37	3	
From Clay To Figures	April 11, 2014				

Album(s) with hits in the Flemish Ultratop 50	Date of appearance	Date of entrance	Highest position	Number of weeks	Remarks
TBC	2011	May 21, 2011	5	23	

=== Singles ===
Single(s) with hits in the Dutch Top 40	Date of appearance	Date of entrance	Highest position	Number of weeks	Remarks
Soldier	April 24, 2011	-			Nr. 78 in the Single Top 100

Single(s) with hits in the Flemish Ultratop 50	Date of appearance	Date of entrance	Highest position	Number of weeks	Remarks
Come home	April 19, 2010	May 15, 2010	10	30	Nr. 9 in the Radio 2 Top 30
The king	October 11, 2010	October 23, 2010	tip13	-	
Soldier	2011	May 28, 2011	33	3	
Never told	2011	September 10, 2011	tip27	-	
22 Februar	December 12, 2011	December 17, 2011	tip49	-	
How are you?	2013	April 20, 2013	tip85*		
