= Lonely Drifter Karen =

Pop band

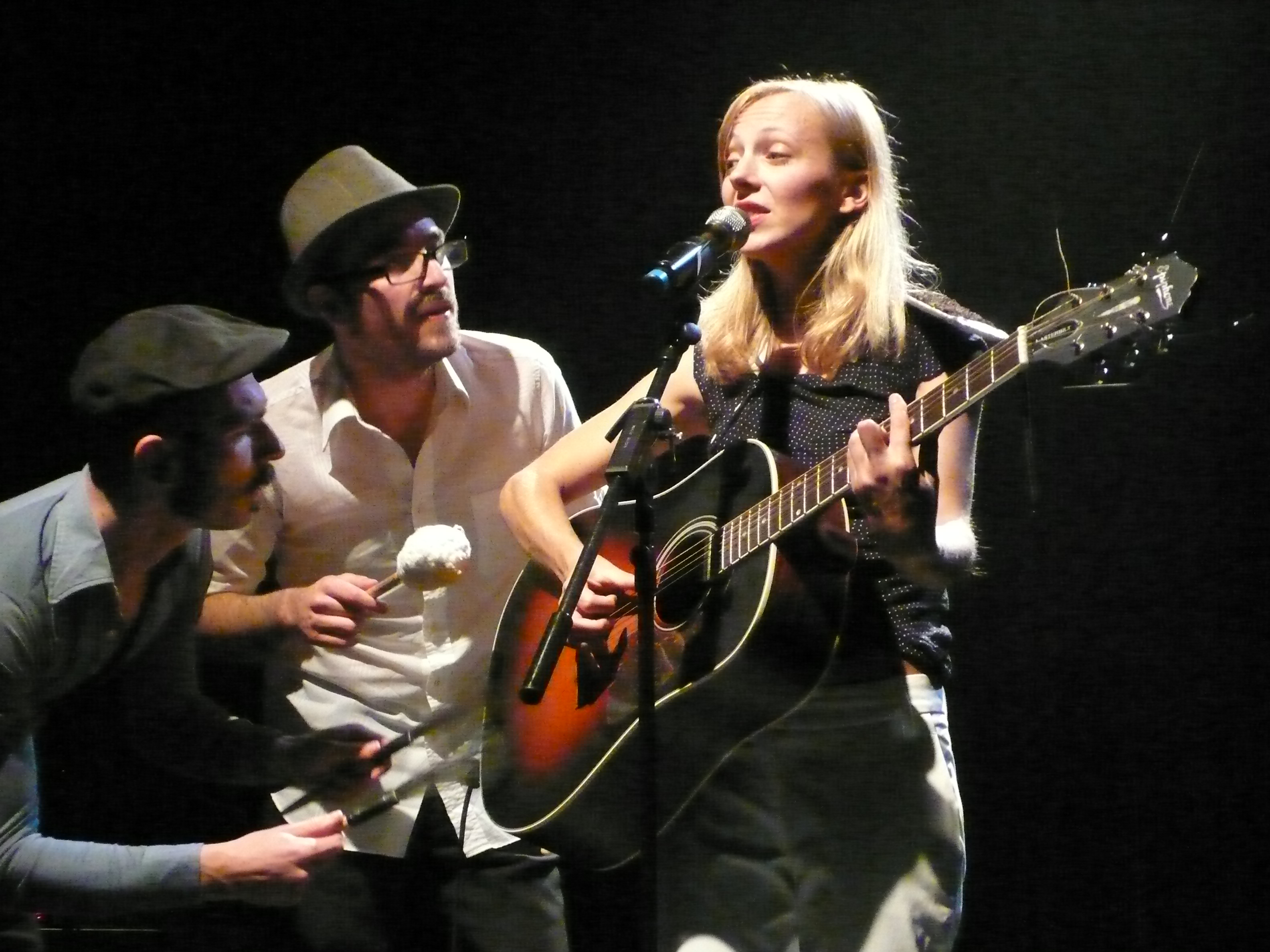
- Lonely Drifter Karen, 2008

Background information
- Origin: Barcelona, Spain; Brussels, Belgium
- Genres: Space pop, dream pop, pop
- Years active: 2003–present
- Label: Crammed Discs
- Members: Tanja Frinta; Marc Melià Sobrevias; Clément Marion; Maxime Malon
- Past members: Giorgio Fausto Menossi

Lonely Drifter Karen are a multi-national pop band, based in Brussels, Belgium. The band consists of Austrian singer Tanja Frinta, keyboarder and producer Marc Melià Sobrevias from Spain and the two Frenchmen Maxime Malon on drums and Clément Marion on guitar, who joined the band in 2012.

== Biography ==
Started as a solo project by Viennese-born Tanja Frinta while she was living in Sweden, Lonely Drifter Karen became a band when Frinta moved to Barcelona and met Italian drummer Giorgio Menossi and Majorcan keyboard player and arranger Marc Meliá Sobrevias. From December 2006 until January 2008 Frinta and Melià recorded the debut album, Grass is Singing, which was released by Crammed Discs in May 2008 in Europe, June 2008 in the United States and September 2008 in Canada. The Canadian release of the album is in collaboration with Montreal-based Semprini Records, who also released Lonely Drifter Karen's 7-inch "The Owl Moans Low" in July 2008. The Grass Is Singing album was enthusiastically welcomed by the press in several European countries

== Discography ==
=== Albums ===
- Poles (CD or Vinyl) Crammed Discs, 2012
- Fall of Spring (CD or Vinyl) Crammed Discs, 2010
1. "Dis-In-Motion"
2. "Show Your Colours"
3. "Russian Bells"
4. "Railroad"
5. "Ready to Fall"
6. "Something's Scorching"
7. "A Roof Somewhere"
8. "Julien"
9. "Eventually"
10. "Side by Side"
11. "Wonderous Ways"
12. "Seeds" (feat. Emily Jane White)
13. "Seasonal Things" (Download Bonus Track)
- Grass Is Singing (CD) Crammed Discs, 2008
1. "This World is Crazy"
2. "The Angels Sigh"
3. "Passengers of the Night"
4. "The Owl Moans Low"
5. "Climb"
6. "Casablanca"
7. "Professor Dragon"
8. "Salvation"
9. "Carousel Horses"
10. "True Desire"
11. "Giselle"
12. "No True Woman"
13. "La Hierba Canta"

=== EPs ===
- La chouette (Digital EP) Crammed Discs, 2009
1. "La Chouette (The Owl Moans Low)"
2. "La Hierba Canta" (Album Version)
- The Owl Moans Low (EP) 7" Semprini Records, Crammed Discs, 2008
1. "The Owl Moans Low"
2. "Stray Melodies"
3. "River"
- Sinsweetime 10" (green artwork) or CD single (yellow cardboard) Fettkakao, 2003
1. "The Pure Heart Sin"
2. "Beautiful Shock"
3. "Some Summer Days"
4. "Sweet (Swing) Time"

=== Videos ===
- The Owl Moans Low (directed by Christina Luschin)
- This World Is Crazy (directed by Miguel Eek)

== Press quotes ==
- "Tinged with melancholy, it's essentially jubilant, simple and lovely music, achieved without ever overdoing the saccharine levels" (Q, UK).
- "A delicious concoction taking in Weimar Republic cabaret, Parisian café music, Mittel-European classical traditions, rustic Italian ballads, gypsy folk and more, all topped by the whimsical, occasionally child-like songwriting of frontwoman Tanja Frinta. Grass Is Singing doesn't have a duff track on it" (The Daily Telegraph, UK)
- "An album fans of Björk, Joanna Newsom and Jolie Holland will love without reservation… They behave like infants locked in a candy store with a dressing-up box, appropriating French chanson, Weillian cabaret, Waitsian noir, tango, eastern European folk, twisted jazz and Broadway musicals, dashing between them with promiscuous glee as the lyrics yank the songs into places far darker than the jaunty rhythms and melodies suggest, where mad inventors, circus performers and hybrid creatures lurk. The Feist-like The Owl Moans Low and the breakneck, Sondheimesque Climb are two stunners on an album full of standouts." (Sunday Times, UK)
- "The arrangement swing elegantly between lush waltzes, stately woodwind, Weimar mischief and Hawaiian ukulele… captivating." (The Observer, UK)
- "Lonely Drifter Karen is this band's magical vehicle for a very strange kind of European musical theatre. Here the sounds of German cabaret, gypsy music and Paris cafe swing all tangle with the bright indie pop that Frinta used to make in a girl group, creating a sound-world that's both antique and modern… glued together with Frinta's 1920s jazz-club rasp… plenty of fun to be had at this circus" (Word, UK)
- "Gorgeously captivating…full of quirky melodies and surrealistic folksy storytelling lyrics loaded with evocative fairytale imagery…A tasty aural confection that's as light as the Alpine air and as deliciously rich as a Viennese Sachertorte, which brings to mind the likes of Dory Previn, The Tiger Lillies, and Felt Mountain-era Goldfrapp" (Nude, UK)
- "Clearly Karen drifts from Vienna to Gothenburg to Barcelona, gypsying through cabaret and twinkly avant-pop. Lonely Drifter Karen draw you in to their magical world primarily and satisfyingly with good music… like Joanna Newsom or Hanne Hukkelberg there is an undeniable and earnest sweetness… This is the most enjoyable aspect of this album, it drifts into itself and then out again. It drifts into familiar territory and then away. And eventually it drifts into your dreams and hangs about there, being nice and reminding you of things you thought you had forgotten." (BBC Online, UK)
- "Un disque merveilleusement arrangé, une fantasia instrumentale regardée à travers le trou de la serrure… Tanja et ses musiciens font valser le tango et la pop dans des habits haute couture, en quête de formes originales. Un doux vertige de manège de fête foraine, tout en formers fluides et baroques… Tanja Frinta pourrait être la fille cachée de Tom Waits, celle qu'il a eue lors de ses pérégrinations imaginaires dans la vieille Europe" (Les Inrockuptibles, France)
