= DJ Dolores =

Brazilian DJ

- Genres: Electronic; Manguebeat
- Years active: 2007 – present

Helder Aragão, better known as DJ Dolores, is a Brazilian DJ.

Helder Aragão was one of the participants of the mangue movement, as a designer. The crabs with brains that decorate the first release of the mangue movement were created by him. Plugged into electronic music Helder, renamed DJ Dolores, began creating his sound at the end of 1990s. Soon after came the Orchestra Santa Massa, who melded grooves with regional rhythms. The group soon gained national and world notoriety.

== Discography ==
- Aparelhagem (2005)
- 1 Real (2008)

== Scoring credits ==
- O Rap do Pequeno Príncipe Contra as Almas Sebosas, 2000
- Narradores de Javé, 2003
- A Máquina, 2005
- Critico, 2008
- Neighboring Sounds, 2012
- Tatuagem, 2013
