= Zuco 103 =

Dutch musical ensemble

Zuco 103 is a Dutch musical ensemble which plays music chiefly in the styles of the music of Brazil.

The ensemble was initially founded under the name Rec.a in 1989 by students at the Rotterdam Conservatory. Three members of the ensemble SfeQ (singer Lilian Vieira, keyboardist Stefan Schmid, and drummer Stefan Kruger) began working together as a trio, exploring the musical repertory of Vieira's native land, Brazil. They released their debut album in 2000, and their 2006 full-length Whaa! reached #11 on the U.S. Billboard World Music charts.

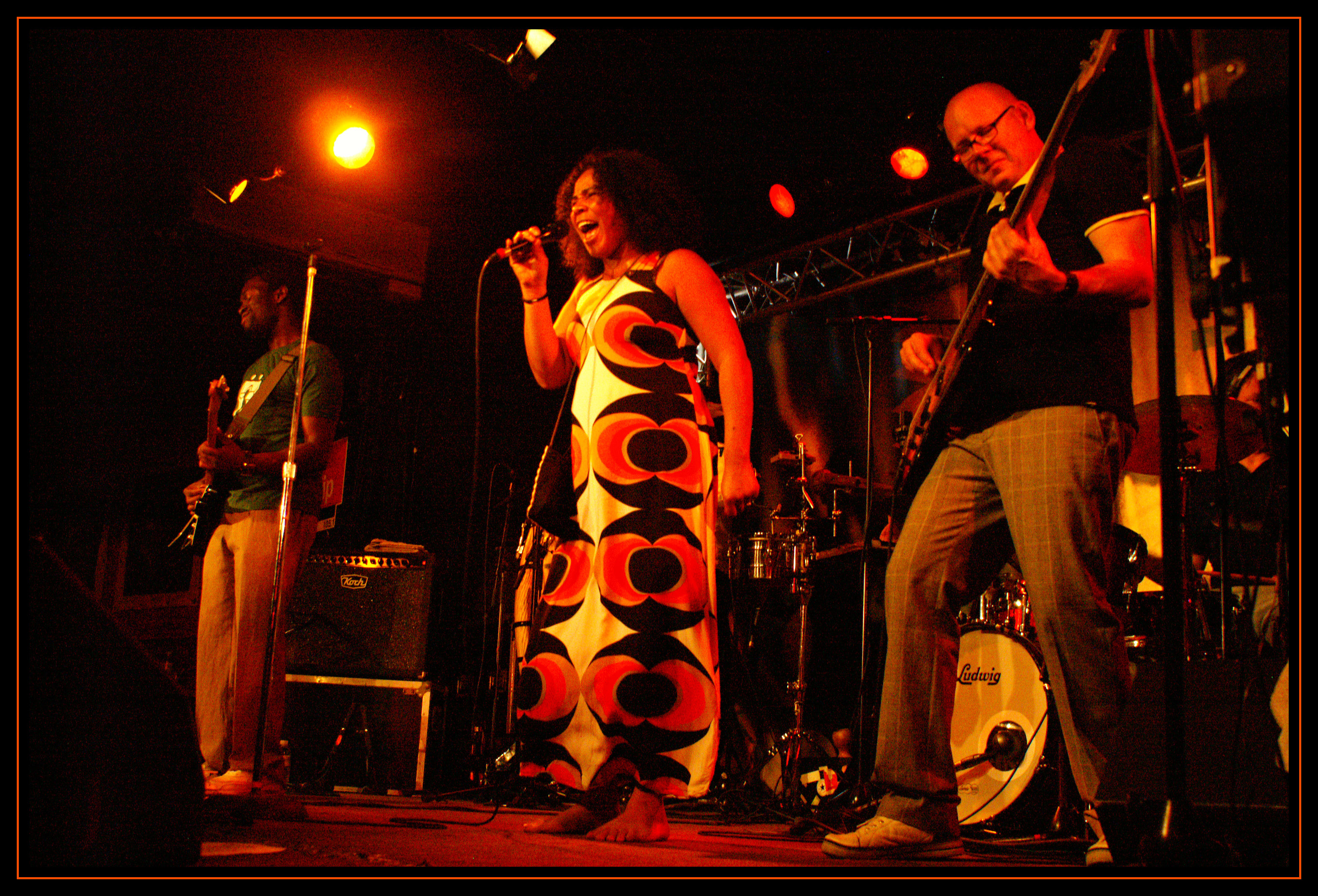
Zuco 103 live at the New Morning (Paris, France)

== Discography ==
=== Albums ===
- Outro Lado (1999)
- Tales Of High Fever (2002)
- One Down, One Up (2003)
- Whaa! (2005)
- After The Carnaval (2008)
- Etno Chic (2016)
- Tripicalismo (2019)
- Telenova (2023)

=== Compilations ===
- The Other Side Of Outro Lado (2001)
- Retouched! After The Carnaval Remixes (2009)

=== EPs ===
- Apocalypso (2015)

=== Singles ===
- "Treasure" (2002)
- "Futebol" (2004)
- "It's A Woman's World" (2005)
- "Na Mangueira" (2005)
