= Lula Pena =

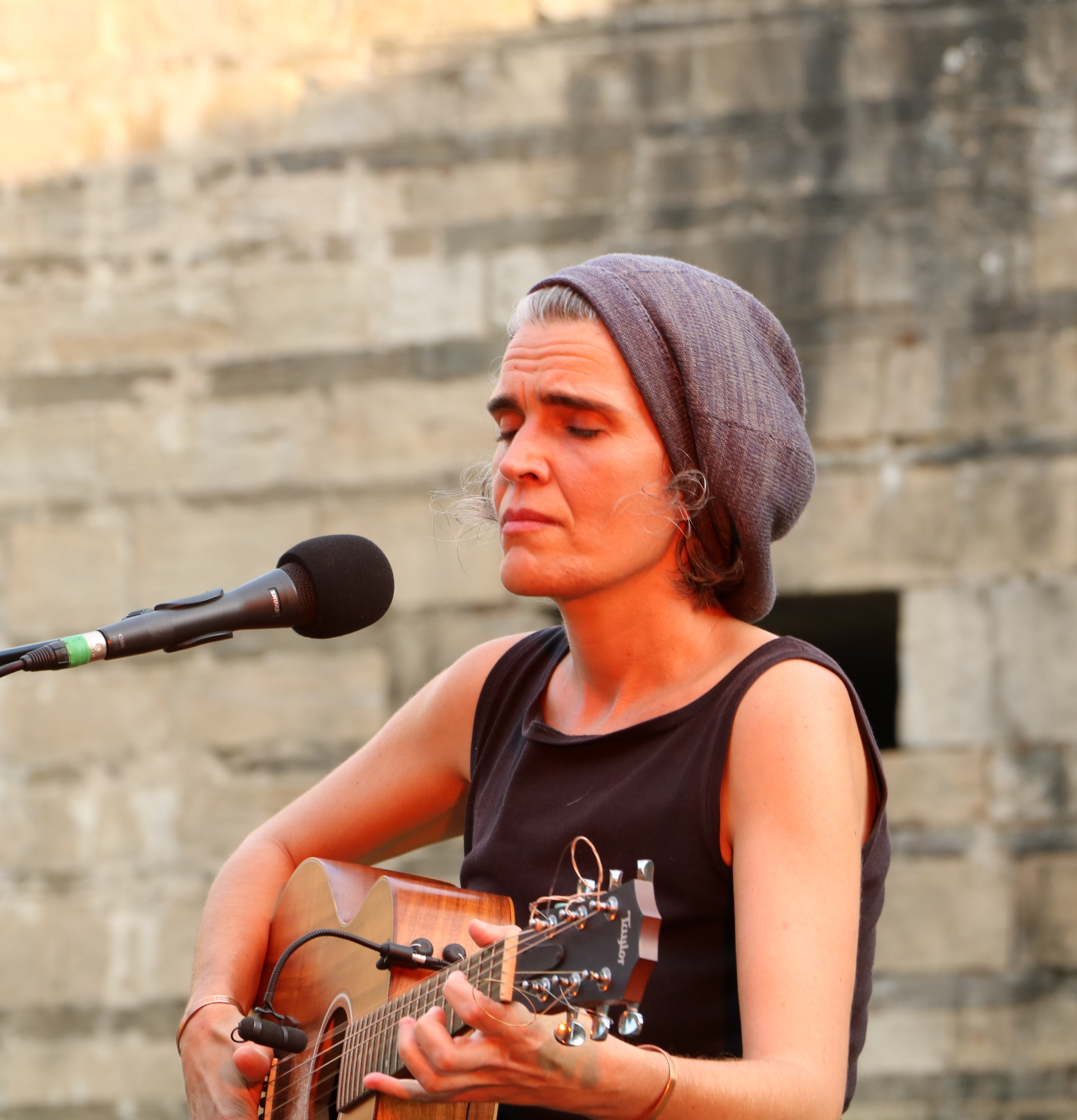
- Lula Pena 2017

Background information
- Born: May 15, 1974 (age 51); Portugal Lisbon
- Genres: Fado
- Occupations: Singer; Composer; Poet
- Instruments: Vocals; Guitar
- Labels: Mbari Música

Lula Pena (born May 15, 1974) is a Portuguese fado singer, composer and poet from Lisbon, Portugal.

== Biography ==
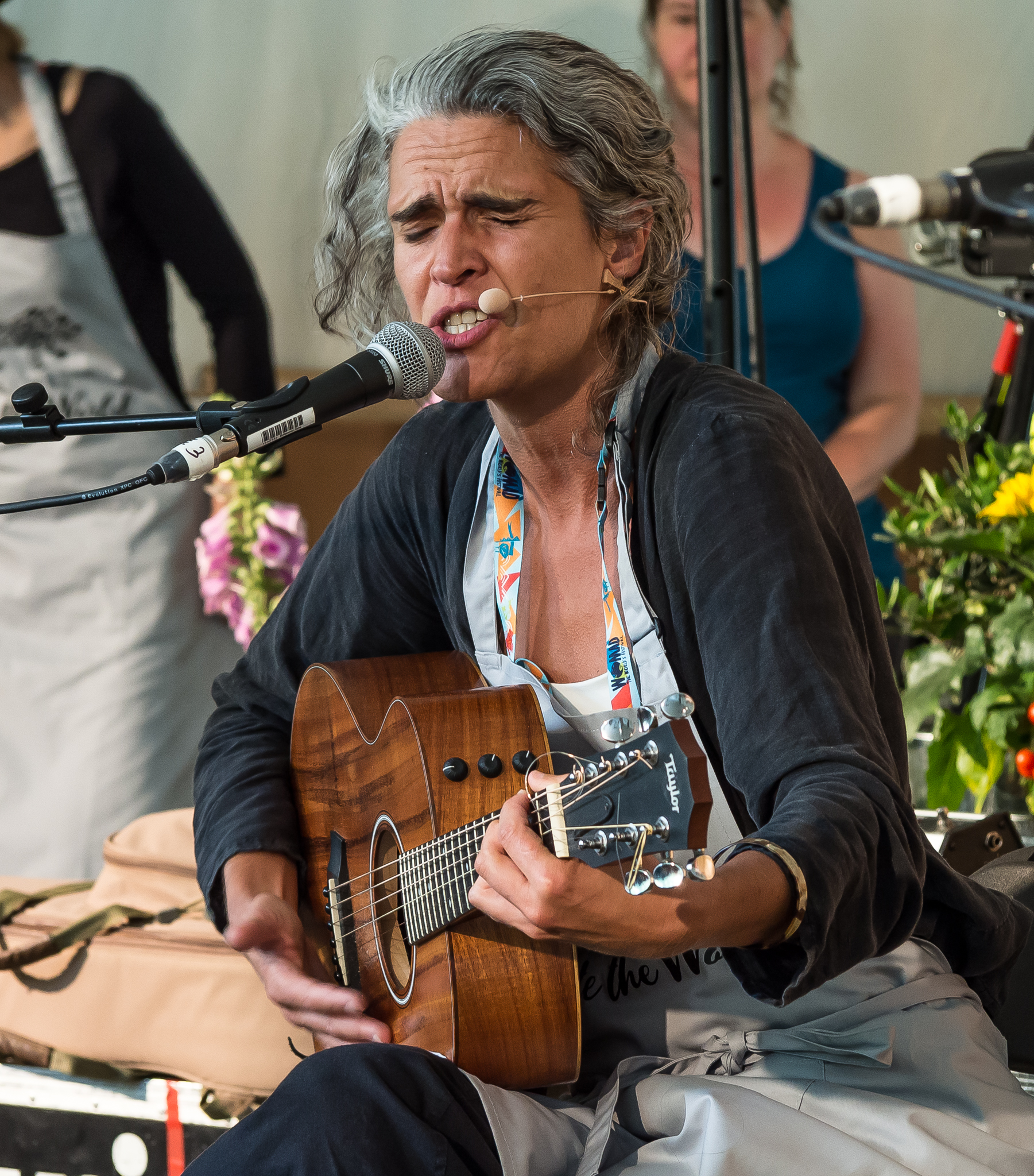
Pena at WOMAD in 2016

As well as fado ("phado" as she prefers), Pena's music is strongly influenced by a range of other types of music, including chanson, flamenco and blues, as well as music from Mexico, Greece and Italy. Lula Pena says her approach to music is “wandering borderless and intuitively through different languages and sounds”. She performed at WOMEX 14 Official Showcase Selection at World Music Expo in October 2014.

Pena appeared at the WOMAD festival in 2016. She also performed on stage at Antiga Fabrica Damm on May 16, 2019, in Barcelona, Spain.

== Discography ==
- Phados (1998)
- Troubadour (2010)
- Archivo Pittoresco (2017)
