= Bossacucanova =

Brazilian bossa nova group

Bossacucanova is a Brazilian musical group which combines traditional bossa nova with electronica. The group is most notable for having been nominated for a Latin Grammy award in 2002 for Best Brazilian Contemporary Pop Album for their album Brasilidade.

Among the group's permanent members is Márcio Menescal, son of bossa nova pioneer Roberto Menescal, who appeared on the Brasilidade album, DJ Marcelinho DaLua and the record producer and sound engineer Alex Moreira. On stage the group has special guests, female singer Cris Delanno, guitarist Flávio Mendes, saxophone player Rodrigo Sha and percussionist Dado Brother.

Alex Moreira (born 1965) died in 2023.

== History ==
Marcelinho Dalua, Alex Moreira and Marcio Menescal formed Bossacucanova in the late 90s, releasing their first album Revisited Classics in 1999 under record label Six Degree Records. The album featured electronic remixes of classic bossa nova songs that were notable for emphasizing the original bossa nova sounds, creating a respectful mixture between the two genres. In 2001, the band released Brasilidade under record label Ziriguiboom, earning them a Latin Grammy Nomination for Best Brazilian Contemporary Pop Album. The album once again featured remixes of traditional bossa nova songs. Since then, the band has released multiple albums, notably 2004's Uma Batida Diferente and 2012's Nossa Onda É Essa! which have garnered millions of streams on Spotify.

== Discography ==
=== Studio albums ===
Title	Year
Revisited Classics	1998
Brasilidade with Roberto Menescal	2001
Impanema Lounge	2004
Uma Batida Diferente	2004
Ao Vivo	2008
Nossa Onda É Essa!	2012
Bossa Got The Blues with Roberto Menescal	2019
As Próprias	2023

Revisited Classics (1998)
Title	Track #
Maria Moita	1
Meditação	2
Vai De Vez	3
Barimbau	4
Influência Do Jazz	5
Se Todos Fossem	6
Só Danço Samba	7
Samba De Uma Nota Só	8
Consolaçao	9
O Barquinho	10
Vai De Vez	11
Meditação	12
Beats For DJs	13

Brasilidade (2001)
Title	Track #
Telefone	1
Nanã	2
Rio	3
Guanabara	4
Água De Beber	5
Garota De Ipanema	6
A Morte De Um Deus De Sal	7
Brasilidade	8
Surfboard	9
Nós E O Mar	10
Mais Perto Do Mar	11
Bye Bye, Brasil	12

Impanema Lounge (2004)
Title	Track #
Lounge W	1
Sanary Sur Mer	2
Bossa 'N' Bass	3
Naonda	4
Super Ambient	5
Niemayer	6
Ultra Samba	7
Batnight	8
Posto 9 1/2	9
Grumari	10
Baixo Gavea	11
Sanary Sur Mer (Extended version)	12

Uma Batida Diferente (2004)
Title	Track #
Bom Dia Rio (Posto 6)	1
Samba Da Minha Terra	2
Essa Moça Tá Diferente	3
Previsão	4
Eu Quero Um Samba	5
Just A Samba	6
Queria	7
Águas De Março	8
Bonita	9
Feitinha Pro Poeta	10
Onde Anda Meu Amor	11
Vai Levando	12

Ao Vivo (2008)
Title	Track #
Eu Quero um Samba (Ao Vivo)	1
Maria Moita (Ao Vivo)	2
Samba da Minha Terra (Ao Vivo)	3
Essa Moça Tá Diferente (Ao Vivo)	4
Samba de Verão (Ao Vivo)	5
Águas de Março (Ao Vivo)	6
Bom Dia Rio (Posto 6) (Ao Vivo)	7
Garota de Ipanema (Ao Vivo)	8
Telefone (Ao Vivo)	9
Balanço Zona Sul (Ao Vivo)	10
Minha Menina (Ao Vivo)	11
Influência do Jazz (Ao Vivo)	12
O Barquinho (Ao Vivo)	13
Nasci para Bailar (Ao Vivo)	14

Nossa Onda É Essa! (2012)
Title	Track #
Adeus América	1
Deixa A Menina	2
Balança (Não Pode Parar!)	3
A Pedida É Samba	4
É Preciso Perdoar	5
Segure Tudo	6
Ficar	7
Waldomiro Pena	8
Deixa Pra Lá	9
Rio De Inspiração	10
Tô Voltando	11

Bossa Got The Blues (2019)
Title	Track #
1937	1
Mandacaru	2
Train To Ipanema	3
Sambalaya	4
Blues Bossa	5
Laudir's Theme	6
Bossa Got The Blues	7
Kalunga Rocket	8
Vou Nessa	9
Galeria Menescal	10

As Próprias (2023)
Title	Track #
A Bossa é Cuca Nova	1
Previsão	2
Brasilidade	3
Rio de Inspiração	4
Balança (Não Pode Parar!)	5
Queria	6
Bom Dia Rio (Posto 6)	7
Just a Samba	8
Ficar (2023)	9
Guanabara	10
Deixa Pra Lá	11

=== Singles and EPs ===
Title	Year
BossaCucaNova (Rdio Sessions)	2015
1937	2019
Minha Namorada	2021
A Bossa e Cuca Nova	2023
Impanema	2025

BossaCucaNova: Rdio Sessions (2015)
Title	Track #
Bom Dia Rio (Posto 6)	1
Garota De Ipanema	2
Maracatu Atômico (Extended Version)	3
Nem Vem Que Não Tem (Não Vem Que Não Tem)	4
Balança (Não Pode Parar !)	5

1937 (2019)
Title	Track #
1937	1

Minha Namorada (2021)
Title	Track #
Minha Namorada	1
Maria Moita	2
Influência do Jazz	3

A Bossa É Cuca Nova (2023)
Title	Track #
A Bossa É Cuca Nova	1

Ipanema (2025)
Title	Track #
Ipanema (Bossacucanova Remix)	1
Ipanema (feat. Marcelinho da Lua) [Dub]	2
Ipanema	3

== Legacy ==
Bossacucanova is remembered for their mix of electronic music and traditional bossa nova. Their signature sound received acclaim from both younger generations and the bossa nova old guard, with specific praise from Paula Morelenbaum for Bossacucanova's electronic remixes.
