= Chicha Libre =

American musical band

Chicha Libre is a Brooklyn-based six-member band founded by Olivier Conan. Its name is a reference to chicha, a corn-based liquor that has been produced in South America since the time of the Incas. It is also the name of a Peruvian musical genre (also known as Peruvian cumbia) on which the band's music is based.

== History ==
Conan was first introduced to chicha music on a trip to Peru in 2005. Their first album, ¡Sonido Amazonico!, was released in 2008 on Barbes Records, a label which Conan runs from his home in Brooklyn. They released their second album, Canibalismo, in 2012, and an EP, Cuatro Tigres, in 2013, both digitally and on vinyl.

The band's original members were Olivier Conan (lead vocalist, cuatro), Josh Camp (DuoVox, keyboards, background vocals), Vincent Douglas (guitar), Greg Burrows (percussion, background vocals, timbales, bongos, guiro, reco-reco), Timothy Quigley (percussion, bongo, shakers, conga) and Nick Cudahy (bass guitar). Additional members are Neil Ochoa (congas) and Karina Colis (timbales). Featured guest artists have included Jose Carballo (a former member of the seminal Peruvian chicha band, Los Hijos del Sol).

== Style ==
The band's music is based on chicha, a fusion of rock and roll and cumbia produced by the native population of the Peruvian Andes and Amazon. This music was most popular in the 1960s and 1970s in northern Peru. Conan has described his band's music as "free-form Chicha" and has said they take many liberties with chicha music.

== Reception ==
Sonido Amazonico received a favorable review from Brendon Griffin in PopMatters. Griffin wrote that "...like the best music of any genre it leaves you wondering about the mystery of it all" and gave the album a rating of 9 out of 10. Jon Lusk wrote on the BBC's website that the album's music was "too self-conscious and contrived to match the fevered originals". Robert Christgau awarded Cuatro Tigres an A− and wrote that the band "acknowledge[s] their true roots" on the EP.

== Discography ==
=== Studio albums ===
==== Sonido Amazonico! (2008) ====
1. Sonido Amazonico
2. Primavera en la Selva
3. Mi Plato de Barro
4. Tres Pasajeros
5. The Hungry song
6. El Borrachito
7. Pavane
8. Six Pieds Sous Terre
9. Un Shipibo en España
10. Indian Summer
11. La Cumbia del Zapatero
12. Popcorn Andino
13. Yo No Fui
14. Gnosienne No. 1

==== Canibalismo (2012) ====
1. La Plata (En Mi Carrito De Lata)
2. Danza Del Millonario
3. El Carnicero De Chicago
4. Muchachita Del Oriente
5. Depresion Tropical
6. Juaneco En El Cielo
7. Intermission
8. L'Âge d'Or
9. Papageno Eléctrico
10. Number 17
11. Lupita En La Selva Y El Doctor
12. The Ride Of The Valkyries (Composed By – Richard Wagner)
13. La Danza De Don Lucho
14. Once Tejones
- Engineers: Jason LaFarge, Joshua Camp, Olivier Conan
- Mastered by: Scott Hull (2)
- Mixed by: Bryce Goggin
- Producers: Joshua Camp, Olivier Conan

=== EP ===
==== Cuatro tigres ====
1. The Guns of Brixton (Strummer, Jones, Headon, Simonon)
2. Rica Chicha (Jaime Moreyra)
3. Alone Again Or (Brian Maclean)
4. La Danza de los Simpsons (Danny Elfman)
- Producer: Olivier Conan and Joshua Camp
- Mixed by: Bryce Goggin at Trout Recording
- Cover: Elliot Túpac
