= Les Nouvelles Polyphonies Corses =

Les Nouvelles Polyphonies Corses is a Corsican revival band, concerned with the indigenous music of Corsica. It is the project of Patrizia Poli and Patrizia Gattaceca, who were heavily involved in the 1970s Corsican Roots Revival movement. Their eponymous debut album, Les Nouvelles Polyphonies Corses (1991), was arranged and produced by Hector Zazou, featuring Manu Dibango on saxophone, Ivo Papasov on clarinet, Richard Horowitz, Jon Hassell on trumpet, Shaymal Maltra on tabla, djembe, and ghatam, John Cale and Ryuichi Sakamoto on piano, with Zazou creating complimentary electronic music . Their collaboration with non-Corsican artists was a decision based on exploring the evolving concept of polyphony. For Les Nouvelles Polyphonies, it was important to "sing polyphony as we feel it today" (Patrizia Poli). The improvisation found on the album provides a conceptual link with the tradition of Corsican indigenous folk music. They are noted for forming a bridge between the traditional style of Corsican folk music and more modern, popular music. They played a critical role in popularizing Corsican folk music, both on a local scale and a more global one.

== Facts about Les Nouvelles Polyphonies Corses ==
- The band were selected to perform live at opening ceremony of 1992 Winter Olympics in Albertville, France.
- Their song "Giramondu" (sung at Albertville) was subsequently used in a Philips advertisement that appeared worldwide.
- The disc was then voted best album of the year in the "traditional music" section of the 1992 Victoires de la Musique (French equivalent of the Grammy Awards).
- The album also sold over 100,000 copies in France.
