= Batida =

Brazilian cocktails made with the national alcoholic drink cachaça

- Type: Cocktail
- Ingredients: Two parts cachaça; One part fruit juice; One tbsp sugar
- Standard drinkware: Zombie glass
- Served: On the rocks: poured over ice
- Preparation: Mix and pour into chilled glass. Serve cold.

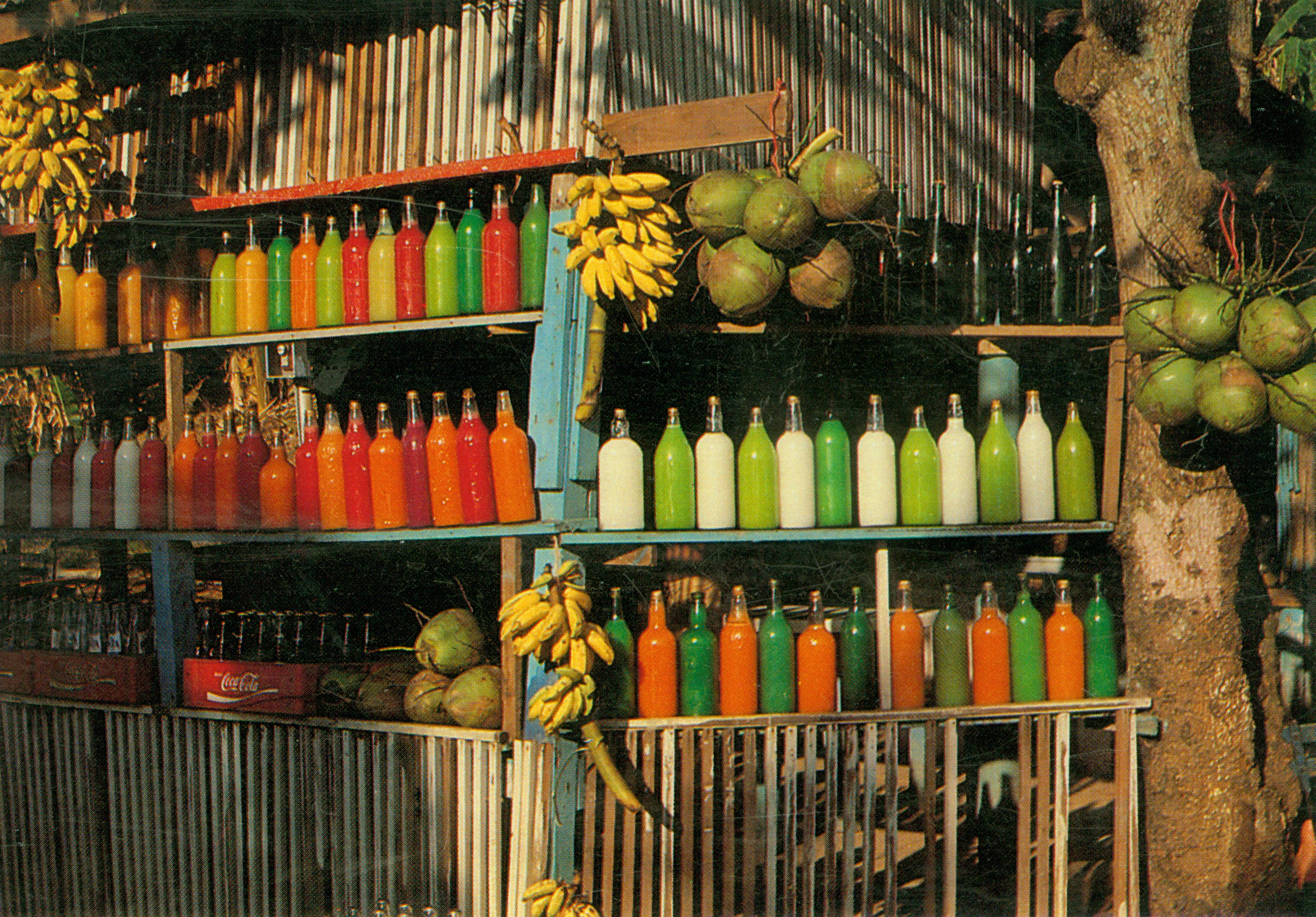
Batida stand in Brazil

Batida is a Brazilian cocktail, and is one of several Brazilian cocktails that are made with the national alcoholic drink cachaça. In Portuguese batida means shaken or milkshake, and the word also means a crash, usually used when referring to a car crash. This beverage is made with cachaça, fruit juice (or coconut milk), and sugar. It is blended or shaken with ice.

The most common fruits used in a batida are lemons, passion fruits and coconuts. A variation is made by adding sweet condensed milk or sour cream. The drink can be made with vodka instead of cachaça (which has limited availability outside of Brazil). The batida has not spread from Brazil to the same extent as other drinks like the caipirinha.

== Traditional recipe ==
- 1 part of fruit juice (or coconut milk)
- 1 table spoon of sugar
- 2 parts of cachaça

Place all the components in a blender and blend very briefly, just to mix all the components. Serve cold or in a tall glass with ice.

An optional recipe is made adding sweet condensed milk and/ or sour cream along with the fruit juice. Like almost all of the cachaça made drinks, some people prefer to replace the cachaça with vodka.

The most popular batida flavours are passion fruit and coconut. However, one also commonly finds guava, mango, or pineapple in these drinks. Many exotic combinations are possible, including apricot and peach, or chocolate and peach, or fig and mint, or fig and orange, or honey and watermelon.

== See also ==
- List of Brazilian dishes
- Cachaça
- Caipirinha
- Caju amigo
- Quentão
- Rabo-de-galo
