= Dominique Dalcan =

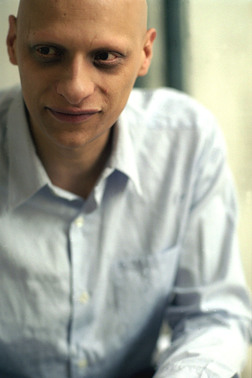

Background information
- Also known as: Snooze, Xarrax Becker
- Born: Beirut, Lebanon
- Genres: Electronic
- Occupations: Musician, composer
- Years active: 1991–present
- Labels: Ostinato, Crammed Discs
- Website: dominiquedalcan.com

Dominique Dalcan (a.k.a. Snooze) is a French electronic musician and film composer. He is the winner of the "victoires de la musique" in 2018 in the category "electronic album".

== History ==
Dominique Dalcan spent his childhood and adolescence in Noisy-le-Grand, a suburb of Paris. He received no real musical education. However, he began composing pieces on the piano as an autodidact, then worked for a while with the Rennes-based group Complot Bronswick. He has been influenced by the composers Harold Budd and Brian Eno.

In 1992 he released his first album Entre l'étoile & le carré on Crammed Discs. He performed his first concert at the Transmusicales festival in Rennes in 1991. His collaboration with Marc Hollander, the founder of this Belgian label, would last a decade. The album is described as a "miracle" of pop music. Dalcan is considered a pioneer of French pop with his mix of electronic and acoustic music.

In 1994, Dominique returned with the album Cannibale which include Le danseur de Java and Brian. The album was influenced by orchestrations from Anglophone music. He worked with the arranger David Whitaker and the musician Bertrand Burgalat. When the album was released, Dominique toured in France with various groups and ended up on the main stage of the Francofolies festival in La Rochelle in 1995.

In 1996, Dalcan established a parallel musical project Snooze. Dominique has been quoted in the English press with Laurent Garnier, Air, Daft Punk or Motorbass. Initially instrumental, The Man in the Shadow is his first album under the name Snooze. The sound mixes dub, jazz, hip hop and drum and bass.

In 1997, he released the album Ostinato. Dominique recorded with Brazilian musicians such as Vinicius Cantuaria, collaborator of Arto Lindsay and Caetano Veloso, Paolo Braga and Cyro Baptista as well as the conductor Clare Fischer, arranger of Prince and João Gilberto among others. The singles from the album are L'air de rien, a duet with the singer Nancy Danino (already present on The Man in the Shadow, Snooze's first album in 1996), Individualistic, and Plus loin mais jusqu'où.

The following year, Dalcan worked for the cinema with Alain Berliner's Ma vie en rose (nominated for a Golden Globe for best foreign film and for best soundtrack for Dominique’s music score).

He returned to electronic music under the pseudonym Snooze with Goingmobile in 2001. Three singers are featured on this album: Nancy Danino, American Nicole Graham, and Deborah Brown. Increased collaboration included mixers such as Autechre, Uwe Schmidt with Señor Coconut and Isolée.

After two years of writing, Snooze's third album entitled Americana was released in January 2005. This was Snooze's third album but the first on its own label Ostinato.

In 2006, Dominique Dalcan released an anthology entitled Music hall which included his greatest pop songs with also some unreleased ones. Dominique was lauded by the daily newspaper Le Monde as "the pioneer of French pop". The same year, he suffered a heart attack. Dominique then took a break from music for two years.

In 2008, he collaborated with the young slam artist Luciole. Dominique Dalcan composes much of his own music. His first album Ombres, released in February 2009, was awarded by L'Académie Charles-Cros.

Throughout his career, Dominique Dalcan has collaborated with both variety artists (Camille, Zazie, Hubert-Felix Thiefaine) and renowned electronic artists (Autechre, Ryuichi Sakamoto, Isolée aka Rajko Müller, Fila Brazillia).

In 2010, Dominique Dalcan released a new single in French, Paratonnerre, and was back on the air in 2011.

In 2013, he opened for Vanessa Paradis during the Love Songs Tour.

In 2014, Dominique released the album Hirundo on Pias.

He also works with video, leading him, among other things, to produce his own stage projections. Today, he incorporates sound design in his installations and intervenes on many projects by consulting music.

In 2017, Dalcan will release his new transversal creation, entitled Temperance. It speaks about his subject of a "post-electronic" universe, in that machines are used as real instruments. On Saturday, February 10, 2018, the album was awarded the Victoire de la Musique award in the category of Electronic or Dance Album of the Year.

In 2019, volume 2 of "Temperance" was released. He is an important part of the French electro scene like Rone. The first single is entitled "Small Black Piece of Field" produced by the artist on the theme of the anthropocene.

He directed the video clip "Done Enough For Your Man", the first extract from the album "Temperance 2" with the participation of the French actress Valérie Kaprisky.

In 2020, for the first time he played "A woman saved my life" at the Centquatre in Paris. This sound and video installation is experienced as an immersive environment. Voices and testimonies intertwine and mix, materializing a narrative with multiple voices, a collective memory. Conducted in collaboration with several musicians and singers from the Arab world, this performance comprises songs in French, English, and Arabic, and blends acoustic instruments from the Near East with the assertive electronic textures that have become Dominique Dalcan's trademark.

In 2020, Dominique took part in the compilation orchestrated by the techno musician Molecule with its opening track Run Around The Block, an ode to support confinement. The profits will go to the Fondation de France to fight against COVID-19. The record was record of the week on France Inter.

== Discography Dominique Dalcan ==
- 1991: Entre l’étoile et le carré
- 1994: Cannibale
- 1996: Cheval de Troie
- 1997: Ma vie en rose (Soundtrack)
- 1998: Ostinato
- 2005: Music-Hall
- 2014: Hirundo

== Discography Snooze ==
- 1997: The Man in the Shadow - (Crammed Discs)
- 2001: Goingmobile - (Crammed Discs)
- 2005: Americana - (Ostinato)

== Discography Temperance ==
- 2017: TEMPERANCE
- 2018: TEMPERANCE Vol 2

== Filmography ==
- 1997: Clueur
- 1997: My Life in Pink
- 2006: Stealth
