= Tuxedomoon discography =

- Studio albums: 11
- EPs: 5
- Soundtrack albums: 3
- Live albums: 2
- Compilation albums: 2
- Singles: 15

This article details the complete discography of American post-punk band Tuxedomoon.

== Studio albums ==
Title	Album details	UK Indie
Half-Mute	Released: March 15, 1980; Label: Ralph - reissued on Cramboy, 1985; Formats: LP	10
Joeboy in Rotterdam (as Joeboy)	Released: 1981; Label: Backstreet Backlash; Formats: LP	—
Desire	Released: 1981 - reissued on Cramboy, 1987; Label: Ralph; Formats: LP	—
Divine	Released: May 1982; Label: Operation Twilight - reissued on Cramboy, 1990; Formats: LP	—
Holy Wars	Released: 1985; Label: Cramboy; Formats: CD, LP	—
Ship of Fools	Released: 1986; Label: Cramboy; Formats: CD, LP	—
You	Released: 1987; Label: Cramboy; Formats: CD, LP	—
The Ghost Sonata	Released: 1991; Label: LTM - reissued on Cramboy, 1997; Formats: CD, LP	—
Joeboy in Mexico (as Joeboy)	Released: 1997; Label: Opción Sónica; Formats: CD	—
Cabin in the Sky	Released: July 20, 2004; Label: Cramboy; Formats: CD	—
Vapour Trails	Released: November 26, 2007; Label: Cramboy; Formats: CD	—

== Soundtrack albums ==
Title	Album details
Bardo Hotel Soundtrack	Released: June 27, 2006; Label: Made to Measure; Formats: CD
Pink Narcissus	Released: April 28, 2014; Label: Cramboy; Formats: CD, LP
Blue Velvet Revisited (with Cult With No Name)	Released: October 16, 2015; Label: Cramboy; Formats: CD, LP

== Live albums ==
Title	Album details
Ten Years in One Night	Released: 1989; Label: Cramboy/PIAS; Formats: CD, LP
Live in St. Petersburg	Released: 2002; Label: Neo Acustica; Formats: CD

== Compilation albums ==
Title	Album details
A Thousand Lives by Picture	Released: 1983; Label: Ralph; Formats: LP
Pinheads on the Move	Released: 1987; Label: Cramboy; Formats: CD, LP
Solve et Coagula	Released: 1991; Label: Cramboy; Formats: CD

== Extended plays ==
Title	Album details
No Tears	Released: 1978; Formats: LP
Scream with a View	Released: 1979; Label: Tuxedomoon; Formats: LP
Time to Lose	Released: July 1982; Label: Les Disques du Crépuscule; Formats: LP
Suite en sous-sol	Released: July 28, 1982; Label: Expanded Music reissued on Cramboy, 1987; Formats: LP
Short Stories	Released: April 1983; Label: Les Disques du Crépuscule; Formats: LP

== Singles ==
- "Joeboy the Electronic Ghost"/"Pinheads on the Move" (1978)
- "Stranger"/"Love/No Hope" (1979)
- "What Use?"/"Crash" (1980)
- "Dark Companion"/"59 to 1 Remix" (1980)
- "Urban Leisure Suite Part IV" (1980)
- "Jinx"/"Incubus (Blue Suite)" (1981)
- "Une Nuit au Fond de la Frayere"/"Egypt" (1981)
- "Ninotchka"/"Again" (1982)
- "What Use?" (remix) (1982)
- "Why Is She Bathing?" (1982)
- "Soma" (1984)
- "Plan Delta" (1986)
- "Boxman (The City)"/"The Train" (1987)
- "You" (new version)/"Atlantis" (remix) (1987)
- "Michael's Theme"/Interview (1988)
