= Solve et Coagula =

Compilation album by Tuxedomoon
- Released: 1991
- Recorded: 1978–1987
- Genre: Post-punk, new wave, experimental rock
- Length: 67:53
- Label: Cramboy
- Producer: Tuxedomoon

Tuxedomoon chronology
The Ghost Sonata (1991)	Solve et Coagula (1991)	Joeboy in Mexico (1997)

Solve et Coagula is a best-of compilation by American post-punk band Tuxedomoon, released in 1991 by Cramboy. A critic at Last Sigh Magazine gave the album a mixed review, calling it "a good introduction to Tuxedomoon's rich output, but it is far from exhaustive."

== Track listing ==
No.	Title	Writer(s)	From album (date)	Length
1.	"East/Jinx"	Steven Brown, Peter Dachert, Blaine L. Reininger, Winston Tong	Desire (1981)	10:00
2.	"What Use?"	Steven Brown, Peter Dachert, Blaine L. Reininger, Winston Tong	Half-Mute (1980)	4:00
3.	"Some Guys"	Steven Brown, Peter Dachert, Luc Van Lieshout	Holy Wars (1985)	4:53
4.	"No Tears"	Steven Brown, Peter Dachert, Blaine L. Reininger	No Tears (1978)	5:40
5.	"The Waltz"	Steven Brown, Peter Dachert, Luc Van Lieshout	Holy Wars (1985)	5:09
6.	"In a Manner of Speaking"	Winston Tong	Holy Wars (1985)	3:28
7.	"Atlantis"	Steven Brown, Peter Dachert	Ship of Fools (1986)	4:57
8.	"Tritone (Musica Diablo)"	Steven Brown, Peter Dachert, Blaine L. Reininger	Half-Mute (1980)	2:48
9.	"Time to Lose"	Steven Brown, Peter Dachert, Blaine L. Reininger, Winston Tong	Time to Lose (1982)	5:03
10.	"L'étranger (Gigue existentielle)"	Steven Brown, Peter Dachert, Blaine L. Reininger, Winston Tong	Suite en sous-sol (1982)	5:42
11.	"The Cage"	Steven Brown, Peter Dachert, Blaine L. Reininger	Short Stories (1983)	4:10
12.	"Desire"	Steven Brown, Peter Dachert, Blaine L. Reininger, Winston Tong	Desire (1981)	7:05
13.	"You" (Christmas mix)	Steven Brown, Ralph Saver	You (1987)	4:58

1993 CD track listing
No.	Title	Writer(s)	From album (date)	Length
1.	"What Use?"	Steven Brown, Peter Dachert, Blaine L. Reininger, Winston Tong	Half-Mute (1980)	4:00
2.	"No Tears"	Steven Brown, Peter Dachert, Blaine L. Reininger	No Tears (1978)	4:58
3.	"The Cage"	Steven Brown, Peter Dachert, Blaine L. Reininger	Short Stories (1983)	4:52
4.	"Some Guys"	Steven Brown, Peter Dachert, Luc Van Lieshout	Holy Wars (1985)	4:53
5.	"Dark Companion" (remix)	Steven Brown, Peter Dachert, Blaine L. Reininger	Dark Companion/59 to 1 7" (1980)	3:57
6.	"In a Manner of Speaking"	Winston Tong	Holy Wars (1985)	3:28
7.	"Atlantis"	Steven Brown, Peter Dachert	Ship of Fools (1986)	4:57
8.	"The Waltz"	Steven Brown, Peter Dachert, Luc Van Lieshout	Holy Wars (1985)	5:09
9.	"L'étranger (Gigue existentielle)"	Steven Brown, Peter Dachert, Blaine L. Reininger, Winston Tong	Suite en sous-sol (1982)	5:42
10.	"Tritone (Musica Diablo)"	Steven Brown, Peter Dachert, Blaine L. Reininger	Half-Mute (1980)	2:47
11.	"East/Jinx"	Steven Brown, Peter Dachert, Blaine L. Reininger, Winston Tong	Desire (1981)	9:59
12.	"Desire"	Steven Brown, Peter Dachert, Blaine L. Reininger, Winston Tong	Desire (1981)	7:03
13.	"59 to 1" (remix)	Steven Brown, Peter Dachert, Blaine L. Reininger	Dark Companion/59 to 1 7" (1980)	3:54
14.	"You" (Christmas mix)	Steven Brown, Ralph Saver	You (1987)	4:59

== Release history ==
Region	Date	Label	Format	Catalog
Belgium	1991	Cramboy	CD	CBoy 1212
Belgium	1993	Cramboy	CD	CBoy 1313
