= Renaldo and the Loaf =

English musical duo

- Origin: Portsmouth, Hampshire, UK
- Genres: Avant-garde; experimental music
- Years active: 1977–1987; 2007; 2013; 2016–present
- Labels: Ralph; Some Bizzare; Do It
- Website: renaldoloaf.com

Renaldo and the Loaf are an English musical duo formed in 1977 consisting of David "Ted the Loaf" Janssen and Brian "Renaldo Malpractice" Poole. The two released six full-length albums, one live album, and three self-produced demos.

== Sound ==
Renaldo & The Loaf attempted to replicate the sound of synthesizers using acoustic instruments. They manipulated tape loops and muffled and detuned their instruments.

== Background ==
=== Formation (1970–1976) ===
David Janssen (not to be confused with the American actor) and Brian Poole met each other at school in the spring of 1970, when they bonded over a love for rock band Tyrannosaurus Rex and began to play guitar.

=== Early Career (1977–1980) ===
The two had been recording together as early as 1977, creating sound experiments that neither considered 'songs'. During this period they, along with friend Terry Nichols, worked on a four part instrumental suite titled 'Segment', which was completed in the spring of 1978.

After deciding to attempt a more song like structure in September 1978, the duo adopted the moniker Plimsollline, and discovered a newspaper ad from a record label named Raw Records asking for artists. The duo responded to this by sending a demo tape, and were quickly signed. At the suggestion of label owner 'Lee', the duo recorded an album and EP titled 'Behind Closed Curtains' and 'Tap Dance In Sushi' between September 1978 and April 1979, but shortly after the completion of the material, Lee and Raw Records disappeared, and the tapes were shelved. This brief encounter with a record label gave them the confidence they needed to approach larger labels like Virgin and Rough Trade. During their correspondence with Rough Trade, Geoff Travis suggested that the duo invest in a good multi-track tape recorder, a piece of equipment that would become essential to the sound of their debut album, Struve & Sneff. By the time the duo began recording Struve & Sneff in April 1979, the two had already adopted the name 'Renaldo & The Loaf'.

The sessions for Struve & Sneff became a routine for Poole & Janssen. They would discuss new material and ideas during the midweek, and meet in Janssen's bedroom to record the next Saturday. They were both heavily inspired by the popular synthesizer bands of the time, but were unable to afford keyboards themselves, and so recreated synth-like noises using tape effects and treated guitars. Struve & Sneff was completed in September 1979 and was sold through mail order between 1979 and 1983 in a limited quantity of 250.

=== Ralph Years (1981–1987) ===
==== Songs for Swinging Larvae (1980–1981) ====
While on Holiday in San Francisco, Brian Poole visited 444 Grove Street, the headquarters of Ralph Records and The Residents. While there, Poole unknowingly met with a member of The Residents, and gave him copy of Struve & Sneff. The Resident listened to the first three tracks, and told him it was excellent. Shortly afterwards, the two began a mail correspondence, where The Resident expressed interest in signing the band to Ralph. During these correspondences, the duo recorded and sent Ralph Records two demo tapes, Songs For The Surgery recorded from November 1979 to Mid 1980, and Hats Off, Gentlemen! completed in Autumn of 1980. These, combined with their debut, were enough for Ralph to sign them, and Jay Clem, representative for the label, met with the group in England. After this, the two started working on their first LP, Songs For Swinging Larvae, recording and writing new songs for it throughout late 1980, as well as overdubbing material from their Ralph demos. The album was finished in November 1980, and production on its follow-up, Arabic Yodeling, began almost immediately afterwards in December.

Lyrically, the album was inspired by classical European literature, with "Medical Man" being a direct adaption of the first chapter of Arthur Conan Doyle's The Sign of the Four, "Spratt's Medium" being inspired by Samuel Beckett's Endgame and "Ow! Stew the Red Shoe!" taking lyrics from four short stories by Beckett found in a collection titled 'First Love'. The album title itself is a play on Frank Sinatra's Songs For Swinging Lovers.

Prior to the album's release, Poole and Janssen travelled to San Francisco in late February to film a music video for Songs For Swinging Larvae in March. The idea was originally to film a video for "Is Guava A Donut?", but Ralph representatives suggested making the video a narrative about a recent abduction story. The video, directed by Graeme Whifer, would combine three songs recorded during the album's sessions, "Spratt's Medium," "Lime Jelly Grass," and an outtake, "Melvyn's Repose." They knew the video would be controversial, but thought it would get them noticed.

After the video was completed The Residents invited the duo for a jam session in their studio. After the session, The Residents suggested that they record an album together in the remaining three days of their visit, through applying overdubs to the session. On the second day, they were split into two groups. Brian Poole and his half of The Residents were set to devise lyrics and singing, while Dave Janssen and his half were set to consider overdubs. On the third day overdubs would be recorded, and on day four it would be mixed. This demo tape was titled 4 Daze but was left incomplete when the two returned to England. A few weeks later, Poole and Janssen were sent a new version of the demo with additional overdubs by The Residents.

Songs For Swinging Larvae was released in the US through Ralph Records on April 10, 1981, and in the UK two months later in June.

==== Arabic Yodelling and Title in Limbo (1982–1983) ====
Following the release of Songs For Swinging Larvae, the two sent another demo tape The Serious Collection, to Ralph Records in July 1982. The material was later developed into much of their third album, Arabic Yodelling.

Arabic Yodelling was inspired by Ubu Roi by Alfred Jarry and the works of Charles Baudelaire, and was the first album by Renaldo & The Loaf to feature a guest musician, violinist Dave Baker, who was a friend of Brian Poole's, who Janssen never met. It was also their first album to feature traditional keyboards, as the group had purchased a Casiotone 202 for use as Renaldo & The Loaf. The album was completed in January 1983. Unlike Songs For Swinging Larvae, Arabic Yodelling would not have a UK release.

When The Residents visited London on their Mole Show tour on June 28, 1983, David and Brian met with The Residents backstage to discuss the advancement of the 4 Daze material. The Residents had time in their schedule to finish it in September, and so three weeks of the month were chosen to complete the album in. Unfortunately, Janssen was unable to get time off to visit San Francisco and so Poole alone attended the sessions, taking with him tape loops created by Dave, a Bouzouki, a Rababa, and a reed instrument known as a Mesmer. Sessions for the album continued over three weeks, with The Residents' usual equipment being in transit since their Leicestershire Mole Show performance in July. They used a Yamaha Keyboard, a 'Resitar' electric guitar, a drum machine and a violin, used by Snakefinger on the track "Africa Tree" The album, Title in Limbo, was released in November 1983.

==== The Elbow Is Taboo (1984–1987) ====
Title in Limbo was the biggest financial success of any of the duo's projects and gave Renaldo and the Loaf the budget to improve their recordings. Brian Poole created a home studio which, unlike Janssen's bedroom they had worked in previously, featured full mixing equipment. Janssen felt this somewhat stifled his creative input, now that he was no longer able to record whenever he felt like. The duo also now had a sampler, a Roland TR-606 drum machine and a Korg SDD-1000 digital delay unit.

They began recording their follow-up to Arabic Yodeling in 1984, with sessions continuing throughout 1985 and finishing in late 1986. During this period the duo released two archival works, a re-edited LP version of Struve & Sneff, which included five outtakes from the original sessions, and, in 1985, a compilation titled Olleh Olleh Rotcod. Rotcod contained rare tracks by the band, as well as two excerpts from the Elbow is Taboo sessions, "Critical/Dance" and the title track.

By the time The Elbow Is Taboo was complete, Ralph were no longer acting as the duo's primary record label, as they had moved on to the UK based Some Bizzare records, Ralph would still release the album in the US, but were significantly less involved in its production. With their previous albums, Poole and Jansseen would begin work on the follow-up as soon as the master tapes had been sent to Ralph, but in this case, the duo were not pleased with the proposed artwork created by Bizarre and had to take new photographs to be used instead. This caused significant delays in the album's release and exhausted the band. They discussed ideas for a follow-up at the time, but found it difficult to start anything. The album was influenced partly by French band Ptôse, whose song "Boule" was covered on the album. "Hambu Ho do," was released as a single from the album.

In 1987 they recorded a cover version of "Haul on the Bowline" for the Ralph Records various artists album Potatoes, shortly before their retirement.

=== Solo Works (1989–2015) ===
Two years after the retirement of Renaldo & The Loaf, Brian Poole began working with Kwesi Marles (Who had assisted Renaldo & The Loaf on the "Hambu Hodo" EP), and formed the group Shouting Hat. They recorded an unreleased cover of 'Ravel's Bolero!' in 1989, and then a track titled 'Jump Jump' on the 1993 TEC Tones compilation Goobers under the name Fiction Friends. Around this same time, TEC Tones began releasing Renaldo & The Loaf's albums on CD.

In 1996 Poole worked with Frank Pahl on two songs, "Value of Slacks", for his album In Cahoots, and "Portsmouth" for his album Remove The Cork In 1998, Title In Limbo was released on CD through Ralph America, followed by a CD issue of the original version of Sturve & Sneff by The Esoteric Music Group. Between 2002 and 2003 Poole also worked with The Moles on two tracks, "Mole in a Hole" and "We Are The Moles". In 2005, he was asked by director and multi-instrumentalist Alex Wroten to collaborate on the end credits music for his film The Human Elbow.

19 years following "Haul on the Bowline", in 2006, Dave Janssen adopted the pseudonym 'The Darkening Scale' and self released two studio within the year The Entomology of Sound and Sonic Archaeology, Janssen also briefly adopted the pseudonym 'Lightness Ascending' between 2007 and 2008.

=== Reunions (2006–2013) ===
The duo were reunited in 2006, to create the Renaldoloaf.co.uk website. A year later, they were commissioned to record three songs for the soundtrack to Kirk Mannican’s Liberty Mug and in 2013, they were asked by Austrian record label Klanggalerie to create a song for the compilation album Section 25: Eigengrau, for which they created "Girls Don't Count (The Critical Mix)"

==== Gurdy Hurding (2016–present) ====
In October 2016 the duo released their first studio album in 30 years, Gurdy Hurding through Klanggalerie. In June 2018 they performed their second ever live show at the label's 25th Anniversary celebration. The following year they released the EP Song of the Lungfish, and in 2020, released two singles relating to the COVID-19 pandemic.

== Influence ==
Notable artists influenced by Renaldo & The Loaf include The Residents, Frank Pahl, and Andrew Liles. The Residents, along with having worked with the duo, covered the three songs featured in the Songs For Swinging Larvae music video for their Icky Flix project in 2001. Andrew Liles collaborated with the duo on his album 'Black Pool' in 2007 and performed songs written by them on the album. Frank Pahl worked with Brian Poole in the 1990s and the two co-wrote the song 'The Value Of Slacks' together. In 2021, Klanggalerie released Hardly Gurning While The World Is Turning, a reworked version of Gurdy Hurding, featuring remixes by various artists such as Cult With No Name, Eric Drew Feldman, Andrew Liles, Section 25, Transglobal Underground, and The Residents.

== Discography ==
Albums

- Songs For Swinging Larvae (Ralph Records) (1981)
- Arabic Yodelling (Ralph Records) (1983)
- Title In Limbo with The Residents (Ralph Records) (1983)
- The Elbow is Taboo (Some Bizzare) (1987)
- Gurdy Hurding (Klanggalerie) (2016)
- Long Time Coming (Klanggalerie) (2018)
- Hardly Gurning While The World Is Turning (Klanggalerie) (2021)

Compilations

Year	Title	Label	Note
1985	Olleh, Olleh Rotcod	Rotcod Productions	Limited to 5,000 copies.
1986	Hambu Hodo	Some Bizzare	EP. Selections from 'The Elbows Is Taboo'
2001	Hambu Ho Do Tak Awa		EP. Recorded in 1987. Copies given to friends of Renaldo.
2014	Behind Closed Curtains	Klanggalerie	Demos from 1978 to 1979
2016	Breadcrumbs	Klanggalerie	Collection of outtakes 1979–2016
2021	Promos 1980	Bandcamp	Combines Songs From The Surgery and Hats Off, Gentlemen!

EPs

Year	Title	Label	Note
1980	Hats Off, Gentlemen!	Rotcod Productions	Demo EP sent to Ralph Records
1986	Hambu Hodo	Some Bizzare	Selections from 'The Elbows Is Taboo'
2001	Hambu Ho Do Tak Awa		Recorded in 1987. Copies given to friends of Renaldo.
2019	Song Of The Lungfish	Psychofon Records	
2021	Medical Man	Rotcod Productions	Three selections from Songs For Swinging Larvae.

Singles

Year	Title	Label
2020	Hambu Lodo	Bandcamp
2020	Hair Apparent	Bandcamp

== Filmography ==
=== Renaldo & The Loaf – 23rd Century Giants (2022) ===
On March 8, 2022, Well Dang Productions released Renaldo & The Loaf – 23rd Century Giants. The film was directed by David Janssen and Alex Wroten. It details the history of Renaldo & The Loaf, including never-before-seen material and long-forgotten novelty items.
