= Short Stories =

Short stories are pieces of prose fiction.

Short Stories may also refer to:

== Music ==
- Short Stories (Harry Chapin album), 1974
- Short Stories (The Statler Brothers album), 1977
- Short Stories (Jon & Vangelis album), 1980
- Short Stories (Tuxedomoon album), 1982
- Short Stories (Kenny Rogers album), 1985
- Short Stories (Kronos Quartet album), 1993
- Short Stories (Miyuki Nakajima album), 2000
- Short Stories (Elisabeth Andreassen album), 2005
- Short Stories (EP), a 1983 EP by American post-punk band Tuxedomoon

== Other uses ==
- Short Stories (film), 2012 Russian film
- Short Stories (magazine), an American pulp magazine published from 1890 to 1959
- Short Stories, a 1954 collection by O. E. Middleton

== See also ==
- Short Story (disambiguation)
