= Cabin in the Sky =

Cabin in the Sky may refer to:

- Cabin in the Sky (musical), a 1940 musical
- Cabin in the Sky (film), a 1943 film
- Cabin in the Sky (Curtis Fuller album), 1962
- Cabin in the Sky (Tuxedomoon album), 2004
- Cabin in the Sky (De La Soul album), 2025
