= Pinheads on the Move =

Compilation album by Tuxedomoon
- Released: 1987
- Recorded: 1977 – 1983
- Studio: Daylight Studios (Brussels, BE)
- Genre: Post-punk, experimental rock
- Length: 87:31
- Label: Cramboy
- Producer: Peter Dachert

Tuxedomoon chronology
You (1987)	Pinheads on the Move (1987)	Ten Years in One Night (Live) (1989)

Professional ratings
Review scores
Source	Rating
Allmusic	4/5 stars

Pinheads on the Move is a compilation album by the American post-punk band Tuxedomoon, released in 1987 by Cramboy. Containing recordings made between 1977 and 1983, the album comprises early singles, rehearsals, live recordings and other rarities. The CD issue has an abridged track listing, removing four songs from the album.

== Track listing ==
Side one
No.	Title	Writer(s)	Length
1.	"Pinheads on the Move"	Steven Brown, Blaine L. Reininger	2:50
2.	"Joeboy the Electronic Ghost"	Steven Brown, Blaine L. Reininger	2:55
3.	"The Stranger"	Steven Brown, Blaine L. Reininger, Winston Tong	5:10
4.	"Jingle 7"	Steven Brown, Peter Dachert, Blaine L. Reininger	0:11
5.	"Love/No Hope"	Steven Brown, Peter Dachert, Blaine L. Reininger	5:20
6.	"Rhythm Loop"	Steven Brown, Blaine L. Reininger	5:24

Side two
No.	Title	Writer(s)	Length
1.	"In Heaven"	David Lynch	3:21
2.	"I Heard It Through the Grapevine" (Marvin Gaye cover)	Marvin Gaye	5:33
3.	"Fifth Column"	Blaine L. Reininger	2:02
4.	"Touched"	Steven Brown, Blaine L. Reininger	2:15
5.	"Waterfront Seat"	Steven Brown, Peter Dachert, Blaine L. Reininger	4:27
6.	"Une nuit au fond de la frayère"	Steven Brown, Peter Dachert	3:10

Side three
No.	Title	Writer(s)	Length
1.	"I Left My Heart in San Francisco"	Steven Brown, Blaine L. Reininger	1:04
2.	"Everything You Want"	Michael Belfer, Steven Brown	4:07
3.	"Next to Nothing"	Steven Brown, Blaine L. Reininger, Winston Tong	2:41
4.	"Egypt"	Steven Brown	4:37
5.	"Over His Head"	Steven Brown, Blaine L. Reininger	3:38
6.	"Martial/This Land"	Steven Brown, Peter Dachert, Luc Van Lieshout	6:50

Side four
No.	Title	Writer(s)	Length
1.	"Rhumba"	Steven Brown, Blaine L. Reininger	5:43
2.	"Jingle 6"	Steven Brown, Peter Dachert, Blaine L. Reininger	0:08
3.	"How Strange"	Steven Brown, Blaine L. Reininger, Winston Tong	6:00
4.	"Straight Line Forward"	Steven Brown, Peter Dachert, Blaine L. Reininger, Ricky Williams	3:12
5.	"Jingle 10"	Steven Brown, Peter Dachert, Blaine L. Reininger	0:10
6.	"Pinheads on the Move" (Reprise)	Steven Brown, Blaine L. Reininger	6:43

CD track listing
No.	Title	Writer(s)	Length
1.	"Pinheads on the Move"	Steven Brown, Blaine L. Reininger	2:51
2.	"Joeboy the Electronic Ghost"	Steven Brown, Blaine L. Reininger	2:57
3.	"The Stranger"	Steven Brown, Blaine L. Reininger, Winston Tong	5:13
4.	"Jingle 7"	Steven Brown, Peter Dachert, Blaine L. Reininger	0:15
5.	"Love/No Hope"	Steven Brown, Peter Dachert, Blaine L. Reininger	5:23
6.	"In Heaven"	David Lynch	3:23
7.	"I Heard It Through the Grapevine" (Marvin Gaye cover)	Marvin Gaye	5:32
8.	"Fifth Column"	Blaine L. Reininger	2:08
9.	"Touched"	Steven Brown, Blaine L. Reininger	2:16
10.	"Waterfront Seat"	Steven Brown, Peter Dachert, Blaine L. Reininger	4:29
11.	"Une nuit au fond de la frayère"	Steven Brown, Peter Dachert	2:52
12.	"I Left My Heart in San Francisco"	Steven Brown, Blaine L. Reininger	1:06
13.	"Everything You Want"	Michael Belfer, Steven Brown	4:10
14.	"Next to Nothing"	Steven Brown, Blaine L. Reininger, Winston Tong	2:47
15.	"Egypt"	Steven Brown	4:40
16.	"Over His Head"	Steven Brown, Blaine L. Reininger	3:46
17.	"Martial/This Land"	Steven Brown, Peter Dachert, Luc Van Lieshout	6:52
18.	"Straight Line Forward"	Steven Brown, Peter Dachert, Blaine L. Reininger, Ricky Williams	3:12
19.	"Jingle 10"	Steven Brown, Peter Dachert, Blaine L. Reininger	0:07
20.	"Pinheads on the Move" (Reprise)	Steven Brown, Blaine L. Reininger	6:37

== Personnel ==
Adapted from the Pinheads on the Move liner notes.

Tuxedomoon

- Steven Brown – alto saxophone, soprano saxophone, clarinet, keyboards, synthesizer, percussion, vocals
- Peter Dachert (as Peter Principle) – bass guitar, electric guitar, synthesizer, percussion, production
- Blaine L. Reininger – violin, viola, acoustic guitar, electric guitar, synthesizer, keyboards, percussion
- Winston Tong – vocals

Additional musicians

- Michael Belfer – guitar (B5, C2, D4)
- Greg Langston – drums (B1, B4), percussion (A5)
- Luc van Lieshout – trumpet (C6)
- Victoria Lowe – vocals (A2)
- Paul Zahl – drums (A3, A5)

Production and additional personnel

- Uri Barak – engineering
- Vincent Kenis – engineering
- Patrick Roques – cover art, design, photography
- Mark Sangerman – photography
- Tom Tadlock – production (A1–A3), recording (A6, C3, D1)

== Release history ==
Region	Date	Label	Format	Catalog
Belgium	1987	Cramboy	CD, LP	CBoy 9090
