= Ten Years in One Night (Live) =

Live album by Tuxedomoon
- Released: 1989
- Recorded: May 7, 1985 – July 26, 1988
- Genre: Post-punk, experimental rock
- Length: 89:57
- Label: Cramboy/PIAS

Tuxedomoon chronology
Pinheads on the Move (1987)	Ten Years in One Night (Live) (1989)	The Ghost Sonata (1991)

Ten Years in One Night (Live) is a live album by American post-punk band Tuxedomoon, released in 1989 by Cramboy and Play It Again Sam. The CD issue has an abridged track listing, removing three songs from the album.

== Track listing ==
Side one
No.	Title	Writer(s)	Length
1.	"Michael's Theme"	Nino Rota	2:04
2.	"Burning Trumpet"	Ivan Georgiev	6:40
3.	"Reedin' - Rightin' - Rhythmatic"	Steven Brown, Peter Dachert, Luc Van Lieshout	4:21
4.	"The Waltz"	Steven Brown, Peter Dachert, Luc Van Lieshout	5:13
5.	"In a Manner of Speaking"	Winston Tong	3:10

Side two
No.	Title	Writer(s)	Length
1.	"The Cage"	Steven Brown, Blaine L. Reininger	4:46
2.	"Everything You Want"	Michael Belfer, Steven Brown	5:49
3.	"Dark Companion"	Steven Brown, Peter Dachert, Blaine L. Reininger	4:16
4.	"Courante marocaine"	Steven Brown, Peter Dachert, Blaine L. Reininger	7:20

Side three
No.	Title	Writer(s)	Length
1.	"Litebulb Overkill"	Steven Brown, Peter Dachert, Blaine L. Reininger	2:48
2.	"Desire"	Steven Brown, Peter Dachert, Blaine L. Reininger, Winston Tong	7:05
3.	"In The Name of Talent (Italian Western II)"	Steven Brown, Peter Dachert, Blaine L. Reininger, Winston Tong	9:08
4.	"Nervous Guy"	Steven Brown, Peter Dachert, Blaine L. Reininger	4:09

Side four
No.	Title	Writer(s)	Length
1.	"Pinheads on the Move"	Steven Brown, Blaine L. Reininger	6:24
2.	"No Tears"	Steven Brown, Peter Dachert, Blaine L. Reininger	8:12
3.	"In Heaven"	David Lynch	3:34
4.	"Nazca"	Steven Brown, Peter Dachert, Blaine L. Reininger	4:58

CD track listing
No.	Title	Writer(s)	Length
1.	"Michael's Theme"	Nino Rota	2:04
2.	"Burning Trumpet"	Ivan Georgiev	6:40
3.	"The Waltz"	Steven Brown, Peter Dachert, Luc Van Lieshout	5:13
4.	"In a Manner of Speaking"	Winston Tong	3:10
5.	"The Cage"	Steven Brown, Blaine L. Reininger	4:46
6.	"Everything You Want"	Michael Belfer, Steven Brown	5:49
7.	"Courante marocaine"	Steven Brown, Peter Dachert, Blaine L. Reininger	7:20
8.	"Litebulb Overkill"	Steven Brown, Peter Dachert, Blaine L. Reininger	2:48
9.	"Desire"	Steven Brown, Peter Dachert, Blaine L. Reininger, Winston Tong	7:05
10.	"Nervous Guy"	Steven Brown, Peter Dachert, Blaine L. Reininger	4:09
11.	"Pinheads on the Move"	Steven Brown, Blaine L. Reininger	6:24
12.	"No Tears"	Steven Brown, Peter Dachert, Blaine L. Reininger	8:12
13.	"In Heaven"	David Lynch	3:34
14.	"Nazca"	Steven Brown, Peter Dachert, Blaine L. Reininger	4:58

== Personnel ==
Adapted from the Pinheads on the Move liner notes.

Tuxedomoon

- Steven Brown
- Peter Dachert
- Bruce Geduldig
- Ivan Georgiev
- Luc Van Lieshout
- Blaine L. Reininger
- Winston Tong
- Paul Zahl

Production and additional personnel

- Luc Gerlo – engineering
- Frankie Lievaart – engineering
- James Neiss – executive producer

== Release history ==
Region	Date	Label	Format	Catalog
Belgium	1989	Cramboy/PIAS	CD, LP	PB 5921
