= Blue Velvet Revisited =

2016 documentary film

- Directed by: Peter Braatz
- Written by: Peter Braatz
- Produced by: Peter Braatz
- Cinematography: Peter Braatz
- Edited by: Peter Braatz
- Music by: John Foxx; Erik Stein
- Release date: 7 October 2016 (BFI London Film Festival)
- Running time: 86 minutes
- Language: English

Blue Velvet Revisited is a 2016 documentary film directed and edited by Peter Braatz. Using a montage technique, it documents the making of David Lynch's critically acclaimed film, Blue Velvet, using a combination of filmed footage, photographs and interviews captured on set by Braatz, with an accompanying soundtrack by Cult With No Name, Tuxedomoon and John Foxx.

== Background and production ==
Peter Braatz had worked as a musician fronting the German avant-garde punk band S.Y.P.H. before moving to Berlin in the early eighties to study film. He first contacted Lynch in 1983, sending a critique of Lynch's The Elephant Man with a proposal to interview him to Mel Brooks, who had produced the film. Lynch wrote back several months later, and they exchanged letters over the following two years. In 1985, out of the blue, Lynch invited Braatz to document the making of his new film in Wilmington, North Carolina, which became Blue Velvet. Braatz travelled with a friend and stayed on set for three months, taking only Super 8 cameras and reels (due to cost and weight), a tape recorder and a camera. Lynch granted Braatz unrestricted access to the set, cast and crew, with only some restrictions placed on where Braatz could film Isabella Rossellini as she was still under contract to Lancome.

Braatz first released a film based on what he documented as No Frank in Lumberton in 1988. The film was avant-garde in its approach and had limited distribution through the German television station ZDF and a handful of festivals. In 2013, Braatz was in his studio listening to the track "As Below" by British band Cult With No Name. He was inspired to revisit his footage and put together a proposal based on this piece of music for a new film using his archived Blue Velvet footage. The German Film Foundation and the Slovenian Bela-Film provided funding for the film.

Before editing began, Braatz commissioned Cult With No Name to produce the soundtrack, as it was always his intention to edit to music as much of his material was silent, having been filmed using Super 8. Cult With No Name invited Tuxedomoon and John Foxx to join them in producing the soundtrack, released on Crammed Discs in 2015 on vinyl and CD a year before the film. The soundtrack received significant press coverage and was met with highly positive reviews, with The Wire describing it as "... evocative, dreamy, dark and dynamic.." The CD included a booklet of previously unreleased photographs taken on set. "No News", the song that closes Blue Velvet Revisited and did not appear on the soundtrack, was subsequently released by the Cult With No Name on their Heir of the Dog album in 2017.

Editing and production of the film took over a year in total. The film's Opening and chapter titles were provided by acclaimed graphic designer Jonathan Barnbrook, most famous for his work with David Bowie. Braatz himself dubbed the film "a meditation on a movie", making an important distinction between his approach and a conventional documentary with narration.

== Release ==
Blue Velvet Revisited premiered at the Institute of Contemporary Arts as part of the BFI London Film Festival on 7 October 2016. This coincided with the 30th anniversary of the release of the original film. The next day, at Lynch's request, the film received its US premiere at Lynch's Festival of Disruption. A Q+A with Laura Dern and Kyle MacLachlan followed the screening. Since then, the film has appeared in many notable festivals, galleries and cinemas worldwide, including CPH: DOX, Doc NYC, and MALBA.

In February 2019, The Criterion Collection announced a deluxe reissue of Blue Velvet on DVD and Blu-ray with Blue Velvet Revisited included as an extra. This was followed by a 4K and Blu-Ray release in the UK through Arrow Films in 2026.

In 2020, the track "Lumberton" from the soundtrack of Blue Velvet Revisited, was licensed to be used in the HBO series The New Pope, starring Jude Law and John Malkovich.

== Reception ==
The film gained positive reviews. On the review aggregator website Rotten Tomatoes, 83% of 6 critics' reviews are positive, with an average rating of 7/10.

The Hollywood Reporter described the film as "... a quietly mesmerizing sensory experience, with a distinctive rhythm and look that makes it a stand-alone artwork rather than a mimetic mirror of its subject." Sam Gray of The Upcoming went further and commented, "With a terrific soundtrack and its insightful, rare footage, Blue Velvet Revisited is nirvana for Lynch nerds, though even those with a perfunctory interest in filmmaking could do with seeing this fascinating gem."

The Guardian have placed Blue Velvet Revisited at #11 in its list of the top 20 best 'making of' documentaries.
