= Cartoon Art Museum =

Museum dedicated to comics and cartoons

- Location within San Francisco County Location within California Location within the United States
- Established: 1984
- Location: 781 Beach Street, San Francisco, California
- Coordinates: 37.8062666°N 122.4238831°W
- Type: The art of comics and cartoons
- Collection size: 6,000 pieces
- Director: Summerlea Kashar
- Website: www.cartoonart.org

The Cartoon Art Museum (CAM) was a California art museum that specialized in the art of comics and cartoons. It was the only museum in the Western United States dedicated to the preservation and exhibition of all forms of cartoon art. The permanent collection featured some 7,000 pieces as of 2015, including original animation cels, comic book pages and sculptures.

Until September 2015, the museum was located in the Yerba Buena Gardens cultural district of San Francisco, in the South of Market neighborhood. It reopened in October 2017 in a new location in the Fisherman's Wharf area. The museum closed in August 2026.

== History ==
The Museum was founded in 1984 by comic art enthusiasts, with its primary founder being Malcolm Whyte, the publisher of Troubador Press. CAM's first incarnation had no fixed location, instead organizing showings at other local museums and corporate spaces. In 1987, with the help of an endowment from cartoonist Charles Schulz, it established a home on the second floor of the San Francisco Call-Bulletin Building in the South of Market (SoMa) area.

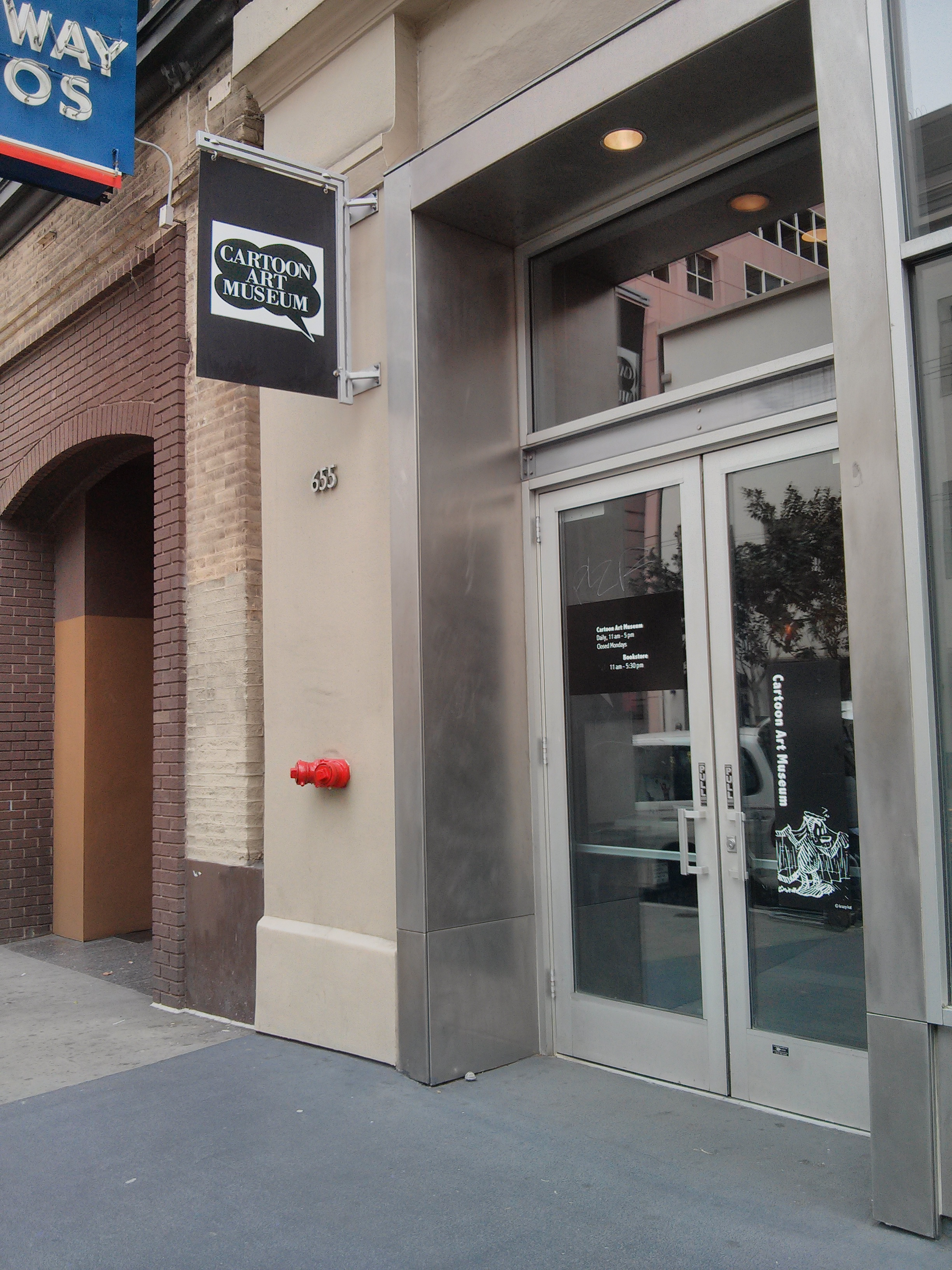
The Cartoon Art Museum entrance at its previous location, 655 Mission Street

In late 1994 the museum temporarily closed while it moved locations again, re-opening in summer 1995. Primary founder Malcolm Whyte retired from the museum's board of directors around the same time.

In 1997, the museum suffered through serious financial difficulties, and was almost forced to close, despite a new endowment fund from the Schulz Foundation.

Jenny E. Robb served as curator of the Cartoon Art Museum from 2000 to 2005. (She subsequently became curator of the Billy Ireland Cartoon Library & Museum in Columbus, Ohio.) Summerlea Kashar has been the executive director since 2010.

In 2001, the museum moved to a ground-floor location at 655 Mission Street in SoMa, which had been vacated by the Friends of Photography Ansel Adams Center. It closed the location in mid-September 2015 after the lease expired; the owners more than doubled the rent.

In late 2016, the museum signed a 10-year lease on a historic 8,000-square-foot brick building a block away from Ghiradelli Square. Almost a year later, in late October 2017, the Cartoon Art Museum finally reopened its doors at its new location with three new exhibitions, including a retrospective of the San Francisco cartoonist Raina Telgemeier, a tribute exhibition of Mike Mignola's Hellboy, and the emerging artist showcase featuring Nidhi Chanani.

Impacted by COVID-19 and the slow recovery of tourism in San Francisco, the Cartoon Art Museum announced in July 2026 that it would not renew its lease, and closed on August 2, 2026. The organization is considering future plans for its collection. The museum's executive director said the closure may not be permanent, "We will take this time to recharge, reset and consider what comes next."

== Sparky Award ==
Over the years, the Museum has presented the Sparky Award (after the nickname of Charles M. Schulz), in honor of the lifetime achievement of prominent creators in the fields of cartooning and animation who "embody the talent, innovation and humanity of Schulz." The award, which is co-sponsored by the Charles M. Schulz Museum, includes a statuette of Snoopy holding a pen and leaning on an inkwell. (The CAM Sparky Award is not connected to the award of the same name presented at the Slamdance Film Festival.)

The award debuted in 1998, and multiple winners were announced each year until 2001. After a six-year hiatus, the award was again presented in 2007. The most recent Sparky Award was given in 2022.

The Sparky Award has been presented at various venues, including San Diego Comic-Con and the New York Comic Con.

List of Sparky Award winners:

- 1998 – Charles M. Schulz, Chuck Jones, and John Lasseter
- 1999 – Sergio Aragonés, Gus Arriola, Carl Barks, and Dale Messick
- 2000 – Ward Kimball, Stan Lee, and Morrie Turner
- 2001 – John Severin, Will Eisner, Phil Frank, Lou Grant, Gary Larson, and Bill Melendez
- 2007 – Creig Flessel
- 2008 – Gene Colan (and, in an earlier ceremony, Malcolm Whyte)
- 2010 – Mort Walker
- 2011 – Jerry Robinson
- 2015 – Ron Turner; presented in conjunction with the first annual San Francisco Comics Fest
- 2017 – Jeff Smith; presented at the Charles M. Schulz Museum
- 2022 – Raina Telgemeier; presented at the Charles M. Schulz Museum
- 2025 – Paige Braddock

== Exhibitions ==
The Museum hosted nine to 12 major exhibitions annually, along with classes for children and adults. It also offered lectures and operated a research library, a classroom and a bookstore.
