= Suite en sous-sol =

EP by Tuxedomoon
- Released: July 28, 1982
- Recorded: 1982
- Studio: L.B.O. (Brussels, BE)
- Genre: Post-punk, experimental rock
- Length: 27:34
- Label: Expanded Music
- Producer: Gilles Martin, Tuxedomoon

Tuxedomoon chronology
Time to Lose (1982)	Suite en sous-sol (1982)	Short Stories (1983)

Suite en sous-sol is an EP by American post-punk band Tuxedomoon, released on July 28, 1982, by Expanded Music. The album was issued on CD in 1986 by Cramboy, bundled together with Time to Lose and Short Stories.

== Track listing ==
All tracks are written by Steven Brown, Peter Dachert, Blaine L. Reininger and Winston Tong.

Side one
No.	Title	Length
1.	"Prelude"	1:19
2.	"Allemande Blue"	6:01

Side two
No.	Title	Length
1.	"Courante Marocaine"	7:42

Side three
No.	Title	Length
1.	"Sarabande en bas de l'escalier"	4:20
2.	"Polonaise mecanique"	2:24

Side four
No.	Title	Length
1.	"L'étranger (Gigue existentielle)"	5:48

1986 CD issue bonus tracks
No.	Title	Length
7.	"Time to Lose" (from Time to Lose)	5:11
8.	"Music No. 2" (from Time to Lose)	3:32
9.	"Blind" (from Time to Lose)	7:31
10.	"The Cage" (from Short Stories)	4:16
11.	"This Beast" (from Short Stories)	5:26

== Personnel ==
Adapted from the Suite en sous-sol liner notes.

Tuxedomoon

- Steven Brown – clavinet, saxophone, keyboards, lead vocals (C1), piano (C2)
- Peter Dachert (as Peter Principle) – bass guitar, guitar, drum programming, percussion, effects
- Blaine L. Reininger – violin, clavinet, keyboards, bass guitar, lead vocals (A2)

Additional musicians

- Slugfinger Lipton – guitar (A2)
- Khessassi Mohammed – oud (B)
- Miri Mohammed – goblet drum (B)
- Winston Tong – lead vocals (D)

Production and additional personnel

- Gilles Martin – production
- Jean-François Octave – cover art, design
- Tuxedomoon – production

== Release history ==
Region	Date	Label	Format	Catalog
Italy	1982	Expanded Music	LP	EX 38
Belgium	1986	Cramboy	CD, LP	CBoy 8081
