= David Haneke =

Austrian video designer (born 1965)

David Haneke (born August 13, 1965, in Vienna, Austria) is an Austrian video designer, director, and camera operator.

== Life ==
David Haneke is the son of Austrian film director Michael Haneke. He grew up in Vienna, where he graduated from a Waldorf School and studied cello under Professor Wolfgang Ebert from 1974 to 1984. He moved to Amsterdam in 1985 and lived there until 2005. In 1992, he graduated from the Academy of Theater and Dance at Amsterdam University of the Arts (Mime School). Haneke has been living in Switzerland with his wife and two children since 2005.

== Career ==
The focus of his work is on stage video designs, which are projected onto various surfaces as integral parts of the mise-en-scène of opera, theater, and dance performances. They are composed of pre-recorded, animated, or real-time-generated visual sequences.

His visual art covers a broad spectrum, ranging from stage video design and short films to innovative video installations for museum spaces.

David Haneke has created video designs for various international opera and theater houses, including the Welsh National Opera, San Francisco Opera, and Theater an der Wien where he has worked with directors David Pountney, Torsten Fischer, Nicola Raab, and Roland Geyer, among others.

In 2016 David Haneke replaced the late video artist Bruce Geduldig as a member of US cult band Tuxedomoon on their Half-Mute European tour.

== Work ==
In 1979, he played Martin Beranek in the Michael Haneke film Lemmings.

While appearing as a performer in various Dutch theater productions and short films, his work increasingly focused on stage video designs. He also created several short films, including Humming Wires and the De Architect en het water trilogy about three water purification plants designed by Dutch architect (Rijksbouwmeester) Wim Quist.

Between 1993 and 2000 he performed extensively with BEWTH, a movement theater group that worked with specific architectural spaces.

From 1996, he created numerous video projection designs for theater, dance, and opera stages.
