= Malcolm Whyte =

American author, editor and publisher

Malcolm Whyte (born 1933) is an author, editor, publisher, and founder of the Cartoon Art Museum in San Francisco. He has produced nearly 200 books, 45 of which he has written or co-written. His taste is for unique, offbeat ideas with a sense of humor and produced with an eye for color and graphics, as represented by The Original Old Radio Game (possibly the world's first trivia book) from 1965 to Maxon: Art Out of Chaos, FU (Fantagraphics Underground) Press, 2018. Whyte lives in Marin County, California. His wife, author Karen Cross Whyte, died in 2025.

== Troubador Press ==
Main article: Troubador Press

Whyte founded Troubador Press in 1956 as a job printer and designer/printer of greeting cards. In 1967 the press published its first book, The Fat Cat Coloring & Limerick Book with art by Donna Sloan and verses by Whyte.

Troubador incorporated in 1970, ceased greeting card manufacturing and became a full-time book publisher, producing scores of critically acclaimed educational books for children (game books, activity books, elaborate color-and-story books), specialty cookbooks (Complete Yogurt Cookbook and The Original Diet, both by raw vegetarian pioneer Karen Cross Whyte), and art books (The Scrimshander and the initial edition of Great Comic Cats). Whyte worked with licenses from Harry Abrams & Co. (several Gnomes books), TSR, Inc. (Dungeons & Dragons), and Edward Gorey (Gorey Games, Gorey Cats Paper Dolls).

In 1982 Whyte sold Troubador, which is now a subsidiary of Penguin-Putnam, and continued to produce Troubador books for the new owners until 1994. Whyte wrote educational text for many of the books.

=== Troubador Press artists ===
The artist of Beasties Coloring Book (1970), Vernon Koski, was posthumously selected to have his ashes incorporated into a painting, which is in the collection of the San Francisco Museum of Modern Art. Winston Tong did the artwork for The Dinosaur Coloring Book (1969). Other artists include Ruth Heller, Maze Craze, Color & Puzzle; Greg Irons, Advanced Dungeons and Dragons; William Gilkerson, The Scrimshander; Elizabeth Miles, Mother Goose Coloring Album; Morrie Turner, Black & White Coloring Book; Phil Frank, San Francisco Scenes, Travels with Farley; and Andrea Tachiera, Tropical Fish Coloring Album, Color of Nature Series.

== Cartoon Art Museum ==
Whyte, with the assistance of some fellow comics enthusiasts, founded the Cartoon Art Museum in 1984. He wrote and produced exhibition catalogs that featured the art of Walt Kelly, Charles Schulz, Edward Gorey, and Charles Crumb, Robert Crumb, and Maxon Crumb. Additionally, he wrote and produced two catalogs for touring exhibitions: "Draw Me A Story", "A Century of Children’s Book Illustration" and "Walk In Beauty, Discovering American Indian Art".

Whyte retired from the museum's board of directors in 1995. In 2008, the museum presented Whyte with a "Sparky" award, named after Charles M. Schulz, who was also given a caricature of himself by artist Zach Trenholm.

== Word Play Publications ==
In 1994 Whyte founded Word Play Publications to publish limited, signed illustrated books, among them Goreyography, the bibliography of the works of Edward Gorey, photo-documentary of underground cartoonists The Underground Comix Family Album, and Maxon’s Poe illustrated by Maxon Crumb.

== Selected list of works ==
- The Original Old Radio Game, Ed Callahan, Bill Shilling, co-authors. Pisani Press (1965)
- Great Comic Game Book, John Stanley, co-author. Price/Stern/Sloan (1966)
- Fat Cat Coloring & Limerick Book, Donna Sloan, art. Troubador Press (1967)
- Love Bug Coloring & Limerick Book, Donna Sloan, art. Troubador Press (1968)
- Mona Lisa Coloring Book. Troubador Press (1970)
- Dinosaur Coloring Book, Winston Tong, art. Troubador Press (1970)
- Beasties Coloring Book. Troubador Press (1970)
- North American Wildlife Coloring Album, Gompers Saijo, art. Troubador Press (1972)
- North American Birdlife Coloring Album, Gompers Saijo, art. Troubador Press (1972)
- North American Sealife Coloring Album, Gompers Saijo, art. Troubador Press (1973)
- The Meaning of Christmas, Varian Mace, art. Troubador Press (1973)
- Monster Movie Game, John Stanley, co-author. Troubador Press (1974)
- Gorey Games. Troubador Press (1979)
- Great Comic Cats, Bill Blackbeard, co-author. Troubador Press (1981)
- Huggs & Cuddles, Teddy Bear Paper Dolls, Terra Musick, art. Troubador Press, Price/Stern/Sloan (1984)
- Huggs & Cuddles, Teddy Bear Fun Book, Terra Musick, art. Troubador Press, Price/Stern/Sloan (1985)
- Travels With The Happy Bears Paper Dolls, Terra Musick, art. Troubador Press, Price/Stern/Sloan (1985)
- Dinosaur Action Set, Dan Smith, art & design. Troubador Press, Price/Stern/Sloan (1986)
- Dinosaur Action Set 2, Dan Smith, art & design. Troubador Press, Price/Stern/Sloan (1987)
- Great Whales Coloring Album, Dan Smith, art & design. Troubador Press, Price/Stern/Sloan (1987)
- Undersea Dinosaur Action Set, Dan Smith, art & design. Troubador Press, Price/Stern/Sloan (1988)
- Prehistoric Mammals Action Set, Dan Smith, art & design. Troubador Press, Price/Stern/Sloan (1988)
- Drawn to Excellence catalog. Cartoon Art Museum (1988)
- African Safari Action Set, Dan Smith, art & design. Troubador Press, Price/Stern/Sloan (1989)
- Butterflies - Colors of Nature Series, Andrea Tachiera, art. Troubador Press, Price/Stern/Sloan (1989)
- Farm Animals - Colors of Nature Series, Andrea Tachiera, art. Troubador Press, Price/Stern/Sloan (1989)
- Zoo Animals - Colors of Nature Series, Andrea Tachiera, art. Troubador Press, Price/Stern/Sloan (1989)
- The Art of Fantasia catalog. Cartoon Art Museum (1990)
- Zap to Zippy, Impact of the Underground catalog. Cartoon Art Museum (1990)
- Zoo Animals Action Set, Dan Smith, art & design. Troubador Press, Price/Stern/Sloan (1990)
- Zoo Animals Action Set 2, Dan Smith, art & design. Troubador Press, Price/Stern/Sloan (1990)
- Dolphins & Whales Model Set, Dan Smith, art & design. Troubador Press, Price/Stern/Sloan (1992)
- Great Plains Indian Action Set, Dan Smith, art & design. Troubador Press, Price/Stern/Sloan (1992)
- Pogo's Golden Anniversary Exhibition catalog. Cartoon Art Museum (1992)
- Artist of Mystery, Works of Edward Gorey catalog. Cartoon Art Museum (1993)
- Wilson's Andersen, S. Clay Wilson, art. Word Play Publications (1994)
- Tropical Fish Coloring Album, Andrea Tachiera, art. Putnam, Price/Stern/Sloan (1995)
- Exotic Animals Coloring Album, Alice Carter, art. Putnam, Price/Stern/Sloan (1995)
- Wild, Wild West Puzzles & Games, Larry Evans, art. Putnam, Price/Stern/Sloan (1995)
- Oceans of Invisibles, Larry Evans, art. Putnam, Price/Stern/Sloan (1995)
- Gorey World catalog. Cartoon Art Museum (1996)
- Goreyography. Word Play Publications (1996)
- The Underground Comix Family Album, photographs by Clay Geerdes, foreword by Will Eisner. Word Play Publications (1998)
- Out of Chaos, Art of the Brothers Crumb catalog. Cartoon Art Museum (1998)
- Great Comic Cats (revised), foreword by Patrick McDonnell. Pomegranate Books (2001)
- Draw Me a Story catalog. Cartoon Art Museum (2006)
- Literary Forms, Eclectic Formats: The Book Art of Edward Gorey article. Book Club of California: QNL LXXIII #4 (2007)
- Walk in Beauty catalog. Johnson Museum of Art (Cornell University) (2007)
- Making Howl Whole article. Book Club of California: QNL LXXIII #4 (2008)
- Panda: Her Story. Word Play Publications (2009)
- Maxon: Art Out of Chaos.
- The Making of Stereo Views article. Book Club of Calif: QNL LXXVII #1 (2012)
- Cottage Classics: Their Makers & The Making. Word Play Publications (2014)
- Maxon: Art Out of Chaos - Foreword by Robert Crumb. FU Press (2018)
- The Peasant and the Copper: The Ephemera Journal, Vol 22, No. 3; May (2020)
- A Search for the Last Rock Poster: The Ephemera Journal, Vol.23, No.2; January( 2021)
- Gorey Secrets:Artistic and Literary Influences behind Divers Books by Edward Gorey - Foreword by Peter F. Neumeyer. University Press of Mississippi (2022)
- Gorey Tales articles. edwardgorey.org/goreyvoices (2024...)
