= Live in St. Petersburg =

Live album by Tuxedomoon
- Released: 2002
- Recorded: November 27, 2000 at State Music Theatr, Saint Petersburg, Russia
- Genre: Post-punk, experimental rock
- Length: 84:36
- Label: Neo Acustica

Tuxedomoon chronology
Joeboy in Mexico (1997)	Live in St. Petersburg (2002)	Cabin in the Sky (2004)

Professional ratings
Review scores
Source	Rating
Allmusic	2.5/5 stars

Live in St. Petersburg is a live album by American post-punk band Tuxedomoon, released in 2002 by Neo Acustica.

== Track listing ==
All tracks are written by Steven Brown, Peter Dachert and Blaine L. Reininger.

Disc one
No.	Title	Length
1.	"KM/Seeding The Clouds"	10:55
2.	"Desire"	6:33
3.	"Fifth Column"	3:18
4.	"Tritone"	3:58
5.	"James Whale"	3:49
6.	"Again"	7:50
7.	"Nite and Day"	8:33
8.	"Volo vivace"	3:58
9.	"Loneliness"	5:36

Disc two
No.	Title	Length
1.	"Nazca"	4:53
2.	"59 to 1"	5:39
3.	"Nazca 2"	4:19
4.	"The Cage"	3:45
5.	"Litebulb Overkill"	3:07
6.	"Waterfront Seat"	6:53
7.	"What Use?"	5:25

== Personnel ==
Adapted from the Live in St. Petersburg liner notes.

Tuxedomoon

- Steven Brown – saxophone, keyboards, piano, vocals
- Peter Dachert (as Peter Principle) – bass guitar, guitar, loops, tape, drum programming
- Blaine L. Reininger – violin, guitar, keyboards, vocals

Production and additional personnel

- Igor Bystrov – mixing
- Alexander Dokshin – engineering
- Anton Chernyavsky – photography
- Oleg Kotelnikov – photography
- Oleg Kuptsov – executive producer, assistant mixing, cover art
- Gleb Palamodov – assistant mixing
- Michael Rappoport – recording
- Tuxedomoon – arrangement

== Release history ==
Region	Date	Label	Format	Catalog
Russia	2002	Neo Acustica	CD	NEO 01
