= Divine (Tuxedomoon album) =

Studio album by Tuxedomoon
- Released: May 1982
- Recorded: 1981
- Genre: Experimental rock
- Label: Operation Twilight
- Producer: Tuxedomoon

Tuxedomoon chronology
Desire (1981)	Divine (1982)	Time to Lose (1982)

Divine is the third studio album by American post-punk band Tuxedomoon, released in 1982 by Operation Twilight. The music is based on the ballet of the same name by Maurice Béjart. The album was issued on CD in 1990 by Cramboy with an expanded track listing.

== Track listing ==
All tracks are written by Maurice Béjart.

Side one
No.	Title	Length
1.	"Mata Hari"	4:42
2.	"Anna Christie"	3:05
3.	"Grand Hotel"	3:46
4.	"Ninotchka"	4:41

Side two
No.	Title	Length
1.	"Conquest"	3:54
2.	"Queen Christina"	7:16
3.	"Camille"	5:42

CD track listing
No.	Title	Length
1.	"Entracte"	1:21
2.	"Mata Hari"	4:42
3.	"Anna Christie"	3:05
4.	"Grand Hotel"	3:46
5.	"Entracte II"	1:34
6.	"Ninotchka"	4:41
7.	"Conquest"	3:54
8.	"Queen Christina"	7:16
9.	"Camille"	5:42
10.	"Freudlose Gasse"	4:00

== Personnel ==
Adapted from the Divine liner notes.

Tuxedomoon

- Steven Brown – saxophone, clarinet, keyboards, lead vocals
- Peter Dachert (as Peter Principle) – bass guitar, guitar, keyboards, drum programming, tape, lead vocals
- Blaine L. Reininger – violin, viola, keyboards, lead vocals

Additional musicians

- Bruce Geduldig – drums and lead vocals (B1)
- Winston Tong – piano and lead vocals (A1)

Production and additional personnel

- Saskia Lupini – cover art
- Gilles Martin – recording
- Tuxedomoon – production

== Release history ==
Region	Date	Label	Format	Catalog
United Kingdom	1982	Operation Twilight	LP	OPT 001
United Kingdom	1982	Les Disques du Crépuscule	LP	TWI 056
Belgium	1990	Cramboy	CD, LP	Cboy 1111
