= Time to Lose =

EP by Tuxedomoon
- Released: July 1982
- Recorded: March 1982
- Studio: The Garden Studios (London, UK)
- Genre: Post-punk, experimental rock
- Length: 16:14
- Label: Les Disques du Crépuscule
- Producer: Gareth Jones, Tuxedomoon

Tuxedomoon chronology
Divine (1982)	Time to Lose (1982)	Suite en sous-sol (1982)

Time to Lose is an EP by American post-punk band Tuxedomoon, released in July 1982 by Les Disques du Crépuscule. In 1986 it was compiled with Suite en sous-sol on CD.

== Track listing ==
All tracks are written by Steven Brown, Peter Dachert, Blaine L. Reininger and Winston Tong.

Side one
No.	Title	Length
1.	"Time to Lose"	5:11
2.	"Music No. 2"	3:32

Side two
No.	Title	Length
1.	"Blind"	7:31

== Personnel ==
Adapted from the Time to Lose liner notes.

Tuxedomoon

- Steven Brown – lead vocals (A1, B), Hammond organ (A1), piano (A2), Moog synthesizer (B), soprano saxophone (B), design
- Peter Dachert (as Peter Principle) – guitar (A1, B), bass guitar (A1), piano (A1), effects (B)
- Blaine L. Reininger – violin (A1, A2), Casio M-10 (B)
- Winston Tong – lead vocals (A1, B)

Production and additional personnel

- Gareth Jones – production, engineering, recording
- Jean-François Octave – cover art
- Tuxedomoon – production, recording

== Release history ==
Region	Date	Label	Format	Catalog
United Kingdom	1982	Les Disques du Crépuscule	LP	TWI 084
