= Short Story (disambiguation) =

A short story is a piece of prose fiction.

Short Story may also refer to:

- "Short Story" (Casualty), an episode of the television series Casualty
- "Short Story" (Even Stevens), an episode of the television series Even Stevens
- Short Story (Gershwin), a 1925 composition by George Gershwin
- Short Story (horse), a racehorse

== See also ==
- Short Stories (disambiguation)
