= Lou Grant (cartoonist) =

American cartoonist

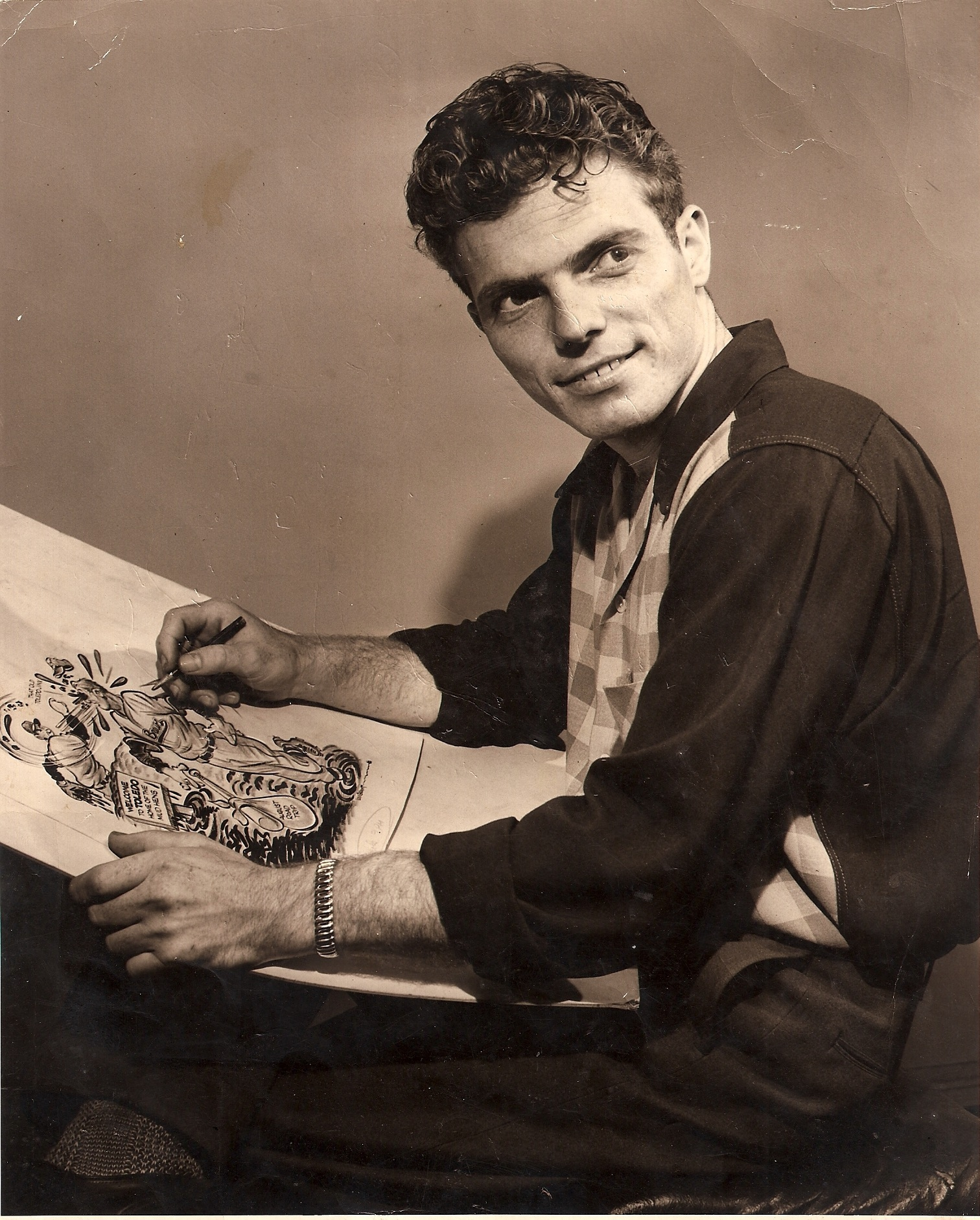
- Lou Grant at the drawing table when he was the sports cartoonist for the Milwaukee Sentinel in 1944.
- Born: December 3, 1919 South Los Angeles, California, U.S.
- Died: September 7, 2001 (aged 81)
- Area: Cartoonist
- Pseudonym: Dr. Gloom
- Notable works: Swine Skin Gulch; Oakland Tribune editorial cartoonist
- Awards: Sparky Award, 2001
- Spouses: Doris Weisel; Florenzi Pooley (m. 1973–his death)
- Children: Bill Grant and Josie Grant Grandchildren: Abra Brayman and Ben Grant

Lou Grant (December 3, 1919 – September 7, 2001) was an American editorial cartoonist. He mainly worked for the Oakland Tribune for 40 years and was the syndicated political cartoonist for the Los Angeles Times. His work was syndicated with the Los Angeles Times, and was seen daily throughout the country, as well periodically worldwide in Newsweek, (1960-1986) and Time Magazine (1960-1986). His life's work covered comedy and political satire, sports, radio, and political cartoons.

== Biography ==
Lou Grant started his career in the newspaper business as a copy boy for the Los Angeles Examiner in 1937. He illustrated his high school yearbook at Fremont High School in Los Angeles, and worked as a cartoonist during the war years for the Camp Roberts newspaper. His first art lesson came from winning a contest on a matchbook cover called "Learn How to Draw." He then received free lessons, but he was a natural talent.

During World War II, Grant was stationed at Fort MacArthur, San Pedro, California, where he worked for the camp newspaper, after having been diverted from the infantry unit which was sent to Anzio Beach in Italy and ended up experiencing heavy casualties. At that time he met his future writing partner in comedy, Bob Schiller, who would create All in the Family and be a comedy writer in television for I Love Lucy. They worked together as comedy writers for the radio show Duffy's Tavern.

After the war, Grant went to Carmel-by-the-Sea, California, to work with cartoonist Jimmy Hatlo, the comic strip artist for King Features Syndicate, inking the panels for They'll Do It Every Time.

After his marriage to Doris Weisel, the couple moved to Milwaukee, Wisconsin, where Grant worked as a sports cartoonist in 1944 for the Milwaukee Sentinel. His sports cartoons were known as Swine Skin Gulch (referencing the site for the baseball stadium Borchert Field in Milwaukee).

In 1949, William Randolph Hearst recruited Grant to be the sports cartoonist for the News Cal-Bulletin in San Francisco and his cartoons appeared daily in the sports section, 1949-1953.

Grant's political career took him to the Oakland Tribune. His editorial cartoons appeared daily from 1954-1987, and he remained as then paper's editorial cartoonist until his retirement in 1986. He never took a day off due to the nature of being current with the politics of the day. The Los Angeles Times Syndicate distributed Lou Grant cartoons to newspapers and news magazines nationally on a daily basis.

Grant was memorialized by Ed Asner in the television show Lou Grant, for MTM productions.

== Personal life and death ==
His family includes son Bill Grant, wrestling hall of fame coach, and daughter Josie Grant, artist and muralist (and archivist of the Lou Grant Archives). He lived with his family in Palo Alto and San Francisco. He later resided in Oakland, California.

He remarried Florenzi Pooley in 1973. She is the executor of his estate.

Lou Grant's obituary appeared in many newspapers nationally and locally in the San Francisco Bay Area.

== Awards ==
Grant received many awards, including from the National Safety Council for "Drinking & Driving Awareness"; from the National Press Club, the National Headliners Organization's award for Outstanding Editorial; The National Conference of Christians & Jews Brotherhood's award for Promoting World Peace, and posthumously the Sparky Award 2001 from the Charles M. Schulz Foundation and The Cartoon Art Museum of San Francisco.

Grant was honored with a one-man show at the Oakland Museum of California called The Pointed Pen in 1983.

== Archives ==
His work is archived in the collection The Best of Lou Grant of 1954-1955 cartoons and in the book Artists in California 1786 - 1940 by Edan Hughes.

The cartoons of Lou Grant are archived at The Bancroft Library, University of California, Berkeley, The Harry S. Truman Library and Museum, Independence Mo, In the Collection, Cartoons of President Harry Truman, The John F. Kennedy Presidential Library and Museum, Boston, MA, The Lyndon Baines Johnson Library and Museum, The Jimmy Carter Library and Museum, Atlanta, Georgia, The Cartoon Art Museum of San Francisco and the Library of Congress, Washington D.C.
