= Cult with No Name =

German/ English musical duo

Cult With No Name (often abbreviated to CWNN) is a German/English musical duo from London, comprising Erik Stein and Jon Boux. Influenced largely by electronic music, post-punk, and modern classical music, they refer to themselves "electronic balladeers". Formed in 2004, the band were initially signed by Los Angeles label Trakwerx in 2007, founded by Jackson Del Rey of Californian post-punk band Savage Republic and 17 Pygmies. Now on their own "CWNN Music" label, they are published through Blow Up Songs, founded by Paul Tunkin of the britpop club night Blow Up.

== Career ==
=== 2004–2013 ===
Erik Stein and Jon Boux's shared musical influences include OMD, Nits, the Blue Nile, Pink Floyd, and early Genesis. Stein has also cited the Stranglers, the Residents, Gary Numan, Tuxedomoon, the Associates, John Foxx, Devo, Yello, Art of Noise and Captain Beefheart. The classically trained Boux has drawn inspiration from composers such as Ralph Vaughan Williams, Edward Elgar, Aaron Copland, Arvo Pärt and Brian Eno.

Having contributed three instrumental tracks to 17 Pygmies' comeback album 13 Blackbirds, Cult With No Name made their full debut with the album Paper Wraps Rock in 2007. The album was met with broadly positive reviews, although the band regard it as their weakest, with the renowned music journalist Mick Mercer in particular championing the band, and making them his 'discovery of 2007'. The band's second album, Careful What You Wish For, was released a year later and included the instrumental track "You Know Me Better Than I Know Myself", which featured Tuxedomoon's Blaine L. Reininger on violin, and a piano-based cover of The Stranglers' classic "Golden Brown". The album was met with positive reviews, with supporters that include the filmmaker Don Letts. Former Suede frontman, Brett Anderson, also invited Cult With No Name to open for him at the launch of his solo album Slow Attack.

The band's next project was to record a new score for the classic German expressionist silent film, The Cabinet of Dr. Caligari, which was released simultaneously as a DVD and digital download in 2009 and coincided with the 90th anniversary of the making of the film. The score was notable for the inclusion of songs alongside instrumental soundscapes. In late 2010, Cult With No Name released their fourth studio album, entitled Adrenalin, which expanded the band's sound to include elements of trip-hop and psychedelia. The album includes the disco-pastiche, "The All Dead Burlesque Show" and underground electronic hit "Breathing". The website dsoaudio.com hailed the album as a "serious contender for album of the year".

Above as Below, Cult With No Name's fifth album, was released in January 2012. For the first time, it saw the band collaborate with a number of outside artists. Kelli Ali (ex-Sneaker Pimps) contributed extensively, including co-writing the song "Shake Hands with the Devil". Other contributors included Bruce Geduldig and Luc van Lieshout of Tuxedomoon, ex-Stranglers and Peter Gabriel guitarist John Ellis and Meg Maryatt of 17 Pygmies. The cover art and packaging for the album was designed by David Bowie and Damien Hirst collaborator Jonathan Barnbrook and manufactured using a letterpress. Mark Moore of S'Express described the album as possessing "such warmth, such style, such bliss". The band broke away from Trakwerx records following the release on the album. 2012 also saw CWNN contribute the opening track to a remix album from the German band S.Y.P.H., which features ex-Captain Beefheart guitarist Gary Lucas and Rambo Amadeus, amongst others.

=== 2013–present ===
In early 2013, Kelli Ali released her fifth solo album Band of Angels, which saw the band co-write and perform on two songs including the track "Eternity". The band's sixth album, Another Landing, was released in April 2014 on the band's own CWNN Music label. The album again saw the band collaborate with Tuxedomoon members Blaine L. Reininger, Bruce Geduldig and Luc van Lieshout, Kelli Ali and John Ellis, as well as Japanese electronica artist Coppe', and features the track "Swept Away", which was subsequently remixed by Rusty Egan. 2014 also saw the band contribute a cover "Typist of Candy" by Nits for the album ISNT NITS.

2016 saw the band contribute to a cover of Tuxedomoon's 'Loneliness' to a Crammed Discs reissue of the band's classic 'Half-Mute' album, that also featured Foetus, Aksak Maboul, and Simon Fisher Turner. Working once more with Blaine L. Reininger, Luc Van Lieshout and Kelli Ali, they also covered S'Express's 'COMA' for their 'Enjoy This Trip' remix album, which also included tracks from Chris & Cosey, Tom Furse from The Horrors, Primal Scream, Billie Ray Martin and Reuben Wu from Ladytron.

'Heir of the Dog', the band's 8th album, was released in September 2017, featuring the usual guest appearances from Tuxedomoon and Kelli Ali. The album includes the song 'No News', which closes the film 'Blue Velvet Revisited' but was not included on the soundtrack. Roger Spy directed a memorable 'cut up' video for the song 'When I Was a Girl'. The album picked up very favourable reviews. The track 'All I Have Is Yours (Including You)' appeared in the closing scene of the film 'The Allnighter', directed by Aimee Graham (sister of Heather Graham). A cover of The Residents's 'Boo Who?' appeared on the 2018 collaborative fan project 'I Am A Resident' through Cherry Red Records, and the band also contributed a cover of 'I Hate Heaven' to a tribute to the late Hardy Fox, which also featured The Residents, Renaldo and the Loaf, and Fred Frith.

The band's 9th album 'Mediaburn' was released in October 2019 and was met with very positive reviews. More political than earlier albums, it includes a number of sardonic put-downs of contemporary society. The album is also notable for the track '(No Such Thing As) Silence' which was commissioned by the Olympus Corporation and composed using ambient sounds solely captured via an Olympus LS-P4 mobile audio recorder. Several reviews also paid special attention the album's packaging.

Kelli Ali released the album 'Ghostdriver' in 2020. The album was a soundtrack album to a forthcoming film of the same name and featured two pieces written by CWNN. Stein and Boux also performed on several other tracks on there album and Stein acts in the film.

In August 2021, the band released their 10th album, entitled 'Nights in North Sentinel'. It is the first of their album not to feature at least one 'piano and vocal' song, and is noticeably more electronic. The album was again met with extremely positive reviews. the video artist and musician Roger Spy again directed a promo video for the band, for the song 'You're All You Ever Needed'. A remix of Renaldo and the Loaf's 'Djinn House' appeared on their 'Hardly Gurning While The World is Turning' album, alongside remixes by the likes of Transglobal Underground, The Residents, Section 25 and Eric Drew Feldman. The band also remixed R. Stevie Moore for 'The Gatekeepers', an ensemble concept album written by Alex Wroten that featured many notable left field artists, as well as for two subsequent albums.

The band's 11th album 'X into I' was released in April 2023, featuring 11 tracks (the title being a reference to the Roman numeral XI). It was the first of their albums to not feature any outside musicians since their 2007 debut. The packaging for the album included a fresnel lens to enable listeners to decipher and decode the album's lyrics. The album was met with extremely positive reviews, with Electronic Sound Magazine describing the band as 'synthpop's best-kept secret'. 'Indifference and Dust' was released in 2025, with Blitzed Magazine praising the duo and stating, 'I'm struggling to think of any acts that can compete.' The band were invited to contribute a remix to 'Remix: Encounters', the comeback album of Propaganda (band), which also featured the likes of Moby and Tangerine Dream. They also provided remixes for Fiat Lux (band) and Keanan Duffty.

== Blue Velvet Revisited ==
In early 2015, CWNN were commissioned by German filmmaker Peter Braatz to produce the soundtrack for Blue Velvet Revisited, a feature-length documentary film based around previously unreleased footage that Braatz had shot on the set of the David Lynch's classic film Blue Velvet, at the invitation of Lynch. The band invited Tuxedomoon to collaborate on the project, with John Foxx also contributing music. The resulting soundtrack was released in October 2015 and received significant international press and extremely positive reviews. The film premiered in October 2016 at the London Film Festival, with David Lynch selecting the film to be screened at his own Festival of Disruption in Los Angeles on the same weekend as the premiere. Since then, the film has been screened at a large number of festivals and cinemas worldwide. In May 2019, The Criterion Collection re-released Blue Velvet on DVD and Blu-Ray with Blue Velvet Revisited included as a main extra at Lynch's request.

In 2020, the track "Lumberton" from the soundtrack of Blue Velvet Revisited, was licensed to be used in the HBO series The New Pope, starring Jude Law and John Malkovich. American rapper Pouya sampled the track 'Until the Robins Come' for his 2024 album 'They Could Never Make You Hate You'.

== Other work ==
In addition to their studio albums, the band have contributed music to two comedic stage productions at the Edinburgh Fringe Festival, Moz and the Meal and Bored Stiff, and provide all the music for the popular true crime 'Murder Mile' podcast from the same writer, Michael Buchanan-Dunne. The band have frequently collaborated with minimal techno artist Doudou Malicious for his Multi-Vitamins label. Erik Stein has also acted in several short films made by electronic music pioneer John Foxx as well as the 2011 short film Sonus produced by Ridley Scott Associates and Gustav (2012), which was on display at Bletchley Park. Stills of Stein appear in the artwork for Foxx's 'London Overgrown' and 'The Marvellous Notebook' albums.

In 2016, Erik Stein contributed lead vocals on two tracks for Blitz nightclub founder and DJ Rusty Egan's solo album 'Welcome to the Dancefloor', which additionally features Peter Hook (New Order), Midge Ure (Ultravox!) and Tony Hadley (Spandau Ballet). He also sings lead vocals on a subsequent Rusty Egan single 'I Thought I Could Never Love Again' with guests Chris Payne (musician) (ex-Gary Numan) and saxophonist Gary Barnacle. The song featured on Egan's 2025 album 'Romantic', with 2 other tracks that feature CWNN alongside Wolfgang Fluer and Zaine Griff ('Visions of You'), and Andy Mackay of Roxy Music ('Best Friend').

In 2020, Stein released the digital EP 'Textbooks for Tomorrow', a collaboration with Belgian musician and producer Jean-Marc Lederman (The Weathermen (band), The The, Fad Gadget) and released under the name 'Lederman * Stein'.

As a journalist, Stein was the former music editor for Wound Magazine and Glass Magazine. He has written liner notes for a number of album releases, including Oui 3, and the score for the Netflix Requiem (TV series) composed by Dominik Scherrer and Natasha Khan aka Bat for Lashes. He co-wrote a chapter on Duesseldorf with Rudi Esch for the book Electronic Cities - Music, Policies and Space in the 21st Century, published by Palgrave Macmillan.

CWNN's music has been described as difficult to categorise. However, they been compared to Roxy Music, Tuxedomoon, the Pet Shop Boys, Colin Newman, Nits, David Sylvian, and Scott Walker, amongst others. As well as performing in the UK, the band has performed in the US and Europe. The band were nominated for the UK's Exposure Music Awards in 2011.

== Discography ==
- Paper Wraps Rock (2007)
- Careful What You Wish For (2008)
- Lightwerx: The Cabinet of Dr Caligari (2009)
- Adrenalin (2010)
- Above as Below (2012)
- Another Landing (2014)
- Blue Velvet Revisited (2015) (collaboration with Tuxedomoon and John Foxx)
- Heir of the Dog (2017)
- Mediaburn (2019)
- Nights in North Sentinel (2021)
- X into I (2023)
- Indifference and Dust (2025)
