= Frank Pahl =

American composer (b. 1958)

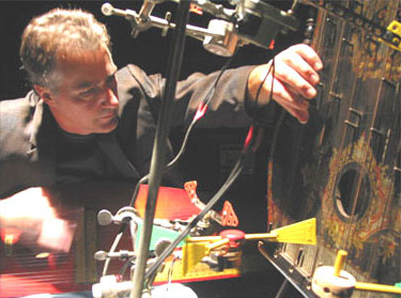
Composer Frank Pahl onstage with zithers

Frank Pahl is a Michigan-based musician/composer, working in several styles including "toy pop", or music made with toys. He works primarily in Wyandotte and Ann Arbor, Michigan, and has exhibited his work in Canada, Europe and Japan, as well as the United States.

== Musical life ==
Pahl has worked in several groups, including Only a Mother, Sublime Wedge, Immigrant Suns and currently in Scavenger Quartet, a freeform musical group, and Little Bang Theory, a "toy" music trio. Frank has worked with other avant-garde musicians like Eugene Chadbourne and Fred Frith. He frequently collaborates with Professors Terri Saris and Peter Sparling Frank has built and exhibited a lot of "automatic instruments"

== Qualifications and awards ==
Pahl was awarded the Master of Fine Arts degree in Art and Design from the University of Michigan Pahl was awarded the Kresge Art Fellowship in 2010.

== Personal life ==
Pahl was born February 11, 1958, in Trenton, MI, and played euphonium in high school. Pahl grew up in Wyandotte and became interested in music while listening to FM radio in the 1970s.

== Discography ==
=== Solo ===
- The Cowboy Disciple - Pahl's first solo releases - original release 1991, Bandcamp release 2021
- The Romantic Side of Schizophrenia- original release 1994 - Bandcamp release 2021
- Remove The Cork 1998 (Demosaurus Records)
- Back from Beyond 2003
- Song of War and Peace 2007

=== Scores ===
- Loose Threads - Dance score commissioned by Terri Sarris as composer and dancer - 1995

=== Collaborations ===
- Thunderclap - Live at the Den Haag Korzo Theatre Field Recordings 3 - Luc Houtkamp & Guests Frank Pahl - Engineer, Banjo - 1996
- Boss Witch - Shaking Ray Levis (Shaking Ray Records) My favorite improvising duo on this here planet, Dennis Palmer and Bob Stagner get together with some of their favorites (JD Parran, Davey Williams, Frank Pahl, Mary Richards & Steve Beresford). - 1997
- In Cahoots - Pahl collaborates on separate tracks with: The Immigrant Suns, Eugene Chadbourne, Only a Mother, Shaking Ray Levis, Luc Houtkamp, David Greenberger, Missy Gibson, Brian Poole and more. - 1997
- In Cahoots- 2021
- In Cahoots vol. 2- 2021
- In Cahoots vol. 3- 2021
- In Cahoots vol. 4- 2021
- In Cahoots vol. 5- 2022
- In Cahoots vol. 6- 2022
- In Cahoots vol. 7- 2023
- In Cahoots vol. 8- 2024
- In Cahoots vol. 9- 2024
- Music for Desserts - Frank Pahl and Klimperei (in poly sons - France) - 2001
- Mayor Of The Tennessee River - David Greenberger & Shaking Ray Levis (PelPel Recordings) - 2003

=== As a band member ===
- Riding White Alligators - Only a Mother The first release by Only a Mother. -1987
- The Romantic Warped - Only a Mother - 1989
- Studio Animals - Only a Mother - 1990
- Naked Songs For Contortionists - Only A Mother - 1991
- Feral Chickens - Only A Mother - 1995
- More Than Food - Immigrant Suns (Phonetic Records) Frank Pahl - Farfisa Organ, Siren, Euphonium, Engineer - 1998
- Damned Pretty Snout - Only A Mother - 1998
- Field Recordings - Immigrant Suns (Phonetic Records) Frank Pahl - Engineer, Alto Clarinet - 2001
- Whistling for Leftovers- Scavenger Quartet - (Snowdonia - Italy) Scavenger Quartet (Doug Gourlay of Only a Mother, Tim Holmes of Major Dents, and Joel Peterson of Immigrant Suns and XHG) was originally formed to perform original jazz waltzes for the choreography of Peter Sparling. We got along so well we decided to call it a group. Dave Mandl of The Wire wrote "a chamber jazz hybrid that is much more intimate than Only a Mother but with an equally vast palette." And Ralph Valdez of WDET added "Future-rustic might be an apt description of the Scavenger sound which achieves a fusion that is simultaneously antiquated and avant garde." - 2001
- Supernova - Immigrant Suns 2002 (Phonetic Records) Frank Pahl - Harmonium, Euphonium
- We Who Live On Land- Scavenger Quartet- 2004 (Acidsoxx Musiks)
- Hats - Scavenger Quartet - 2012 (Acidsoxx Musiks)

=== Compilations ===
- Studio Animals - Various In the '80s I began releasing cassette-only compilations. This vinyl release was my foray into the big time. Contributors include Eugene Chadbourne, Only a Mother, Rascal Reporters, Major Dents and more. - 1989
- Passed Normal Vol.5 - Various Artists - Frank & Major Dents contribute one track to this ever-eclectic collection series assembled by FOT Records. It started out as a cassette only collection, mutated to vinyl, and now on CD. - 1992
- Lyrics By Ernest Noyes Brookings - Various Artists - 1992
- LSD C&W, Pt.2 - Eugene Chadbourne w/Frank Pahl & Only A Mother - 1992
- The Nerve Events - Various Artists w/Dr Nerve - 1993
- Lyrics By Ernest Noyes Brookings II - Various Artists - 1995
- Unsettled Scores - Various Artists - 1995
- I Still Feel Like Myself - David Greenberger with special guests (PONK Home Recordings) How's this for a lineup: Only a Mother, Eugene Chadbourne, Davey Williams, Billy Tipton Memorial Saxophone Quartet (minus Amy), Tatsu Aoki and David and I. All previously unreleased material. - 1995
- Eyesore: A Stab At The Residents - Various Artists - Tribute to the Residents - 1996
- State Of The Union - Various Artists (Atavistic) - Compilation curated by Elliott Sharp - 1996
- Haikus Urbains - Various Artists - 1997
- Atomic Milk-Throwers (with Scavenger Quartet) - Various Artists -2000
- Misique Du Jouet - Various Artists (Novel Cell Poem - Japan) Including Frank Pahl, Klimperei, Pascal Comelade, David Fenech, Itoken, Harpy & more. Japanese toypop label Novel Cell Poem releases a bunch of previously unreleased tracks in a beautiful package with informative book insert (if you read Japanese). - 2003
