= Vapour Trails =

Studio album by Tuxedomoon
- Released: November 26, 2007
- Recorded: Sweetohm Studio (Athens, GR)
- Genres: Art rock, experimental rock
- Length: 51:57
- Label: Cramboy
- Producer: Tuxedomoon

Tuxedomoon chronology
Bardo Hotel Soundtrack (2006)	Vapour Trails (2007)

Professional ratings
Review scores
Source	Rating
Allmusic	3.5/5 stars
PopMatters	(6/10)
Q	3/5 stars
Uncut	3/5 stars

Vapour Trails is the ninth studio album and overall eleventh album by the experimental rock band Tuxedomoon. It was released in 2007 through Cramboy.

== Track listing ==
All tracks are written by Steven Brown, Peter Dachert, Luc Van Lieshout and Blaine L. Reininger.

No.	Title	Length
1.	"Muchos Colores"	5:26
2.	"Still Small Voice"	5:26
3.	"Kubrick"	7:14
4.	"Big Olive"	6:25
5.	"Dark Temple"	7:07
6.	"Dizzy"	6:42
7.	"Epso Meth Lama"	9:10
8.	"Wading into Love"	4:27

== Personnel ==
Adapted from the Vapour Trails liner notes.

Tuxedomoon

- Steven Brown – saxophone, clarinet, keyboards, piano, organ, vocals
- Peter Dachert (as Peter Principle) – bass guitar, electric guitar, backing vocals, mixing
- Luc Van Lieshout – trumpet, flugelhorn, harmonica
- Blaine L. Reininger – violin, viola, guitar, keyboards, vocals

Additional musicians

- Nikos Papavranousis – drums (2, 4, 7)

Production and additional personnel

- Jonathan Barnbrook – design
- Coti – mixing
- Vincent Kenis – mastering
- Christos Lainas – engineering
- Lambros Syfris – engineering
- Tuxedomoon – production
- Alan Ward – mastering

== Release history ==
Region	Date	Label	Format	Catalog
Belgium	2007	Cramboy	CD	CBoy 1616
