= The Ghost Sonata (album) =

Studio album by Tuxedomoon
- Released: 1991
- Recorded: December 1990
- Genre: Chamber music, ambient
- Length: 43:05
- Label: LTM
- Producer: Tuxedomoon

Tuxedomoon chronology
Ten Years in One Night (Live) (1989)	The Ghost Sonata (1991)	Solve et Coagula (1991)

The Ghost Sonata is the seventh studio album by American post-punk band Tuxedomoon, released in 1991 by LTM Recordings.

== Track listing ==
No.	Title	Writer(s)	Length
1.	"The Funeral of a Friend"	Peter Dachert, Bruce Geduldig	1:09
2.	"The Ghost Sonata"	Blaine L. Reininger, Steven Brown	5:36
3.	"Catalyst"	Peter Dachert	0:42
4.	"An Affair at the Soiree"	Steven Brown, Peter Dachert, Bruce Geduldig, Blaine L. Reininger	3:39
5.	"Music Number Two"	Steven Brown, Blaine L. Reininger	2:56
6.	"A Drowning"	Steven Brown, Peter Dachert, Blaine L. Reininger	2:07
7.	"The Cascade"	Steven Brown, Blaine L. Reininger	3:02
8.	"A Mystic Death"	Peter Dachert, Bruce Geduldig	2:16
9.	"Basso Pomade (Dogs Lickin' My Heart)"	Steven Brown, Blaine L. Reininger	2:36
10.	"Licorice Stick Ostinato"	Steven Brown, Blaine L. Reininger	2:19
11.	"The Laboratory" (Parts 1 & 2)	Steven Brown, Peter Dachert, Blaine L. Reininger	5:08
12.	"Les Odalisques"	Steven Brown, Peter Dachert, Bruce Geduldig, Blaine L. Reininger	4:10
13.	"An Unsigned Postcard"	Steven Brown, Peter Dachert, Blaine L. Reininger	3:06
14.	"Music Number Two" (Reprise)	Steven Brown, Blaine L. Reininger	4:19

== Personnel ==
Adapted from The Ghost Sonata liner notes.

Tuxedomoon

- Steven Brown
- Peter Dachert
- Blaine L. Reininger

Additional musicians

- Gregorio Bardini – flute
- Graziano Benvenutti – cello
- Sabrina Franca – violin
- Marcello Galli – clarinet
- Graziano Gerboni – clarinet
- Francesco Guidobaldi – double bass
- Antonella Lisi – cello
- Roberto Mori – oboe

Additional musicians (cont.)

- Christina Ottavi – violin
- Emanuela Piccini – violin
- Sandro Rossini – violin
- Marina Santoro – violin
- Sandra Steffanini – violin

Production and additional personnel

- Drem Bruinsma – engineering
- Bruno Donini – engineering
- Gilles Martin – engineering
- James Neiss – editing
- Jerome Sandron – engineering
- Tuxedomoon – production

== Release history ==
Region	Date	Label	Format	Catalog
United Kingdom	1991	LTM	CD, LP	LTM 2303
Belgium	1997	Cramboy	CD	CBoy 1414
