= Desire (Tuxedomoon album) =

Studio album by Tuxedomoon
- Released: 1981
- Recorded: November 1980
- Studio: Jacobs (Farnham, UK)
- Genre: Post-punk, experimental rock
- Length: 49:31
- Label: Ralph
- Producer: Gareth Jones, Tuxedomoon

Tuxedomoon chronology
Half-Mute (1980)	Desire (1981)	Divine (1982)

Desire is the second studio album by American post-punk band Tuxedomoon, released in 1981 by Ralph Records. The album was reissued on CD in 1987 by Cramboy, bundled together with No Tears.

== Critical reception ==
Professional ratings
Review scores
Source	Rating
AllMusic	3/5 stars
The Rolling Stone Album Guide	4/5 stars

The Quietus wrote that the album "represent[s] a sort of goth for the people who’ve actually did the reading before class, eschewing the Rocky Horror camp of their peers in favour of a knowing, icy glamour". A critic at Last Sigh magazine gave the album a positive review and said "this is an example of a band who explore the music they compose -- they play their own original style of music that can't be compared to any specific style of music."

== Track listing ==
All tracks are written by Steven Brown, Peter Dachert, Blaine L. Reininger and Winston Tong.

Side one
No.	Title	Length
1.	"East"	4:28
2.	"Jinx"	5:34
3.	"• • •"	1:05
4.	"Music #1"	3:47
5.	"Victims of the Dance"	5:48
6.	"Incubus (Blue Suit)"	3:50

Side two
No.	Title	Length
1.	"Desire"	7:06
2.	"Again"	6:20
3.	"In the Name of Talent (Italian Western Two)"	6:02
4.	"Holiday for Plywood (Holiday for Strings)"	5:38

1987 CD issue bonus tracks
No.	Title	Writer(s)	Length
8.	"New Machine" (from No Tears)	Brown; Dachert; Reininger	4:22
9.	"Litebulb Overkill" (from No Tears)	Brown; Dachert; Reininger	3:12
10.	"Nite & Day (Hommage à Cole Porter)" (from No Tears)	Brown; Dachert; Reininger	5:11
11.	"No Tears" (from No Tears)	Brown; Dachert; Reininger	5:40

== Music video ==
A music video directed by Graeme Whifler was produced for "Jinx". The video uses a shorter, 3-minute version of the song in a slightly slower tempo.

== Personnel ==
Adapted from the Desire liner notes.

=== Tuxedomoon ===
- Steven Brown – alto saxophone, soprano saxophone, keyboards, lead vocals
- Peter Dachert (as Peter Principle) – bass guitar, guitar, synthesizer, drum programming
- Blaine L. Reininger – violin, guitar, keyboards, arrangement, lead vocals
- Winston Tong – lead vocals, backing vocals

=== Additional musicians ===
- Vicky Aspinall – violin (track B4)
- Al Robinson – cello (tracks A1–A3, B4)

=== Production and design ===
- Gareth Jones – production, engineering
- Stefano Paolillo – photography
- Patrick Roques – cover art, design
- Tuxedomoon – production

== Release history ==
Region	Date	Label	Format	Catalog
United States	1981	Ralph	LP	TX8004
Australia	1981	Missing Link	LP	LINK 15
France	1981	Celluloid	LP	529809
Germany	1981	Charisma	LP	6302 102
Greece	1981	Virgin	LP	EX 01
Italy	1981	Expanded Music	LP	EX 01
Belgium	1985	Cramboy	LP	Cboy 3030
Belgium	1987	Cramboy	CD	CBoy 3070
