= Cabin in the Sky (Tuxedomoon album) =

Studio album by Tuxedomoon
- Released: July 20, 2004
- Recorded: 2004 in Cagli, Italy, and Brussels, Belgium
- Genres: Art rock, experimental rock
- Length: 58:26
- Label: Cramboy
- Producers: Coti, Tuxedomoon

Tuxedomoon chronology
Live in St. Petersburg (2002)	Cabin in the Sky (2004)	Bardo Hotel Soundtrack (2006)

Cabin in the Sky is the eighth studio album and overall tenth album by American post-punk band Tuxedomoon, released on July 20, 2004, by Cramboy.

== Track listing ==
All tracks are written by Steven Brown, Peter Dachert, Luc Van Lieshout and Blaine L. Reininger, except "Baron Brown" co-written with Winston Tong.

No.	Title	Length
1.	"A Home Away"	3:22
2.	"Baron Brown"	4:37
3.	"Annuncialto"	5:26
4.	"Diario di un egoista"	4:11
5.	"La più bella"	1:23
6.	"Cagli Five-O"	7:14
7.	"Here 'Til X-Mas"	5:01
8.	"Chinese Mike"	6:04
9.	"La più bella" (reprise)	2:31
10.	"The Island"	3:33
11.	"Misty Blue"	5:26
12.	"Luther Blisset"	4:43
13.	"Annuncialto Redux"	4:55

== Personnel ==
Adapted from the Cabin in the Sky liner notes.

Tuxedomoon

- Steven Brown – alto saxophone, soprano saxophone, clarinet, keyboards, piano, vocals
- Peter Dachert (as Peter Principle) – bass guitar, electric guitar, drum programming, percussion, backing vocals, recording, mixing
- Luc Van Lieshout – trumpet, flugelhorn, harmonica
- Blaine L. Reininger – violin, viola, guitar, synthesizer, drum programming, vocals

Additional musicians

- Marc Collin – programming (1, 2, 4, 7, 8, 11, 12)
- DJ Hell – programming (7, 12)
- Bruce Geduldig – backing vocals

Production and additional personnel

- Aksak Maboul – additional programming and mixing (8)
- Coti – production, recording, mixing
- Isabelle Corbisier – photography
- Hanna Gorjaczkowska – art direction
- Marc Hollander – assistant mixing
- Vincent Kenis – assistant mixing, mastering, engineering (8)
- John McEntire – mixing (12)
- Ian Simmonds – production and mixing (8)
- Tarwater – production and mixing (13)
- Tuxedomoon – production, arrangement
- Alan Ward – mastering

== Release history ==
Region	Date	Label	Format	Catalog
Belgium	2004	Cramboy	CD	CBoy 6060
