= Holy Wars (album) =

Studio album by Tuxedomoon
- Released: 1985
- Recorded: 1984 – 1985
- Studio: Daylight Studios (Brussels, BE)
- Genre: Post-punk, new wave
- Length: 50:16
- Label: Cramboy
- Producer: Gilles Martin, Tuxedomoon

Tuxedomoon chronology
Short Stories (1983)	Holy Wars (1985)	Ship of Fools (1986)

Professional ratings
Review scores
Source	Rating
Allmusic	3/5 stars

Holy Wars is the fourth studio album by American post-punk band Tuxedomoon, released in 1985 by Cramboy. "In a Manner of Speaking" is probably the band's most known song, after being covered by Martin Gore on his 1989 Counterfeit EP and by Nouvelle Vague on their 2004 eponymous debut album.

== Track listing ==
No.	Title	Writer(s)	Lead Vocals	Length
1.	"The Waltz"	Steven Brown, Peter Dachert, Luc Van Lieshout		5:12
2.	"St. John"	Steven Brown, Peter Dachert	Steven Brown	4:33
3.	"Bonjour tristesse"	Steven Brown, Peter Dachert, Luc Van Lieshout, Winston Tong	Winston Tong	5:28
4.	"Hugging the Earth"	Steven Brown, Peter Dachert	Steven Brown	4:02
5.	"In a Manner of Speaking"	Winston Tong	Steven Brown and Winston Tong	3:30
6.	"Some Guys"	Steven Brown, Peter Dachert, Luc Van Lieshout	Steven Brown	4:58
7.	"Holy Wars"	Steven Brown, Peter Dachert, Winston Tong	Winston Tong	6:44
8.	"Watching the Blood Flow"	Steven Brown, Blaine L. Reininger	Steven Brown	5:10
9.	"Egypt"	Steven Brown, Peter Dachert	Steven Brown	4:57
10.	"Soma"	Winston Tong		5:42

== Personnel ==
Adapted from the Holy Wars liner notes.

Tuxedomoon

- Steven Brown – lead vocals (2, 4–6, 8, 9), organ (1–4, 7–9), synthesizer (1, 3, 7–9), electric piano (1–3), alto saxophone (1, 7, 8), clarinet (4), keyboards (6), soprano saxophone (7), tape (7), piano (9), drum programming (9), clapping (9)
- Peter Dachert (as Peter Principle) – bass guitar (1–4, 6–8), tape (2), drum programming (2–4, 6–9), synthesizer (3, 7), guitar (5, 6, 8, 9), cymbal (6), clapping (9)
- Luc Van Lieshout – trumpet (1–3, 7–9), harmonica (1, 3, 7–9), organ (4), melodica (6), recorder (6), clapping (9)
- Winston Tong – lead vocals (3, 5, 7), backing vocals (2, 8, 9), percussion (9)

Additional musicians

- Jan D'Haese – spoken word (2)
- Bruce Geduldig – whistle (5)
- Alain Lefebvre – percussion (2, 8), Congas (3)

Production and additional personnel

- Bernard Faucon – cover art
- Martine Jawerbaum – executive producer
- Gilles Martin – production, engineering, recording
- Tuxedomoon – production, arrangement

== Release history ==
Region	Date	Label	Format	Catalog
Belgium	1985	Cramboy	CD, LP	CBoy 2020
United States	1985	Restless	LP	TX8004
Greece	1985	Virgin	LP	EX 01
France	1987	Celluloid	CD	CEL 5478
