= Joeboy in Mexico =

Studio album by Joeboy
- Released: 1997
- Genre: Post-punk
- Length: 62:19
- Label: Opción Sónica
- Producer: Tuxedomoon

Tuxedomoon chronology
Solve et Coagula (1991)	Joeboy in Mexico (1997)	Live in St. Petersburg (2002)

Joeboy in Mexico is the overall ninth album by American post-punk band Tuxedomoon using the Joeboy name, released in 1997 by Opción Sónica.

== Track listing ==
No.	Title	Length
1.	"The Door/Viaje en la Sierra Madre"	10:43
2.	"Brad's Loop"	6:03
3.	"Les six"	4:55
4.	"Shipwreck"	3:28
5.	"Untitled"	0:05
6.	"Zombie Paradise I"	11:02
7.	"Zombie Paradise II"	2:35
8.	"Bitter Bark"	5:29
9.	"El Popo"	5:02
10.	"Hindi Loop"	6:21
11.	"Untitled"	0:26
12.	"Ambient Popo"	5:06
13.	"Keredwin's Reel"	1:04

== Personnel ==
Adapted from the Joeboy in Mexico liner notes.

Tuxedomoon

- Steven Brown
- Peter Dachert
- Blaine L. Reininger

== Release history ==
Region	Date	Label	Format	Catalog
Mexico	1997	Opción Sónica	CD	OPCD 48
