= Scream with a View =

EP by Tuxedomoon
- Released: 1979
- Recorded: August 1979
- Genre: Post-punk, synthpunk
- Length: 17:35
- Label: Tuxedomoon
- Producer: Tuxedomoon

Tuxedomoon chronology
No Tears (1978)	Scream with a View (1979)	Half-Mute (1980)

Scream with a View is an EP by Tuxedomoon, independently released in 1979. It was re-released on ExpandedMusic (Italy) in 1983, and on Cramboy in 1985.

== Track listing ==
Side one
No.	Title	Music	Lyrics/Vocals	Length
1.	"Nervous Guy"	Blaine L. Reininger	Blaine L. Reininger	4:22
2.	"Where Interests Lie"	Peter Dachert	Steven Brown	3:12

Side two
No.	Title	Music	Lyrics/Vocals	Length
1.	"(Special Treatment for The) Family Man"	Steven Brown	Steven Brown	4:22
2.	"Midnite Stroll"	Michael Belfer	Michael Belfer	5:39

== Personnel ==
Adapted from the Scream with a View liner notes.

Tuxedomoon

- Michael Belfer – guitar (A1, A2), synthesizer (B1, B2), drum programming (B2), Moog Taurus (B2), lead vocals (B2), design
- Steven Brown – soprano saxophone (A1, B2), lead vocals (A2, B1), synthesizer (A1), Synare electronic drums (A2)
- Peter Dachert – bass guitar (A1, A2, B1), piano (B1), backing vocals (B1)
- Blaine L. Reininger – drum programming (A1, A2, B1), lead vocals (A1), violin (A1), synthesizer (A2), rototoms (B1), Synare electronic drums (B1), backing vocals (B1)

Production and additional personnel

- Mark Lee Baker – executive producer
- Richard Peterson – photography
- Patrick Roques – design
- Tuxedomoon – production, engineering, mixing

== Release history ==
Region	Date	Label	Format	Catalog
United States	1979	Tuxedomoon	LP	TX EP 79
Italy	1982	Expanded Music	LP	EX 27Y
Belgium	1985	Cramboy	LP	CBoy 4040
United States	2013	Superior Viaduct	LP	SV037
