= Bardo Hotel Soundtrack =

Soundtrack album by Tuxedomoon
- Released: June 27, 2006
- Recorded: 2005–2006
- Genre: Art rock
- Length: 63:12
- Label: Made to Measure

Tuxedomoon chronology
Cabin in the Sky (2004)	Bardo Hotel Soundtrack (2006)	Vapour Trails (2007)

Professional ratings
Review scores
Source	Rating
Allmusic	3.5/5 stars
PopMatters	(7/10)

Bardo Hotel Soundtrack is a soundtrack album by American post-punk band Tuxedomoon, released on June 27, 2006 by Made to Measure.

== Track listing ==
All music is composed by Steven Brown, Peter Dachert, Luc Van Lieshout and Blaine L. Reininger.

No.	Title	Length
1.	"Hurry Up and Wait (Flying Sequence)"	1:37
2.	"Effervescing in the Nether Sphere"	5:55
3.	"Soup du Jour"	3:57
4.	"Flying Again"	1:24
5.	"Triptych"	6:11
6.	"I'm Real Stupid"	1:03
7.	"Airport Blues"	1:04
8.	"Needles Prelude"	1:49
9.	"Prometheus Bound"	1:31
10.	"The Show Goes on: Baron Brown"	1:38
11.	"The Show Goes on: Jinx"	0:40
12.	"The Show Goes on: Loneliness"	0:59
13.	"Remote (Pralaya)"	4:15
14.	"Dream Flight"	1:06
15.	"More Flying"	2:16
16.	"Vulcanic, Combustible"	11:28
17.	"Mr. Comfort"	3:41
18.	"Another Flight"	1:37
19.	"Invocation of"	4:05
20.	"Carry on Circles"	5:56

== Personnel ==
Adapted from the Bardo Hotel Soundtrack liner notes.

Tuxedomoon

- Steven Brown – saxophone, clarinet, keyboards, tape, recording (7, 12)
- Peter Dachert (as Peter Principle) – bass guitar, guitar, editing, recording (1–6, 8–11, 13–20)
- Luc Van Lieshout – trumpet, flugelhorn, harmonica, recording (16, 19)
- Blaine L. Reininger – violin, guitar, editing

Additional musicians

- George Kakanakis – percussion (6, 17)

Production and additional personnel

- Coti – editing, recording (9)
- Evgeniou – photography
- Marc Hollander – editing
- Vincent Kenis – editing
- NoLogo – design

== Release history ==
Region	Date	Label	Format	Catalog
Belgium	2006	Made to Measure	CD	MTM 38
