= Ship of Fools (album) =

Studio album by Tuxedomoon
- Released: 1986
- Recorded: December 1985 – January 1986
- Studios: Daylight Studios (Brussels, BE)
- Genres: Post-punk, new wave
- Length: 28:03
- Label: Cramboy
- Producers: Gilles Martin, Tuxedomoon

Tuxedomoon chronology
| Holy Wars (1985) | Ship of Fools (1986) | You (1987) |

Ship of Fools is the fifth studio album by American post-punk band Tuxedomoon, released in 1986 by Cramboy.

== Track listing ==
| No. | Title | Writer(s) | Lead Vocals | Length |
|---|---|---|---|---|
| 1. | "Atlantis" | Steven Brown, Peter Dachert | Steven Brown | 5:03 |
| 2. | "Reeding, Righting, Rhythmatic" | Steven Brown, Peter Dachert, Luc Van Lieshout | Steven Brown | 4:53 |
| 3. | "Break the Rules" | Steven Brown, Peter Dachert, Luc Van Lieshout | Steven Brown and Bruce Geduldig | 4:09 |
| 4. | "A Piano Solo" | Steven Brown | | 2:54 |
| 5. | "Lowlands Tone Poem" | Steven Brown, Peter Dachert, Luc Van Lieshout | | 1:55 |
| 6. | "Music for Piano + Guitar" | Steven Brown, Peter Dachert | | 1:50 |
| 7. | "An Afternoon With N" | Steven Brown | | 2:29 |
| 8. | "The Train" | Steven Brown, Peter Dachert, Ivan Georgiev | Steven Brown | 4:50 |

== Personnel ==
Adapted from the Ship of Fools liner notes.

Tuxedomoon

- Steven Brown – lead vocals (1–3, 8), soprano saxophone (1–3), piano (5–7), keyboards (3), clarinet (8)
- Peter Dachert (as Peter Principle) – bass guitar (1, 3, 5, 6, 8), guitar (1, 2, 6), percussion (1–3), EBow (6)
- Ivan Georgiev – organ (1), synthesizer (1, 3), bass guitar (2), piano (8)
- Luc Van Lieshout – trumpet (1, 3, 7), flugelhorn (1, 5, 8), synthesizer (2, 8), organ (2), harmonica (3), percussion (6)

Additional musicians

- Marcia Barcellos – backing vocals (2)
- Bruce Geduldig – lead vocals (3)
- Thierry Szyfer – drums (8)

Production and additional personnel

- Jean-Marie Jacobs – photography
- Daniel Leon – recording (8)
- Gilles Martin – production, recording
- Tuxedomoon – production, arrangement

== Release history ==
| Region | Date | Label | Format | Catalog |
|---|---|---|---|---|
| Belgium | 1986 | Cramboy | CD, LP | CBoy 6060 |
| United States | 1986 | Restless | LP | 72149 |
| Greece | 1986 | Virgin | LP | VG 50188 |
