= Half-Mute =

Studio album by Tuxedomoon
- Released: March 15, 1980
- Recorded: December 1979
- Studio: Audios Amigos (San Francisco, California)
- Genre: Post-punk, experimental rock
- Length: 40:04
- Label: Ralph
- Producer: Tuxedomoon

Tuxedomoon chronology
| Scream with a View (1979) | Half-Mute (1980) | Desire (1981) |

Professional ratings
Review scores
| Source | Rating |
|---|---|
| AllMusic | 4.5/5 stars |
| Record Collector | 4/5 stars |
| The Rolling Stone Album Guide | 4/5 stars |

Half-Mute is the debut studio album by American post-punk band Tuxedomoon, released on March 15, 1980, by Ralph Records. It was their first long-form record, after two EPs, 1978's No Tears and 1979's Scream with a View. Half-Mute was reissued on CD in 1985 by Cramboy, bundled together with Scream with a View. The album's cover art is by Patrick Roques.

== Track listing ==
All tracks are written by Steven Brown, Peter Dachert and Blaine L. Reininger.

Side one
| No. | Title | Length |
|---|---|---|
| 1. | "Nazca" | 3:07 |
| 2. | "59 to 1" | 3:58 |
| 3. | "Fifth Column" | 2:55 |
| 4. | "Tritone (Musica Diablo)" | 2:50 |
| 5. | "Loneliness" | 2:56 |

Side two
| No. | Title | Length |
|---|---|---|
| 1. | "James Whale" | 2:42 |
| 2. | "What Use?" | 4:01 |
| 3. | "Volo Vivace" | 2:48 |
| 4. | "7 Years" | 3:08 |
| 5. | "KM/Seeding the Clouds" | 11:39 |

1985 CD issue bonus tracks
| No. | Title | Music | Lyrics/Vocals | Length |
|---|---|---|---|---|
| 11. | "Nervous Guy" (from Scream with a View) | Reininger | Reininger | 5:11 |
| 12. | "Where Interests Lie" (from Scream with a View) | Dachert | Brown | 4:07 |
| 13. | "(Special Treatment for the) Family Man" (from Scream with a View) | Brown | Brown | 5:10 |
| 14. | "Midnite Stroll" (from Scream with a View) | Michael Belfer | Belfer | 3:21 |

== Personnel ==
Adapted from the Half-Mute liner notes.

Tuxedomoon

- Steven Brown – alto saxophone, soprano saxophone, keyboards, synthesizer, drum programming, lead vocals
- Peter Dachert (as Peter Principle) – bass guitar, guitar, synthesizer, drum programming
- Blaine L. Reininger – violin, guitar, bass guitar, keyboards, synthesizer, drum programming, spoken word (A2)

Production and additional personnel

- Jim Renney – engineering
- Patrick Roques – cover art
- Tuxedomoon – production, arrangement

== Charts ==
| Chart (1980) | Peak position |
|---|---|
| UK Independent Albums (Record Business) | 10 |

| Chart (2016) | Peak position |
|---|---|
| Belgian Albums (Ultratop Flanders) | 198 |
| Belgian Albums (Ultratop Wallonia) | 135 |

== Release history ==
| Region | Date | Label | Format | Catalog |
|---|---|---|---|---|
| United States | 1980 | Ralph | LP | TX8004 |
| France | 1980 | Celluloid | LP | 529806 |
| Belgium | 1985 | Cramboy | LP | CBoy 1010 |
| Belgium | 1985 | Cramboy | CD | CBoy 1040 |
| United States | 1988 | Ralph | CD | 80042 |
| Belgium | 2016 | Cramboy | CD | CBoy 1011 |
