= Troubador Press =

Troubador Press was an independent publishing company founded in 1956 by Malcolm Whyte and Brayton "Brady" Harris in San Francisco, California. Initially focused on greeting cards, the company expanded into a diverse array of illustrated books, including coloring book, trivia games, and collaborations with major artists and authors.

== History ==
Troubador Press began in 1956 when Whyte and Harris, then U.S. Navy officers stationed in California, saw an opportunity to improve upon the humorous "Slim Jim" cards popular at the time. They started screen-printing cards in their rented room at the Pensioner’s Hotel in San Francisco, drawing inspiration from Shakespearean quotes and mid-century aesthetics.

In 1958, co-founder Brayton "Brady" Harris established an East Coast branch of Troubador Press in Greenwich Village, New York. During this period, the company briefly operated an imprint called "Troubador Poets", which focused on publishing contemporary poets associated with the emerging Beat movement. Troubador Press was involved in the early production of Yugen magazine, a notable Beat poetry journal. Issues 1 and 2 of Yugen were printed by Troubador Press with layout and production handled by Harris. After Harris returned to San Francisco, Amiri Baraka (then known as LeRoi Jones) continued publishing Yugen through his own Totem Press and later Aardvark Press, completing issues 3 through 8.

Harris later reflected that the Troubador Poets imprint and other off-Broadway projects in New York were ultimately unprofitable, prompting his full return to San Francisco. From approximately 1959 to 1967, Harris and Malcolm Whyte collaborated on printing and publishing poetry for City Lights Books, working closely with Lawrence Ferlinghetti. During this time, Troubador Press became a major printer for the Beat poetry scene, producing work by poets such as Allen Ginsberg, Jack Spicer, and Robert Creeley.

Following the departure of Harris in 1961, Whyte expanded Troubador’s offerings beyond cards. In 1967, Troubador published its first coloring book, The Fat Cat Coloring & Limerick Book, illustrated by Donna Sloan. The book’s success led to the company’s transition into illustrated publications. By the 1970s, Troubador was publishing an eclectic catalog of books, including collaborations with notable figures such as Edward Gorey, Morrie Turner, Larry Todd, Gompers Saijo, and Greg Irons.

Troubador Press became known for producing high-quality, large-format coloring books featuring intricate artwork, particularly in the coloring book market. Notable titles include The Black & White Coloring Book (1969), Gorey Games (1979), and The Advanced Dungeons & Dragons Coloring Album (1979), the latter created in collaboration with Dungeons & Dragons co-creator Gary Gygax.

In 1981, Whyte sold Troubador Press to Price Stern Sloan (PSS) but continued as Editorial Director, producing books under the Troubador imprint until 1996. The Putnam Publishing Group (now the Penguin Group, and now part of Penguin Random House) bought Price Stern Sloan in 1993, and in 1997 the headquarters were moved to New York. Though Penguin Random House still publishes titles that used to be published by Price Stern Sloan, they no longer use Price Stern Sloan as an imprint.

== Notable publications ==
- The Fat Cat Coloring & Limerick Book (1967) by Malcom Whyte
- The Black & White Coloring Book (1969) by Morrie Turner
- The Occult Coloring Book (1971) by Saijo Gompers
- Monster Gallery (1973) by Mark Sovee
- Science Fiction Anthology (1974) by Ken and Mark Savee
- Tales of Fantasy (1975) by Larry Todd
- The Advanced Dungeons & Dragons Coloring Album (1979) by Greg Irons
- Gorey Games (1979) by Edward Gorey and Larry Evans

== Legacy ==
Troubador Press played a pivotal role in the evolution of independent publishing, particularly in the niche markets of comics, fantasy art, and interactive books. The company was acquired by Price Stern Sloan in 1981, but Whyte continued to contribute as Editorial Director until 1996.
