= You (Tuxedomoon album) =

Studio album by Tuxedomoon
- Released: 1987
- Recorded: January 1987
- Studio: Daylight Studios (Brussels, BE)
- Genre: Post-punk, new wave
- Length: 44:46
- Label: Cramboy
- Producer: Frankie Lievaart, Gilles Martin, Tuxedomoon

Tuxedomoon chronology
Ship of Fools (1986)	You (1987)	Pinheads on the Move (1987)

Professional ratings
Review scores
Source	Rating
Allmusic	3/5 stars

You is the sixth studio album by American post-punk band Tuxedomoon, released in 1987 by Cramboy.

== Track listing ==
No.	Title	Writer(s)	Length
1.	"Roman P."	Peter Dachert, Ivan Georgiev	3:20
2.	"The Train"	Steven Brown, Peter Dachert, Ivan Georgiev	4:33
3.	"2000"	Steven Brown, Luc Van Lieshout	5:13
4.	"Never Ending Story"	Steven Brown, Peter Dachert, Ivan Georgiev	7:40
5.	"Stockholm"	Steven Brown, Peter Dachert, Luc Van Lieshout	3:23
6.	"Boxman (Mr. Niles)"	Bruce Geduldig	2:23
7.	"Spirits & Ghosts"	Steven Brown, Peter Dachert, Ivan Georgiev, Luc Van Lieshout	7:42
8.	"Boxman (The City)"	Peter Dachert, Bruce Geduldig, Ivan Georgiev	2:24
9.	"You"	Steven Brown, Ralph Saver	5:38
10.	"Boxman (Home)"	Bruce Geduldig	2:30

== Personnel ==
Adapted from the You liner notes.

Tuxedomoon

- Steven Brown – saxophone, keyboards, vocals
- Peter Dachert (as Peter Principle) – bass guitar, guitar
- Ivan Georgiev – keyboards, bass guitar
- Bruce Geduldig – vocals
- Luc Van Lieshout – trumpet, keyboards

Production and additional personnel

- Frankie Lievaart – production, recording
- Saskia Lupini – cover art
- Gilles Martin – production, recording
- Tuxedomoon – production

== Release history ==
Region	Date	Label	Format	Catalog
Belgium	1987	Cramboy	CD, LP	CBoy 9090
Spain	1987	DRO	LP	4D-238
Germany	1987	Normal	LP	NORMAL 53
