= No Tears (EP) =

EP by Tuxedomoon
- Released: 1978
- Genre: Post-punk, synthpunk
- Length: 18:24
- Producer: Tom Tadlock, Tuxedomoon

Tuxedomoon chronology
No Tears (1978)	Scream with a View (1979)

No Tears is an EP by Tuxedomoon, independently released in 1978.

== Track listing ==
All tracks are written by Steven Brown, Peter Dachert and Blaine L. Reininger.

Side one
No.	Title	Length
1.	"New Machine"	4:22
2.	"Litebulb Overkill"	3:12

Side two
No.	Title	Length
1.	"Nite & Day (Hommage à Cole Porter)"	5:11
2.	"No Tears"	5:39

== Accolades ==
Year	Publication	Country	Accolade	Rank
2006	Blow Up	Italy	100 Songs to Remember	20

== Personnel ==
Adapted from the No Tears liner notes.

Tuxedomoon

- Michael Belfer – guitar, EBow
- Steven Brown – vocals, synthesizer, drum programming
- Blaine L. Reininger – violin, guitar, backing vocals
- Winston Tong – vocals, cover art
- Paul Zahl – drums, drum programming

Production and additional personnel

- Adrian Craig – executive producer
- Victoria Lowe – photography
- Tom Tadlock – production
- Tuxedomoon – production, arrangement

== Release history ==
Region	Date	Label	Format	Catalog
United States	1979	Time Release	LP	TR-EP 101
Italy	1983	Expanded Music	LP	EX 36Y
Belgium	1985	Cramboy	LP	CBoy 7070
United States	2013	Superior Viaduct	CD	SV036
