= Winston Tong =

- Born: 1951 (age 74–75)
- Origin: San Francisco, California
- Occupations: Singer/songwriter, puppeteer, actor/playwright, visual artist
- Instrument: Vocals (Baritone)
- Years active: 1977–present
- Labels: LTM, Crammed Discs
- Website: winstontong.com

Winston Tong (born 1951 in San Francisco, California) is an actor, playwright, visual artist, puppeteer, and singer-songwriter. He is best known for his vocals in Tuxedomoon and for winning an Obie award in puppetry for Bound Feet in 1978.

== Early years ==
Tong was born in the United States to Chinese parents exiled by the Communist revolution. He graduated with a degree in theatre from the California Institute of Arts in 1973. While at CalArts, he studied classical vocals with Marni Nixon. In 1969, Tong was commissioned to illustrate The Dinosaur Coloring Book by Malcolm Whyte, which was first published by Troubador Press and later by Price Stern Sloan.

== Performance art ==
After graduating from California Institute of the Arts, Tong established his reputation in the Bay Area with a string of charismatic, left-field performance pieces such as Wild Boys, Eliminations, Frankie and Johnnie and the award-winning Bound Feet, which was loosely based on traditional Chinese puppet theater.

Tong performed three of his solo pieces at La MaMa Experimental Theatre Club in April/May 1978. The Wild Boys, identified on the show's program as a work in progress, incorporated work by William Burroughs, Brian Eno, George Olsen, Kawahara, Victoria Lowe, and Tuxedomoon. Bound Feet incorporated music by Erik Satie. À Rimbaud incorporated work by Arthur Rimbaud and Heitor Villa-Lobos. He returned to La MaMa with Tuxedomoon bandmate Bruce Geduldig in 1978 to perform two pieces, Nijinsky (Fragments) from the diary of Vaslav Nijinsky with music by Frederic Chopin and Bound Feet (Reformed).

Frankie and Johnnie appeared in the 1981 documentary film Theater in Trance by Rainer Werner Fassbinder, who shot the film at the Theaters of the World Festival in June 1981 in Cologne. Geduldig directed himself and Tong in a production of Frankie and Johnnie at La MaMa Experimental Theatre Club in 1982.

== Musical career ==
Tong joined Tuxedomoon in 1977. He sporadically recorded and performed live with the group, and also recorded solo material including the electropop dance album Theoretically Chinese in 1985, a 9-song album produced by Alan Rankine featuring guests such as Stephen Morris of New Order, Dave Formula, and Jah Wobble, as well as many other familiar musicians from Tong's past. The album and its subsequent singles, "Theoretical China" and "Reports From The Heart", were released on Les Disques du Crepuscule.

His composition "In a Manner of Speaking" from 1985's Holy Wars was later covered by Martin Gore, Nouvelle Vague, and Amanda Palmer, and remains his best known song. Tong left Tuxedomoon in 1985.

In March 2005, Tong reunited with Tuxedomoon for two performances in San Francisco, the first time they had performed together in over twenty years.

Tong's career, including his solo work, is detailed in Isabelle Corbisier's 2008 book on Tuxedomoon, Music for Vagabonds – the Tuxedomoon Chronicles.

== Discography ==
=== With Tuxedomoon ===
- Joe Boy... The Electronic Ghost / Pinheads "O.T.M." (7-inch) 1978
- No Tears (12"-inch) 1978
- The Stranger / Love No Hope" (7-inch) 1979
- Desire 1981
- Joeboy in Rotterdam / Joeboy San Francisco 1981
- Divine 1982
- Ninotchka / Again (12-inch) 1982
- Suite en Sous-Sol (2x12-inch) 1982
- Time to Lose/Blind (12-inch) 1982
- A Thousand Lives By Picture 1983
- Soma (7-inch) 1984
- Holy Wars 1985

=== Solo ===
- Stranger (7-inch) 1979
- Like The Others (7-inch) 1983, Les Disques Du Crepuscule
- Theoretical China (12-inch with Niki Mono) 1984, Les Disques Du Crepuscule
- Reports From The Heart 1985, Les Disques Du Crepuscule
- Theoretically Chinese 1985, Les Disques Du Crepuscule
- Broken English (remix; 12-inch; released in Italy) 1986
- Like The Others 1990
- Miserere 2003, LTM Recordings
- Theoretically Chinese (reissue on LTM Recordings) 2005

=== Guest ===
- "Quietude": Guest vocals & lyrics with Strange Attractor ("Mettle" CD & "The Unperceived Image" 7", Music for Speakers 2007)
