= Tuxedomoon =

American post-punk/new wave band

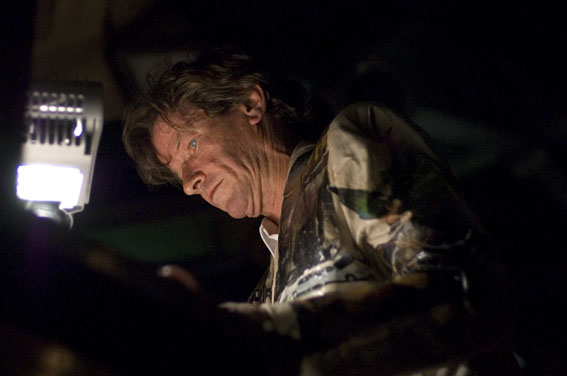
- Tuxedomoon live in 2007

Background information
- Origin: San Francisco, California, United States
- Genres: Experimental; post-punk; new wave; synth-punk
- Years active: 1977–present
- Labels: Ralph, Crammed Discs
- Members: Blaine L. Reininger; Steven Brown; Luc Van Lieshout; David Haneke
- Past members: Peter Principle; Bruce Geduldig; Winston Tong; Gregory Cruikshank; Greg Langston; Victoria Lowe; Michael Belfer; Paul Zahl; Ivan Georgiev; Nikolas Klau; George Kakanakis; Marcia Barcellos
- Website: www.tuxedomoon.co

Tuxedomoon is an experimental, post-punk, new wave band from San Francisco, California, United States. The band formed in the late 1970s at the beginning of the punk rock movement. Pulling influence from punk and electronic music, the group, originally consisting of Steven Brown (born Steven Allan Brown on August 23, 1952, in Chicago, Illinois) and Blaine L. Reininger, used electronic violins, guitars, screaming vocals and synthesizers to develop a unique "cabaret no-wave" sound. Bassist Peter Principle (Peter Dachert, 1954–2017) joined the band and in 1979 they released the single "No Tears", which remains a post-punk cult classic. That year they also signed to Ralph Records and released their debut album, Half-Mute, in 1980. Eventually, Reininger left the group, and Tuxedomoon relocated to Europe, signing to Crammed Discs and releasing Holy Wars in 1985. The band separated in the early 1990s, only to reunite later that decade. They all have remained together since releasing the album Cabin in the Sky in 2004.

== History ==
In 1977, Tuxedomoon formed out of The Angels of Light, an artist collective and commune, a group in which Steven Brown was involved. He met Blaine L. Reininger in an electronic music class at San Francisco City College. Brown worked with Tommy Tadlock, of the Angels of Light, to create the final project of the class. Tadlock would go on to be Tuxedomoon's manager. Reininger and Brown started playing music together at Tadlock's house. Reininger played electronic violin and guitar. Tadlock assisted with the sound and audio. He also created tools for the band, including a "Treatment Mountain" – a pyramid made of plywood, which held all of Reininger's effects pedals.

They started playing music together in the mid-1970s, when punk rock was popular in the underground music scene. "The only rule was the tacit understanding that anything that sounded like anyone else was taboo", stated Brown on the band aiming to create music that sounded unlike anything else before. The vocals were screaming and inspired by punk rock, and the band used any instruments they had around, including saxophone, violin and a polymoog synthesizer. The band had no drummer. Bassist Peter Principle, performance artist Winston Tong and Bruce Geduldig, a filmmaker, joined the band during concerts. The band created new performances for each concert, creating theatrical performances and being described as "theatrical electronic cabaret". The band performed frequently with Pere Ubu, The Residents, Devo, and Cabaret Voltaire.

In 1979 they released the EP No Tears with the single "No Tears". The title track is described as "one of the best electro-punk hymns of all times". That year they also signed to Ralph Records and released their debut album, Half-Mute, in 1980.

== Career ==
=== 1980s ===
In 1980 the band released their first album, Half-Mute, on Ralph Records. The band toured Europe in 1980 and moved to New York City. While in New York, they performed in, and were featured on the soundtrack for the film Downtown 81. They gained popularity in the Netherlands and Belgium. They eventually relocated to Brussels. after spending some months in Rotterdam, playing in Arena, Hal 4 and returned in 1988 to Lantaren/Venster, where they contributed to the Bob Visser movie Plan Delta. Trumpet player Luc van Lieshout joined the band, followed shortly after by Ivan Georgiev. In 1987, the band performed on the soundtrack for the Wim Wenders film Wings of Desire. Tuxedomoon played in Athens, Greece, for the first time in December 1987, selling out the Pallas Theatre twice in one night.

=== 1990s ===
In the early 1990s, the band separated and did not reunite for approximately eight years. Tuxedomoon reunited to perform at the Next Festival in Tel Aviv. The band had not played together in eight years, when Brown called the members to come together for the concert. They rehearsed in a studio for 10 days, in Tel Aviv, before the concert. Brown credits the Next Festival concert as being the key event in reuniting the band.

=== 2000s ===
Tuxedomoon performed in 2000, playing acoustic and electronic concerts of previously recorded material.

Their 2004 album Cabin in the Sky would serve as their comeback record. The majority of the record is instrumental. Reininger's voice, which was compared to David Bowie's during Tuxedomoon's early career, has been described as evolving into "Tom Waits" and a wolf from Tex Avery's "Baron Brown", by music critic Rod Smith. Filmmaker Bruce Geduldig performs backup vocals on the album.

In 2006 the band released Bardo Hotel on Crammed Discs. Recorded in San Francisco, the album is a soundtrack to a film by George Kakanakis, which at the time of the album's release, remained unfinished. The album and film are named after the book Beat Museum – Bardo Hotel by Brion Gysin, which is named after the Bardo Hotel in Paris. The soundtrack and film pulled influence from Gysin's "cut-up" method, which was co-developed with William S. Burroughs. The recording features samples of airplane sounds, BART announcements and other found sounds. New Orleans jazz and opera are two influences for the album's sound.

Tuxedomoon released the album Vapour Trails on Crammed Discs in 2007. The album was recorded at Reininger's home. The band uses instruments like clarinets and flugelhorns along with their standard instrument setup. In 2007, they also released a CD and DVD boxset of unreleased and rare music and videos.

=== 2010s ===
Various Tuxedomoon members have extensively collaborated with the UK band Cult With No Name, and as a group Tuxedomoon collaborated to produce the joint soundtrack album "Blue Velvet Revisited," (the documentary of which will appear as a feature on the Criterion Collection's DVD and Blu-ray Special Edition of Blue Velvet). Members have also joined the FuturePlaces medialab for citizenship in 2010, 2011 and 2013, their participation documented in Bandcamp audio releases.

The Box, a 10-vinyl boxed set containing 9 of Tuxedomoon's major albums, as well as an album of previously unreleased material, came out in November 2015.

Geduldig (born Bruce Frederick Geduldig on March 7, 1953, in California) died on March 7, 2016, in Sacramento, California, he was 63 years old. David Haneke took over Geduldig's duties in Tuxedomoon for their 2016 tour.

Peter Principle died on July 17, 2017, at the age of 62, in Brussels. (Obituaries incorrectly stated his age as 63.)

== Legacy ==
The band Factrix called Tuxedomoon mentors.

Scooter's "My Eyes Are Dry" from their album Mind The Gap is a cover version of "No Tears" with additional sections.

== Musical style ==
Steven Brown cites the band's early influences as "Eno, Bowie, John Cage, Bernard Herrmann, Nino Rota, Igor Stravinsky and Ennio Morricone". Later and current influences include Radiohead, Claude Debussy, Miles Davis, Michael Nyman and the Velvet Underground. Their music finds influence in genres such as punk rock, jazz, funk, chamber music, tango, and post-punk.

Music critic Simon Reynolds wrote that their sound has an "aura of jaded elegance", with a more European style musically versus what their American counterparts were creating at the time of the band's formation. Seattle Weekly described their music as radiating "a discomfort that hints of existential hives".

Lyrically, Tuxedomoon examined society, culture and psychology. "Holiday for Plywood", on Desire, examined consumerism and paranoia.

== Discography ==
=== Main studio albums ===
- Half-Mute (1980) - Includes all tracks from Scream with a View (1979 EP)
- Desire (1981) - Includes all tracks from No Tears (1978 EP)
- Divine (1982)
- Holy Wars (1985)
- Ship of Fools (1986)
- You (1987)
- The Ghost Sonata (1991)
- Cabin in the Sky (2004)
- Vapour Trails (2007)
- Pink Narcissus (2014)

=== As Joeboy ===
- Joeboy in Rotterdam (1981)
- Joeboy in Mexico (1997)

=== EPs and soundtracks ===
- Suite en sous-sol (1982)
- Bardo Hotel Soundtrack (2006)
- Blue Velvet Revisited, with Cult With No Name (2015)
