= The Dark Side of the Moon 50th Anniversary =

2023 box set by Pink Floyd

Box set by Pink Floyd
- Released: 24 March 2023
- Recorded: 31 May 1972 – 9 February 1973 (studio); 15–16 November 1974 (live)
- Venues: Empire Pool, Wembley Park, London
- Studios: EMI Studios, London
- Length: 126:25
- Label: Pink Floyd Records

Pink Floyd chronology
The Later Years (2019)	The Dark Side of the Moon 50th Anniversary (2023)	Wish You Were Here 50 (2025)

Singles from The Dark Side of the Moon 50th Anniversary
- 1. "Brain Damage" Released: 19 January 2023; 2. "The Great Gig in the Sky" Released: 10 February 2023; 3. "Us and Them (Live at Wembley 1974)" Released: 25 February 2023; 4. "Breathe (In the Air) (Live at Wembley 1974)" Released: 1 March 2023; 5. "Time (7" single edit)" Released: 16 March 2023

Alternative cover

The Dark Side of the Moon 50th Anniversary is a box set reissue of English progressive rock band Pink Floyd's original 1973 album. It was released on 24 March 2023 by Pink Floyd Records. Five digital-only singles were released to support the set.

== Contents ==
The box set features a 2023 remaster of The Dark Side of the Moon album by James Guthrie presented on vinyl and CD; a remastered version of The Dark Side of the Moon Live at Wembley 1974 on vinyl and CD; two BDs and a DVD featuring 5.1 surround sound mix (2003), Dolby Atmos mix (2023), and a high-quality version of the stereo mix. Other items featured in the set include a 160-page hardcover book of photographs from the 1973 – 1974 tours by Jill Furmanovsky, Aubrey Powell, Peter Christopherson, and Storm Thorgerson; a 76-page songbook containing sheet music of the original album; two seven-inch singles of "Money"/"Any Colour You Like" and "Time"/"Us and Them"; a replica pamphlet and invitation to the album launch event at the London Planetarium on 27 February 1973; and four posters - two of which are replicas of the original posters supplied with the album. The hardcover book and the Wembley live album are also available as standalone editions. This also marks the first time that The Dark Side of the Moon Live at Wembley 1974 has been available on vinyl and as a standalone release. It was previously available only as part of Immersion and Experience editions of the album (2011).

== Related events ==
Similar to the 1973 planetarium showcase, the album played in planetariums, globally, throughout March 2023.

During the week leading up to the box set's release a series of short videos were released on the Pink Floyd YouTube channel entitled 50 Years in a Heartbeat – the Making of The Dark Side of the Moon which include archival footage of the band speaking about the album and new footage of those involved with the design on the 50th anniversary set.

On 19 January 2023, a video was uploaded to Pink Floyd's YouTube channel, featuring Nick Mason announcing the Dark Side animation competition. Professionals and students were to create and submit music videos of the tracks on the album. A year later, the winners were selected by Mason, Aubrey Powell, and the British Film Institute and announced on 29 March 2024. The winning animation was of "Brain Damage", animated by Georgian animators Rati Dabrundashvili and Nastassja Nikitina. The contest faced backlash when the chosen animation for "Any Colour You Like" was created using AI text-to-image model Stable Diffusion. Pink Floyd's YouTube channel featured playlists of all the winning submissions for the contest.

== Track listing ==
=== The Dark Side of the Moon (2023 remaster) ===
All lyrics are written by Roger Waters. Vocal composition on "The Great Gig in the Sky" by Clare Torry. (Note: All post-2005 pressings including "The Great Gig in the Sky" credit both Wright and Torry for the song, as per her successful court challenge. Since 2011 she has been specifically credited with "vocal composition".) The track running times are for the CD edition of the 2023 remaster which differs slightly from previous versions.

Side one
No.	Title	Music	Lead vocals	Length
1.	"Speak to Me"	Nick Mason	Instrumental	1:12
2.	"Breathe (In the Air)"	Richard Wright; David Gilmour	Gilmour	2:46
3.	"On the Run"	Waters; Gilmour	Instrumental	3:33
4.	"Time"	Waters; Gilmour; Wright; Mason	Gilmour; Wright	7:06
5.	"The Great Gig in the Sky"	Wright	Torry	4:44
Total length:				19:21

Side two
No.	Title	Music	Lead vocals	Length
6.	"Money"	Waters	Gilmour	6:22
7.	"Us and Them"	Wright	Gilmour	7:50
8.	"Any Colour You Like"	Gilmour; Mason; Wright	Instrumental	3:26
9.	"Brain Damage"	Waters	Waters	3:50
10.	"Eclipse"	Waters	Waters	2:09
Total length:				23:37 42:58

=== The Dark Side of the Moon Live at Wembley 1974 ===
Running times are for the CD and digital versions. The LP version has shorter versions of "Money", "Any Colour You Like", and "Eclipse".

Side one
No.	Title	Length
1.	"Speak to Me"	2:46
2.	"Breathe (In the Air)"	2:51
3.	"On the Run"	5:09
4.	"Time"	6:32
5.	"The Great Gig in the Sky"	6:50
Total length:		24:08

Side two
No.	Title	Length
6.	"Money"	8:41
7.	"Us and Them"	8:10
8.	"Any Colour You Like"	8:11
9.	"Brain Damage"	3:44
10.	"Eclipse"	2:19
Total length:		31:05 55:13

"Money"/"Any Colour You Like" 7" single

Side 1
No.	Title	Length
1.	"Money"	4:02

Side 2
No.	Title	Length
1.	"Any Colour You Like"	3:15
Total length:		7:17

"Us And Them"/"Time" 7" Single

Side 1
No.	Title	Length
1.	"Us And Them"	3:17

Side 2
No.	Title	Length
1.	"Time"	3:33
Total length:		6:50

== Personnel ==
The Dark Side of the Moon

Pink Floyd

- David Gilmour – vocals, guitars, EMS Synthi AKS
- Nick Mason – drums, percussion, tape effects
- Roger Waters – bass guitar, vocals, VCS 3, tape effects
- Richard Wright – organ (Hammond and Farfisa), piano, electric piano (Wurlitzer and Rhodes), VCS 3, Synthi AKS, vocals

Additional musicians

- Dick Parry – saxophone on "Us and Them" and "Money"
- Clare Torry – vocals on "The Great Gig in the Sky"
- Doris Troy – backing vocals
- Lesley Duncan – backing vocals
- Liza Strike – backing vocals
- Barry St. John – backing vocals

Production

- Alan Parsons – engineering
- Peter James – assistant engineer
- Chris Thomas – mix supervisor
- James Guthrie – mastering
- Joel Plante – mastering

Design

- Hipgnosis – sleeve design, photography
- Storm Thorgerson – prism photography
- Tony May – prism photography
- George Hardie – sleeve art, stickers art
- Roger Waters – Heartbeat graphic concept
- Peter Curzon – reissue design
- StormStudios – reissue design

The Dark Side of the Moon Live at Wembley 1974

Pink Floyd

- David Gilmour – guitars, vocals, Hammond organ on "The Great Gig in the Sky"
- Roger Waters – bass, vocals
- Richard Wright – keyboards, vocals, Azimuth Co-ordinator
- Nick Mason – drums, percussion

with

- Dick Parry – saxophones
- The Blackberries – backing vocals, lead vocals on "The Great Gig in the Sky"
  - Vanetta Fields
  - Carlena Williams

== Charts ==
Chart performance for The Dark Side of the Moon 50th Anniversary
Chart (2023–2026)	Peak position
Australian Albums (ARIA)	12
Italian Physical Albums (FIMI)	15
New Zealand Albums (RMNZ)	19
Portuguese Albums (AFP)	27
Swedish Albums (Sverigetopplistan)	26

Chart performance for The Dark Side of the Moon Live at Wembley 1974
Chart (2023)	Peak position
Belgian Albums (Ultratop Flanders)	9
Belgian Albums (Ultratop Wallonia)	6
Canadian Albums (Billboard)	59
Croatian International Albums (HDU)	1
Danish Albums (Hitlisten)	17
Dutch Albums (Album Top 100)	4
French Albums (SNEP)	12
Hungarian Albums (MAHASZ)	3
Japanese Albums (Oricon)	18
Japanese Hot Albums (Billboard Japan)	28
Polish Albums (ZPAV)	89
Portuguese Albums (AFP)	1
Scottish Albums (Official Charts)	3
Spanish Albums (Promusicae)	10
UK Albums (Official Charts)	4
UK Rock & Metal Albums (Official Charts)	2
US Billboard 200	49
US Top Rock Albums (Billboard)	9
