= Dark Side of the Moon Tour =

1972–1973 concert tour by Pink Floyd

- Tour by Pink Floyd
- Poster to the concert in Portland, USA
- Location: Europe; Japan; North America
- Associated album: The Dark Side of the Moon
- Start date: 20 January 1972
- End date: 4 November 1973
- No. of shows: 128 (135 scheduled)

Pink Floyd concert chronology
- Meddle Tour (1971); Dark Side of the Moon Tour (1972–1973); 1974 tours (1974)

The Dark Side of the Moon Tour was a concert tour by English rock band Pink Floyd in 1972 and 1973 in support of their album The Dark Side of the Moon, covering the UK, US, Europe and Japan. There were two separate legs promoting the album, one in 1972 before the album's release and another in 1973 afterwards, together covering 128 shows.

Pink Floyd had worked out a basic structure of Dark Side of the Moon in late 1971, and played it at almost every gig the following year, alongside a set of earlier live favourites. Various changes to the structure were made throughout this time, as songs were tightened up and arrangements changed. By 1973, the album was finished and the live performance resembled the completed work. To re-create it in concert, the group added saxophonist Dick Parry and female backing singers to the show. The stage performance was enhanced with extra visual effects and an improved quadrophonic sound system. The success of Dark Side of the Moon and the US top 20 hit "Money" increased Pink Floyd's profile and they began to play sell-out stadium shows, though the audience changed from being one that would quietly listen to one that just wanted to dance and hear hit songs.

== 1972 ==
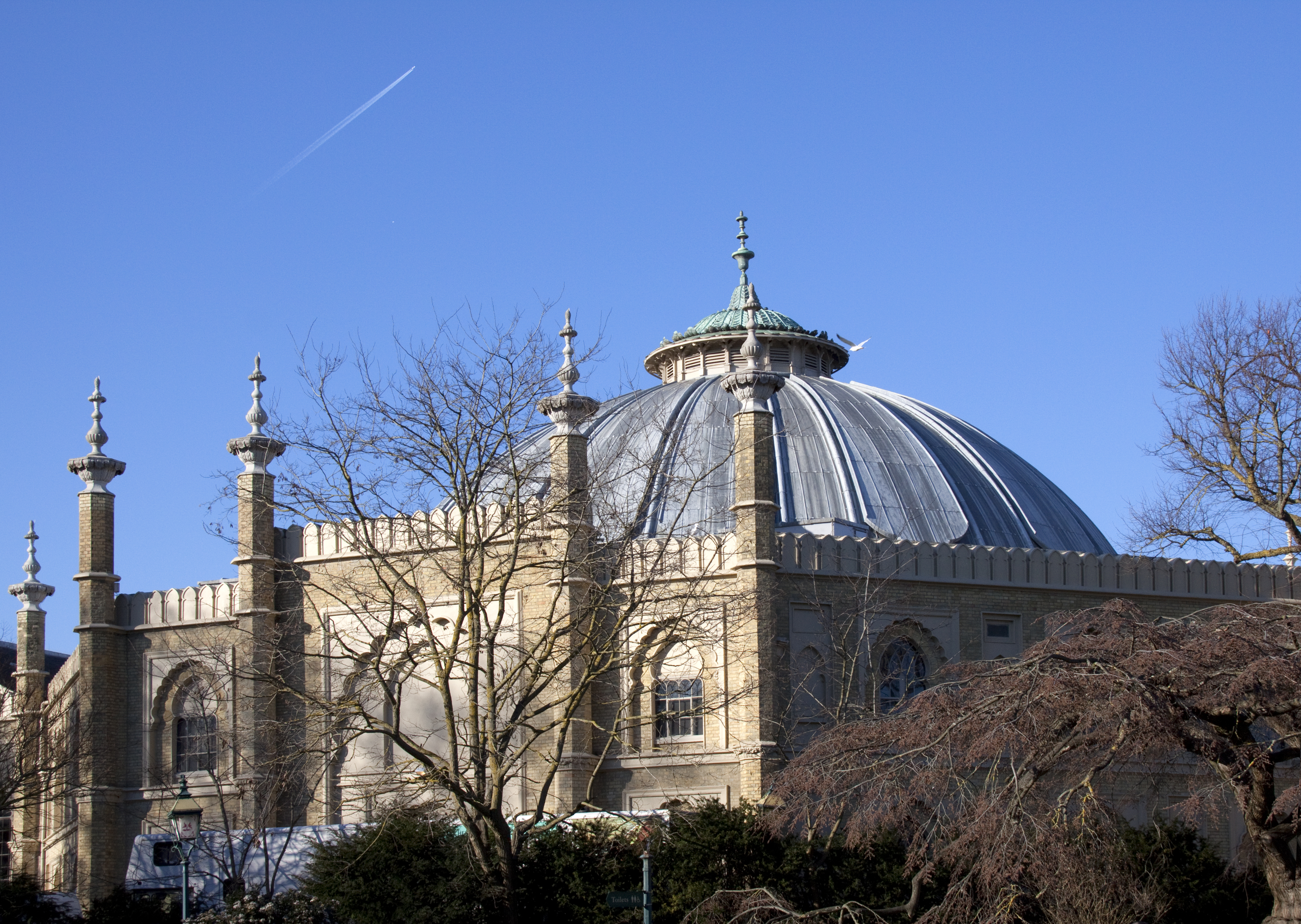
Brighton Dome, the first date of the tour

Pink Floyd planned their first UK wide tour since 1969 for the start of 1972. They were worried that their stage show was becoming stale, and decided they needed a new piece of music for the upcoming tour. Shortly after the release of the album Meddle, the group booked Decca Studios, Hampstead from 29 November – 10 December 1971 to write new material that would form part of a stage show. The group booked a warehouse owned by the Rolling Stones in Bermondsey to rehearse the new suite of music, followed by a dress rehearsal at the Rainbow Theatre, London, where they tested a new Watkins Electric Music PA system designed by Bill Kelsey, which had a complete quadrophonic sound system. The group hired lighting engineer Arthur Max, who they had met two years earlier playing at the Fillmore West, San Francisco, to design a new rig for the tour.

Playing 89 shows in 1972, the most until 1994, Pink Floyd debuted the new suite live on 20 January at the Brighton Dome. Partway through, when playing "Money", a lack of power led to the backing tape slowing down and going out of time, causing the group to stop. After a break, they came back and played "Atom Heart Mother" instead. The first complete performance was the following day at the Portsmouth Guildhall. At the Free Trade Hall, Manchester, the power failed 25 minutes into the show, and the rest of the concert was abandoned. Two extra shows were booked on 29 and 30 March to make up for this.

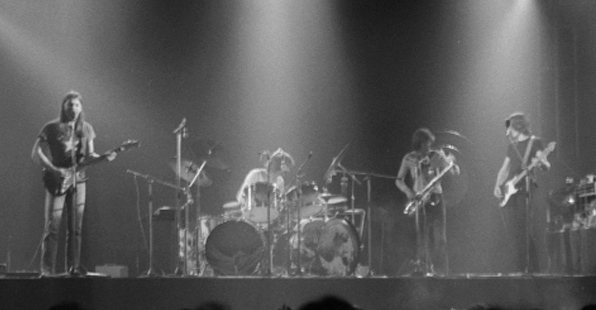
Performing Dark Side of the Moon at Earl's Court Arena in May 1973

The title of the suite was originally Dark Side of the Moon – A Piece for Assorted Lunatics, the name under which it made its press debut in February 1972. The title was changed to Eclipse after it was discovered that Medicine Head had released an album with the same name. The title changed for the first part of the US tour to Eclipse (A Piece for Assorted Lunatics) during April and May before reverting to Dark Side of the Moon – A Piece for Assorted Lunatics at the end of September for the second part of the US tour, and finally released in 1973 as The Dark Side of the Moon.

Dark Side of the Moon was performed differently to the finished album, and evolved over the year. Although Pink Floyd had previously rehearsed material before recording it, taking it on tour first allowed the piece to be improved and strengthened. They also knew that their audience were happy to sit patiently and listen to the group, which gave them the confidence to play over 40 minutes of new material they had not heard. "On the Run", whose working title was "The Travel Sequence", was at first a guitar and keyboard jam and would remain so for the rest of the year's performances. "Time" was played at a slower speed, and the line "Lying supine in the sunshine" was sung instead of "Tired of lying in the sunshine". "The Great Gig in the Sky", whose working title was "Religion" or "The Mortality Sequence", originally consisted of an organ solo and various tapes of "preachers" either preaching or reading from such passages as from Chapter 5, Verse 13 of Ephesians, a book of the Bible, or reciting the Lord's Prayer, including soundbites from broadcaster Malcolm Muggeridge. Initially, the suite ended with "Brain Damage". Roger Waters felt there needed to be a suitable ending, and wrote "Eclipse" as a finale. It made its debut at a gig at De Montfort Hall, Leicester on 10 February.

The first London performance, and the first to the press was on 17 February 1972 at the Rainbow Theatre, where the band played for four consecutive nights, following which the group took a break from touring to work on the soundtrack album Obscured by Clouds. A bootleg recording of the concerts was released and sold 100,000 copies, annoying the band as it was still a work in progress. The tour then moved to Japan for five shows, and then to the US and Europe. The group headlined the British Rock Meeting festival at Germersheim, West Germany on 21 May and the Amsterdam Rock Circus at the Olympic Stadium, playing "Atom Heart Mother" instead of Dark Side of the Moon.

Following the European shows, recording began on The Dark Side of the Moon on 24 May, beginning with basic backing tracks derived from the live versions. As a replacement for the first Brighton Dome show which was abandoned during Dark Side of the Moon, Pink Floyd gave two concerts at the venue on 28 and 29 June. The latter show was filmed by Peter Clifton for inclusion on his film Sounds of the City. Clips of these were occasionally aired on television and the performance of "Careful with That Axe, Eugene" was on the various artists video Superstars in Concert.

The tour moved to the US in September. Engineer Alan Parsons was asked to run the front of house sound, setting a trend for Pink Floyd inviting studio personnel out on tour. Richard Wright had now written the piano music to "The Great Gig in the Sky", replacing the earlier "Mortality Suite" piece, and it was performed in the arrangement per the finished album, without vocals. On 22 September, the group played the Hollywood Bowl, which featured eight powered searchlights beaming rays from behind the Bowl's amphitheatre. They then played two dates at the Winterland Ballroom, San Francisco on 23 and 24 September. The group returned to the UK to play a sell-out charity show at the Empire Pool, Wembley on 21 October, supporting War on Want and Save the Children. This was followed by shows in Europe to the end of the year, with the final date at the Palais de Sports, Lyon on 10 December. By then, Dark Side of the Moon sounded close to the final album, except without any female vocals or saxophone, which would follow the next year.

=== Set list ===
First set – Dark Side of the Moon – A Piece for Assorted Lunatics or sometimes Eclipse – A Piece for Assorted Lunatics (except 21–22 May)

1. "Speak to Me"
2. "Breathe"
3. "The Travel Sequence" (precursor to "On the Run")
4. "Time"
5. "The Mortality Sequence" (precursor to "The Great Gig in the Sky", later a version of that track without female vocals)
6. "Money"
7. "Us and Them"
8. "Scat" (early version of "Any Colour You Like")
9. "Brain Damage"
10. "Eclipse" (after 10 February)

Second set

11. "One of These Days"
12. "Careful with That Axe, Eugene" (sometimes not performed)
13. "Set the Controls for the Heart of the Sun" (sometimes as an encore)
14. "Atom Heart Mother" (20 January, 6 March, 16 April, 21–22 May)
15. "Echoes" (occasionally as an encore)

Encore (when played):

- "A Saucerful of Secrets" (occasional, until 22 September)
- "Blues" (occasional)
- "Childhood's End" (1 and 9 December)

=== Roland Petit Ballet shows ===
In November 1972, during the middle of the tour's European leg, and again in January 1973, Pink Floyd performed with the Roland Petit Ballet. The set list for which their portion of the ballet was choreographed to was "One of These Days", "Careful with That Axe, Eugene", "Obscured by Clouds", "When You're In" and "Echoes". Some of the 1973 shows only featured the ballet playing to pre-recorded tracks, as the group were trying to finish recording The Dark Side of the Moon at this time. One of the last pieces to be recorded was Clare Torry's lead vocal on "Great Gig in the Sky" on 21 January during this run.

== 1973 ==
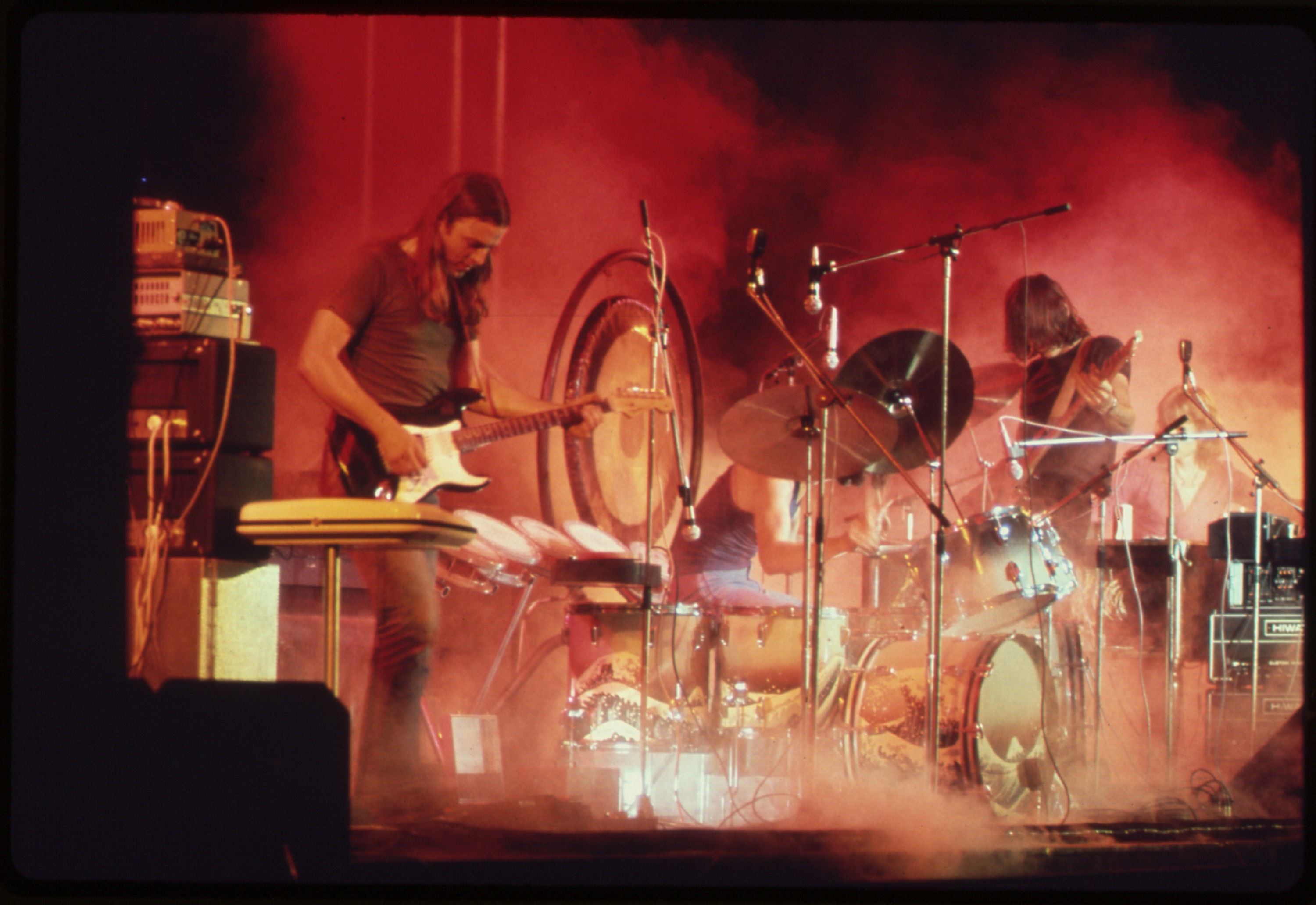
Playing at the Merriweather Post Pavilion, Columbia, Maryland, June 1973

Following the Roland Petit shows and the completion of the album, Pink Floyd booked further rehearsal time at the Rainbow Theatre from 19 to 21 February 1973 for an enhanced stage show based on the final recordings. Dark Side of the Moon was moved from the start of the show to the end of the main set. For the first time, the group took additional musicians with them; saxophonist Dick Parry (an old childhood friend of David Gilmour) and three female backing vocalists who had been touring with Leon Russell. The tour began in Madison, Wisconsin on 4 March. On 17 March, they performed at Radio City Music Hall, New York City at 1am, being transported onto stage from one of the elevators surrounded by dry ice, which drew strong press reviews. The show made use of a 20-speaker quadrophonic sound system.

Following the US tour, the band played two nights at Earl's Court on 18 and 19 May. In "Set the Controls for the Heart of the Sun", a gong played by Waters was lit up with flames. During Dark Side of the Moon, a 7-foot (2.1 m) plane crashed into the stage at the end of "On the Run".

The group returned to the US in June. Dark Side of the Moon had now topped the Billboard charts, and the single "Money" had become a top 20 hit. Having previously played halls and theatres, the tour now covered stadiums for the first time. Although all the shows sold out, the audience now included people who wanted to hear the hit singles and "boogie", in sharp contrast to earlier audiences who were happy to listen to whatever music Pink Floyd were playing. The tour closed with two European shows in October.

On 4 November 1973, Pink Floyd played two charity shows at London's Rainbow Theatre as a benefit for Robert Wyatt, formerly the drummer of UFO Club contemporaries Soft Machine, who had become paralysed after falling out of a window. The concerts raised a reported £10,000 for Wyatt. Clare Torry sang her vocal on "The Great Gig in the Sky" as it had appeared on the album. The shows were shortened to just "Dark Side of the Moon" and "Obscured By Clouds/When You're In" as encore. Pink Floyd then took a lengthy break from touring and did not play any further shows until June 1974.

=== Set list ===
First set

1. "Obscured by Clouds"
2. "When You're In"
3. "Childhood's End" (6–10 March)
4. "Set the Controls for the Heart of the Sun" (11 March onwards)
5. "Careful with That Axe, Eugene"
6. "Echoes" (opening number from 4–12 March)

Second set – The Dark Side of the Moon

1. "Speak to Me"
2. "Breathe"
3. "On the Run"
4. "Time"/"Breathe (Reprise)"
5. "The Great Gig in the Sky"
6. "Money"
7. "Us and Them"
8. "Any Colour You Like"
9. "Brain Damage"
10. "Eclipse"

Encore

1. "One of These Days"

== Tour dates ==
=== 1972 ===
List of 1972 concerts with date, city, country and venue
Date	City	Country	Venue
17 January	London	England	Rainbow Theatre, Finsbury Park – Rehearsals
18 January	London	England	Rainbow Theatre, Finsbury Park – Rehearsals
19 January	London	England	Rainbow Theatre, Finsbury Park – Rehearsals
20 January	Brighton	England	Brighton Dome (Note: First "Dark Side of the Moon" live performance interrupted at 'Money' due to technical problems)
21 January	Portsmouth	England	Portsmouth Guildhall (Note: First complete live performance of "Dark Side of the Moon")
22 January	Bournemouth	England	Bournemouth Winter Gardens
23 January	Southampton	England	Southampton Guildhall
27 January	Newcastle upon Tyne	England	Newcastle City Hall
28 January	Leeds	England	Leeds Town Hall
3 February	Coventry	England	Lanchester Polytechnic College Arts Festival – Locarno Ballroom
5 February	Bristol	England	Colston Hall
10 February	Leicester	England	De Montfort Hall
11 February	Manchester	England	Free Trade Hall (Note: Abandoned due to power failure)
12 February	Sheffield	England	Sheffield City Hall
13 February	Liverpool	England	Liverpool Empire Theatre
17 February	London	England	Rainbow Theatre
18 February	London	England	Rainbow Theatre
19 February	London	England	Rainbow Theatre
20 February	London	England	Rainbow Theatre
6 March	Tokyo	Japan	Tokyo Metropolitan Gymnasium
7 March	Tokyo	Japan	Tokyo Metropolitan Gymnasium
8 March	Osaka	Japan	Festival Hall
9 March	Osaka	Japan	Festival Hall
10 March	Kyoto	Japan	Dai-Sho-Gun Furitsu Taiikukan
13 March	Sapporo	Japan	Nakajima Sports Center
29 March	Manchester	England	Free Trade Hall (Note: Replacement shows for 11 February)
30 March	Manchester	England	Free Trade Hall
14 April	Tampa	United States	Fort Homer W. Hesterly Armory
15 April	Pembroke Pines	United States	Hollywood Sportatorium
16 April	Columbia	United States	Columbia Township Auditorium
18 April	Atlanta	United States	Atlanta Symphony Hall
20 April	Pittsburgh	United States	Syria Mosque
21 April	Baltimore	United States	Lyric Opera House
22 April	Akron	United States	Akron Civic Theatre
23 April	Cincinnati	United States	Music Hall
24 April	Cleveland	United States	Allen Theatre
26 April	Detroit	United States	Ford Auditorium
27 April	Detroit	United States	Ford Auditorium
28 April	Chicago	United States	Auditorium Theatre
29 April	Philadelphia	United States	Spectrum
1 May	New York City	United States	Carnegie Hall
2 May	New York City	United States	Carnegie Hall
3 May	Washington, D.C.	United States	John F. Kennedy Center for the Performing Arts
4 May	Boston	United States	Music Hall
18 May	West Berlin	West Germany	Deutschlandhalle
21 May	Germersheim	West Germany	Second British Rock Meeting
22 May	Amsterdam	Netherlands	Olympic Stadium
28 June	Brighton	England	Brighton Dome (Note: Replacement shows for 20 January)
29 June	Brighton	England	Brighton Dome
8 September	Austin	United States	Austin Municipal Auditorium
9 September	Houston	United States	Houston Music Hall
10 September	Dallas	United States	McFarlin Memorial Auditorium
11 September	Kansas City	United States	Memorial Hall
12 September	Oklahoma City	United States	Civic Center Music Hall
13 September	Wichita	United States	Levitt Arena
15 September	Tucson	United States	Tucson Community Center
16 September	San Diego	United States	Golden Hall
17 September	Tempe	United States	Big Surf
19 September	Denver	United States	University of Denver Arena
22 September	Los Angeles	United States	Hollywood Bowl
23 September	San Francisco	United States	Winterland Ballroom
24 September	San Francisco	United States	Winterland Ballroom
27 September	Vancouver	Canada	PNE Garden Auditorium
28 September	Portland	United States	Memorial Coliseum
29 September	Seattle	United States	Hec Edmundson Pavilion
30 September	Vancouver	Canada	PNE Garden Auditorium
21 October	London	England	Empire Pool
10 November	Copenhagen	Denmark	K.B. Hallen
11 November	Copenhagen	Denmark	K.B. Hallen
12 November	Hamburg	West Germany	Ernst-Merck-Halle
14 November	Düsseldorf	West Germany	Philips Halle
15 November	Böblingen	West Germany	Sporthalle
16 November	Frankfurt	West Germany	Festhalle Frankfurt
17 November	Frankfurt	West Germany	Festhalle Frankfurt
22 November	Marseille	France	Salle Vallier, Roland Petit Ballet
23 November	Marseille	France	Salle Vallier, Roland Petit Ballet
24 November	Marseille	France	Salle Vallier, Roland Petit Ballet
25 November	Marseille	France	Salle Vallier, Roland Petit Ballet
26 November	Marseille	France	Salle Vallier, Roland Petit Ballet
28 November	Toulouse	France	Palais des Sports
29 November	Poitiers	France	Parc des Expositions Les Arènes
1 December	Saint-Ouen	France	Centre sportif de l'Île de Vannes
2 December	Saint-Ouen	France	Centre sportif de l'Île de Vannes
3 December	Caen	France	Parc des Expositions
5 December	Brussels	Belgium	Forest National
7 December	Lille	France	Palais des Sports
8 December	Nancy	France	Parc des Expositions
9 December	Zürich	Switzerland	Hallenstadion
10 December	Lyon	France	Palais des Sports de Gerland

=== 1973 ===
List of 1973 concerts with date, city, country and venue
Date	City	Country	Venue
13 January	Paris	France	Palais des Sports, Roland Petit Ballet
14 January	Paris	France	Palais des Sports, Roland Petit Ballet
3 February	Paris	France	Palais des Sports, Roland Petit Ballet
4 February	Paris	France	Palais des Sports, Roland Petit Ballet
4 March	Madison	United States	Dane County Coliseum
5 March	Detroit	United States	Cobo Hall
6 March	St. Louis	United States	Kiel Auditorium
7 March	Chicago	United States	International Amphitheatre
8 March	Cincinnati	United States	Armory Fieldhouse
10 March	Kent	United States	Memorial Gym
11 March	Toronto	Canada	Maple Leaf Gardens
12 March	Montreal	Canada	Montreal Forum
14 March	Boston	United States	Music Hall
15 March	Philadelphia	United States	Spectrum
17 March	New York City	United States	Radio City Music Hall
18 March	Waterbury	United States	Palace Theater
19 March	Providence	United States	Providence Civic Center
22 March	Hampton	United States	Hampton Coliseum
23 March	Charlotte	United States	Charlotte Park Center
24 March	Atlanta	United States	Municipal Auditorium
18 May	London	England	Earls Court
19 May	London	England	Earls Court
17 June	Saratoga Springs	United States	Saratoga Performing Arts Center
18 June	Jersey City	United States	Roosevelt Stadium
19 June	Pittsburgh	United States	Civic Arena
20 June	Columbia	United States	Merriweather Post Pavilion
21 June	Columbia	United States	Merriweather Post Pavilion
22 June	Buffalo	United States	Buffalo Memorial Auditorium
23 June	Detroit	United States	Olympia Stadium
24 June	Cuyahoga Falls	United States	Blossom Music Center
25 June	Louisville	United States	Louisville Gardens
26 June	Jonesboro	United States	Lake Spivey Park
27 June	Jacksonville	United States	Jacksonville Veterans Memorial Coliseum
28 June	Pembroke Pines	United States	Hollywood Sportatorium
29 June	Tampa	United States	Tampa Stadium
12 October	Munich	West Germany	Olympiahalle
13 October	Vienna	Austria	Wiener Stadthalle
4 November (2 shows)	London	England	Rainbow Theatre

=== Cancelled shows ===
List of cancelled shows with date, city, country and venue
Date	City	Country	Venue
6 February 1972	Plymouth	England	ABC Theatre
11 March 1972	Yokohama	Japan	Kemin Hall
23 June 1972	Bièvres	France	Bièvres Festival
26 August 1972	Verona	Italy	Verona Arena
25 March 1973	St. Petersburg, Florida	United States	Bayfront Center
16 June 1973	Saratoga Springs, New York	United States	Saratoga Performing Arts Center
23 September 1973	Altrip	West Germany	Sandrennbahn Altrip

Source : Povey 2006 pp. 164–179

== Personnel ==
Pink Floyd

- David Gilmour – guitar, vocals
- Roger Waters – bass, vocals
- Richard Wright – keyboards, vocals
- Nick Mason – drums

Additional musicians

- Dick Parry – saxophone (1973)
- Nawasa Crowder, Mary Ann Lindsey, Phyllis Lindsey – backing vocals (March – June 1973)
- Blackberries (Billie Barnum, Venetta Fields, Clydie King) – backing vocals (October 1973)
- Vicki Brown, Liza Strike, Clare Torry – backing vocals ("A Benefit for Robert Wyatt", 4 November 1973)

Additional personnel

1972

- Chris Adamson, Seth Goldman, Bobby Richardson, Brian Scott – technician / stage crew
- Mick "The Pole" Kluczynski – tour manager
- Arthur Max – lighting technician
- Chris Mickie – front of house sound
- Peter Watts – head of PA

1973

- Chris Adamson, Robbie Williams – PA and stage technician
- Mick "The Pole" Kluczynski – tour manager
- Arthur Max – Production manager and lighting technician
- Robin Murray – Lighting technician
- Alan Parsons – front of house sound
- Peter Watts – head of PA
