= A Momentary Lapse of Reason Tour =

1987–1989 concert tour by Pink Floyd

- Tour by Pink Floyd
- Poster to the concert in Werchter, Belgium
- Location: Asia; Europe; North America; Oceania
- Associated album: A Momentary Lapse of Reason
- Start date: 9 September 1987
- End date: 18 July 1989
- Legs: 7
- No. of shows: 198
- Box office: $135 million

Pink Floyd concert chronology
- The Wall Tour (1980–1981); A Momentary Lapse of Reason Tour (1987–1989); The Division Bell Tour (1994)

A Momentary Lapse of Reason and Another Lapse were two consecutive concert tours by the English rock band Pink Floyd. The A Momentary Lapse of Reason Tour ran from September 1987 to August 1988; while Another Lapse ran from May–July 1989. Both tours were in support of their album A Momentary Lapse of Reason (1987). The tour was the band's first since The Wall Tour in 1980–1981, and also the first without the band's original bassist Roger Waters. The band later reprised the setlist and stage show of this tour for their performance at Knebworth Park in 1990.

== History ==
Initially, there was a great deal of uncertainty around the tour. Pink Floyd had not played live since 1981, and had not embarked on a full-fledged tour since 1977. Roger Waters left the band in 1985, believing the band would not continue. However, Gilmour and Mason decided to continue as Pink Floyd. Waters threatened legal action against Gilmour and Mason, as well as any promoters who promoted shows as "Pink Floyd". However, by the end of 1987, with the success of the album and first stages of the tour, the new lineup had established itself commercially, and the band reached a settlement with Waters in December.

Having the success of The Wall Tour to live up to, the concerts' special effects were more impressive than ever. The initial "promotional tour" was extended, and finally lasted almost two years, ending in 1989 after playing around 197 concerts in total, including 3 dates at Madison Square Garden (5–7 October 1987) and 2 nights at Wembley Stadium (5–6 August 1988). The tour took Pink Floyd to various exotic locations they had never played before such as shows in the forecourt of the Palace of Versailles, Moscow's Olympic Stadium, and Venice, despite fears and protests that the sound would damage the latter city's foundations. The tour marked the first time that the band played in the Soviet Union, Norway, Spain and New Zealand, and was the first time they had played in Australia since 1971 and Japan since 1972.

Worldwide, the band grossed around US$135 million, making A Momentary Lapse of Reason the highest-grossing tour of the 1980s.

A further concert was held at the Knebworth Festival in 1990, a charity event that also featured other Silver Clef Award winners. Pink Floyd was the last act to play, to an audience of 120,000. During this gig Clare Torry joined Vicki and Sam Brown in providing backing vocals, Candy Dulfer contributing saxophone solos. The £60,000 firework display that ended the concert was entirely financed by the band. These shows are documented by the Delicate Sound of Thunder album, video and Live at Knebworth '90 video. Video of both the Venice and Knebworth concerts was released on Blu-Ray and DVD in The Later Years boxset.

== Personnel ==
Pink Floyd:

- David Gilmour – lead vocals, lead guitars and console steel guitar (on "One of These Days" and "The Great Gig in the Sky")
- Nick Mason – drums, percussion
- Richard Wright – keyboards, backing vocals and harmony vocals

Additional musicians:

- Jon Carin – keyboards, sound effects, vocals, additional percussion
- Scott Page – saxophones, oboe, additional guitars
- Guy Pratt – bass guitar, vocals
- Tim Renwick – guitars, backing vocals
- Gary Wallis – percussion, additional keyboards
- Rachel Fury – backing vocals
- Durga McBroom – backing vocals (from Omni shows in 1987 forward)
- Margaret Taylor (now known as Machan Taylor) – backing vocals (during the 1987-88 dates)
- Lorelei McBroom – backing vocals (at The Omni shows 1987 and the 1989 dates)
- Roberta Freeman – backing vocals (at The Omni shows 1987)

Knebworth Park additional musicians:

- Guy Pratt – bass guitar, vocals
- Jon Carin – keyboards, vocals
- Michael Kamen - keyboards
- Tim Renwick – rhythm and occasional lead guitars, backing vocals
- Gary Wallis – percussion
- Durga McBroom, Sam Brown, Vicki Brown, Clare Torry – backing vocals
- Candy Dulfer – saxophone

== Set list ==
=== Tour ===
The first set mainly consisted of songs from A Momentary Lapse of Reason and the second of hits and older songs. See notes on individual tour dates to see changes made to the usual set list.

9–11, 17–18 September 1987

First set

1. "Echoes" (from Meddle, 1971)
2. "Signs of Life" (from A Momentary Lapse of Reason, 1987)
3. "Learning to Fly" (from A Momentary Lapse of Reason, 1987)
4. "A New Machine, Part 1" (from A Momentary Lapse of Reason, 1987)
5. "Terminal Frost" (from A Momentary Lapse of Reason, 1987)
6. "A New Machine, Part 2" (from A Momentary Lapse of Reason, 1987)
7. "Sorrow" (from A Momentary Lapse of Reason, 1987)
8. "The Dogs of War" (from A Momentary Lapse of Reason, 1987)
9. "Yet Another Movie" (from A Momentary Lapse of Reason, 1987)
10. "Round and Around" (from A Momentary Lapse of Reason, 1987)
11. "On the Turning Away" (from A Momentary Lapse of Reason, 1987)

Second set

1. "One of These Days" (from Meddle, 1971)
2. "Time" (omitting the reprise of "Breathe") (from The Dark Side of the Moon, 1973)
3. "On the Run" (from The Dark Side of the Moon, 1973)
4. "Wish You Were Here" (from Wish You Were Here, 1975)
5. "Welcome to the Machine"(from Wish You Were Here, 1975)
6. "Us and Them" (from The Dark Side of the Moon, 1973)
7. "Money" (from The Dark Side of the Moon, 1973)
8. "Another Brick in the Wall, Part 2" (from The Wall, 1979)
9. "Comfortably Numb"(from The Wall, 1979)

Encore

1. "One Slip" (from A Momentary Lapse of Reason, 1987)
2. "Run Like Hell (from The Wall, 1979)
12–16 September 1987

First set

1. "Echoes" (from Meddle, 1971)
2. "Signs of Life" (from A Momentary Lapse of Reason, 1987)
3. "Learning to Fly" (from A Momentary Lapse of Reason, 1987)
4. "A New Machine, Part 1" (from A Momentary Lapse of Reason, 1987)
5. "Terminal Frost" (from A Momentary Lapse of Reason, 1987)
6. "A New Machine, Part 2" (from A Momentary Lapse of Reason, 1987)
7. "Sorrow" (from A Momentary Lapse of Reason, 1987)
8. "The Dogs of War" (from A Momentary Lapse of Reason, 1987)
9. "Yet Another Movie" (from A Momentary Lapse of Reason, 1987)
10. "Round and Around" (from A Momentary Lapse of Reason, 1987)
11. "On the Turning Away" (from A Momentary Lapse of Reason, 1987)

Second set

1. "One of These Days" (from Meddle, 1971)
2. "Time" (omitting the reprise of "Breathe") (from The Dark Side of the Moon, 1973)
3. "On the Run" (from The Dark Side of the Moon, 1973)
4. "Wish You Were Here" (from Wish You Were Here, 1975)
5. "Welcome to the Machine" (from Wish You Were Here, 1975)
6. "Us and Them" (from The Dark Side of the Moon, 1973)
7. "Money" (from The Dark Side of the Moon, 1973)
8. "Another Brick in the Wall, Part 2" (from The Wall, 1979)
9. "Comfortably Numb" (from The Wall, 1979)

Encore

1. "Run Like Hell" (from The Wall, 1979)

Second Encore

1. "Shine On You Crazy Diamond, Parts I–V" (from Wish You Were Here, 1975)
19 September 1987

First set

1. "Echoes" (from Meddle, 1971)
2. "Signs of Life" (from A Momentary Lapse of Reason, 1987)
3. "Learning to Fly" (from A Momentary Lapse of Reason, 1987)
4. "Yet Another Movie" (from A Momentary Lapse of Reason, 1987)
5. "Round and Around" (from A Momentary Lapse of Reason, 1987)
6. "A New Machine, Part 1" (from A Momentary Lapse of Reason, 1987)
7. "Terminal Frost" (from A Momentary Lapse of Reason, 1987)
8. "A New Machine, Part 2" (from A Momentary Lapse of Reason, 1987)
9. "Sorrow" (from A Momentary Lapse of Reason, 1987)
10. "The Dogs of War" (from A Momentary Lapse of Reason, 1987)
11. "On the Turning Away" (from A Momentary Lapse of Reason, 1987)

Second set

1. "One of These Days" (from Meddle, 1971)
2. "Time" (omitting the reprise of "Breathe") (from The Dark Side of the Moon, 1973)
3. "On the Run" (from The Dark Side of the Moon, 1973)
4. "Wish You Were Here" (from Wish You Were Here, 1975)
5. "Welcome to the Machine" (from Wish You Were Here, 1975)
6. "Us and Them" (from The Dark Side of the Moon, 1973)
7. "Money" (from The Dark Side of the Moon, 1973)
8. "Another Brick in the Wall, Part 2" (from The Wall, 1979)
9. "Comfortably Numb" (from The Wall, 1979)

Encore

1. "Run Like Hell" (from The Wall, 1979)
20–25 September 1987

First set

1. "Echoes" (from Meddle, 1971)
2. "Signs of Life" (from A Momentary Lapse of Reason, 1987)
3. "Learning to Fly" (from A Momentary Lapse of Reason, 1987)
4. "Yet Another Movie" (from A Momentary Lapse of Reason, 1987)
5. "Round and Around" (from A Momentary Lapse of Reason, 1987)
6. "A New Machine, Part 1" (from A Momentary Lapse of Reason, 1987)
7. "Terminal Frost" (from A Momentary Lapse of Reason, 1987)
8. "A New Machine, Part 2" (from A Momentary Lapse of Reason, 1987)
9. "Sorrow" (from A Momentary Lapse of Reason, 1987)
10. "The Dogs of War" (from A Momentary Lapse of Reason, 1987)
11. "On the Turning Away" (from A Momentary Lapse of Reason, 1987)

Second set

1. "One of These Days" (from Meddle, 1971)
2. "Time" (omitting the reprise of "Breathe") (from The Dark Side of the Moon, 1973)
3. "On the Run" (from The Dark Side of the Moon, 1973)
4. "Wish You Were Here" (from Wish You Were Here, 1975)
5. "Welcome to the Machine" (from Wish You Were Here, 1975)
6. "Us and Them" (from The Dark Side of the Moon, 1973)
7. "Money" (from The Dark Side of the Moon, 1973)
8. "Another Brick in the Wall, Part 2" (from The Wall, 1979)
9. "Comfortably Numb" (from The Wall, 1979)

Encore

1. "One Slip" (from A Momentary Lapse of Reason, 1987)
2. "Run Like Hell" (from The Wall, 1979)
26 September 1987–1 March 1988

First set

1. "Shine On You Crazy Diamond, Parts I–V" (from Wish You Were Here, 1975)
2. "Signs of Life" (from A Momentary Lapse of Reason, 1987)
3. "Learning to Fly" (from A Momentary Lapse of Reason, 1987)
4. "Yet Another Movie" (from A Momentary Lapse of Reason, 1987)
5. "Round and Around" (from A Momentary Lapse of Reason, 1987)
6. "A New Machine, Part 1" (from A Momentary Lapse of Reason, 1987)
7. "Terminal Frost" (from A Momentary Lapse of Reason, 1987)
8. "A New Machine, Part 2" (from A Momentary Lapse of Reason, 1987)
9. "Sorrow" (from A Momentary Lapse of Reason, 1987)
10. "The Dogs of War" (from A Momentary Lapse of Reason, 1987)
11. "On the Turning Away" (from A Momentary Lapse of Reason, 1987)

Second set

1. "One of These Days" (from Meddle, 1971)
2. "Time" (omitting the reprise of "Breathe") (from The Dark Side of the Moon, 1973)
3. "On the Run" (from The Dark Side of the Moon, 1973)
4. "Wish You Were Here" (from Wish You Were Here, 1975)
5. "Welcome to the Machine" (from Wish You Were Here, 1975)
6. "Us and Them" (from The Dark Side of the Moon, 1973)
7. "Money" (from The Dark Side of the Moon, 1973)
8. "Another Brick in the Wall, Part 2" (from The Wall, 1979)
9. "Comfortably Numb" (from The Wall, 1979)

Encore

1. "One Slip" (from A Momentary Lapse of Reason, 1987)
2. "Run Like Hell" (from The Wall, 1979)
2 March 1988

First set

1. "Shine On You Crazy Diamond, Parts I–V" (from Wish You Were Here, 1975)
2. "Signs of Life" (from A Momentary Lapse of Reason, 1987)
3. "Learning to Fly" (from A Momentary Lapse of Reason, 1987)
4. "Yet Another Movie" (from A Momentary Lapse of Reason, 1987)
5. "Round and Around" (from A Momentary Lapse of Reason, 1987)
6. "A New Machine, Part 1" (from A Momentary Lapse of Reason, 1987)
7. "Terminal Frost" (from A Momentary Lapse of Reason, 1987)
8. "A New Machine, Part 2" (from A Momentary Lapse of Reason, 1987)
9. "Sorrow" (from A Momentary Lapse of Reason, 1987)
10. "The Dogs of War" (from A Momentary Lapse of Reason, 1987)
11. "On the Turning Away" (from A Momentary Lapse of Reason, 1987)

Second set

1. "One of These Days" (from Meddle, 1971)
2. "Time" (omitting the reprise of "Breathe") (from The Dark Side of the Moon, 1973)
3. "The Great Gig in the Sky" (from The Dark Side of the Moon, 1973)
4. "Wish You Were Here" (from The Dark Side of the Moon, 1973)
5. "Welcome to the Machine" (from Wish You Were Here, 1975)
6. "Us and Them" (from The Dark Side of the Moon, 1973)
7. "Money" (from The Dark Side of the Moon, 1973)
8. "Another Brick in the Wall, Part 2" (from The Wall, 1979)
9. "Comfortably Numb" (from The Wall, 1979)

Encore

1. "One Slip" (from A Momentary Lapse of Reason, 1987)
2. "Run Like Hell" (from The Wall, 1979)
3–11 March 1988

First set

1. "Shine On You Crazy Diamond, Parts I–V" (from Wish You Were Here, 1975)
2. "Signs of Life" (from A Momentary Lapse of Reason, 1987)
3. "Learning to Fly" (from A Momentary Lapse of Reason, 1987)
4. "Yet Another Movie" (from A Momentary Lapse of Reason, 1987)
5. "Round and Around" (from A Momentary Lapse of Reason, 1987)
6. "A New Machine, Part 1" (from A Momentary Lapse of Reason, 1987)
7. "Terminal Frost" (from A Momentary Lapse of Reason, 1987)
8. "A New Machine, Part 2" (from A Momentary Lapse of Reason, 1987)
9. "Sorrow" (from A Momentary Lapse of Reason, 1987)
10. "The Dogs of War" (from A Momentary Lapse of Reason, 1987)
11. "On the Turning Away" (from A Momentary Lapse of Reason, 1987)

Second set

1. "One of These Days" (from Meddle, 1971)
2. "Time" (omitting the reprise of "Breathe") (from The Dark Side of the Moon, 1973)
3. "The Great Gig in the Sky" (from The Dark Side of the Moon, 1973)
4. "Wish You Were Here" (from Wish You Were Here, 1975)
5. "Welcome to the Machine" (from Wish You Were Here, 1975)
6. "Us and Them" (from The Dark Side of the Moon, 1973)
7. "Money" (from The Dark Side of the Moon, 1973)
8. "Another Brick in the Wall, Part 2" (from The Wall, 1979)
9. "Comfortably Numb" (from The Wall, 1979)

Encore

1. "One Slip" (from A Momentary Lapse of Reason, 1987)
2. "Run Like Hell" (from The Wall, 1979)
12 March–29 April, 1 May–12 June, 15–30 June, 2, 4 July–1, 3–4, 7, 9 August 1988

First set

1. "Shine On You Crazy Diamond, Parts I–V" (from Wish You Were Here, 1975)
2. "Signs of Life" (from A Momentary Lapse of Reason, 1987)
3. "Learning to Fly" (from A Momentary Lapse of Reason, 1987)
4. "Yet Another Movie" (from A Momentary Lapse of Reason, 1987)
5. "Round and Around" (from A Momentary Lapse of Reason, 1987)
6. "A New Machine, Part 1" (from A Momentary Lapse of Reason, 1987)
7. "Terminal Frost" (from A Momentary Lapse of Reason, 1987)
8. "A New Machine, Part 2" (from A Momentary Lapse of Reason, 1987)
9. "Sorrow" (from A Momentary Lapse of Reason, 1987)
10. "The Dogs of War" (from A Momentary Lapse of Reason, 1987)
11. "On the Turning Away" (from A Momentary Lapse of Reason, 1987)

Second set

1. "One of These Days" (from Meddle, 1971)
2. "Time" (omitting the reprise of "Breathe") (from The Dark Side of the Moon, 1973)
3. "On the Run" (from The Dark Side of the Moon, 1973)
4. "The Great Gig in the Sky" (from The Dark Side of the Moon, 1973)
5. "Wish You Were Here" (from Wish You Were Here, 1975)
6. "Welcome to the Machine" (from Wish You Were Here, 1975)
7. "Us and Them" (from The Dark Side of the Moon, 1973)
8. "Money" (from The Dark Side of the Moon, 1973)
9. "Another Brick in the Wall, Part 2" (from The Wall, 1979)
10. "Comfortably Numb" (from The Wall, 1979)

Encore

1. "One Slip" (from A Momentary Lapse of Reason, 1987)
2. "Run Like Hell" (from The Wall, 1979)
30 April 1988

First set

1. "Signs of Life" (from A Momentary Lapse of Reason, 1987)
2. "Learning to Fly" (from A Momentary Lapse of Reason, 1987)
3. "Yet Another Movie" (from A Momentary Lapse of Reason, 1987)
4. "Round and Around" (from A Momentary Lapse of Reason, 1987)
5. "A New Machine, Part 1" (from A Momentary Lapse of Reason, 1987)
6. "Terminal Frost" (from A Momentary Lapse of Reason, 1987)
7. "A New Machine, Part 2" (from A Momentary Lapse of Reason, 1987)
8. "Sorrow" (from A Momentary Lapse of Reason, 1987)
9. "The Dogs of War" (from A Momentary Lapse of Reason, 1987)
10. "On the Turning Away" (from A Momentary Lapse of Reason, 1987)

Second set

1. "One of These Days" (from Meddle, 1971)
2. "Time" (omitting the reprise of "Breathe") (from The Dark Side of the Moon, 1973)
3. "On the Run" (from The Dark Side of the Moon, 1973)
4. "The Great Gig in the Sky" (from The Dark Side of the Moon, 1973)
5. "Wish You Were Here" (from Wish You Were Here, 1975)
6. "Us and Them" (from The Dark Side of the Moon, 1973)
7. "Money" (from The Dark Side of the Moon, 1973)
8. "Another Brick in the Wall, Part 2" (from The Wall, 1979)
9. "Comfortably Numb" (from The Wall, 1979)

Encore

1. "One Slip" (from A Momentary Lapse of Reason, 1987)
2. "Run Like Hell" (from The Wall, 1979)
13–14 June, 1, 3 July, 2, 5–6, 8 August 1988

First set

1. "Shine On You Crazy Diamond, Parts I–V" (from Wish You Were Here, 1975)
2. "Signs of Life" (from A Momentary Lapse of Reason, 1987)
3. "Learning to Fly" (from A Momentary Lapse of Reason, 1987)
4. "Yet Another Movie" (from A Momentary Lapse of Reason, 1987)
5. "Round and Around" (from A Momentary Lapse of Reason, 1987)
6. "Sorrow" (from A Momentary Lapse of Reason, 1987)
7. "The Dogs of War" (from A Momentary Lapse of Reason, 1987)
8. "On the Turning Away" (from A Momentary Lapse of Reason, 1987)

Second set

1. "One of These Days" (from Meddle, 1971)
2. "Time" (omitting the reprise of "Breathe") (from The Dark Side of the Moon, 1973)
3. "On the Run" (from The Dark Side of the Moon, 1973)
4. "The Great Gig in the Sky" (from The Dark Side of the Moon, 1973)
5. "Wish You Were Here" (from Wish You Were Here, 1975)
6. "Welcome to the Machine" (from Wish You Were Here, 1975)
7. "Us and Them" (from The Dark Side of the Moon, 1973)
8. "Money" (from The Dark Side of the Moon, 1973)
9. "Another Brick in the Wall, Part 2" (from The Wall, 1979)
10. "Comfortably Numb" (from The Wall, 1979)

Encore

1. "One Slip" (from A Momentary Lapse of Reason, 1987)
2. "Run Like Hell" (from The Wall, 1979)

=== Grand Canal, Venice, 15 July 1989 – Live TV concert ===
This was a special performance on a floating platform, for live Italian TV and was also broadcast worldwide. Due to time restrictions of live TV some songs were left out and others shortened in places. Before the concert, city authorities were so worried about the effects of loud amplified music on the ancient structures of the city that Pink Floyd agreed to play more quietly than usual. The influx of 200,000 fans into the city, and the outcry arising from the mountains of litter left behind and the inevitable consequences of the lack of toilet facilities, led to the entire city council resigning after the concert.

'The Venice show was great fun, but it was very tense and nerve-wracking. We had a specific length of show to do; the satellite broadcasting meant we had to get it absolutely precise. We had the list of songs, and we'd shortened them, which we'd never done before. I had a big clock with a red digital read-out on the floor in front of me, and had the start time of each number on a piece of paper. If we were coming near the start time of the next number, I just had to wrap up the one we were on. We had a really good time, but the city authorities who had agreed to provide the services of security, toilets, food, completely reneged on everything they were supposed to do, and then tried to blame all the subsequent problems on us.'

— David Gilmour,

1. "Shine On You Crazy Diamond, Part I" (intro only)
2. "Learning to Fly"
3. "Yet Another Movie"
4. "Round and Around"
5. "Sorrow" (shortened outro)
6. "The Dogs of War"
7. "On the Turning Away"
8. "Time"
9. "The Great Gig in the Sky"
10. "Wish You Were Here"
11. "Money" (shorter than had previously been performed on the tour)
12. "Another Brick in the Wall, Part 2"
13. "Comfortably Numb"
14. "Run Like Hell"

=== Knebworth Park, Knebworth, 30 June 1990 – Silver Clef Award Winners Concert ===
1. "Shine On You Crazy Diamond, Parts I-V" (featuring Candy Dulfer)
2. "The Great Gig in the Sky" (featuring Clare Torry)
3. "Wish You Were Here"
4. "Sorrow"
5. "Money" (featuring Candy Dulfer)
6. "Comfortably Numb" (featuring Michael Kamen)
7. "Run Like Hell"

== Tour dates ==
List of 1987 concerts
Date	City	Country	Venue	Tickets sold / available	Revenue
9 September 1987 (Note: First performance of "Echoes" since 1975. The set also had "Yet Another Movie/Round and Around" played after "The Dogs of War".)	Ottawa	Canada	Lansdowne Park	26,062 / 35,000	$495,099
12 September 1987 (Note: "Shine On You Crazy Diamond (Parts 1-5)" performed for the first time since 1977, played as a second encore.)	Montreal	Canada	Montreal Forum	42,912 / 42,912	N/A
13 September 1987 (Note: "Shine On You Crazy Diamond (Parts 1-5)" played as a second encore.)	Montreal	Canada	Montreal Forum	42,912 / 42,912	N/A
14 September 1987	Montreal	Canada	Montreal Forum	42,912 / 42,912	N/A
16 September 1987	Cleveland	United States	Cleveland Stadium	128,364 / 128,364	$2,567,280
17 September 1987	Cleveland	United States	Cleveland Stadium	128,364 / 128,364	$2,567,280
19 September 1987 (Note: "Yet Another Movie/Round and Around" moved, placed after "Learning to Fly". "One Slip" was not performed and was replaced by "Shine On You Crazy Diamond" which was played after "Run Like Hell".)	Philadelphia	United States	John F. Kennedy Stadium	80,754 / 80,754	$1,615,080
21 September 1987	Toronto	Canada	Exhibition Stadium	146,599 / 150,000	$2,825,860
22 September 1987	Toronto	Canada	Exhibition Stadium	146,599 / 150,000	$2,825,860
23 September 1987	Toronto	Canada	Exhibition Stadium	146,599 / 150,000	$2,825,860
25 September 1987	Rosemont	United States	Rosemont Horizon	54,400 / 54,400	N/A
26 September 1987 (Note: "Echoes" dropped permanently and is replaced by "Shine On You Crazy Diamond (Parts 1-5)" as the show opener.)	Rosemont	United States	Rosemont Horizon	54,400 / 54,400	N/A
27 September 1987	Rosemont	United States	Rosemont Horizon	54,400 / 54,400	N/A
28 September 1987	Rosemont	United States	Rosemont Horizon	54,400 / 54,400	N/A
30 September 1987	Milwaukee	United States	County Stadium	58,044 / 60,000	$1,160,880
3 October 1987	Syracuse	United States	Carrier Dome	39,510 / 39,510	N/A
5 October 1987	New York City	United States	Madison Square Garden	50,571 / 50,571	$1,100,500
6 October 1987	New York City	United States	Madison Square Garden	50,571 / 50,571	$1,100,500
7 October 1987	New York City	United States	Madison Square Garden	50,571 / 50,571	$1,100,500
10 October 1987	East Rutherford	United States	Brendan Byrne Arena	51,923 / 51,923	$1,049,449
11 October 1987	East Rutherford	United States	Brendan Byrne Arena	51,923 / 51,923	$1,049,449
12 October 1987	East Rutherford	United States	Brendan Byrne Arena	51,923 / 51,923	$1,049,449
14 October 1987	Hartford	United States	Hartford Civic Center	N/A	N/A
15 October 1987	Hartford	United States	Hartford Civic Center	N/A	N/A
16 October 1987	Providence	United States	Providence Civic Center	23,860 / 23,860	$536,850
17 October 1987	Providence	United States	Providence Civic Center	23,860 / 23,860	$536,850
19 October 1987	Landover	United States	Capital Centre	54,505 / 58,000	$1,304,200
20 October 1987	Landover	United States	Capital Centre	54,505 / 58,000	$1,304,200
21 October 1987	Landover	United States	Capital Centre	54,505 / 58,000	$1,304,200
22 October 1987	Landover	United States	Capital Centre	54,505 / 58,000	$1,304,200
25 October 1987	Chapel Hill	United States	Dean Smith Center	28,636 / 29,604	$529,766
26 October 1987	Chapel Hill	United States	Dean Smith Center	28,636 / 29,604	$529,766
30 October 1987	Tampa	United States	Tampa Stadium	55,107 / 55,107	N/A
1 November 1987	Miami	United States	Orange Bowl	55,000 / 55,000	N/A
3 November 1987	Atlanta	United States	Omni Coliseum	41,129 / 41,429	$822,823
4 November 1987	Atlanta	United States	Omni Coliseum	41,129 / 41,429	$822,823
5 November 1987	Atlanta	United States	Omni Coliseum	41,129 / 41,429	$822,823
7 November 1987	Lexington	United States	Rupp Arena	31,175 / 31,175	$576,138
8 November 1987	Lexington	United States	Rupp Arena	31,175 / 31,175	$576,138
10 November 1987	Pontiac	United States	Pontiac Silverdome	46,192 / 46,192	$923,840
12 November 1987	Indianapolis	United States	Hoosier Dome	41,782 / 41,782	$835,640
15 November 1987	St. Louis	United States	St. Louis Arena	27,954 / 27,954	$548,460
16 November 1987	St. Louis	United States	St. Louis Arena	27,954 / 27,954	$548,460
18 November 1987	Houston	United States	Astrodome	37,956 / 37,956	$734,760
19 November 1987	Austin	United States	Frank Erwin Center	26,966 / 26,966	$489,675
20 November 1987	Austin	United States	Frank Erwin Center	26,966 / 26,966	$489,675
21 November 1987	Dallas	United States	Reunion Arena	46,179 / 46,179	$895,543
22 November 1987	Dallas	United States	Reunion Arena	46,179 / 46,179	$895,543
23 November 1987	Dallas	United States	Reunion Arena	46,179 / 46,179	$895,543
26 November 1987	Los Angeles	United States	Los Angeles Memorial Sports Arena	N/A	N/A
27 November 1987	Los Angeles	United States	Los Angeles Memorial Sports Arena	N/A	N/A
28 November 1987	Los Angeles	United States	Los Angeles Memorial Sports Arena	N/A	N/A
30 November 1987	Los Angeles	United States	Los Angeles Memorial Sports Arena	N/A	N/A
1 December 1987	Los Angeles	United States	Los Angeles Memorial Sports Arena	N/A	N/A
3 December 1987	Oakland	United States	Oakland–Alameda County Coliseum Arena	53,013 / 53,013	$1,192,793
4 December 1987	Oakland	United States	Oakland–Alameda County Coliseum Arena	53,013 / 53,013	$1,192,793
5 December 1987	Oakland	United States	Oakland–Alameda County Coliseum Arena	53,013 / 53,013	$1,192,793
6 December 1987	Oakland	United States	Oakland–Alameda County Coliseum Arena	53,013 / 53,013	$1,192,793
8 December 1987	Seattle	United States	Kingdome	33,700 / 40,000	$710,382
10 December 1987	Vancouver	Canada	BC Place	45,538 / 45,538	$879,825

List of 1988 concerts
Date	City	Country	Venue	Tickets sold / available	Revenue
22 January 1988	Auckland	New Zealand	Western Springs Stadium	N/A	N/A
27 January 1988	Sydney	Australia	Sydney Entertainment Centre	N/A	N/A
28 January 1988	Sydney	Australia	Sydney Entertainment Centre	N/A	N/A
29 January 1988	Sydney	Australia	Sydney Entertainment Centre	N/A	N/A
30 January 1988	Sydney	Australia	Sydney Entertainment Centre	N/A	N/A
31 January 1988	Sydney	Australia	Sydney Entertainment Centre	N/A	N/A
1 February 1988	Sydney	Australia	Sydney Entertainment Centre	N/A	N/A
2 February 1988	Sydney	Australia	Sydney Entertainment Centre	N/A	N/A
3 February 1988	Sydney	Australia	Sydney Entertainment Centre	N/A	N/A
4 February 1988	Sydney	Australia	Sydney Entertainment Centre	N/A	N/A
5 February 1988	Sydney	Australia	Sydney Entertainment Centre	N/A	N/A
7 February 1988	Brisbane	Australia	Brisbane Entertainment Centre	N/A	N/A
8 February 1988	Brisbane	Australia	Brisbane Entertainment Centre	N/A	N/A
11 February 1988	Adelaide	Australia	Thebarton Oval	N/A	N/A
13 February 1988	Melbourne	Australia	Melbourne & Olympic Parks	N/A	N/A
14 February 1988	Melbourne	Australia	Melbourne & Olympic Parks	N/A	N/A
15 February 1988	Melbourne	Australia	Melbourne & Olympic Parks	N/A	N/A
16 February 1988	Melbourne	Australia	Melbourne & Olympic Parks	N/A	N/A
17 February 1988	Melbourne	Australia	Melbourne & Olympic Parks	N/A	N/A
18 February 1988	Melbourne	Australia	Melbourne & Olympic Parks	N/A	N/A
19 February 1988	Melbourne	Australia	Melbourne & Olympic Parks	N/A	N/A
20 February 1988	Melbourne	Australia	Melbourne & Olympic Parks	N/A	N/A
24 February 1988	Perth	Australia	East Fremantle Oval	N/A	N/A
2 March 1988 (Note: "On the Run" replaced by "The Great Gig in the Sky".)	Tokyo	Japan	Nippon Budokan	N/A	N/A
3 March 1988	Tokyo	Japan	Nippon Budokan	N/A	N/A
4 March 1988	Tokyo	Japan	Yoyogi National Gymnasium	N/A	N/A
5 March 1988	Tokyo	Japan	Yoyogi National Gymnasium	N/A	N/A
6 March 1988	Tokyo	Japan	Yoyogi National Gymnasium	N/A	N/A
8 March 1988	Osaka	Japan	Osaka-jo Hall	N/A	N/A
9 March 1988	Osaka	Japan	Osaka-jo Hall	N/A	N/A
11 March 1988	Nagoya	Japan	Rainbow Hall	N/A	N/A
15 April 1988 (Note: "On the Run" restored to the set. "The Great Gig in the Sky" played after "On the Run" from now on.)	Los Angeles	United States	Los Angeles Memorial Coliseum	56,672 / 64,019	$1,233,203
18 April 1988	Denver	United States	Mile High Stadium	51,976 / 65,000	$1,143,472
20 April 1988	Sacramento	United States	Charles C. Hughes Stadium	27,000 / 27,000	$607,960
22 April 1988	Oakland	United States	Oakland–Alameda County Coliseum	78,972 / 90,000	$1,716,870
23 April 1988	Oakland	United States	Oakland–Alameda County Coliseum	78,972 / 90,000	$1,716,870
25 April 1988	Phoenix	United States	Municipal Stadium	48,330 / 48,330	$1,070,402
26 April 1988	Phoenix	United States	Municipal Stadium	48,330 / 48,330	$1,070,402
28 April 1988	Irving	United States	Texas Stadium	47,137 / 47,137	$924,080
30 April 1988 (Note: "Shine On You Crazy Diamond" and "Welcome to the Machine" not performed.)	Orlando	United States	Florida Citrus Bowl	N/A	N/A
4 May 1988	Raleigh	United States	Carter–Finley Stadium	42,982 / 42,982	$866,576
6 May 1988	Foxborough	United States	Sullivan Stadium	85,911 / 88,998	$1,932,998
8 May 1988	Foxborough	United States	Sullivan Stadium	85,911 / 88,998	$1,932,998
11 May 1988	Montreal	Canada	Olympic Stadium	41,761 / 55,000	$1,168,236
13 May 1988	Toronto	Canada	CNE Stadium	47,017 / 50,000	$1,014,204
15 May 1988	Philadelphia	United States	Veterans Stadium	88,010 / 95,800	$1,917,675
16 May 1988	Philadelphia	United States	Veterans Stadium	88,010 / 95,800	$1,917,675
18 May 1988	Cedar Falls	United States	UNI-Dome	15,857 / 15,857	N/A
20 May 1988	Madison	United States	Camp Randall Stadium	45,132 / 55,000	$902,640
21 May 1988	Rosemont	United States	Rosemont Horizon	28,788 / 28,788	$704,725
22 May 1988	Rosemont	United States	Rosemont Horizon	28,788 / 28,788	$704,725
24 May 1988	Minneapolis	United States	Hubert H. Humphrey Metrodome	42,532 / 50,000	$938,768
26 May 1988	Kansas City	United States	Arrowhead Stadium	N/A	N/A
28 May 1988	Columbus	United States	Ohio Stadium	63,016 / 63,016	$1,260,320
30 May 1988 (Note: "Sorrow" cut short by power outage. The band resumed with "The Dogs of War" after approx. 15 minutes.)	Pittsburgh	United States	Three Rivers Stadium	51,101 / 51,101	$1,022,020
1 June 1988	Washington, D.C.	United States	RFK Stadium	44,586 / 44,586	$1,003,185
3 June 1988	East Rutherford	United States	Giants Stadium	107,568 / 107,568	$2,389,635
4 June 1988	East Rutherford	United States	Giants Stadium	107,568 / 107,568	$2,389,635
10 June 1988	Nantes	France	Stade de la Beaujoire	N/A	N/A
13 June 1988 (Note: "A New Machine (Part 1)", "Terminal Frost", and "A New Machine (Part 2)" not performed.)	Rotterdam	Netherlands	Feijenoord Stadion	N/A	N/A
14 June 1988	Rotterdam	Netherlands	Feijenoord Stadion	N/A	N/A
16 June 1988	West Berlin	West Germany	Reichstagsgelände	N/A	N/A
18 June 1988	Mannheim	West Germany	Maimarktgelände	N/A	N/A
21 June 1988	Versailles	France	Palace of Versailles	N/A	N/A
22 June 1988	Versailles	France	Palace of Versailles	N/A	N/A
25 June 1988	Hanover	West Germany	Niedersachsenstadion	N/A	N/A
27 June 1988	Dortmund	West Germany	Westfalenhallen	N/A	N/A
28 June 1988	Dortmund	West Germany	Westfalenhallen	N/A	N/A
29 June 1988	Dortmund	West Germany	Westfalenhallen	N/A	N/A
1 July 1988	Vienna	Austria	Ernst-Happel-Stadion	N/A	N/A
3 July 1988	Munich	West Germany	Olympiastadion München	N/A	N/A
6 July 1988	Turin	Italy	Stadio Olimpico di Torino	N/A	N/A
8 July 1988	Modena	Italy	Stadio Alberto Braglia	N/A	N/A
9 July 1988	Modena	Italy	Stadio Alberto Braglia	N/A	N/A
11 July 1988	Rome	Italy	Stadio Flaminio	N/A	N/A
12 July 1988	Rome	Italy	Stadio Flaminio	N/A	N/A
15 July 1988	Grenoble	France	Stade du Municipal Charles-Berty	N/A	N/A
17 July 1988	Nice	France	Stade Charles-Ehrmann	N/A	N/A
20 July 1988	Barcelona	Spain	Estadi de Sarrià	N/A	N/A
22 July 1988	Madrid	Spain	Estadio Vicente Calderón	N/A	N/A
24 July 1988	Montpellier	France	Espace Richter	N/A	N/A
26 July 1988	Basel	Switzerland	St. Jakob Stadium	N/A	N/A
28 July 1988	Lille	France	Stadium Nord Lille Métropole	N/A	N/A
31 July 1988	Copenhagen	Denmark	Gentofte Stadion	N/A	N/A
2 August 1988	Oslo	Norway	Valle Hovin	N/A	N/A
5 August 1988	London	England	Wembley Stadium	N/A	N/A
6 August 1988	London	England	Wembley Stadium	N/A	N/A
8 August 1988	Manchester	England	Maine Road	N/A	N/A
12 August 1988	Richfield	United States	Richfield Coliseum	44,640 / 44,640	$1,116,000
13 August 1988	Richfield	United States	Richfield Coliseum	44,640 / 44,640	$1,116,000
14 August 1988	Richfield	United States	Richfield Coliseum	44,640 / 44,640	$1,116,000
16 August 1988	Auburn Hills	United States	The Palace of Auburn Hills	31,016 / 31,016	$775,400
17 August 1988	Auburn Hills	United States	The Palace of Auburn Hills	31,016 / 31,016	$775,400
19 August 1988 (Note: Recorded for the Delicate Sound of Thunder album and film.)	Uniondale	United States	Nassau Coliseum	71,862 / 71,862	$1,796,550
20 August 1988	Uniondale	United States	Nassau Coliseum	71,862 / 71,862	$1,796,550
21 August 1988	Uniondale	United States	Nassau Coliseum	71,862 / 71,862	$1,796,550
22 August 1988	Uniondale	United States	Nassau Coliseum	71,862 / 71,862	$1,796,550
23 August 1988	Uniondale	United States	Nassau Coliseum	71,862 / 71,862	$1,796,550

List of 1989 concerts
Date	City	Country	Venue	Tickets sold / available	Revenue
13 May 1989	Werchter	Belgium	Werchter festival ground	N/A	N/A
16 May 1989	Verona	Italy	Verona Arena	N/A	N/A
17 May 1989	Verona	Italy	Verona Arena	N/A	N/A
18 May 1989	Verona	Italy	Verona Arena	N/A	N/A
20 May 1989	Monza	Italy	Autodromo Nazionale Monza	N/A	N/A
22 May 1989	Livorno	Italy	Stadio Armando Picchi	N/A	N/A
23 May 1989	Livorno	Italy	Stadio Armando Picchi	N/A	N/A
25 May 1989	Cava de' Tirreni	Italy	Stadio Simonetta Lamberti	N/A	N/A
26 May 1989	Cava de' Tirreni	Italy	Stadio Simonetta Lamberti	N/A	N/A
31 May 1989	Athens	Greece	Olympic Stadium	N/A	N/A
3 June 1989	Moscow	Soviet Union	Olympic Stadium	N/A	N/A
4 June 1989	Moscow	Soviet Union	Olympic Stadium	N/A	N/A
6 June 1989	Moscow	Soviet Union	Olympic Stadium	N/A	N/A
7 June 1989	Moscow	Soviet Union	Olympic Stadium	N/A	N/A
8 June 1989	Moscow	Soviet Union	Olympic Stadium	N/A	N/A
10 June 1989	Lahti	Finland	Lahden Suurhalli	N/A	N/A
12 June 1989	Stockholm	Sweden	Stockholm Globe Arena	N/A	N/A
13 June 1989	Stockholm	Sweden	Stockholm Globe Arena	N/A	N/A
14 June 1989	Stockholm	Sweden	Stockholm Globe Arena	N/A	N/A
16 June 1989	Hamburg	West Germany	Festwiese Im Stadtpark	N/A	N/A
18 June 1989	Cologne	West Germany	Mungersdorfer Stadion	N/A	N/A
20 June 1989	Frankfurt	West Germany	Festhalle Frankfurt	N/A	N/A
21 June 1989	Frankfurt	West Germany	Festhalle Frankfurt	N/A	N/A
23 June 1989	Linz	Austria	Linzer Stadion	N/A	N/A
25 June 1989	Stuttgart	West Germany	Neckarstadion	N/A	N/A
27 June 1989	Paris	France	Palais Omnisports de Paris-Bercy	N/A	N/A
28 June 1989	Paris	France	Palais Omnisports de Paris-Bercy	N/A	N/A
29 June 1989	Paris	France	Palais Omnisports de Paris-Bercy	N/A	N/A
30 June 1989	Paris	France	Palais Omnisports de Paris-Bercy	N/A	N/A
1 July 1989	Paris	France	Palais Omnisports de Paris-Bercy	N/A	N/A
4 July 1989	London	England	Docklands Arena	N/A	N/A
5 July 1989	London	England	Docklands Arena	N/A	N/A
6 July 1989	London	England	Docklands Arena	N/A	N/A
7 July 1989	London	England	Docklands Arena	N/A	N/A
8 July 1989	London	England	Docklands Arena	N/A	N/A
9 July 1989	London	England	Docklands Arena	N/A	N/A
10 July 1989	Nijmegen	Netherlands	Goffertpark	N/A	N/A
12 July 1989	Lausanne	Switzerland	Stade Olympique de la Pontaise	N/A	N/A
15 July 1989 (Note: Shorter set, see below.)	Venice	Italy	Piazza San Marco	N/A	N/A
18 July 1989	Marseille	France	Stade Vélodrome	N/A	N/A

== See also ==
- List of highest-grossing concert tours
- List of most-attended concert tours
