= Us and Them: Symphonic Pink Floyd =

1995 instrumental album of Pink Floyd songs

Studio album arranged by Jaz Coleman and performed by the London Philharmonic Orchestra
- Released: October 10, 1995
- Genre: Classical music
- Length: 72:08
- Label: Philips
- Producer: Martin Glover

Professional ratings
Review scores
Source	Rating
AllMusic	2.5/5 stars

Us and Them: Symphonic Pink Floyd is an instrumental album of Pink Floyd songs. The album was arranged by Jaz Coleman, produced by Youth and performed by the London Philharmonic Orchestra conducted by Peter Scholes.

The album cover was painted by Roger Dean who is known for his organic paintings. He also designed albums for Asia, Uriah Heep, and Yes.

The album, which features six songs taken from The Dark Side of the Moon released in 1973 and three from The Wall released in 1979, peaked at number one in the Billboard Magazine Top Classical Crossover Albums chart.

== Track listing ==
No.	Title	Writer(s)	Album	Length
1.	"Time"	David Gilmour, Nick Mason, Roger Waters, Richard Wright	The Dark Side of the Moon	8:13
2.	"Brain Damage"	Waters	The Dark Side of the Moon	5:14
3.	"Another Brick in the Wall (Part II)"	Waters	The Wall	8:28
4.	"Comfortably Numb"	Gilmour, Waters	The Wall	5:27
5.	"Breathe"	Gilmour, Waters, Wright	The Dark Side of the Moon	4:04
6.	"Money"	Waters	The Dark Side of the Moon	6:46
7.	"The Great Gig in the Sky"	Wright, Clare Torry	The Dark Side of the Moon	5:11
8.	"Nobody Home"	Waters	The Wall	6:26
9.	"Us and Them"	Wright, Waters	The Dark Side of the Moon	11:38
10.	"Time" (The Old Tree with Winding Roots Behind the Lake of Dreams Mix)	Gilmour, Waters, Wright, Mason	New mix; previously unreleased	10:43

== Charts ==
Chart (1995)	Peak position
US Classical Crossover Albums (Billboard)	1
