= The Dark Side of the Moon Redux =

2023 studio album by Roger Waters

Studio album (re-recording) by Roger Waters
- Released: 6 October 2023
- Studios: Sargent Recorders, Mantis Studios, EastWest Studios, Strongroom, Fivestarstudios
- Genres: Art rock; spoken word
- Length: 47:51
- Labels: SGB; Cooking Vinyl
- Producers: Gus Seyffert; Roger Waters

Roger Waters chronology
The Lockdown Sessions (2022)	The Dark Side of the Moon Redux (2023)	The Dark Side of the Moon Redux Live (2025)

Singles from The Dark Side of the Moon Redux
- 1. "Money" Released: 21 July 2023; 2. "Time" Released: 24 August 2023; 3. "Speak to Me" / "Breathe" Released: 21 September 2023

The Dark Side of the Moon Redux is the seventh studio album by the English musician Roger Waters, released on 6 October 2023. Produced by Gus Seyffert and Waters, Redux is a new version of The Dark Side of the Moon (1973) by Waters' former band, Pink Floyd, released for its 50th anniversary. It received mixed reviews; some critics praised the artistic exercise and renewed focus on lyrics, while others criticised its slow pace or saw it as indulgent.

== Background ==
Waters co-founded the rock band Pink Floyd in 1965. Their 1973 album The Dark Side of the Moon, with lyrics by Waters, spent 736 consecutive weeks on the Billboard 200 chart and sold more than 40 million copies worldwide. In 1985, Waters left Pink Floyd and began a solo career.

In 2022, Waters released The Lockdown Sessions, comprising stripped-back rerecordings of several of his solo tracks and tracks with Pink Floyd. During the recording, it occurred to him that he could make a similar rerecording of The Dark Side of the Moon for its 50th anniversary. In a press release, Waters wrote: "[We] were so young when we made [the original], and when you look at the world around us, clearly the message hasn't stuck. That's why I started to consider what the wisdom of an 80-year-old could bring to a reimagined version."

== Content ==
The Dark Side of the Moon Redux features no other members of Pink Floyd, and was recorded with musicians including Gus Seyffert, Joey Waronker, Jonathan Wilson, Jon Carin, Johnny Shepherd, Azniv Korkejian (Bedouine), Via Mardot, Gabe Noel, and Robert Walter. It features spoken-word sections and no guitar solos, to "bring out the heart and soul of the album musically and spiritually". The new version of "Speak to Me" includes Waters' recitation of his lyrics from the 1972 Pink Floyd track "Free Four".

Waters intended Redux as a tribute to the original album rather than a replacement, and a way to readdress its political statements. He said: "The new recording is more reflective I think, and it's more indicative of what the concept of the record was." The Pink Floyd drummer, Nick Mason, said Redux was "absolutely brilliant ... It's not anything that would be a spoiler for the original at all, it's an interesting add-on to the thing." He supported the concept of revisiting and developing existing work.

== Release ==
Waters announced The Dark Side of the Moon Redux on 21 July 2023, alongside a digital single, "Money". On 24 August, he released the second single, "Time", followed by the double A-side single "Speak to Me" / "Breathe" on 21 September. In October, Waters held two concerts at the London Palladium, where he performed The Dark Side of the Moon Redux, spoke on topics such as Julian Assange and read from his unpublished memoir.

A deluxe version was released on 14 March 2025. It contains the album, its three promotional singles on vinyl, a new single ("Us and Them"), and a live performance of the album on vinyl and CD.

== Critical reception ==
Professional ratings
Aggregate scores
Source	Rating
Metacritic	59/100
Review scores
Source	Rating
AllMusic	3/5 stars
Classic Rock	4/5 stars
Mojo	4/5 stars
Paste	4.6/10
Sputnikmusic	0.5/5
The Telegraph	4/5 stars
Uncut	6/10

On the review aggregator Metacritic, The Dark Side of the Moon Redux has a score of 59 out of 100, indicating a "mixed or average" reception based on nine reviews. In a positive review, David Quantick of Classic Rock called Redux "neither a massive gutting of the original nor a slavish copy". He wrote that "Time" sounded like a "boulder rolled up a hill, weary and aged", and described it and "Brain Damage" as "half-crooned" and effective. Uncut called Redux "interesting enough" for "an artistic exercise", while Mojo felt that "the new focus on these songs' lyrics proves deeply powerful, a different and profound kind of high", which makes the album "wholly valid, the unnerving, stirring adjunct Waters was aiming for".

In Ultimate Classic Rock, Nick DeRiso criticised the replacement of the other Pink Floyd members with "more words". He found much of the emotion of the original record was missing, and described Waters' additional lyrics as "Waters talking again, yet somehow not saying much". Jonah Krueger of Consequence argued that Redux existed only so Waters could "take the opportunity to re-write history, framing himself as the sole creative force behind The Dark Side of the Moon and using the Redux as some form of indulgent fodder to do so". He felt that many of Waters' changes made the album worse, though he complimented the overall production quality. Christian Kriticos of Paste had similar views, criticising the slow pace and spoken-word passages.

== Track listing ==
All lyrics are written by Roger Waters.

The Dark Side of the Moon Redux track listing
No.	Title	Music	Length
1.	"Speak to Me"	Nick Mason	1:54
2.	"Breathe"	Richard Wright; David Gilmour	3:22
3.	"On the Run"	Gilmour; Waters	3:47
4.	"Time"	Mason; Waters; Wright; Gilmour	7:19
5.	"The Great Gig in the Sky"	Wright; Clare Torry	5:47
6.	"Money"	Waters	7:33
7.	"Us and Them"	Wright	7:36
8.	"Any Colour You Like"	Gilmour; Mason; Wright	3:18
9.	"Brain Damage"	Waters	4:55
10.	"Eclipse"	Waters	2:20
Total length:			47:51

Additional track on vinyl issues

No.	Title	Length
11.	"(untitled)"	13:15

Note

- On the 2LP Vinyl releases, Side One spans "Speak to Me" through "Time", Side Two spans "The Great Gig in the Sky" and "Money", and Side Three spans "Us and Them" through "Eclipse". Side Four contains an untitled original composition.
- The cassette release splits the album the traditional way, between "The Great Gig in the Sky" and "Money".

== Personnel ==
Personnel taken from The Dark Side of the Moon Redux liner notes.

- Roger Waters – vocals, bass on "Any Colour You Like", VCS3
- Gus Seyffert – bass, guitar, percussion, keys, synth, backing vocals
- Joey Waronker – drums, percussion
- Jonathan Wilson – guitars, synth, organ
- Johnny Shepherd – organ, piano
- Via Mardot – theremin
- Azniv Korkejian – vocals
- Gabe Noel – string arrangements, strings, sarangi
- Jon Carin – keyboards, lap steel, synth, organ
- Robert Walter – piano on "The Great Gig in the Sky"

Production

- Gus Seyffert – production, engineering, mixing
- Roger Waters – production
- Sean Cook – additional engineering, mixing
- Adam Bradley Schreiber – theremin engineering
- Nathan Cimino – assistant engineer
- Sam Plecker – assistant engineer
- Chaz Sexton – assistant engineer
- Carlos Mas – assistant engineer
- Dave Cooley – mastering

== Charts ==
Chart performance for The Dark Side of the Moon Redux
Chart (2023)	Peak position
Australian Albums (ARIA)	55
Austrian Albums (Ö3 Austria)	6
Belgian Albums (Ultratop Flanders)	9
Belgian Albums (Ultratop Wallonia)	1
Czech Albums (ČNS IFPI)	23
Croatian International Albums (HDU)	4
Danish Albums (Hitlisten)	8
Dutch Albums (Album Top 100)	3
Finnish Albums (Suomen virallinen lista)	32
French Albums (SNEP)	11
German Albums (Offizielle Top 100)	3
Hungarian Albums (MAHASZ)	30
Irish Albums (IRMA)	98
Italian Albums (FIMI)	5
Japanese Albums (Oricon)	32
Japanese Hot Albums (Billboard Japan)	41
New Zealand Albums (RMNZ)	24
Polish Albums (ZPAV)	6
Portuguese Albums (AFP)	1
Scottish Albums (Official Charts)	1
Spanish Albums (Promusicae)	20
Swedish Albums (Sverigetopplistan)	39
Swiss Albums (Schweizer Hitparade)	5
UK Albums (Official Charts)	4
UK Album Downloads (Official Charts)	1
UK Independent Albums (Official Charts)	1
UK Progressive Albums (Official Charts)	2
UK Rock & Metal Albums (Official Charts)	1
US Billboard 200	142
US Independent Albums (Billboard)	27

== The Dark Side of the Moon Redux Live ==
The Dark Side of the Moon Redux Live

Live album by Roger Waters
- Released: 12 April 2025
- Recorded: 8–9 October 2023
- Venue: London Palladium
- Label: Cooking Vinyl
- Producers: Roger Waters; Gus Seyffert

Roger Waters chronology
The Dark Side of the Moon Redux (2023)	The Dark Side of the Moon Redux Live (2025)	This Is Not a Drill – Live From Prague (2025)

The Dark Side of the Moon Redux Live is a live album by Roger Waters, featuring a complete performance of the album. The recording is taken from the concerts at the London Palladium where he performed the full album along with his band on 8 and 9 October 2023. First released as part of the deluxe box set of Redux, it had a stand-alone limited release on 12 April 2025, as part of Record Store Day.

=== Track listing ===
The Dark Side of the Moon Redux Live track listing
No.	Title	Music	Length
1.	"Speak to Me"	Mason
2.	"Breathe"	Waters; Wright; Gilmour
3.	"On the Run"	Waters; Gilmour
4.	"Time"	Waters; Gilmour; Wright; Mason
5.	"The Great Gig in the Sky"	Wright; Torry
6.	"Money"	Waters
7.	"Us and Them"	Waters; Wright
8.	"Any Colour You Like"	Gilmour; Mason; Wright
9.	"Brain Damage"	Waters
10.	"Eclipse"	Waters

- All tracks are noted as "Live".
