= On the Run (instrumental) =

Instrumental by Pink Floyd

from the album The Dark Side of the Moon
- Released: 1 March 1973
- Recorded: 11 October 1972 – 9 February 1973
- Genre: Electronic; experimental; sound collage
- Length: 3:45
- Label: Harvest
- Composers: David Gilmour; Roger Waters
- Producer: Pink Floyd

Audio sample
- Synthesized Doppler effect: file; help

"On the Run" is the third track (Note: Some CD pressings merge "Speak to Me" and "Breathe" and if these songs are considered to be one song then this song is the second track.) from English rock band Pink Floyd's 1973 album, The Dark Side of the Moon. It is an instrumental piece performed on an EMS synthesizer (Synthi AKS). It deals with the pressures of travel, specifically air travel, which according to Richard Wright, would often bring fear of death. The basic idea was first developed by David Gilmour, but improved with a different note sequence by Roger Waters, earning both a writing credit.

== Composition ==
This piece was created by entering an 8-note sequence into a Synthi AKS synthesiser made by the British synthesiser manufacturer EMS and speeding it up, with an added white noise into Channel A on the Ring Modulator, and the Sequencer trigger pulse into Channel B, thus creating the hi-hat sound. The band then added backwards guitar parts, created by dragging a microphone stand down the fretboard, reversing the tape, and panning left to right. There are also other Synthi and VCS 3 synthesizer parts, made to sound like a vehicle passing, giving a Doppler effect. The 8 note sequence is played at a tempo of 165 BPM, while both filter frequency and resonance are modulated. Near the end, the only guitar part is heard: a chord over the explosion of the presumed aircraft. This gradually fades, segueing into the chiming clocks introduction of the following "Time".

An initial backing track was recorded on 31 May 1972, but scrapped and replaced with the a new version on 13 June. Work on the track continued throughout the rest of the year, with the final overdubs recorded on 9 February 1973. The studio log records this work as "Weird Noises" and "More Weird Noises".

Everything you hear on that track, apart from the sound effects, was done live. It was all coming out of the Synthi A. Even the hi-hat over the top of it was done on that synth. There was no means of synchronising any two performances – that's why it was live. Even on the road, before a show, they would have to punch in the notes of the sequence manually, very slowly, then speed it up on playback to give the fast, sequenced effect you hear on the record.

— Alan Parsons, engineer

=== Voices ===
- Twenty-seven seconds into the piece, a female voice on a loudspeaker can be heard; apparently an airport public address system. She says, "Have your baggage and passport ready and then follow the green line to customs and immigration. BEA 215 to Rome, Cairo and Lagos." Engineer Alan Parsons reused this sample on the "Sea Lions in the Departure Lounge" bonus track of the 2007 deluxe edition of Tales of Mystery and Imagination by the Alan Parsons Project.
- At 1:53, Roger "The Hat" Manifold, Pink Floyd’s road manager says, "Live for today, gone tomorrow – that's me", then laughs.

== Reception ==
In a contemporary review for The Dark Side of the Moon, Loyd Grossman of Rolling Stone described "On the Run" as a "standout with footsteps racing from side to side successfully eluding any number of odd malevolent rumbles and explosions only to be killed off by the clock's ticking that leads into "Time".

== Live performances ==
Pink Floyd started playing Dark Side of the Moon live in 1972. Before the album's release, "On The Run" was replaced with "The Travel Sequence", a jam featuring call and responses from Gilmour on electric guitar and Wright on a Wurlitzer electronic piano. A studio version of this track was recorded, but not released until 2011. The group decided it was not good enough to include on the album, and after playing with the Synthi AKS, decided a track featuring the synthesizer would be a suitable replacement.

From 1973, live performances of Dark Side of the Moon included the sequencer-based version of the song. At the end of the song, a model aeroplane flew from one end of the arena to the other, appearing to crash and explode. The same effect was used in the A Momentary Lapse of Reason Tour, but with a flying bed rather than an aeroplane. This live version of the song can be heard on the Delicate Sound of Thunder concert video, although it did not appear on the album release, however, it appears on the 2019 reissue and remixed version of the album. The Division Bell Tour would reuse the aeroplane, only this time with the back of it in flames for additional effects. This live version appears on the CD, vinyl, and DVD releases of Pulse.

Roger Waters and his solo band performed this song live from 2006 to 2008 during his tour, The Dark Side of the Moon Live.

The song was used by longtime public address announcers Tommy Edwards and Ray Clay of the Chicago Bulls organization during the Michael Jordan era as the theme for the visiting team at Bulls' home games.

During their 1970s "Musicradio" era, Chicago radio station WLS-AM 890 used part of the song as background music for recorded prize and contest phone calls that were played on-air.

== Personnel ==
- David Gilmour – electric guitar, EMS Synthi AKS
- Roger Waters – EMS VCS 3, tape effects
- Richard Wright – Hammond organ, Leslie speaker
- Nick Mason – percussion (heartbeat), tape effects

with:

- Peter James – footsteps
- Roger "The Hat" Manifold – spoken vocal

== Other versions ==
- The Seatbelts cover the song on the Cowboy Bebop soundtrack.
- The music for the video game Delta for Commodore 64 is heavily inspired by this song.
- The song was covered by The Flaming Lips along with the rest of Pink Floyd's album The Dark Side of the Moon.
- Shpongle appears to have done a version of the song in the track "Tickling the Amygdala" from the album Museum of Consciousness.
- On the Various Artists albums Return to the Dark Side of the Moon and Yes Progressive Rock!, Alan White and Larry Fast (of Nektar and Synergy) perform this song.
