= Ben Watts =

British-born photographer (born 1967)

- Born: 19 January 1967 (age 59); London, England
- Education: Sydney College of the Arts
- Occupation: Photographer
- Years active: 2000–present
- Father: Peter Watts
- Relatives: Naomi Watts (sister)

Benjamin Oliver Anthony Watts (born 19 January 1967) is a British photographer based in New York City, whose work has been published in various international fashion magazines, such as Elle, Vogue, Harper's Bazaar, Vanity Fair, and Condé Nast Traveller.

== Biography ==
Watts was brought up in Australia. He is the older brother of actress Naomi Watts and son of Peter Watts, who was initially a road manager for Pink Floyd and later their sound engineer, and was found dead of an apparent heroin overdose in August 1976, aged 30.

Watts studied at the Sydney College of the Arts in Australia, where he started his photographic career as a photographer's assistant.

== Career ==
He first came to New York in 1990, where he started documenting urban youth and was especially fascinated by hip hop culture. He moved to New York circa 1993. His work was shown in Vibe and Rolling Stone and in advertisements for Nike, Reebok and Gap.

Besides his work for fashion magazines, Watts has shot advertising campaigns for companies such as Polo Ralph Lauren, Kodak, Sony Music and Apple.

== Publications ==
- Portraits (2000)
- Body and Soul (2001)
- Tattoo Nation (2002)
- Soul Style (2003)
- History of Hip Hop (2003)
- Tomo (2003)
- Big Up (2004)
- Montauk Dreaming (2015)
