= Brain Damage (Pink Floyd song) =

1973 song by Pink Floyd

Song by Pink Floyd

from the album The Dark Side of the Moon
- Released: 1 March 1973
- Recorded: 23 June 1972 – February 1973
- Studio: EMI, London
- Genre: Psychedelic rock; progressive rock
- Length: 3:48; 5:51 (combined with "Eclipse")
- Label: Harvest
- Songwriter: Roger Waters
- Producer: Pink Floyd

Audio sample
- Second chorus: file; help

"Brain Damage" is the ninth track (Note: Some CD pressings merge "Speak to Me" and "Breathe", making "Brain Damage" the eighth track.) from English rock band Pink Floyd's 1973 album The Dark Side of the Moon. It was written and sung by Roger Waters (with harmonies by David Gilmour), who would continue to sing it on his solo tours. Gilmour sang the lead vocal when Pink Floyd performed it live on the Division Bell Tour (as can be heard on Pulse). The band originally called this track "Lunatic" during live performances and recording sessions. "Brain Damage" was released as a digital single on 19 January 2023 to promote The Dark Side of the Moon 50th Anniversary box set.

== Composition ==
When the band reconvened after the American leg of the Meddle tour, Roger Waters brought with him a prototype version of "Brain Damage" along with other songs such as "Money". He had been playing the song during the recording of the Meddle album in 1971, when it was called "The Dark Side of the Moon". Eventually this title would be used for the album itself. The choruses include the lyric "I'll see you on the dark side of the moon."

After road testing the new suite entitled "A Piece for Assorted Lunatics", the song was recorded in October along with "Any Colour You Like". The piece represents Waters' association with acoustic-tinged ballads, and along with "If" and "Grantchester Meadows", "Brain Damage" uses a simple melody and delivery. David Gilmour actively encouraged Waters to sing the song, even though at this time he wasn't particularly confident about his vocal abilities.

== Themes ==
Roger Waters has stated that the insanity-themed lyrics are based on former Floyd frontman Syd Barrett's mental instability, with the line "I'll see you on the dark side of the moon" indicating that he felt related to him in terms of mental idiosyncrasies. The line "And if the band you're in starts playing different tunes..." references Barrett's behaviour near the end of his tenure with the band; because of his mental problems, there were more than a few occasions where Barrett would play a different song than the rest of the band in the middle of a concert. The song has a rather famous opening line, "The lunatic is on the grass...", whereby Waters is referring to areas of turf which display signs saying "Please keep off the grass" with the exaggerated implication that disobeying such signs might indicate insanity. The lyrics' tongue-in-cheek nature is further emphasised by Waters' assertion in the 2003 documentary Classic Albums: Pink Floyd – The Making of The Dark Side of the Moon that not letting people on such beautiful grass was the real insanity. Waters said that the particular patch of grass he had in mind when writing the song was to the rear of King's College, Cambridge.

The German literary scholar and media theorist Friedrich Kittler attaches great relevance to the song, referring to its lyrics as well as to its technological arrangement. For him, the three verses stage the (sound) technological evolution from mono to stereo, culminating in total, "maddening" surround sound.

In a 2008 paper in Journal of the Association of American Medical Colleges Fusar-Poli and Madini suggest that the song includes avant-garde techniques and philosophical lyrics can be approached and analysed from a psychological perspective. The line "Got to keep the loonies on the path" references the attempt to maintain order and establish sanity. The detached description of a lobotomy is demonstrated in the lines "You raise the blade, you make the change. You re-arrange me 'till I'm sane". The line "I'll see you on the dark side of the moon", which became a famous metaphor of human irrationality, expresses that madness is always present but invisible, waiting to be exposed.

== Versions ==
Some releases of Dark Side of the Moon, for example TC-SHVL. 804 (cassette, New Zealand release) and Q4SHVL 804 (quad LP, UK release) have a different mix of "Brain Damage". During the closing instrumental, beginning at about 3:02, after the second chorus and leading into the final track, "Eclipse", only Peter Watts' "lunatic laughing" is heard, repeatedly, unlike other versions which have the speech sample "I can't think of anything to say", then Peter Watts' laugh and another sample "I think it's marvelous (ha ha ha)".

== Personnel ==
- Roger Waters – bass guitar, lead vocals, tape effects
- David Gilmour – electric guitars, harmony vocals
- Richard Wright – Hammond organ, EMS VCS 3
- Nick Mason – drums, tubular bells, tape effects

with:

- Lesley Duncan – backing vocals
- Doris Troy – backing vocals
- Barry St. John – backing vocals
- Liza Strike – backing vocals

The uncredited manic laughter is that of Pink Floyd's then-road manager, Peter Watts.

== Certifications ==
Region	Certification	Certified units/sales
New Zealand (RMNZ)	Platinum	30,000^{‡}
United Kingdom (BPI)	Silver	200,000^{‡}
^{‡} Sales+streaming figures based on certification alone.
