= Peter Watts (manager) =

English road manager and sound engineer (1946–1976)

- Born: 16 January 1946; Bedford, Bedfordshire, England
- Died: 2 August 1976 (aged 30); Notting Hill, London, England
- Occupations: Road manager; Sound engineer
- Employer: Pink Floyd
- Spouses: Myfanwy Edwards-Roberts (m. 1966; div. 1972) Patricia Deighton (m. 1976)
- Children: Ben Watts; Naomi Watts

Peter Anthony Watts (16 January 1946 – 2 August 1976) was an English road manager and sound engineer who worked with rock band Pink Floyd.

== Early life ==
Watts was born on 16 January 1946, in Bedford, Bedfordshire, England, the son of Jane Patricia Grace (née Rolt) and Anthony Watts. Watts had one older brother, Michael, and one younger sister, Patricia. Watts' mother remarried, to Anthony Daniells, in 1989.

== Career ==
Watts was the road manager for Pretty Things before joining Pink Floyd as their first experienced road manager. Alongside fellow roadie Alan Styles, he appears on the rear cover of Pink Floyd's 1969 album Ummagumma, shown with the band's van and equipment laid out on a runway at Biggin Hill Airport, with the intention of replicating the "exploded" drawings of military aircraft and their payloads, which were popular at the time. On the 1973 album The Dark Side of the Moon, he contributed the repeated laughter on "Brain Damage", and was also heard in the album's overture, "Speak to Me". His second wife Patricia 'Puddie' Watts was responsible for the line about the "geezer" who was "cruisin' for a bruisin'" used in the segue between "Money" and "Us and Them", and the words "I never said I was frightened of dying." heard near the end of "The Great Gig in the Sky".

== Personal life ==
In 1966, Watts married Myfanwy Edwards-Roberts, the daughter of a Welsh father and Australian mother, who was an antiques dealer and costume and set designer. They had two children, Ben (b. 1967; a photographer), and Naomi (b. 1968; an actress).

The couple divorced in 1972. After the divorce, the children were raised by their grandparents and their mother as she built a career.

Peter Watts left Pink Floyd's service in 1974. In 1976, he married Patricia Deighton, known as "Puddie", who can also be heard on The Dark Side of the Moon.

== Death ==
In August 1976, Watts was found dead in a flat in Notting Hill, London, from a heroin overdose. After his death, Pink Floyd provided financial support to his two young children. The money allowed the family to move to Sydney, Australia, in 1982, where Edwards-Roberts became part of a burgeoning film industry.
