= Any Colour You Like =

Single by Pink Floyd

from the album The Dark Side of the Moon
- A-side: "Money"
- Released: 1 March 1973
- Recorded: 17 June 1972 – 6 February 1973
- Studio: EMI, London
- Genre: Psychedelic rock; psychedelic funk; jazz rock
- Length: 3:25
- Label: Harvest
- Composers: David Gilmour; Nick Mason; Richard Wright
- Producer: Pink Floyd

Pink Floyd singles chronology
"Free Four" (1972)	"Money" / "Any Colour You Like" (1973)	"Us and Them" / "Time" (1974)

Audio sample
- file; help

"Any Colour You Like" is the eighth track (Note: Some CD pressings merge "Speak to Me" and "Breathe", which would make “Any Colour You Like” the seventh track.) on The Dark Side of the Moon, English rock band Pink Floyd's 1973 album. It is an instrumental written by David Gilmour, Richard Wright and Nick Mason.

== Composition ==
The piece itself has no lyrics and consists of a synthesised tune which segues into a guitar solo (some scat vocals are added later; these were more prominent in live versions but are still audible in the studio recording). It is approximately three minutes, 25 seconds in length. The piece used advanced effects for the time both in the keyboard and the guitar. Richard Wright used a VCS 3 synthesizer which was fed through a long tape loop to create the rising and falling keyboard solo. David Gilmour used two guitars with the Uni-Vibe guitar effect to create the harmonizing guitar solo for the rest of the work. "Any Colour You Like" is also known (and is even listed on the Dark Side guitar tablature book) as "Breathe (Second Reprise)" because the piece shares the same chord pattern (albeit somewhat funkier and uptempo) as the album's second song "Breathe" and its reprise at the end of "Time". It has also nearly the same chord sequence just transposed a whole step lower from E minor to D minor. In the original liner notes, songwriting credits contain a typo with Nick Mason's last name listed as Marson.

The origin of the title is unclear. Waters may have settled this question, in an interview with the musicologist and author Phil Rose, for Rose's collection of analytical essays, Which One's Pink?:

"In Cambridge where I lived, people would come from London in a van – a truck –-- open the back and stand on the tailboard of the truck, and the truck's full of stuff that they're trying to sell. And they have a very quick and slick patter, and they're selling things like crockery, china, sets of knives and forks. All kinds of different things, and they sell it very cheap with a patter. They tell you what it is, and they say 'It's ten plates, lady, and it's this, that, and the other, and eight cups and saucers, and for the lot I'm asking NOT ten pounds, NOT five pounds, NOT three pounds... fifty bob to you!', and they get rid of this stuff like this. If they had sets of china, and they were all the same colour, they would say, 'You can 'ave 'em, ten bob to you, love. Any colour you like, they're all blue.' And that was just part of that patter. So, metaphorically, 'Any Colour You Like' is interesting, in that sense, because it denotes offering a choice where there is none. And it's also interesting that in the phrase, 'Any colour you like, they're all blue', I don't know why, but in my mind it's always 'they're all blue', which, if you think about it, relates very much to the light and dark, sun and moon, good and evil. You make your choice but it's always blue."

== Live versions ==
On earlier Pink Floyd bootlegged versions of the piece, there was no keyboard solo, and the work was a long jam piece called "Scat Section" or "Scat". Gilmour frequently sang along with his guitar solo and the band's female backing singers sometimes came up on stage and sang as well.

In 1975, it was often extended, sometimes up to nearly fifteen minutes. Gilmour and the backing singers often sang along with it.

In 1994, it was considerably modified, to be more keyboard-heavy, though not extended, as in all earlier performances. This version is included on Pulse.

Waters performed it in his 2006–08 The Dark Side of the Moon Live tour, and his 2022–23 This Is Not a Drill tour.

== Personnel ==
- David Gilmour – electric guitars, scat singing
- Richard Wright – Hammond organ, EMS VCS 3, EMS Synthi AKS
- Roger Waters – bass guitar
- Nick Mason – drums, percussion
