= Speak to Me =

1973 instrumental by Pink Floyd

Instrumental by Pink Floyd

from the album The Dark Side of the Moon
- Released: 1 March 1973
- Recorded: 23 June and 1 November 1972; 21 January 1973
- Genre: Sound collage; avant-garde
- Length: 1:07; 3:54 (combined with "Breathe")
- Label: Harvest
- Composer: Nick Mason
- Producer: Pink Floyd

Audio sample
- Final 30 seconds of the song; the abrupt cut-off is because the end of "Speak to Me" leads into "Breathe": file; help

"Speak to Me" is the first track (Note: Some CD pressings merge "Speak to Me" and "Breathe".) on the English rock band Pink Floyd's eighth studio album, The Dark Side of the Moon (1973), on which it forms an overture. Nick Mason receives a rare solo writing credit for the track, though recollections differ as to the reasons for this. Mason states that he created the track himself, whereas Richard Wright and Roger Waters stated the credit was a "gift" to Mason to give him some publishing income (subsequently regretted by Waters following his acrimonious departure from the band). Live versions are included on Pulse (1995) and The Dark Side of the Moon Live at Wembley 1974 (2023).

== Recording ==
On 23 June 1972 a brief sound collage had been pieced together featuring parts recorded from completed songs by that date; not much work would continue. Waters later began to compile a series of questions that tied to the concept of the album; he wrote the questions on cards and placed them in the recording booth where sat those who were to answer the questions – they would read the question silently and then speak their answer which would be recorded. One of these questions was "What's your favourite colour?", which was intended to ease the interviewee into the conversation. The questions would then escalate to questions such as "When was last time you thumped someone?", "Why did you do it?", "Were you in the right?", "Are you afraid of dying?", "Do you think you're going mad?", and "What do you think of the dark side of the moon?".

On 1 November 1972, whilst Paul McCartney was in one of the other studios recording Red Rose Speedway, Waters decided to ask McCartney and his wife Linda to take part in the questions, recording their answers. The song would be worked on during the same day. Later, while mixing the album in late January 1973, the inclusion of the McCartneys was vetoed. This was because Waters felt his responses were too defensive and professional. Clare Torry's vocal on "The Great Gig in the Sky", which was recorded on 21 January 1973, would also be added to the collage.

== Composition ==
The song itself is a sound collage, which features no lyrics (although it contains parts of the conversation tapes that Pink Floyd recorded, as well as a short snippet of Clare Torry's vocal performance on "The Great Gig in the Sky"), and consists of a series of sound effects. It leads into the first performance piece on the album, "Breathe". As a result, they are usually played together on the radio, and most later re-releases merge the two songs.

== Sound effects ==
Noticeable sound and instrument effects include:

- Heartbeat; this can also be heard at the end of "Eclipse"
- Clock ticking, also heard in "Time"
- Manic laughter of Peter Watts, also heard in "Brain Damage"
- Cash register, paper tearing, and coins falling, also heard in "Money"
- Helicopter noise, also heard in "On the Run"
- Clare Torry's wordless vocals, also heard in "The Great Gig in the Sky"
- Backwards piano chord, which leads into "Breathe"

== Spoken parts ==
I've been mad for fucking years, absolutely years. I've been over the edge for yonks, been working with bands so long. I think 'Crikey'.

— Chris Adamson, band road crew and technician

I've always been mad, I know I've been mad, like the most of us have. They had to explain why you're mad, even if you're not mad.

— Gerry O'Driscoll, Abbey Road Studios doorman

== Personnel ==
- Nick Mason – percussion, tape effects, tape loops
- Roger Waters – tape effects, tape loops
- Richard Wright – reversed piano

== Roger Waters version ==
"Speak to Me"

Single by Roger Waters

from the album The Dark Side of the Moon Redux
- A-side: "Breathe"
- Released: 21 September 2023
- Genre: Ambient; spoken word
- Length: 1:54; 5:16 (with "Breathe")
- Label: SGB; Cooking Vinyl
- Songwriter: Mason
- Lyricist: Waters

Roger Waters singles chronology
"Time" (2023)	"Speak to Me" / "Breathe" (2023)

On 21 September 2023, former Pink Floyd bassist Roger Waters released "Speak to Me", backed with "Breathe" as the third single in promotion of his seventh studio album, a complete re-recording of The Dark Side of the Moon, The Dark Side of the Moon Redux. The two tracks came with a lyric video.

During 2023, Waters had announced that in celebration of the fiftieth anniversary of his bands seventh studio album The Dark Side of the Moon, he would be releasing a full-length re-recording of the record that did not feature the rest of Pink Floyd that would try and re-address the statements made on that record. The album was released on 6 October 2023; since then, "Money" and "Time" have been released as singles.

Instead of the original, experimental sound collage aesthetic of the original, the new version of "Speak to Me" is a spoken word piece with "chilling baritone vocals" from Waters. The lyrics of the new version of the track also contain the lyrics of the track "Free Four", a song about mortality and death.

=== Personnel ===
- Roger Waters – vocals
- Gus Seyffert – bass, guitar, percussion, keys, synth, backing vocals
- Joey Waronker – drums, percussion
- Jonathan Wilson – guitars, synth, organ
- Johnny Shepherd – organ, piano
- Via Mardot – theremin
- Azniv Korkejian – vocals
- Gabe Noel – string arrangements, strings, sarangi
- Jon Carin – keyboards, lap steel, synth, organ
