= Breathe (Pink Floyd song) =

1973 song by Pink Floyd

Song by Pink Floyd

from the album The Dark Side of the Moon
- Released: 1 March 1973
- Recorded: 22 June 1972 – 27 January 1973
- Genre: Progressive rock; psychedelic rock
- Length: 2:47; 3:54 (combined with "Speak to Me")
- Label: Harvest
- Composers: Richard Wright; David Gilmour
- Lyricist: Roger Waters
- Producer: Pink Floyd

Audio sample
- First verse: file; help

"Breathe" (sometimes called "Breathe (In the Air)") is a song by English rock band Pink Floyd. It appears on their 1973 album The Dark Side of the Moon.

== Authorship and composition ==
The authorship for the musical composition of this song is credited to David Gilmour and Richard Wright for the music, while the lyrics are solely credited to Roger Waters. Waters said The Dark Side of the Moon "is a little adolescent and naïve in its preoccupations, but I'm not belittling it. It's like a rather wonderful, naïve painting. 'Breathe in the air / Don't be afraid to care' – that's the opening couplet. Well, yeah, I can cop that, but it's kind of simplistic stuff."

The song is slow-paced and rich in texture, and features Gilmour playing the electric guitar with a Uni-Vibe and lap steel guitar with a volume pedal and several overdubs. On the original album, it is a separate track from "Speak to Me", the sound collage that opens the first side. Since this track segues into "Breathe" via a sustained backwards piano chord, the two are conjoined on most CD versions of the album. A one-minute reprise features at the end of the song "Time", without the slide guitar and using Farfisa organ and Wurlitzer electronic piano in place of Hammond organ and Rhodes piano.

The chords for much of the song alternate between E minor(add9) and A major, with a turnaround appearing before the verses and then functioning as a chorus, consisting of C major seventh, B minor seventh, F major seventh, G major, D7(♯9) and D7(♭9). Wright admitted to having lifted the D7(#9) in the progression from Miles Davis' Kind of Blue. It is an exact quote from bar 9 of "All Blues" even though the 2 songs are in different keys.

Along with the other Pink Floyd tracks "Time" and "The Great Gig in the Sky", "Breathe" is seen as Gilmour "carving out a more distinctive style" with the introduction of blues-based chords and solos. "Breathe" has also been seen to "embrace ecology".

== Alternative and live versions ==
- The Pulse CD and DVD features a live version of the song with a run time of 2:33.
- The song was played at the Live 8 concert and features on the DVD. For that performance, "Breathe" and "Breathe (Reprise)" were combined to form one song. Although Pink Floyd themselves had never done this before, the London Philharmonic Orchestra had previously covered the song in this manner on their 1995 album Us and Them: Symphonic Pink Floyd.
- The solo Roger Waters DVD and CD, In the Flesh – Live, features a version of the song sung by Doyle Bramhall and Jon Carin.
- Live versions with Richard Wright appear on the Gilmour solo Remember That Night DVD and Live in Gdańsk CD. The Live in Gdańsk version is titled "Breathe (In the Air)" rather than just "Breathe".
- "Breathe (Reprise)" appears (along with "Time") on Gilmour's 2017 live video and album Live at Pompeii.
- A live version is found on The Dark Side of the Moon Live at Wembley 1974 (2023).

== Single version ==
This song was released as a single in France only in 1974, as the B-side to the single Time. However, for reasons that remain unknown, it was not released internationally.

== Personnel ==
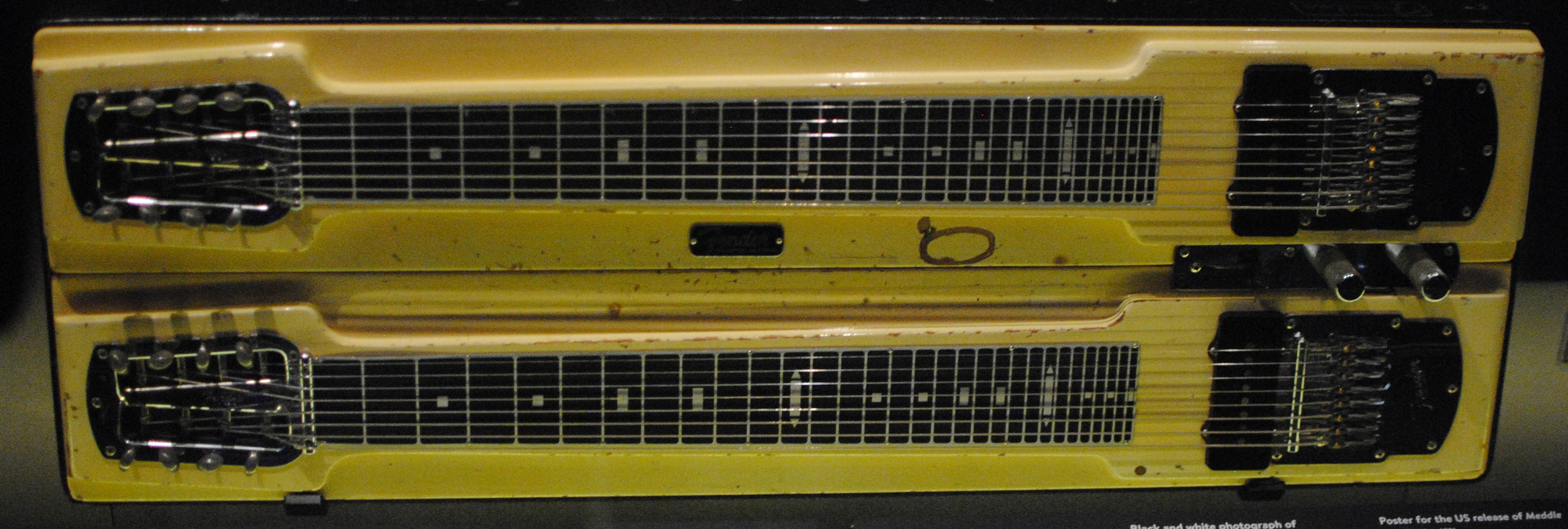
Fender 'Duo 1000' double-neck steel guitar (1962), purchased in Seattle in October 1970 by Gilmour, and used on "Breathe"; displayed at the Pink Floyd: Their Mortal Remains exhibition

- David Gilmour – electric guitar, pedal steel guitar, lead and backing vocals
- Roger Waters – bass guitar
- Richard Wright – Hammond organ, Fender Rhodes electric piano
- Nick Mason – drums

== Certifications ==
Certifications for "Breathe"
Region	Certification	Certified units/sales
Italy (FIMI)	Gold	35,000^{‡}
New Zealand (RMNZ)	Platinum	30,000^{‡}
United Kingdom (BPI)	Silver	200,000^{‡}
^{‡} Sales+streaming figures based on certification alone.

== Cover versions ==
- An orchestrated version, arranged by Jaz Coleman, appears on the 1995 London Philharmonic Orchestra album Us and Them: Symphonic Pink Floyd.
- Sea of Green covered "Breathe" and "Breathe (Reprise)" on their album Time to Fly in 2001.
- "Breathe" is covered on 2002 Pink Floyd tribute album An All Star Lineup Performing the Songs of Pink Floyd featuring McAuley Schenker Group vocalist Robin McAuley and Steely Dan/Doobie Brothers guitarist Jeff "Skunk" Baxter.
- Flaming Lips included a version of "Breathe" in their act at the Glastonbury Festival in 2003 and frequently during their subsequent tour and performed a live version for Late Night with Jimmy Fallon in 2010. Flaming Lips also covered the song with Stardeath and White Dwarfs on the band's 2009 album The Flaming Lips and Stardeath and White Dwarfs with Henry Rollins and Peaches Doing The Dark Side of the Moon.
- A version of "Breathe" by The Shins is included on the 2007 compilation album The Saturday Sessions: The Dermot O'Leary Show.
- Brit Floyd plays Breathe (Reprise) as a staple, directly following Time. It can be found on all CDs and DVDs. Space and Time Live in Amsterdam also contains Breathe.
- Capital Cities covered the song and incorporated a sample of Tupac Shakur's rap from Scarface's "Smile," which features a similar lyric to the Pink Floyd song.
- Ocean Alley covered the song in a medley as well as Comfortably Numb and Money for Triple J's Like A Version in 2021.
- Dan Avidan, of Ninja Sex Party and Game Grumps fame, and acoustic duo Super Guitar Bros covered the song on their second cover album, 2023’s “Dan Avidan & Super Guitar Bros II”. He also covered another Dark Side of the Moon song, Time (Pink Floyd song) in 2026.

== Roger Waters version ==
"Breathe"

Single by Roger Waters

from the album The Dark Side of the Moon Redux
- A-side: "Speak to Me"
- Released: 21 September 2023
- Genre: Art pop
- Length: 3:22; 5:16 (with "Speak to Me")
- Label: SGB; Cooking Vinyl
- Composers: Wright; Gilmour
- Lyricist: Waters

Roger Waters singles chronology
"Time" (2023)	"Speak to Me" / "Breathe" (2023)

Pink Floyd bassist Roger Waters released "Breathe" alongside "Speak to Me" on 21 September 2023 as the third single in promotion of his seventh studio album, The Dark Side of the Moon Redux, a complete recreation of the original album The Dark Side of the Moon. The two tracks came with a lyric video.

Around early 2023, Waters announced that in celebration of the 50th anniversary of The Dark Side of the Moon, he would be releasing a complete recreation of the record that wouldn't feature the rest of Pink Floyd members, trying to re-address the emotional and political statements made on that record. The album was released on 6 October 2023, preceded by the singles "Money" and "Time", with "Breathe" and "Speak to Me" being released together as the final singles.

=== Personnel ===
- Roger Waters – vocals
- Gus Seyffert – bass, guitar, percussion, keys, synth, backing vocals
- Joey Waronker – drums, percussion
- Jonathan Wilson – guitars, synth, organ
- Johnny Shepherd – organ, piano
- Via Mardot – theremin
- Azniv Korkejian – vocals
- Gabe Noel – string arrangements, strings, sarangi
- Jon Carin – keyboards, lap steel, synth, organ
