= Time (Pink Floyd song) =

1973 single by Pink Floyd

- US Harvest Records single

Single by Pink Floyd

from the album The Dark Side of the Moon
- A-side: "Us and Them"
- Released: 4 February 1974 (US)
- Recorded: 3 June 1972 – 1 February 1973
- Studio: EMI, London
- Genre: Progressive rock
- Length: 7:05 (2023 remaster); 6:53 (album version); 3:33 (single edit)
- Label: Harvest
- Composers: Nick Mason; Roger Waters; Richard Wright; David Gilmour
- Lyricist: Roger Waters
- Producer: Pink Floyd

Pink Floyd US singles chronology
"Money" (1973)	"Time" (1974)	"Have a Cigar" (1975)

Audio
- "Time" on YouTube

Audio sample
- First chorus: file; help

"Time" is a song by the English rock band Pink Floyd. It is included as the fourth track on their eighth album The Dark Side of the Moon (1973) and was released as a single in the United States. With lyrics written by bassist Roger Waters and music composed jointly by the band, guitarist David Gilmour shares lead vocals with keyboardist Richard Wright (his last until "Wearing the Inside Out" on the band's 1994 album The Division Bell).

The lyrics deal with the passage of time. Waters got the idea when he realized he was no longer preparing for anything in life, but was right in the middle of it. He has described this realization taking place at ages 28 and 29 in various interviews. It is noted for its long introductory passage of clocks chiming and alarms ringing. The sounds were recorded in an antique store made as a quadrophonic test by engineer Alan Parsons, not specifically for the album.

The album track also includes a reprise of the song "Breathe". It is the only song on the album to credit all four principal members for songwriting, and the last to do so in the band's discography.

== Composition ==
"Time" is in the key of F♯ minor. Each clock at the beginning of the song was recorded separately in an antiques store. These clock sounds are followed by a two-minute passage dominated by Nick Mason's drum solo, with rototoms and backgrounded by a tick-tock sound created by Roger Waters picking the muted second and third strings on his bass. David Gilmour sings lead on the verses, while Richard Wright sings lead on the bridges with female singers and Gilmour providing backup vocals. The lyrics deal with Roger Waters' realization that life was not about preparing yourself for what happens next, but about grabbing control of your own destiny. The recording was recorded quadraphonically by sound engineer Alan Parsons in an antique shop and begins with an homage to the song Klingklang (1971/1972) by the group Kraftwerk, or rather, is reminiscent of it.

He [Alan Parsons] had just recently before we did that album gone out with a whole set of equipment and had recorded all these clocks in a clock shop. And we were doing the song Time, and he said "Listen, I just did all these things, I did all these clocks," and so we wheeled out his tape and listened to it and said "Great! Stick it on!" And that, actually, is Alan Parsons' idea.

— David Gilmour

The drums used on the Time track are roto-toms. I think we did some experiments with some other drums called boo-bans, which are very small, tuned drums, but the roto-toms actually gave the best effect.

— Nick Mason

According to an interview by Phil Taylor in 1994, David Gilmour had been using a Lexicon PCM-70 to store the circular delay sounds heard in "Time", which could duplicate the kind of echo he used to get from his old Binson echo unit.

The verse chords cycle through F♯ minor, A major, E major, and F♯ minor again. During this section, Gilmour's guitar and Wright's keyboards are panned to the extreme right and left of the stereo spectrum, respectively. Gilmour sings lead during this section.

The bridge section, with Wright singing lead, has a notably "thicker" texture, with the female backing vocalists singing multi-tracked "oohs" and "aahs" throughout, and Gilmour singing harmony with Wright in the second half. The chords of this section are D major seventh to A major ninth, which is repeated. The second half progresses from D major seventh to C♯ minor, then B minor to E major.

The first bridge leads to a guitar solo by Gilmour, which plays over the verse and bridge progressions. The solo is followed by another verse sung by Gilmour. When the bridge is repeated, it does not conclude on E major as before; instead, the B minor leads to an F major chord, while Waters's bass stays on B, resulting in an unusual dissonance as a transition to the key of E minor for "Breathe (Reprise)".

Pink Floyd performed the song live from 1972 to 1975, and after the departure of Waters, from 1987 to 1994. Waters began performing the song in his solo concerts, singing the verses himself, beginning in 1999 with In the Flesh and again with The Dark Side of the Moon Live from 2006 to 2008 (occasionally featuring guest appearances from Nick Mason) and the Us + Them Tour from 2017 to 2018. Gilmour has performed the song live on every one of his solo tours since the Division Bell Tour, with the late Richard Wright sharing vocals until his death.

== Reception ==
In a contemporary review for The Dark Side of the Moon, Loyd Grossman of Rolling Stone gave "Time" a positive review, describing the track as "a fine country-tinged rocker with a powerful guitar solo by David Gilmour". Billboard and Louder Sound ranked the song number nine and number five, respectively, on their lists of the 50 greatest Pink Floyd songs.

"Time" was named one of The Rock and Roll Hall of Fame's 500 Songs that Shaped Rock and Roll.

== Film ==
During live performances, the band back-projected a specially-commissioned, animated film by Ian Emes. The film was subsequently included as an extra on the Pulse DVD.

== Personnel ==
- David Gilmour – electric guitars, co-lead (verses and "Breathe (Reprise)") and backing vocals (bridges and "Breathe (Reprise)")
- Richard Wright – Farfisa organ, Wurlitzer electronic piano, EMS VCS 3, co-lead vocals (bridges)
- Roger Waters – bass guitar, EMS VCS 3
- Nick Mason – drums, rototoms

with:

- Doris Troy, Lesley Duncan, Liza Strike & Barry St. John – backing vocals

== Single ==
This song was released as a single in Canada, the United States And Venezuela as the B-side to "Us and Them", but in France, it was released as a single with "Breathe" as the B-side.

== Live versions ==
- Live versions of the song are on the Pink Floyd albums Delicate Sound of Thunder and Pulse. The Delicate Sound of Thunder version does not feature the reprise of "Breathe".
- A Roger Waters solo version is on the album In the Flesh: Live, sung by Waters, Doyle Bramhall II and Jon Carin.
- Live versions with Richard Wright appear on the David Gilmour solo Remember That Night DVD and Live in Gdańsk album.

== In popular culture ==
=== Television, films and video games ===
- "Time" was used as a lightning round cue on the 1987 MTV/Syndicated game show Remote Control hosted by Ken Ober.
- "Time" was used several times in the seventh episode of The Crowded Room, an Apple TV+ series. The song also featured at the end of season 2, episode 1 of the Amazon Prime Video series Outer Range.
- "Time" was used in the opening of the Marvel Cinematic Universe film Eternals.
- "Time" was used in the final trailer of the DC Extended Universe film The Flash.
- The ticking clock sounds from the track were used in the 2012 Summer Olympics opening ceremony playing in the short Journey along the Thames being played as the camera flys by Big Ben.

== Certifications ==
Region	Certification	Certified units/sales
Italy (FIMI) sales since 2009	Gold	25,000^{‡}
New Zealand (RMNZ)	2× Platinum	60,000^{‡}
United Kingdom (BPI) sales since 2009	Gold	400,000^{‡}
Streaming
Greece (IFPI Greece)	Gold	1,000,000^{†}
^{‡} Sales+streaming figures based on certification alone.^{†} Streaming-only figures based on certification alone.

== Roger Waters version ==
"Time"

Single by Roger Waters

from the album The Dark Side of the Moon Redux
- Released: 24 August 2023
- Genre: Art rock; art pop; chamber pop; ambient
- Length: 7:19
- Songwriters: Waters; Gilmour; Wright; Mason
- Producers: Waters; Gus Seyffert

Roger Waters singles chronology
"Money" (2023)	"Time" (2023)	"Speak to Me" / "Breathe" (2023)

Music video
- "Time" on YouTube

"Time" is a single by English musician and Pink Floyd cofounder Roger Waters, which serves as the second single to his album The Dark Side of the Moon Redux, a full re-recording of The Dark Side of the Moon.

Around early 2023, Waters announced that in celebration of the 50th anniversary of The Dark Side of the Moon, he would be releasing a full-length re-recording of the record not featuring the rest of Pink Floyd that would try and re-address the political and emotional statements made on that record. The record's name, cover, and lead single, "Money" was released on 21 July 2023. "Time" would be released 2 months later alongside a lyric video on 24 August 2023.

Similar to lead single "Money", Waters strips back much of the psychedelic instrumentation and heavily slows it down from the original, putting a greater emphasis on Waters' crooning vocals, atmospheric production, and in general a more mellow sound.

=== Personnel ===
- Roger Waters – vocals
- Gus Seyffert – bass, guitar, percussion, keys, synth, backing vocals
- Joey Waronker – drums, percussion
- Jonathan Wilson – guitars, synth, organ
- Johnny Shepherd – organ, piano
- Via Mardot – theremin
- Azniv Korkejian – vocals
- Gabe Noel – string arrangements, strings, sarangi
- Jon Carin – keyboards, lap steel, synth, organ

== Charts ==
Chart (2026)	Peak position
Greece International (IFPI)	57
UK Rock & Metal (Official Charts)	15
