= Money (Pink Floyd song) =

1973 single by Pink Floyd

- French picture sleeve

Single by Pink Floyd

from the album The Dark Side of the Moon
- B-side: "Any Colour You Like"
- Released: 7 May 1973
- Recorded: 6 June 1972 – 19 January 1973
- Studio: EMI (London)
- Genre: Progressive rock; blues rock; hard rock
- Length: 6:22 (album version); 3:59 (single edit)
- Label: Harvest
- Songwriter: Roger Waters
- Producer: Pink Floyd

Pink Floyd US singles chronology
"Free Four" (1972)	"Money" (1973)	"Time" (1974)

Music video
- "Money" on YouTube

Audio sample
- Intro and first verse: file; help

Roger Waters' bassline, described by Adrian Ashton as "one of the most memorable classic bass riffs ever recorded."

"Money" is a song by the English rock band Pink Floyd from their eighth studio album The Dark Side of the Moon (1973). Written by Roger Waters, it opened side two of the original album. Released as a single, it became the band's first hit in the United States, reaching number 10 in Cash Box magazine and number 13 on the Billboard Hot 100.

Distinctive elements of the song include its unusual time signature of 7/4, and the tape loop of money-related sound effects (such as a ringing cash register and a jingle of coins). These effects are timed right on the beats, and act as a count-in at the beginning to set the tempo and are heard periodically throughout the song.

The song was regularly performed by Pink Floyd and played on most tours since 1972, and has since been performed by David Gilmour and Waters on their respective solo tours. Gilmour re-recorded the song in 1981, while Waters released a re-recording of the song in 2023.

== Composition ==
"Money" has been described as a progressive rock, blues rock, and hard rock song. Much of the song is written in an unusual time signature, 7/4. (Note: Waters and Gilmour originally stated that the song was composed primarily in 7/8 time, although Gilmour later said, in a 1993 interview with Guitar World magazine, that the time signature was 7/4. Rick Wright confirmed in a US radio interview in 2000 that "Money" was composed in 7/4.) Waters wrote the central riff on an acoustic guitar and chose the time signature as it suited the "bluesy feel" of the song.

The structure and chord progression are based on the standard twelve-bar blues in the key of B minor, with the vocal melody and nearly all of Gilmour's soloing drawing on the pentatonic and blues scales. Two twelve-bar verses are followed by a twenty-bar instrumental section featuring a blues-style tenor saxophone solo performed by Dick Parry, accompanied by keyboard, bass, and drums. This is followed by a two-bar introduction in 4/4 leading into the guitar solo, which follows a twelve-bar blues structure extended to twenty-four bars.

Waters wrote the lyrics to express irony and to critique the power of money and the capitalist system in general. "Money interested me enormously," Waters remarked on the twentieth anniversary of The Dark Side of the Moon. "I remember thinking, 'Well, this is it and I have to decide whether I'm really a socialist or not.' I'm still keen on a general welfare society, but I became a capitalist. You have to accept it. I remember coveting a Bentley like crazy. The only way to get something like that was through rock or the football pools. I very much wanted all that material stuff." In another interview, he said he was "sure that the free market isn't the whole answer ... my hope is that mankind will evolve into a more co-operative and less competitive beast."

== Recording ==
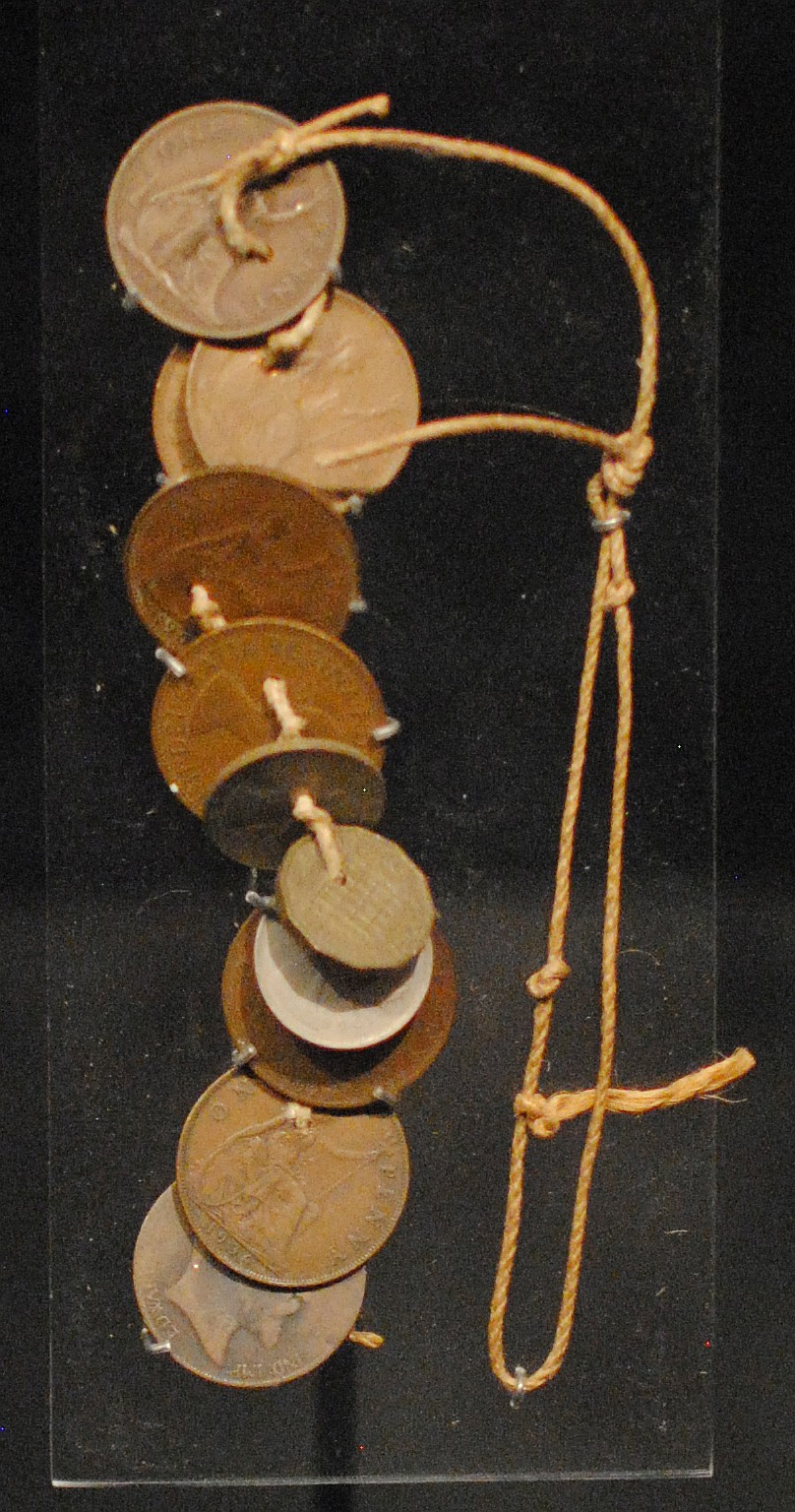
String of coins (one-third of original length), including pre-decimal 1d and 3d denominations, used for the sound effects on Money. Made by Nick Mason in 1972 and retained by his then-wife Lindy Mason. Displayed at the exhibition Pink Floyd: Their Mortal Remains.

"Money" begins with a rhythmic sequence of sound effects heard throughout the first several bars. This was created by splicing together recordings that Waters had made of clinking coins, a ringing cash register, tearing paper, a clicking counting machine, and other items, to construct a seven-beat effects loop. The original loop was used during early live performances but had to be re-recorded onto multi-track tape for the album. It was later adapted to four tracks in order to create a "walk around the room" effect in the quadraphonic mix of The Dark Side of the Moon.

"Money" (demo)
Waters's early demo recording of "Money", made in his garden shed

The demo tracks for the song, including some of the sound effects, were recorded in a makeshift studio that Roger Waters had set up in his garden shed. As recorded by the band, the song has a "bluesy, transatlantic feel", unlike Waters' original demo version, which he later described as "prissy and very English". As heard on Classic Albums: Pink Floyd – The Making of The Dark Side of the Moon, the demo is in the key of G-sharp minor, in contrast to the B minor of the final version.

Recording of Pink Floyd's version began on 6 June 1972 at Abbey Road Studios with a new recording of the sound effects. Some sounds, such as the cash register, were sourced from existing sound libraries. The one-inch tape with the effects was then transferred onto a quarter-inch tape that could be overdubbed. The following day, the band performed a run-through of the backing track live. Richard Wright played a Wurlitzer electronic piano through a wah-wah pedal, while Gilmour played a straightforward rhythm part. Waters later remarked that the live run-through caused the group to gradually speed up during the recording. Engineer Alan Parsons gradually faded out the loop before the vocals began. As the song progressed and the tempo increased, Parsons briefly raised the volume of the effects loop between the first and second verses, which, by coincidence, happened to fit the beat. After this point, the loop is not heard again.

After the backing track was completed, Nick Mason overdubbed drums, and Wright recorded a new electric piano part on 8 June. Gilmour then recorded three separate guitar solos. The first was played using a fuzz face and a Binson Echorec, giving it a strongly reverberated sound, and was then double-tracked. The second solo was recorded "dry", without any reverb or delay effects, while the third was recorded with similar settings to the first, but using a customised Lewis guitar with twenty-four frets, allowing a full four-octave range. This solo was doubled using automatic double tracking.

According to mix supervisor Chris Thomas, Gilmour preferred to record guitar parts live rather than adding effects in post-production. Thomas also asked Gilmour to double the descending riff at the end of the solo to make it sound "really big" leading into the final verse, and to double the bass riff on guitar so it would stand out more.

Dick Parry added his saxophone solo on 27 October. The band did not know many other musicians and approached Parry because he was an old friend of Gilmour. Gilmour also sang the lead vocal, which was double-tracked and included scat singing in response to some improvised guitar lines during the outro.

Various voices can be heard as the track fades into the next song, "Us and Them". Waters asked people present in the studio random questions and recorded their responses for inclusion in the track. Paul McCartney, who happened to be in the studio at the time, was also questioned, but his answer was not included in the final mix. However, Wings guitarist Henry McCullough contributed the line, "I don't know, I was really drunk at the time." Other lines included roadie Peter Watts’s wife Patricia: "I was definitely in the right. That geezer was cruising for a bruising", and roadie Chris Adamson: "So after, I was yelling and screaming and telling him why it wasn’t coming up on fader eleven. It came to a heavy blow, which sorted the matter out."

== Release ==
The single was released in the United States on 7 May 1973 in a shortened version, with most of the saxophone and guitar solos edited out. A special promotional single was distributed to radio stations, featuring both stereo and mono mixes. The word "bullshit" was intended to be censored; however, the stereo version mistakenly included the uncensored line, necessitating a new pressing.

"Money" became Pink Floyd's first major hit in the United States, reaching a peak position of number 13 on the Billboard Hot 100. It also topped the charts in France and was a top ten hit in Austria.

== Re-recording ==
The song was re-recorded for the 1981 Pink Floyd album A Collection of Great Dance Songs because Capitol Records refused to license the track to Columbia Records in the United States. With the assistance of co-producer James Guthrie, David Gilmour re-recorded the song, providing the vocals and playing all the instruments except for the saxophone, which was once again performed by Dick Parry. This re-recording was also released as a single.

The quadraphonic version of the song was released on the LP Quadrafile, a demonstration record issued in 1976. The purpose of this release was to allow listeners to compare the same material using four different quadraphonic encoding formats: SQ, QS Regular Matrix, CD-4, and UD-4. Atom Heart Mother, The Dark Side of the Moon, and Wish You Were Here were also released in the SQ format.

== Live ==
"Money" was regularly performed by Pink Floyd throughout their career. The song was first attempted live at The Dome, Brighton, on 20 January 1972 as part of the Dark Side of the Moon suite. However, the performance was abandoned after a few bars due to problems with the taped sound effects. Following a delay, the band opted instead to play "Atom Heart Mother". The first complete live performance took place the following day at the Guildhall, Portsmouth.

"Money" continued to be performed regularly, along with the rest of The Dark Side of the Moon, until the concert at Knebworth Park on 5 July 1975. It was later used as an encore during the 1977 In the Flesh tour. These later performances typically lasted up to twelve minutes, with the guitar solo significantly extended and often featuring multiple improvised sections.

During the performance in Montreal on 6 July 1977, a disruptive fan threw a beer bottle onto the stage, provoking Roger Waters' anger. While the band continued to play during the jam session section, Waters invited the fan onto the stage under the pretence of helping him up, then spat in his face. Bootleg recordings of the incident exist, and it has been cited as a contributing factor in the conceptual development of The Wall.

Following Waters’ departure, Pink Floyd continued to perform the song during their tours in support of A Momentary Lapse of Reason and The Division Bell.

David Gilmour also included "Money" in his solo performances, such as during his 1984 US tour supporting the album About Face, with versions often extended to around twelve minutes. He again featured the song during his Rattle That Lock Tour in 2015 and 2016, with similarly expanded arrangements.

Roger Waters regularly performed the song during his solo tours, including The Pros and Cons of Hitch Hiking and Radio K.A.O.S.. During the American leg of his In the Flesh tour, vocals were performed by Doyle Bramhall II, while the European leg featured Chester Kamen. For The Dark Side of the Moon Live tour, the lead vocals were provided by Dave Kilminster. Waters also performed the song at the Live Earth concert at Giants Stadium on 7 July 2007.

"Money" was included in Pink Floyd’s reunion set at the Live 8 concert in London in 2005, marking Roger Waters’ first appearance with the band in over two decades. The performance also included "Breathe" (including the reprise following "Time"), "Wish You Were Here", and "Comfortably Numb". Unusually for a live performance, the guitar solo in "Money" was limited to three choruses, as it appears on the studio album.

== Reception ==
"Money" is the only song from The Dark Side of the Moon to appear on the Billboard Top 100 chart of 1973, where it was placed at number 92. In 2008, Guitar World magazine ranked David Gilmour’s solo on "Money" as number 62 in its readers’ poll of "The 100 Greatest Guitar Solos". The song was also placed at number 69 on Rolling Stone’s list of "The 100 Greatest Guitar Songs of All Time".

Unlike many other Pink Floyd songs, "Money" eschews themes such as paranoia, insanity, the meaning of life, and the passage of time. Instead, the lyrics satirise crass materialism.

The commercial success of "Money" as a single significantly altered Pink Floyd's trajectory, propelling them from a cult act to mainstream stardom. This shift created challenges during live performances, as audiences increasingly expected to hear the song rather than the extended instrumental passages that had previously characterised their concerts.

== Music video ==
The music video for "Money" features a montage of scenes depicting various methods of earning and spending money. It includes close-up shots of a spinning coin, coins flowing through a mint, gold ingots in a bank, and a copy of The Dark Side of the Moon playing on a turntable. Additionally, the video shows the album travelling along a conveyor belt in what appears to be a factory or distribution plant. It also includes footage of people seemingly living in poverty, as well as scenes of gramophone records and audio equipment being destroyed with explosives during the song’s instrumental bridge.

== Personnel ==
Pink Floyd

- David Gilmour – vocals, electric guitars
- Nick Mason – drums, tape effects
- Roger Waters – bass guitar, tape effects
- Richard Wright – Wurlitzer electronic piano

Session musician

- Dick Parry – tenor saxophone

Production

- Pink Floyd – producers
- Alan Parsons – engineering
- Peter James – assistant (incorrectly identified as "Peter Jones" on first US pressings of the LP)
- Chris Thomas – mix supervisor

=== 1981 re-recording personnel ===
- David Gilmour – vocals, guitars, Wurlitzer electric piano, bass guitar, drums
- Dick Parry – tenor saxophone

Production:

- David Gilmour – producer
- James Guthrie – engineer

== Chart history ==
=== Weekly charts ===
Chart (1973)	Peak position
Canada RPM 100 Singles	18
Austria	10
Germany	49
Italy (Musica e Dischi)	15
Spain (AFE)	10
US Billboard Hot 100	13
US Cash Box Top 100	10
Chart (1981)	Peak position
US Billboard Top Tracks	37

=== Year-end charts ===
Chart (1973)	Rank
Canada	157
US (Joel Whitburn's Pop Annual)	111
US Opus	91
US Cash Box	85
US Billboard Hot 100	92

== Certifications ==
Region	Certification	Certified units/sales
Denmark (IFPI Danmark)	Gold	45,000^{‡}
Italy (FIMI) sales since 2009	Platinum	50,000^{‡}
New Zealand (RMNZ)	2× Platinum	60,000^{‡}
Spain (Promusicae)	Gold	30,000^{‡}
United Kingdom (BPI) sales since 2005	Platinum	600,000^{‡}
^{‡} Sales+streaming figures based on certification alone.

== Roger Waters version ==
"Money"

Single by Roger Waters

from the album The Dark Side of the Moon Redux
- Released: 21 July 2023
- Genre: Art rock; Symphonic rock; Blues rock; Jazz; Spoken word
- Length: 7:33
- Label: Cooking Vinyl
- Songwriter: Waters
- Producers: Waters; Gus Seyffert

Roger Waters singles chronology
"Comfortably Numb 2022" (2022)	"Money" (2023)	"Time" (2023)

Music video
- "Money" on YouTube

In early 2023, Roger Waters announced that, to mark the 50th anniversary of The Dark Side of the Moon, he would be releasing a complete re-recording of the album without the involvement of the other members of Pink Floyd. This new version would aim to reinterpret and re-emphasise the political and emotional themes of the original. The album, titled The Dark Side of the Moon Redux, was previewed by the release of its lead single, a reimagined version of "Money", on 21 July 2023. A lyric video for the track was released simultaneously.

Unlike the original version, Waters' re-recording of "Money" has been described as "eerie", featuring ominous, near-whispered and crooned vocals. It is also notably slower than the original recording and includes a spoken word segment in the middle, which has been said to "add to the surrealism". The track has been characterised as more blues-influenced than rock-oriented, and has drawn comparisons to the work of Leonard Cohen.

=== Personnel ===
- Roger Waters – vocals
- Gus Seyffert – bass, guitar, percussion, keys, synth, backing vocals
- Joey Waronker – drums, percussion
- Jonathan Wilson – guitars, synth, organ
- Johnny Shepherd – organ, piano
- Via Mardot – theremin
- Azniv Korkejian – vocals
- Gabe Noel – string arrangements, strings, sarangi
- Jon Carin – keyboards, lap steel, synth, organ
