= Animals 50 =

- Digital cover

Box set by Pink Floyd
- Released: 22 January 2027
- Recorded: April–December 1976 (studio); 9 May 1977 (Live from the Oakland Coliseum Arena)
- Venues: Oakland Coliseum Arena, Oakland, California
- Studios: Britannia Row, London
- Genre: Progressive rock
- Length: 260:29
- Labels: Pink Floyd Music Ltd.; Sony

Pink Floyd chronology
8-Tracks (2026)	Animals 50 (2027)

Singles from Animals 50
- 1. "Sheep (Original Radio Edit)" Released: 5 November 2026

Animals 50 is a 50th anniversary box set reissue of English progressive rock band Pink Floyd's original 1977 album. It will be released on 22 January 2027 via Sony Music. It is the third in a series of 50th anniversary box sets, preceded by The Dark Side of the Moon 50th Anniversary and Wish You Were Here 50. A digital single was released to support the box set

== Contents ==
The box set will be released in a digital, 1LP, 2LP, 3LP, blu-ray, and deluxe format. The base digital format contains the original record and 2018 remix, a rarities disc, and a live performance from the In the Flesh tour at Oakland Coliseum Arena, which features both a full performance of Animals as well a full performance of Wish You Were Here, "Money", "Us and Them", and "Careful with That Axe, Eugene." The performance was recorded by bootlegger Reinhard Howlein. A 64-page book containing excerpts and notes from Jonathan Lethem and Aubrey Powell will also be included. The original promo radio edit of "Sheep" had remained unreleased prior to the box set and its single release on 5 November 2026. The blu-ray issue of the box set will also contain a stereo, Dolby Atmos, and 5.1 surround sound remix of the record.

== Track listing ==
=== Digital track listing ===
All tracks are written by Roger Waters, except where noted.

Disc 1 – Animals (1977)
No.	Title	Music	Length
1.	"Pigs on the Wing 1"		1:24
2.	"Dogs"	Waters; David Gilmour	17:04
3.	"Pigs (Three Different Ones)"		11:28
4.	"Sheep"		10:20
5.	"Pigs on the Wing 2"		1:24
Total length:			41:40

Disc 2 – Animals (2018 remix)
No.	Title	Music	Length
1.	"Pigs on the Wing 1"		1:24
2.	"Dogs"	Waters; Gilmour	17:04
3.	"Pigs (Three Different Ones)"		11:28
4.	"Sheep"		10:20
5.	"Pigs on the Wing 2"		1:24
Total length:			41:40

Disc 3 – Rarities
No.	Title	Music	Length
1.	"Dogs" (Early Version Rough Mix) (previously unreleased)	Waters; Gilmour	17:48
2.	"Sheep" (Original Radio Edit) (previously unreleased)		4:23
3.	"Sheep" (Early Version Rough Mix) (previously unreleased)		11:41
4.	"Jam #1" (previously unreleased)	Waters; Gilmour; Richard Wright	2:53
5.	"Young Nicholas Jon" (previously unreleased)		1:19
Total length:			38:04

Disc 4 – Live from the Oakland Coliseum Arena, 1977 (digital only)
No.	Title	Music	Length
1.	"Sheep"		11:23
2.	"Pigs on the Wing 1"		2:17
3.	"Dogs"	Waters; Gilmour	18:46
4.	"Pigs on the Wing 2"		2:34
5.	"Pigs (Three Different Ones)"		17:33
6.	"Shine On You Crazy Diamond" (Pts. 1–5)	Gilmour; Wright; Waters	13:54
7.	"Welcome to the Machine"		8:09
8.	"Have a Cigar"		6:06
9.	"Wish You Were Here"	Waters; Gilmour	6:55
10.	"Shine On You Crazy Diamond" (Pts. 6–9)	Gilmour; Wright; Waters (Parts 6–8); Wright (Part 9)	21:57
11.	"Money"		10:52
12.	"Us and Them"	Wright	8:28
13.	"Careful with That Axe, Eugene"	Gilmour; Waters; Wright; Nick Mason	10:19
Total length:			139:05

=== Deluxe track listing ===
==== Blu-ray ====
- Animals (1977 Original stereo mix)
- Animals (2018 Original stereo mix)
- Animals (2018 5.1 surround sound mix)
- Animals (2018 Dolby Atmos mix)
- Rarities
- Live from the Oakland Coliseum Arena, 1977
