= Live from the Los Angeles Sports Arena, April 26th, 1975 =

Live album and box set by Pink Floyd
- Released: 18 April 2026
- Recorded: 26 April 1975
- Venues: Los Angeles Sports Arena, Los Angeles
- Length: 2:13:48
- Label: Sony Music
- Producer: Steven Wilson

Pink Floyd chronology
Wish You Were Here 50 (2025)	Live from the Los Angeles Sports Arena, April 26th, 1975 (2026)	8-Tracks (2026)

Live from the Los Angeles Sports Arena, April 26th, 1975 is a four disc live album box set by the English rock band Pink Floyd, released on 18 April 2026 as Pink Floyd's contribution to Record Store Day 2026.

== Background and production ==
On 26 April 1975, Pink Floyd performed at the Los Angeles Sports Arena, as part of their Wish You Were Here Tour. The band performed two sets for the tour. The first set included songs from Wish You Were Here (1975) and early versions of songs from Animals (1977) under working titles. The second set consisted of The Dark Side of the Moon (1973) in its entirety, with "Echoes" performed as an encore.

The performance was recorded by Mike "The Mic" Millard, a bootlegger who would often sneak his recording equipment into concerts, and released as an unauthorized bootleg recording. It was later remastered by Steven Wilson, and is generally believed to be the best possible audio documentation of the show. The show was originally included on Wish You Were Here 50, a 2025 box set reissue of Wish You Were Here. It was the most sold Record Store Day 2026 release, beating out Bruno Mars's Collaborations.

== Critical reception ==
Professional ratings
Review scores
Source	Rating
All About Jazz	4.5/5 stars
AllMusic	3.5/5 stars

In a review for All About Jazz, Doug Collette states that "Throughout, [...] the musicians are precise and purposeful, though as is their wont, not particularly spontaneous to complement sound effects and video display.", he concludes by writing that "at this juncture, some half-a-century-plus after the fact, retrospect allows Live from the Los Angeles Sports Arena, April 26th, 1975 to become the means of rediscovering Pink Floyd in the midst of what is arguably the most cogent creative expression of its career."

== Track listing ==
=== Vinyl edition ===
Side A
No.	Title	Writer(s)	Length
1.	"Raving and Drooling"	Roger Waters	11:47

Side B
No.	Title	Writer(s)	Length
2.	"You've Got to Be Crazy"	Waters; David Gilmour	13:23

Side C
No.	Title	Writer(s)	Length
3.	"Shine On You Crazy Diamond" (Pts. 1–5)	Waters; Gilmour; Richard Wright	12:43
4.	"Have a Cigar"	Waters	4:47

Side D
No.	Title	Writer(s)	Length
5.	"Shine On You Crazy Diamond" (Pts. 6–9)	Waters; Gilmour; Wright	13:24

Side E
No.	Title	Writer(s)	Length
6.	"Speak to Me"	Nick Mason	5:17
7.	"Breathe (In the Air)"	Waters; Gilmour; Wright	2:48
8.	"On the Run"	Waters; Gilmour	4:49
9.	"Time"	Mason; Waters; Wright; Gilmour	6:10

Side F
No.	Title	Writer(s)	Length
10.	"The Great Gig in the Sky"	Wright	6:07
11.	"Money"	Waters	8:01
12.	"Us and Them"	Waters; Wright	7:53

Side G
No.	Title	Writer(s)	Length
13.	"Any Colour You Like"	Gilmour; Mason; Wright	8:35
14.	"Brain Damage"	Waters	3:37
15.	"Eclipse"	Waters	2:13

Side H
No.	Title	Writer(s)	Length
16.	"Echoes"	Waters; Wright; Mason; Gilmour	22:36

- On 2CD releases, disc 1 comprises sides A to D, while disc 2 comprises sides E to H.

== Personnel ==
According to the liner notes of the set:

Pink Floyd

- David Gilmour – guitar, vocals
- Roger Waters – bass, vocals
- Richard Wright – keyboards
- Nick Mason – drums, vocals

Additional musicians

- Dick Parry – saxophone on "Raving and Drooling", "Money", "Us and Them", and "Echoes"
- Venetta Fields – backing vocals
- Carlena Williams – backing vocals

== Charts ==
Weekly chart performance for Live from the Los Angeles Sports Arena, April 26th, 1975
Chart (2026)	Peak position
Australian Albums (ARIA)	43
Austrian Albums (Ö3 Austria)	8
Belgian Albums (Ultratop Flanders)	30
Belgian Albums (Ultratop Wallonia)	10
French Albums (SNEP)	100
German Albums (Offizielle Top 100)	7
Italian Albums (FIMI)	23
Dutch Albums (Album Top 100)	30
Scottish Albums (Official Charts)	3
Spanish Albums (Promusicae)	86
Swiss Albums (Schweizer Hitparade)	3
UK Albums (Official Charts)	46
US Billboard 200	82
US Top Rock Albums (Billboard)	13
US Vinyl Albums (Billboard)	4
