= Wish You Were Here 50 =

Box set by Pink Floyd
- Released: 12 December 2025
- Recorded: 13 January – 28 July 1975 (studio); 15–16 November 1974 (Live at the Empire Pool); 1975 (Live at the Los Angeles Sports Arena)
- Venues: Wembley Stadium, London; Los Angeles Sports Arena, Los Angeles
- Studios: EMI, London
- Length: 258:36
- Labels: Pink Floyd Music Ltd.; Columbia; Sony
- Producer: Pink Floyd

Pink Floyd chronology
The Dark Side of the Moon 50th Anniversary (2025)	Wish You Were Here 50 (2025)	Live from the Los Angeles Sports Arena, April 26th, 1975 (2026)

Singles from Wish You Were Here 50
- 1. "The Machine Song (Demo #2, Revisited)" Released: 12 September 2025; 2. "Shine On You Crazy Diamond (Pts. 1-9, New Stereo Mix)" Released: 18 November 2025

Wish You Were Here 50 is a 50th anniversary box set reissue of English progressive rock band Pink Floyd's original 1975 album. It was released on 12 December 2025 by Sony Music. Two digital singles were released to support the box set.

== Contents ==
The box set contains two CDs and four LPs. The first three LPs and the two CDs feature the original 1975 record alongside nine additional tracks of rarities, such as alternate versions and demos. Furthermore, the digital release of the set also contains a bootleg 1975 live performance at the Los Angeles Sports Arena remastered by Steven Wilson. Moreover, the set also contains a Blu-ray featuring the 1975 album in Dolby Atmos, 5.1 surround sound, among other things by James Guthrie, and the Los Angeles Sports Arena Performance. A hardcover book with photographs, a comic book tour programme and a Knebworth poster is also contained in the set. The deluxe box set contains additional material, including a fourth LP containing two live tracks from the band's performance at the Wembley Stadium in 1974 and, similar to the Dark Side of the Moon box set containing replica 7" singles, a replica of the Japanese-exclusive single "Have a Cigar"/"Welcome to the Machine". The new cover art was done by Aubrey Powell of Hipgnosis and Peter Curzon of Stormstudios.

== Track listing ==
=== CD track listing ===
Disc 1 – Wish You Were Here and bonus tracks
No.	Title	Music	Length
1.	"Shine On You Crazy Diamond (Parts 1–5)"	David Gilmour; Richard Wright; Roger Waters	13:34
2.	"Welcome to the Machine"	Waters	7:30
3.	"Have a Cigar"	Waters	5:07
4.	"Wish You Were Here"	Waters; Gilmour	5:38
5.	"Shine On You Crazy Diamond (Parts 6–9)"	Gilmour; Wright; Waters (Parts 6–8) Wright (Part 9)	12:25
6.	"Wine Glasses"	Gilmour; Wright; Waters	2:11
7.	"Have a Cigar (Alternate Version)"	Waters	7:10
8.	"Wish You Were Here" (featuring Stéphane Grappelli)	Waters; Gilmour	6:10

Disc 2 – bonus tracks continued
No.	Title	Length
1.	"Shine On You Crazy Diamond (Early Instrumental Version, Rough Mix) (previously unreleased)"	18:53
2.	"The Machine Song (Roger's Demo) (previously unreleased)"	4:11
3.	"The Machine Song (Demo #2, Revisited) (previously unreleased)"	5:31
4.	"Wish You Were Here (Take 1) (previously unreleased)"	5:00
5.	"Wish You Were Here (Pedal Steel Instrumental Mix) (previously unreleased)"	6:01
6.	"Shine On You Crazy Diamond (Parts 1–9, New Stereo Mix) (previously unreleased)"	25:38

Disc 3 – Live Bootleg from the Los Angeles Sports Arena, 1975 (digital only)
No.	Title	Length
1.	"Raving and Drooling"	12:33
2.	"You've Got to Be Crazy"	13:49
3.	"Shine On You Crazy Diamond (Pts. 1-5)"	12:36
4.	"Have a Cigar"	4:36
5.	"Shine On You Crazy Diamond (Pts. 6-9)"	13:32
6.	"Speak to Me"	3:17
7.	"Breathe (In the Air)"	2:59
8.	"On the Run"	4:32
9.	"Time"	6:30
10.	"The Great Gig in the Sky"	6:08
11.	"Money"	8:07
12.	"Us and Them"	7:53
13.	"Any Colour You Like"	8:31
14.	"Brain Damage"	3:38
15.	"Eclipse"	2:40
16.	"Echoes"	22:26
Total length:		258:36

=== Deluxe track listing ===
==== Blu-ray ====
- Wish You Were Here album:
  - 1975 Original stereo mix (LPCM)
  - 1976 Quadrophonic mix
  - 2011 5.1 surround sound mix
  - 2025 Dolby Atmos mix
- Live Bootleg from the Los Angeles Sports Arena, 1975 (stereo only)
- Bonus tracks (stereo only)
- Videos:
  - Shine On You Crazy Diamond (Part 1) screen film
  - Shine On You Crazy Diamond screen film
  - Welcome to the Machine screen film
  - Storm Thorgerson animation

LP4 – Live at the Empire Pool
No.	Title	Length
1.	"Shine on You Crazy Diamond"
2.	"You’ve Got To Be Crazy"

"Have a Cigar"/"Welcome to the Machine" 7" Single

Side 1
No.	Title	Length
1.	"Have a Cigar (edit)"

Side 2
No.	Title	Length
1.	"Welcome to the Machine"
