= 8-Tracks =

Compilation album by Pink Floyd
- Released: 5 June 2026
- Recorded: 1971–1979
- Genre: Progressive rock
- Length: 43:20
- Label: Sony Music

Pink Floyd chronology
| Live from the Los Angeles Sports Arena, April 26th, 1975 (2026) | 8-Tracks (2026) | Animals 50 (2027) |

8-Tracks is a compilation album by English progressive rock band Pink Floyd, featuring eight tracks spanning from Meddle (1971) to The Wall (1979). It features new transitions in between each song, as well as a complete version of the track "Pigs on the Wing", edited by Steven Wilson with new sound effects sourced from the original multitracks, previously only available on the 8-track cartridge of Animals (1977). It was released on 5 June 2026 via Sony Music.

== Track listing ==
8-Tracks track listing
| No. | Title | Album | Length |
|---|---|---|---|
| 1. | "One of These Days" | Meddle (1971) | 5:38 |
| 2. | "Wot's... Uh the Deal?" | Obscured by Clouds (1972) | 4:55 |
| 3. | "Money" | The Dark Side of the Moon (1973) | 6:34 |
| 4. | "Another Brick in the Wall, Part 2" | A Collection of Great Dance Songs (1981) | 3:54 |
| 5. | "Wish You Were Here" | Wish You Were Here (1975) | 5:22 |
| 6. | "Time" | The Dark Side of the Moon (1973) | 7:02 |
| 7. | "Comfortably Numb" | The Wall (1979) | 6:17 |
| 8. | "Pigs on the Wing" | Animals (8-track version) (1977) | 3:34 |
| Total length: | | | 43:20 |

== Charts ==
Chart performance for 8-Tracks
| Chart (2026) | Peak position |
|---|---|
| Australian Albums (ARIA) | 22 |
| Austrian Albums (Ö3 Austria) | 14 |
| Belgian Albums (Ultratop Flanders) | 14 |
| Belgian Albums (Ultratop Wallonia) | 3 |
| Canadian Albums (Billboard) | 68 |
| Croatian International Albums (HDU) | 16 |
| Danish Albums (Hitlisten) | 37 |
| Dutch Albums (Album Top 100) | 45 |
| Finnish Albums (Suomen virallinen lista) | 48 |
| French Albums (SNEP) | 29 |
| French Rock & Metal Albums (SNEP) | 2 |
| German Albums (Offizielle Top 100) | 7 |
| German Rock & Metal Albums (Offizielle Top 100) | 3 |
| Hungarian Physical Albums (MAHASZ) | 7 |
| Irish Albums (IRMA) | 68 |
| Italian Albums (FIMI) | 9 |
| Japanese Albums (Oricon) | 21 |
| Japanese Rock Albums (Oricon) | 3 |
| Japanese Top Albums Sales (Billboard Japan) | 19 |
| New Zealand Albums (RMNZ) | 18 |
| Norwegian Albums (IFPI Norge) | 27 |
| Norwegian Rock Albums (IFPI Norge) | 2 |
| Polish Albums (ZPAV) | 9 |
| Portuguese Albums (AFP) | 123 |
| Scottish Albums (Official Charts) | 5 |
| Swedish Physical Albums (Sverigetopplistan) | 10 |
| Swiss Albums (Schweizer Hitparade) | 5 |
| UK Albums (Official Charts) | 17 |
| UK Rock & Metal Albums (Official Charts) | 2 |
| US Billboard 200 | 86 |
| US Top Rock & Alternative Albums (Billboard) | 22 |
