= Wish You Were Here Tour =

1975 concert tour by Pink Floyd

- Tour by Pink Floyd
- Poster to the concert in Atlanta, USA
- Location: England; North America
- Associated album: Wish You Were Here; Animals; The Dark Side of the Moon
- Start date: 8 April 1975
- End date: 5 July 1975
- Legs: 3
- No. of shows: 29

Pink Floyd concert chronology
- 1974 tours (1974); Wish You Were Here Tour (1975); In the Flesh Tour (1977)

The North American Tour, also referred to as the Wish You Were Here Tour, was a concert tour by the English progressive rock band Pink Floyd in 1975 in support of their then-forthcoming album Wish You Were Here. The tour was divided in two legs in the United States, West Coast and East Coast, and a gig in the UK at the Knebworth Festival.

On this tour the band debuted the song "Have a Cigar", and the "Shine On You Crazy Diamond" suite was divided in two parts with "Have a Cigar" between. The other two songs from Wish You Were Here (the title track and "Welcome to the Machine") wouldn't be played live until their In the Flesh concert series of 1977.

The last gig of the tour was as the headliner of 1975 Knebworth Festival, which also featured Steve Miller Band, Captain Beefheart and Roy Harper (who joined Pink Floyd on the stage to sing "Have a Cigar"). Knebworth was the last time the band would perform "Echoes" and the entire The Dark Side of the Moon album with Roger Waters. In 2026, a recording of a concert was released as the live album Live from the Los Angeles Sports Arena, April 26th, 1975.

== Setlist ==
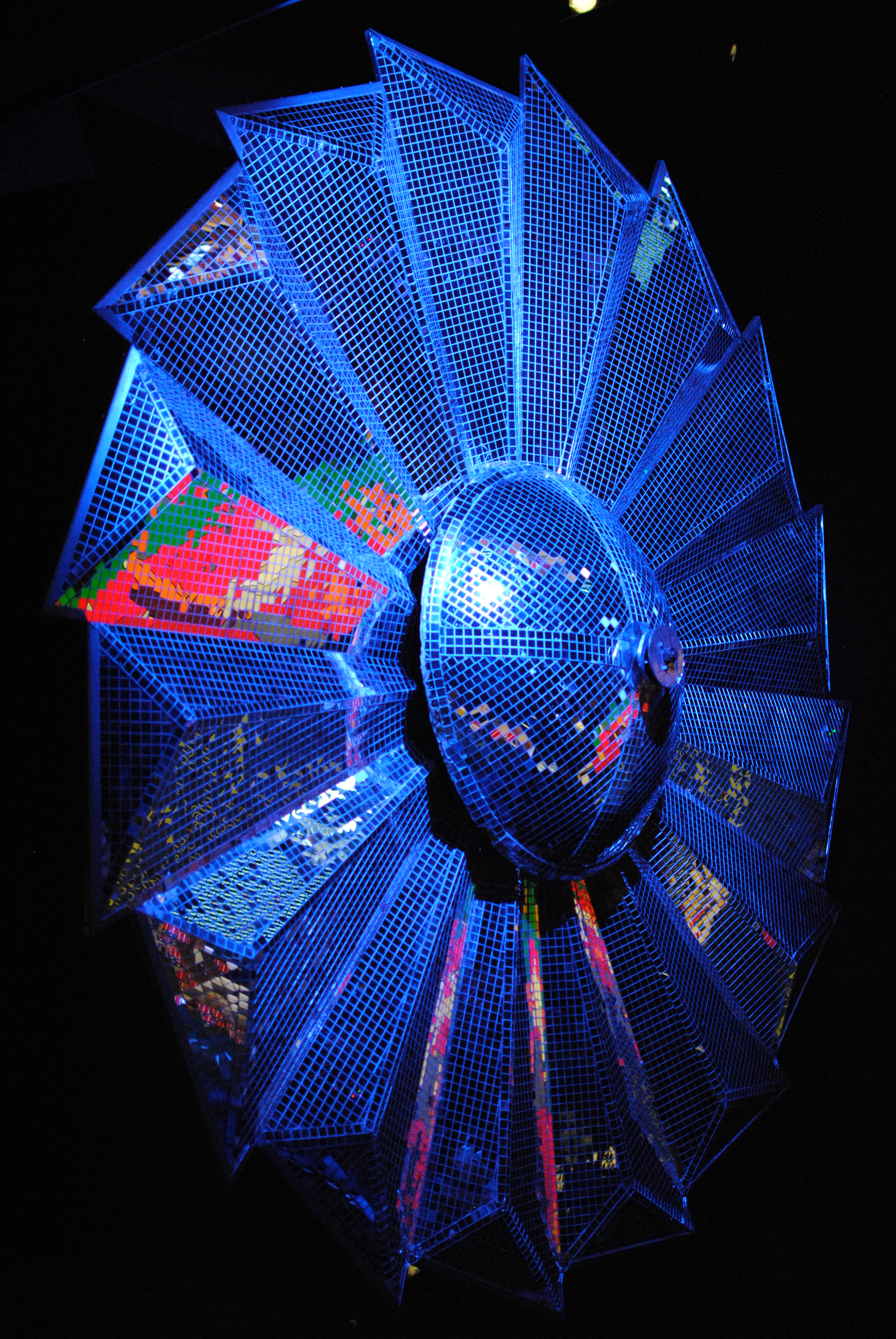
Rotating flower-petal mirror ball, used to reflect spotlights during concerts from 1975 to 1977; displayed at the Pink Floyd: Their Mortal Remains exhibition

The band performed two sets for the tour. The first set included songs from Wish You Were Here and early versions of songs from Animals under working titles. The second set consisted of the entire The Dark Side of the Moon album with "Echoes" performed as an encore.

First set

1. "Raving and Drooling"
2. "You've Got to Be Crazy"
3. "Shine On You Crazy Diamond, Parts I-V"
4. "Have a Cigar"
5. "Shine On You Crazy Diamond, Parts VI-IX"

Second set: The Dark Side of the Moon

6. "Speak to Me"
7. "Breathe"
8. "On the Run"
9. "Time / Breathe (Reprise)"
10. "The Great Gig in the Sky"
11. "Money"
12. "Us and Them"
13. "Any Colour You Like"
14. "Brain Damage"
15. "Eclipse"

Encore

16. "Echoes"

== Tour dates ==
List of 1975 concerts showing date, city, country and venue
Date	City	Country	Venue
8 April	Vancouver	Canada	Pacific Coliseum
10 April	Seattle	United States	Seattle Center Coliseum
12 April	Daly City	United States	Cow Palace
13 April	Daly City	United States	Cow Palace
17 April	Denver	United States	Denver Coliseum
19 April	Tucson	United States	Tucson Convention Center
20 April	Tempe	United States	ASU Activity Center
21 April	San Diego	United States	San Diego Sports Arena
23 April	Los Angeles	United States	Los Angeles Sports Arena
24 April	Los Angeles	United States	Los Angeles Sports Arena
25 April	Los Angeles	United States	Los Angeles Sports Arena
26 April	Los Angeles	United States	Los Angeles Sports Arena
27 April	Los Angeles	United States	Los Angeles Sports Arena
7 June	Atlanta	United States	Atlanta Stadium
9 June	Landover	United States	Capital Centre
10 June	Landover	United States	Capital Centre
12 June	Philadelphia	United States	The Spectrum
13 June	Philadelphia	United States	The Spectrum
14 June	Jersey City	United States	Roosevelt Stadium
16 June	Uniondale	United States	Nassau Coliseum
17 June	Uniondale	United States	Nassau Coliseum
18 June	Boston	United States	Boston Garden
20 June	Pittsburgh	United States	Three Rivers Stadium
22 June	Milwaukee	United States	Milwaukee County Stadium
23 June	Detroit	United States	Olympia Stadium
24 June	Detroit	United States	Olympia Stadium
26 June	Montreal	Canada	Autostade
28 June	Hamilton	Canada	Ivor Wynne Stadium
5 July (Note: The concert in Stevenage on 5 July 1975 was part of the Knebworth Festival.)	Stevenage	England	Knebworth Park

== Personnel ==
Pink Floyd

- David Gilmour – vocals, guitar
- Roger Waters – bass, vocals
- Richard Wright – keyboards, vocals
- Nick Mason – drums

Additional musicians

- Dick Parry – saxophone
- The Blackberries (Venetta Fields & Carlena Williams) – backing vocals
