= Pigs (Three Different Ones) =

- Brazil promotional single

Promotional single by Pink Floyd

from the album Animals
- Released: 23 January 1977
- Recorded: April–May 1976
- Genre: Progressive rock; blues rock; hard rock; experimental rock
- Length: 4:03 (single version); 11:28 (album version)
- Label: Harvest (UK); Columbia/CBS (US)
- Songwriter: Roger Waters
- Producer: Pink Floyd

"Pigs (Three Different Ones)" is a song from Pink Floyd's tenth studio album Animals (1977). In the album's three parts, "Dogs", "Pigs" and "Sheep", pigs represent the people whom the band considers to be at the top of the social ladder, the ones with wealth and power; they also manipulate the rest of society and encourage them to be viciously competitive and cut-throat, so the pigs can remain powerful.

== Summary ==
"Pigs (Three Different Ones)"
The "Pigs" on Animals represent the people whom Waters viewed as being at the top of the social ladder

The song's three verses each present a different "pig". According to Waters, the first verse's "pig man" refers to businessmen in general, whereas the second verse refers to conservative politician Margaret Thatcher, leader of the opposition at that time. The third verse clearly identifies its subject as being morality campaigner Mary Whitehouse, who is described as a "house proud town mouse" who has to "keep it all on the inside." In 1992, on the Westwood One radio special Pink Floyd: The 25th Anniversary Special, Waters told Jim Ladd that the "Whitehouse" mentioned had nothing to do with the home of the US president, the White House, after Ladd told Waters he interpreted the last verse as referring to Gerald Ford, who was US president at the time the song was recorded (although the verse also includes Whitehouse's first name).

Halfway through the song, David Gilmour uses a Heil talk box on the guitar solo to mimic the sound of pigs. This is the first use of a talk box by Pink Floyd. Gilmour also plays bass guitar with a pick, doing two short, syncopated bass solos—one before the first verse, another before the third. When the final verse ends and a guitar solo emerges, the bass line moves into a driving eighth note rhythm, sliding up and down the E minor scale in octaves, beneath the chords of E minor and C major seventh. Roger Waters, usually the band's bassist, played a rhythm guitar track on the song instead.

The song was released as a promotional single in Brazil, albeit in an edited form of only four minutes and five seconds in length. On some cassette tape versions of Animals, the song was divided into two parts, with the first verse fading out on side one and fading back in on side two, in order to minimize the total length of tape.

== Live versions ==
The normal length of the song performed live was roughly 17 minutes (some would top out at 20 minutes), compared with the album length of 11 minutes and 28 seconds. Live renditions basically followed the album version with a few notable differences: an extra guitar solo was played after the second verse, the talk-box solo on guitar was substituted with a Minimoog solo and to the coda were added a quiet Hammond-led section and a crescendo reprise of the guitar solo with aggressive drumming. Waters, who sang on both the studio and live versions of "Pigs (Three Different Ones)", also added his signature screams throughout live performances of this song during the 1977 tour.

While playing on the 1977 tour, Waters shouted a different number for each concert. This purportedly had the purpose of identifying bootleg recordings. Also, Snowy White would play bass guitar while Waters played rhythm electric guitar with his black with white pickguard Fender Stratocaster.

In 1987, on tour to promote his solo album Radio K.A.O.S., Waters performed a shortened version of the song, featuring only the first two verses and shorter guitar solos between them as part of an extended Pink Floyd medley. Waters played Gilmour's original bass parts rather than rhythm guitar, and would do so again on all subsequent live performances.

Waters would not play the song live again until 2016, on a brief tour of the US and Mexico. These performances were almost identical to the studio version and were accompanied by a large amount of anti-Donald Trump imagery, including caricatures, displays of controversial quotes by Trump, and the words "Fuck Trump" (changed to "Trump Is a Pig" on some dates) displayed at the end of the song.

The song remained in Waters' setlist for his 2017 Us + Them Tour, once again being played in its entirety and with the anti-Trump images. While the response to these was mostly positive, some fans booed or even walked out during the song. Waters responded by saying, "I find it slightly surprising that anybody could have been listening to my songs for 50 years without understanding"; he added that those critics who didn't like what he was doing should "go see Katy Perry or watch the Kardashians. I don't care." Waters also said that, due to his anti-Trump images, he lost sponsors such as American Express who refused to have their company associated with his shows.

== Personnel ==
- Roger Waters – lead and harmony vocals, rhythm guitar, tape effects, vocoder
- David Gilmour – lead guitar, bass guitar, talk box, backing vocals
- Richard Wright – Hammond organ, Solina String Ensemble, grand piano, clavinet
- Nick Mason – drums, cowbell

Recording dates: April and May 1976 at Britannia Row Studios, Islington, London.
