= Pigs on the Wing =

1977 song by Pink Floyd

- Promotional French single, "Pigs on the Wing" backed with an edit of "Sheep"

Promotional single by Pink Floyd

from the album Animals
- B-side: "Sheep"
- Released: 21 January 1977
- Recorded: November 1976
- Genre: Folk rock
- Length: 2:48 (combined); 1:24 (individually); 3:26 (8-track version)
- Label: Harvest (UK); Columbia/CBS (US)
- Songwriter: Roger Waters
- Producer: Pink Floyd

"Pigs on the Wing" is a two-part song by the English rock band Pink Floyd from their 1977 concept album Animals, opening and closing the album. According to various interviews, it was written by Roger Waters as a declaration of love to his new wife Carolyne Christie. The song is significantly different from the other three songs on the album, "Dogs", "Pigs" and "Sheep", in that the other songs are dark, whereas this one is lighter-themed and much shorter, with each part at under a minute and a half while the others are all at least 10 minutes.

== Composition ==
The song is divided into two parts, which are the first and last tracks of the album. Both are in stark contrast to the album's middle three songs. Without the inclusion of this song on Animals, Waters thought the album "would have just been a kind of scream of rage."

According to Pink Floyd drummer Nick Mason, and confirmed by Waters, it is a love song directed towards Waters' new wife at the time, Carolyne. She was really the only one of Waters' friends Mason had ever met who could hold her own in an argument with Waters. According to Mason, someone had to be very good with semantics to win an argument against Waters. Waters wrote the song because that is what he had been looking for all along: someone who could stand up to him, an equal.

The songs are constructed simply and feature no instrumentation besides a strummed acoustic guitar played by Waters.

A special version of the song was made for the 8-track cartridge release. This version of the song links Part 1 and Part 2 with a guitar solo, performed by Snowy White, who would later play the guitar solo in live performances on the 1977 In the Flesh Tour. The combined version of the song, including the instrumental bridge, was re-released on White's Goldtop compilation album in 1995 and on Pink Floyd's compilation album 8-Tracks, released in 2026 with a new remaster by Steven Wilson.

== Reception ==
In a review for Animals, Brice Ezell of Consequence of Sound described "Pigs on the Wing (Part One)" as "a brief acoustic framing device. Its major key signature is a clear contrast to the frequently sinister riffs that form the landscape of 'Dogs,' 'Pigs (Three Different Ones)' and 'Sheep.'" He described "Part Two" as "a reminder that humans find ways to stick together even amidst the turmoil of a cravenly capitalist world."

== Personnel ==
- Roger Waters – acoustic guitar, lead vocals
- Snowy White – electric guitar solo (8-track version only)
- Richard Wright – Hammond organ (8-track version only)
