= In the Flesh (Pink Floyd tour) =

1977 concert tour by Pink Floyd

- Tour by Pink Floyd
- Poster with the German tour dates
- Location: Europe; North America
- Associated albums: Animals; Wish You Were Here
- Start date: 23 January 1977
- End date: 6 July 1977
- Legs: 5
- No. of shows: 55

Pink Floyd concert chronology
- Wish You Were Here Tour (1975); In the Flesh Tour (1977); The Wall Tour (1980–1981)

In the Flesh, also known as the Animals Tour, was a concert tour by the English rock band Pink Floyd, in support of their 1977 album Animals. It was divided into two legs: one in Europe and another in North America. The tour featured large inflatable puppets, as well as a pyrotechnic "waterfall", and one of the biggest and most elaborate stages to date, including umbrella-like canopies that would rise from the stage to protect the band from the elements.

This was the last tour in which Pink Floyd played songs from Animals live (early versions of "Dogs" and "Sheep" had been performed with different titles during their 1974 and 1975 tours). Pink Floyd would never again play songs from Animals during their tours, but the flying pig still appeared with different designs. Only Roger Waters would continue playing songs from Animals live. This tour was also the only tour where Pink Floyd played the entire Wish You Were Here (1975) or entire Animals (1977) and the last tour where Pink Floyd played songs from The Dark Side of the Moon with Waters.

== History ==
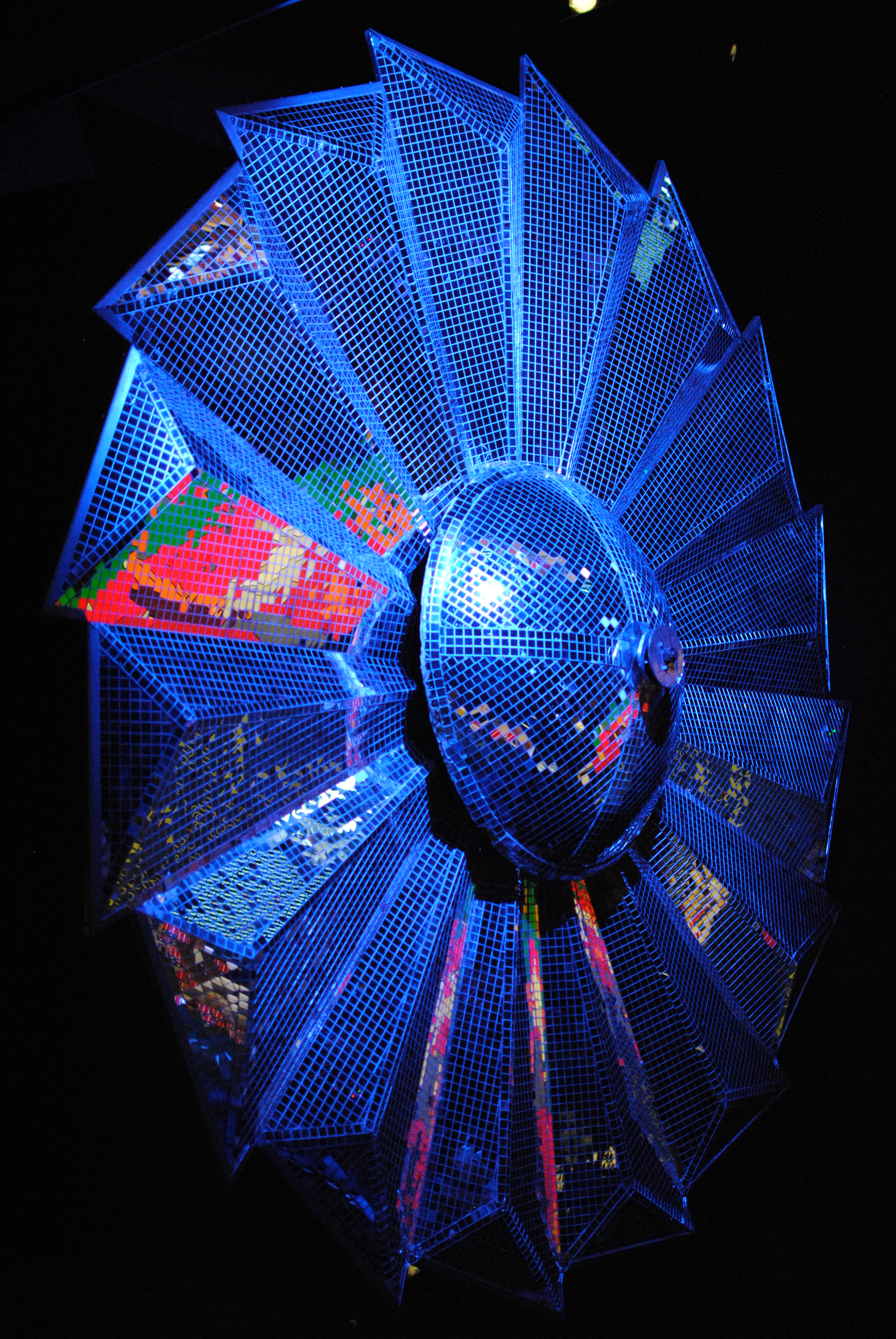
Rotating flower-petal mirror ball, used to reflect spotlights during concerts from 1975 to 1977; displayed at the Pink Floyd: Their Mortal Remains exhibition

Pink Floyd's marketing strategy for the In the Flesh Tour was aggressive, filling pages of The New York Times and Billboard magazine. To promote their four-night run at Madison Square Garden in New York City, there was a Pink Floyd parade on 6th Avenue featuring pigs and sheep. Although the Animals album had not been as commercially successful as the previous two, the band managed to sell out arenas and stadiums in North America and Europe, setting scale and attendance records. In Chicago, the band played to an estimated audience of 95,000; in Cleveland and Montreal, they set attendance records for those venues by playing to about 80,000 people. They also set an attendance record in Milwaukee, playing before a reported crowd of 60,000 at Milwaukee County Stadium.

This was Pink Floyd's first tour since 1973 not to use female backing singers. Augmenting the band were sax player Dick Parry (who occasionally played keyboards out of view of the audience) and guitarist Snowy White, who also played bass on "Sheep", "Pigs (Three Different Ones)" and "Welcome to the Machine". Roger Waters played electric guitar on "Sheep" and "Pigs (Three Different Ones)" and acoustic guitar on "Pigs on the Wing 1-2" as well as "Welcome to the Machine". David Gilmour played bass on "Pigs on the Wing Part 2" during the second and final leg of the North American tour.

In the first half of the show, the band played all of Animals in a different sequence than the album, starting with "Sheep", then "Pigs on the Wing (Part I)", "Dogs", "Pigs on the Wing (Part II)" and "Pigs (Three Different Ones)".

At some venues, paper sheep and pigs designed by Tim Hunkin were fired over the audience and parachuted back to earth. Some venues prohibited this, however.

During "Pigs (Three Different Ones)", Waters shouted the number of the concert on the tour (such as "1–5!" for the fifteenth show) so recordings of the shows would be easy to distinguish from each other. The second half of the show comprised the Wish You Were Here album in its exact running order ("Shine On You Crazy Diamond (Parts I–V)", "Welcome to the Machine", "Have a Cigar", "Wish You Were Here" and "Shine On You Crazy Diamond (Parts VI–IX)"). This was the first time "Welcome to the Machine" and "Wish You Were Here" were played live, with the latter being played differently than on the studio album. It featured an extended guitar solo, a reprise of the second verse, and Richard Wright closing the song with a piano solo. The encores were "Money" and often "Us and Them" from The Dark Side of the Moon. At the Oakland, California show on 9 May, they played "Careful with That Axe, Eugene" as a second encore, the first time it had been played since 1974 and the last time it was ever performed.

During the tour, Waters began to exhibit increasingly aggressive behaviour. He would often scold disruptive audiences who lit off fireworks or yelled and screamed during the quieter numbers. In the New York shows, the band had to use local workers as lighting technicians due to union problems with their own crew. They had several difficulties with the workers; for example, Waters once had to beckon one of the spotlights to move higher when it only illuminated his lower legs and feet while he was singing.

The final night of the tour on 6 July at Montreal's Olympic Stadium ended with Pink Floyd performing a second encore of "Drift Away Blues" as the roadies dismantled the instruments in front of the insatiable audience who refused to let the band leave the stadium. David Gilmour sat out the final encore as he was unhappy with the band's performance that night. Snowy White played a bluesy guitar solo in Gilmour's place. A small riot at the front of the stage followed the band's eventual exit. Earlier that night, Waters spat in the face of a disruptive fan; The Wall grew out of Waters' thoughts about this incident, particularly his growing awareness that stardom had alienated him from his audience. "It was a funny gig," recalled guitarist Snowy White. "It was a really weird vibe… I used to just do my job. But it was interesting to look across the stage and see Roger spitting at this guy at the front… It was a very strange gig. Not very good vibes."

== Personnel ==
Pink Floyd:

- David Gilmour – lead electric guitars (except as noted); lap steel guitar on "Shine On You Crazy Diamond, Part VI"; lead vocals on "Dogs", "Welcome To The Machine", "Wish You Were Here", "Money" and "Us And Them"; backing vocals on "Pigs (Three Different Ones)", "Shine On You Crazy Diamond", "Have A Cigar" (choruses); bass guitar on "Pigs On The Wing, Part 2"
- Roger Waters – bass guitar (except where noted); lead vocals on "Sheep", "Pigs On The Wing, Parts 1 and 2", "Dogs", "Pigs (Three Different Ones)", "Shine On You Crazy Diamond", "Have A Cigar" ; backing vocals on "Welcome To The Machine", "Wish You Were Here" (choruses) ; electric rhythm guitar on "Sheep" and "Pigs (Three Different Ones)"; acoustic guitar on "Pigs on the Wing, Parts 1 and 2" and "Welcome to the Machine"
- Richard Wright – keyboards; backing vocals on Shine On You Crazy Diamond, harmony vocals on "Dogs" ; co-lead vocals on "Us and Them" (choruses)
- Nick Mason – drums; percussion, vocoder on "Sheep"

Additional musicians:

- Snowy White – guitars (harmony lead on "Dogs", lead on "Pigs on the Wing, Part 2", "Have a Cigar", "Drift Away Blues" (6 July 1977), and "Shine On You Crazy Diamond" (link from Part VI to Part VII, dual lead on Part VIII and harmony lead Part IX), 12-string acoustic guitar on "Wish You Were Here"); backing vocals; bass guitar on "Sheep", "Pigs (Three Different Ones)" and "Welcome to the Machine".
- Dick Parry – saxophones, additional keyboards

== Tour dates ==
List of 1977 concerts showing date, city, country, venue, attendance and gross revenue
Date	City	Country	Venue	Attendance	Gross
23 January	Dortmund	West Germany	Westfalenhallen	—N/a	—N/a
24 January	Dortmund	West Germany	Westfalenhallen	—N/a	—N/a
26 January	Frankfurt	West Germany	Festhalle Frankfurt	—N/a	—N/a
27 January	Frankfurt	West Germany	Festhalle Frankfurt	—N/a	—N/a
29 January	West Berlin	West Germany	Deutschlandhalle	—N/a	—N/a
30 January	West Berlin	West Germany	Deutschlandhalle	—N/a	—N/a
1 February	Vienna	Austria	Stadthalle	—N/a	—N/a
3 February	Zürich	Switzerland	Hallenstadion	—N/a	—N/a
4 February	Zürich	Switzerland	Hallenstadion	—N/a	—N/a
17 February	Rotterdam	Netherlands	Rotterdam Ahoy	—N/a	—N/a
18 February	Rotterdam	Netherlands	Rotterdam Ahoy	—N/a	—N/a
19 February	Rotterdam	Netherlands	Rotterdam Ahoy	—N/a	—N/a
20 February	Antwerp	Belgium	Sportpaleis	—N/a	—N/a
22 February	Paris	France	Pavillon de Paris	—N/a	—N/a
23 February	Paris	France	Pavillon de Paris	—N/a	—N/a
24 February	Paris	France	Pavillon de Paris	—N/a	—N/a
25 February	Paris	France	Pavillon de Paris	—N/a	—N/a
27 February	Munich	West Germany	Olympiahalle	—N/a	—N/a
28 February	Munich	West Germany	Olympiahalle	—N/a	—N/a
1 March	Munich	West Germany	Olympiahalle	—N/a	—N/a
15 March	London	England	Empire Pool	—N/a	—N/a
16 March	London	England	Empire Pool	—N/a	—N/a
17 March	London	England	Empire Pool	—N/a	—N/a
18 March	London	England	Empire Pool	—N/a	—N/a
19 March	London	England	Empire Pool	—N/a	—N/a
28 March	Stafford	England	New Bingley Hall	—N/a	—N/a
29 March	Stafford	England	New Bingley Hall	—N/a	—N/a
30 March	Stafford	England	New Bingley Hall	—N/a	—N/a
31 March	Stafford	England	New Bingley Hall	—N/a	—N/a
22 April	Miami	United States	Miami Baseball Stadium	—N/a	—N/a
24 April	Tampa	United States	Tampa Stadium	—N/a	—N/a
26 April	Atlanta	United States	Omni Coliseum	—N/a	—N/a
28 April	Baton Rouge	United States	LSU Assembly Center	—N/a	—N/a
30 April	Houston	United States	Jeppesen Stadium	—N/a	—N/a
1 May	Fort Worth	United States	Tarrant County Convention Center	—N/a	—N/a
4 May	Phoenix	United States	Arizona Veterans Memorial Coliseum	—N/a	—N/a
6 May	Anaheim	United States	Anaheim Stadium	—N/a	—N/a
7 May	Anaheim	United States	Anaheim Stadium	—N/a	—N/a
9 May	Oakland	United States	Oakland–Alameda County Coliseum Arena	—N/a	—N/a
10 May	Oakland	United States	Oakland–Alameda County Coliseum Arena	—N/a	—N/a
12 May	Portland	United States	Memorial Coliseum	—N/a	—N/a
15 June	Milwaukee	United States	Milwaukee County Stadium	60,000 / 60,000	$540,000
17 June	Louisville	United States	Freedom Hall	—N/a	—N/a
19 June	Chicago	United States	Soldier Field	67,000 / 67,000	$670,000
21 June	Kansas City	United States	Kemper Arena	12,115 / 12,115	$120,778
23 June	Cincinnati	United States	Riverfront Coliseum	14,500/14,500	$127,425
25 June (Note: The concert in Cleveland on 25 June 1977 was part of the World Series of Rock music festival.)	Cleveland	United States	Municipal Stadium	83,199	—N/a
27 June	Boston	United States	Boston Garden		—N/a
28 June	Philadelphia	United States	Spectrum	30,500 / 30,500	$269,085
29 June	Philadelphia	United States	Spectrum	30,500 / 30,500	$269,085
1 July	New York City	United States	Madison Square Garden	58,000 / 58,000	$608,000
2 July	New York City	United States	Madison Square Garden	58,000 / 58,000	$608,000
3 July	New York City	United States	Madison Square Garden	58,000 / 58,000	$608,000
4 July	New York City	United States	Madison Square Garden	58,000 / 58,000	$608,000
6 July	Montreal	Canada	Olympic Stadium	75,000	—N/a
