= Mark Blake (writer) =

British author and music journalist

Mark Blake is a British music journalist and author. His work has been published since 1989 in The Times and The Daily Telegraph, and the music magazines Q, Mojo, Classic Rock, Music Week and Prog.

== Career ==
Mark Blake is the author of Pink Floyd: Shine On. The Definitive Oral History, published by New Modern Books in 2025 in the UK and Pegasus Books in the US, Dreams: The Many Lives Of Fleetwood Mac (2024), Us And Them: The Authorised Story Of Hipgnosis (2023), Magnifico! The A–Z Of Queen (2921), all published by Nine Eight Books, and Bring It On Home: Peter Grant, The Story Of Rock's Greatest Manager, published by Little Brown/Da Capo in the UK and US in 2018, and voted a Music Book Of The Year in The Sunday Times, The Times, Daily Mail and The Daily Telegraph.

Blake's previous books include the best-selling 2007 music biography Pigs Might Fly: The Inside Story of Pink Floyd, published by Aurum Press (available under the title Comfortably Numb: The Inside Story of Pink Floyd in the United States); Stone Me: The Wit & Wisdom Of Keith Richards, (Aurum Press, 2008); Is This The Real Life: The Untold Story of Queen (Aurum Press, 2010), and Pretend You're in a War: The Who and The Sixties, published by Aurum Press in September 2014,

Blake is a former Assistant Editor of Q, and previously edited the books Dylan: Visions, Portraits and Back Pages and Punk: The Whole Story (Dorling Kindersley, 2004 & 2005). He has also contributed to official projects for Pink Floyd, including Pink Floyd: Their Mortal Remains, the Who, Queen, Peter Gabriel, Thin Lizzy and the Jimi Hendrix estate. He is represented by Matthew Hamilton at The Hamilton Agency.

== Bibliography ==
=== Books ===
- Blake, Mark (2008). Pigs Might Fly: The Inside Story of Pink Floyd. London: Aurum. ISBN 978-1845137489.
- Blake, Mark (2010). Is This the Real Life: The Untold Story of Queen. London: Aurum. ISBN 978-0306819599.
- Blake, Mark (2014). Pretend You're in a War: The Who & The Sixties. London: Aurum. ISBN 978-1781315231.
- Blake, Mark (2018). Bring It On Home: Peter Grant, Led Zeppelin, and Beyond -- The Story of Rock's Greatest Manager. Da Capo Press. ISBN 978-0306902833.
- Blake, Mark (2024). Dreams: The Many Lives of Fleetwood Mac. Pegasus Books. ISBN 978-1639367320.

=== Articles ===
- Blake, Mark (December 2014). "The birth & death of Pink Floyd: in the beginning". Mojo. Vol. 253, no. 6. pp. 66–73.

=== Album reviews ===
| Album title | Artist | Reviewed in |
|---|---|---|
| The Endless River | Pink Floyd | Blake, Mark (December 2014). "[Untitled review]". Mojo. Vol. 253, no. 6. p. 88. |

=== Book reviews ===
| Date | Review article | Work(s) reviewed |
|---|---|---|
| 2014 | Blake, Mark (December 2014). "Bryte young thing". Books. Mojo. Vol. 253, no. 6. pp. 118–119. | Drake, Nick (2014). Gabrielle Drake (ed.). Nick Drake: remembered for a while. John Murray. |
