= Animals (Pink Floyd album) =

- Cover design by Hipgnosis

Studio album by Pink Floyd
- Released: 21 January 1977
- Recorded: April–December 1976
- Studios: Britannia Row, London
- Genre: Progressive rock
- Length: 41:40
- Labels: Harvest; Columbia
- Producer: Pink Floyd

Pink Floyd chronology
Wish You Were Here (1975)	Animals (1977)	The Wall (1979)

Animals is the tenth studio album by the English rock band Pink Floyd, released on 21 January 1977, by Harvest Records and Columbia Records. It was produced by the band at their new studio, Britannia Row Studios, in London throughout 1976. The album continued the long-form songs of Pink Floyd's previous albums, such as Meddle (1971) and Wish You Were Here (1975).

Animals is a concept album that focuses on the sociopolitical conditions of mid-1970s Britain. The cover was conceived by Roger Waters, the group's bassist and lead songwriter, and designed by long-time collaborator Storm Thorgerson. It shows an inflatable pig floating between two chimneys of Battersea Power Station.

Pink Floyd released no singles from Animals but promoted it through the In the Flesh tour. Waters' agitation with audiences during this tour inspired their next album, The Wall (1979). Animals reached number 2 in the UK and number 3 in the US. It initially received mixed reviews, but gained more favourable reviews in later years, and is considered by many to be one of Pink Floyd's greatest albums.

== Recording ==
By 1975, Pink Floyd's deal with Harvest Records' parent company, EMI, for unlimited studio time in return for a reduced percentage of sales had expired. That year, Pink Floyd bought a three-storey block of church halls at 35 Britannia Row in Islington, north London. They converted it into a recording studio and storage facility, which took up most of 1975. In April 1976, Pink Floyd started work on their tenth studio album, Animals, at the new facility. It was engineered by a previous Floyd collaborator, Brian Humphries. Recording took place at Britannia Row between April and December 1976.

With the exception of "Dogs" (co-written by David Gilmour), the tracks were written by Roger Waters. Keyboardist Richard Wright contributed less than on previous albums, and Animals was the first Pink Floyd album not to contain a writer’s credit for Wright.

"Raving and Drooling" and "You've Got to Be Crazy", songs previously performed live and considered for Pink Floyd's 1975 album Wish You Were Here, reappeared as "Sheep" and "Dogs", respectively. They were reworked to fit the new concept, and separated by "Pigs (Three Different Ones)". The only other new song, "Pigs on the Wing" (split into two parts to start and end the album), references Waters' private life; his new romantic interest was Carolyne Anne Christie, who was married to Rock Scully, the manager of the Grateful Dead, when she met Waters.

The band had discussed employing another guitarist for future tours, and Snowy White was invited into the studio. When Waters and Mason inadvertently erased one of Gilmour's guitar solos, White was asked to record a solo on "Pigs on the Wing". Although his performance was omitted from the vinyl release, it was included on the 8-track cartridge version. White performed on the Animals tour. Mason recalled enjoying working on Animals more than Wish You Were Here.

== Concept ==
Loosely based on George Orwell's political fable Animal Farm, the album's lyrics describe various classes in society as different kinds of animals: the predatory dogs, the despotic ruthless pigs, and the "mindless and unquestioning” herd of sheep. Whereas the novella focuses on Stalinism, the album is a critique of capitalism and differs again in that the sheep eventually rise up to overpower the dogs. The album was developed from a collection of unrelated songs into a concept which, in the words of author Glenn Povey, "described the apparent social and moral decay of society, likening the human condition to that of mere animals".

The album is also in part a response to the punk rock movement, which grew in popularity as a nihilistic statement against the prevailing social and political conditions, and in response to the complacency and nostalgia that appeared to surround rock music. Pink Floyd was a target for punk musicians, notably John Lydon of the Sex Pistols, who wore a Pink Floyd T-shirt on which the words "I hate" had been written in ink. Rotten since said this was a joke; he was a fan of several progressive rock bands, including Magma and Van der Graaf Generator. Mason later said he welcomed the "punk rock insurrection" as a return to the underground scene from which Pink Floyd originated. In 1977, Mason produced the Damned's second studio album, Music for Pleasure, at Britannia Row, after they failed to entice the retired Syd Barrett to the role.

"Pigs (Three Different Ones)"
The "Pigs" on Animals represent the people whom Waters viewed as being at the top of the social ladder

In his 2008 book Comfortably Numb, Mark Blake argues that "Dogs" contains some of Gilmour's finest work; although he sings only one lead vocal, his performance is "explosive". The song also contains notable contributions from Wright, which echo the synthesiser sounds used on Wish You Were Here.

"Pigs (Three Different Ones)" is similar to "Have a Cigar", with bluesy guitar fills and elaborate bass lines. Of the song's three pigs, the only one directly identified is the morality campaigner Mary Whitehouse, who is described as a "house-proud town mouse".

"Sheep" contains a modified version of Psalm 23, which continues the traditional "the Lord is my shepherd" with words like "he maketh me to hang on hooks in high places and converteth me to lamb cutlets". Towards the end of the song, the sheep rise up, kill the dogs and retire to their homes. Wright played the introduction unaccompanied on the electric piano, but did not receive a writing credit.

The album is bookended by each half of "Pigs on the Wing", a simple love song in which a glimmer of hope is offered despite the anger expressed in the other songs. Described by the author Andy Mabbett as "in stark contrast to the heavyweight material between them", the halves were influenced by Waters' relationship with his then wife.

== Packaging ==
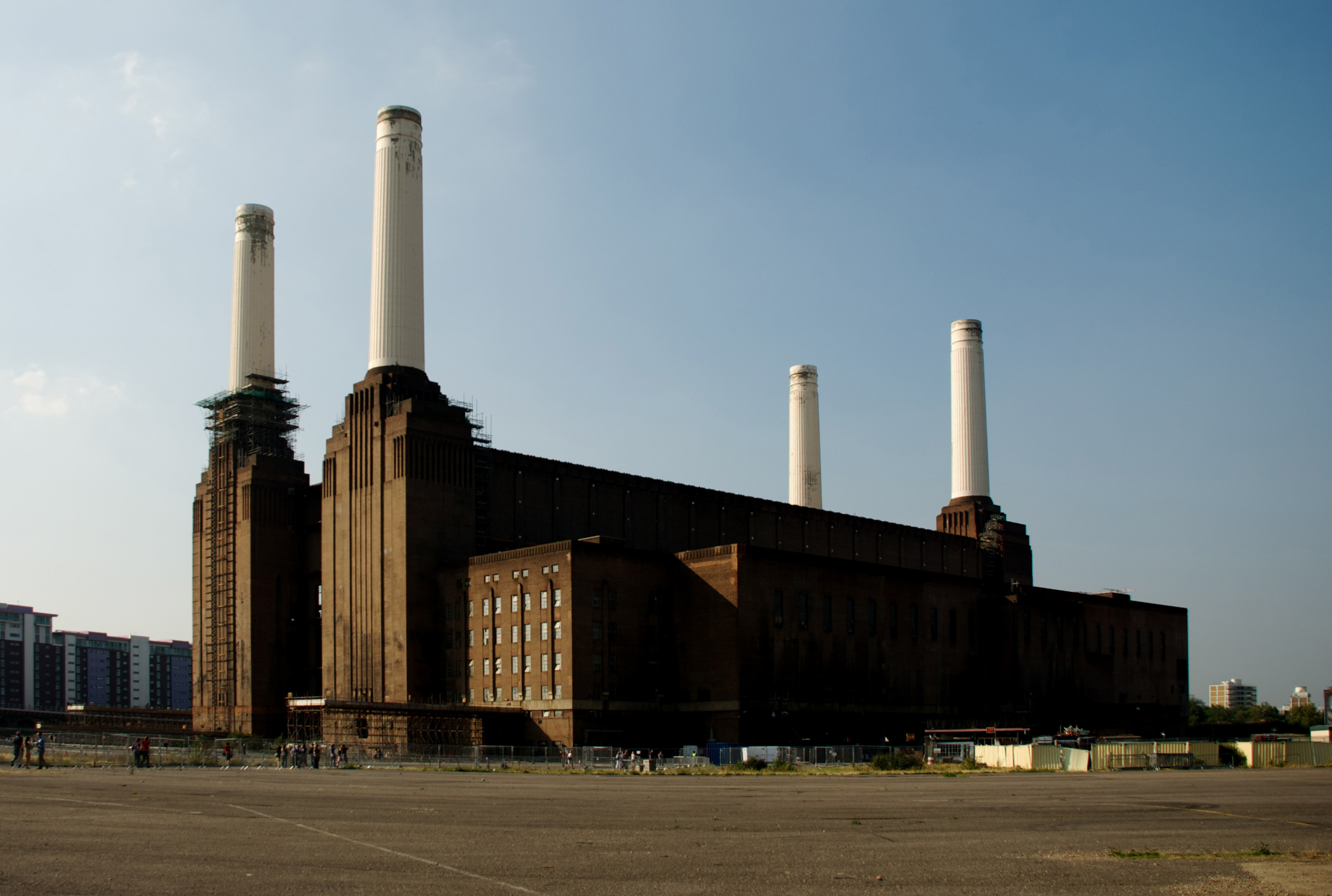
Battersea Power Station (seen here in 2008) is the subject for the album's cover image.

Once the album was complete, work began on its cover. Hipgnosis, designer of the band's previous album covers, offered three ideas, one of which was a small child entering his parents' bedroom to find them having sex: "copulating, like animals!"

The final concept was, unusually, designed by Waters. At the time, he lived near Clapham Common, London, and regularly drove past Battersea Power Station, which was approaching the end of its useful life. A view of the building was chosen for the cover image, and the band commissioned the German company Ballon Fabrik (who had previously constructed Zeppelin airships) and the Australian artist Jeffrey Shaw to build a 12-metre (40 ft) pig balloon (known as Algie). The balloon was inflated with helium and manoeuvred into position on 2 December 1976, with a marksman ready to fire if it escaped.

Inclement weather delayed work, and the band's manager Steve O'Rourke neglected to book the marksman for the following day; the balloon broke free of its moorings and disappeared from view. The pig flew over Heathrow, resulting in panic and cancelled flights; pilots also spotted the pig in the air. It eventually landed in Kent and was recovered by a local farmer, who was apparently furious that it had scared his cows. The balloon was recovered and filming continued for a third day, but as the early photographs of the power station were considered better, the image of the pig was later superimposed onto one of those taken by professional photographer Howard Bartrop on location on a residential block of flats adjacent.

During the Isles of Wonder short film shot by Danny Boyle and shown as part of the Opening Ceremonies of the 2012 Summer Olympics in London, the camera zooms down the length of the River Thames, from a small spring in the countryside all the way to the Olympic venue. During the fly-by, a pig can be seen floating above Battersea Power Station.

The album's theme continues onto the record's picture labels. Side one's label shows a fisheye lens view of a dog and the English countryside, and side two features a pig and sheep, in the same setting. Mason's handwriting is used as a typeface throughout the packaging. The gatefold features monochrome photographs of the dereliction around the power station.

== Release ==
The album's release followed Capital Radio's broadcast two days earlier of The Pink Floyd Story, and an evening press conference held at the power station two days before that. The broadcast was originally to have been an exclusive for the DJ Nicky Horne, who since mid-December had been broadcasting The Pink Floyd Story, but a copy was given to John Peel, who played side one of the album in its entirety a day earlier.

Animals was released in the UK on 21 January 1977 on Harvest Records, and in the US on 12 February on Columbia Records. It reached number two in the UK and number three in the US. According to The Guinness Book of British Hit Albums, Pink Floyd overtook ABBA for the most weeks on the UK Albums Chart in 1977, at 108 weeks. Animals was certified quadruple platinum in the US on 31 January 1995.

== Tour ==
Animals became the subject material for the band's In the Flesh Tour, which began in Dortmund on the same day the album was released. The tour continued through continental Europe in February, the UK in March, the United States for three weeks in April and May, and another three weeks in the United States in June and July. Algie became the inspiration for a number of pig themes used throughout. An inflatable pig was floated over the audience, and during each performance was replaced with a cheaper, but explosive version. On one occasion the mild propane gas was replaced with an oxygen-acetylene mixture, producing a massive (and dangerous) explosion. German promoter Marcel Avram presented the band with a piglet in Munich, only for it to leave a trail of broken mirrors and excrement across its mirrored hotel room, leaving manager O'Rourke to deal with the resulting fallout.

The band was augmented by familiar figures such as Dick Parry and Snowy White, but relations within the band became fraught. Waters took to arriving at the venues alone, departing as soon as each performance was over. On one occasion, Wright flew back to England, threatening to leave the band. The size of the venues was also an issue; in Chicago, the promoters claimed to have sold out the 67,000-person regular capacity of the Soldier Field stadium (after which ticket sales should have been ended), but Waters and O'Rourke were suspicious. They hired a helicopter, photographer and attorney, and discovered that the actual attendance was 95,000; a shortfall to the band of $640,000. The end of the tour was a low point for Gilmour, who felt that Pink Floyd had achieved the success they had sought and that there was nothing they could look forward to.

In July 1977 – on the final date at the Montreal Olympic Stadium – a small group of noisy and excited fans in the front row of the audience irritated Waters to such an extent that he spat at one of them, which he later said he immediately regretted. Gilmour also felt depressed about playing to such large audiences, and refused to join his bandmates for their third encore. Waters later spoke with the producer Bob Ezrin and told him of his sense of alienation on the tour, and how he sometimes felt like building a wall to separate himself from the audience. The incident formed the concept for the next Pink Floyd album, The Wall.

== Reception ==
Professional ratings
Retrospective reviews
Review scores
Source	Rating
AllMusic	4/5 stars
Christgau's Record Guide	B+
The Daily Telegraph	3/5 stars
The Encyclopedia of Popular Music	3/5 stars
The Great Rock Discography	8/10
MusicHound Rock	3/5 stars
Pitchfork	10/10
PopMatters	9/10
The Rolling Stone Album Guide	2/5 stars
Tom Hull – on the Web	A−

NME called Animals "one of the most extreme, relentless, harrowing and downright iconoclastic hunks of music to have been made available this side of the sun", and Melody Maker's Karl Dallas described it as an "uncomfortable taste of reality in a medium that has become in recent years, increasingly soporific". Rolling Stone's Frank Rose was unimpressed, writing: "The 1977 Floyd has turned bitter and morose. They complain about the duplicity of human behavior (and then title their songs after animals – get it?). They sound like they've just discovered this – their message has become pointless and tedious." Robert Christgau of The Village Voice gave the album a "B+" rating and found the negative reaction overly cynical, reasoning that despite its share of "obvious moments," the album functions simply as "a piece of well-constructed political program music ... lyrical, ugly, and rousing, all in the right places". Critic Mike Cormack said "Shorn of the lush textures of Dark Side or Wish You Were Here, Pink Floyd here are forbidding, stripped-down and muscular. Animals is to all intents and purposes their punk album; it has, with all deference to the Sex Pistols, a huge amount of bollocks. But it is largely undigestible by radio or compilation albums, and so it remains the lost great album of the Pink Floyd canon."

== Legacy ==
In his 2004 autobiography Inside Out, Mason wrote that the album's perceived harshness, compared to previous Floyd releases, might have been the result of a "workman-like mood in the studio", and an unconscious reaction to accusations from some punk artists that bands like Pink Floyd represented "dinosaur rock".

Gilmour said on Westwood One's Pink Floyd 25th Anniversary Special about the album: "It wasn't one of the more productive periods of our life I don't think. We used those two tracks which went back to '74, changed the names, doctored them around and stuck them on the album. I love the album; it was exciting and noisy and fun. It really had some great bits and stuff of effects on there but it was not one of our creative high points really." Wright, on the BBC Omnibus Special in 1994, said: "I didn't really like a lot of the music on the album. I didn't fight hard to put my stuff on the album and I didn't have anything to put on. I played well but did not contribute to the writing and also Roger was not letting me write. This was the whole start of the whole ego thing in the band, Animals."

=== Reissues ===
Animals was issued on CD in the UK in 1985, (Note: EMI CDP 7461282) and in the US in 1987. (Note: Columbia CK 34474) It was reissued as a digitally remastered CD with new artwork in 1994, (Note: EMI CD EMD 1060) and as a digitally remastered limited-edition vinyl album in 1997. (Note: EMI EMD 1116) An anniversary edition was released in the US in the same year, (Note: Columbia CK 68521) followed in 2000 by a reissue from Capitol Records. (Note: Capitol CDP 724382974826) It was also included in the Shine On box set in 1992, in the 2007 Oh, By The Way box set and in the 2011 Why Pink Floyd...? re-release series both in the box set and as a standalone 'Discovery' edition CD. (Note: EMI 50999 028951 2 3)

In an April 2020 interview, Waters said he had pushed for the release of a remixed and remastered vinyl of Animals by James Guthrie, but that it had been rejected by Gilmour and Mason. In June 2021, Waters released a statement announcing a new release with stereo and 5.1 surround mixes. Waters cited a dispute with Gilmour over a set of liner notes written by Mark Blake as the reason for the delay, and posted the rejected liner notes on his website. The remix was released on 16 September 2022, on vinyl, CD, & Blu-ray; a limited edition deluxe gatefold package containing the vinyl, CD, Blu-ray, and DVD copies of the remix and a 32-page book was released on 7 October 2022. A hybrid multichannel SACD of the stereo and surround remixes was released on 16 September 2022. The band released the 2018 remix of "Dogs" as a digital single on 22 July 2022. The reissue reached number 21 on the Billboard 200 (its highest position since March 1977).

Animals 50, a 50th anniversary edition, is set to be released in 22 January 2027.

== Track listing ==
All tracks are written by Roger Waters, except "Dogs", written by Waters and David Gilmour.

Side one
No.	Title	Length
1.	"Pigs on the Wing (Part One)"	1:24
2.	"Dogs"	17:04
Total length:		18:28

Side two
No.	Title	Length
1.	"Pigs (Three Different Ones)"	11:28
2.	"Sheep"	10:20
3.	"Pigs on the Wing (Part Two)"	1:24
Total length:		23:12 (41:40)

== Personnel ==
Adapted from Jean-Michel Guesdon & Philippe Margotin and the 2022 reissue's liner notes

=== Musicians ===
==== Pink Floyd ====
- Roger Waters – lead vocals (all tracks), vocal harmonies (tracks 2–3), rhythm guitar (tracks 3–4), acoustic guitar (tracks 1, 5), bass guitar (track 2), EMS VCS 3 (tracks 3–4)
- David Gilmour – lead vocals (track 2), vocal harmonies (track 2), electric lead guitar (tracks 2–4), rhythm guitar (track 2), acoustic guitar (track 2), bass guitar (tracks 3–4), sound effects (track 3), backing vocals (track 3)
- Nick Mason – drums (tracks 2–4), cowbell (track 3), vocoder (track 4)
- Richard Wright – keyboards (tracks 2–4), Hammond organ (track 3), ARP Solina (track 3), piano (track 3), Clavinet (track 3), Minimoog (track 3), EMS VCS 3 (tracks 3–4), vocal harmonies (track 2), Hammond organ (8-track version of "Pigs on the Wing")

==== Additional musicians ====
- Snowy White – guitar solo (on 8-track version of "Pigs on the Wing")

=== Production ===
- Pink Floyd – producer
- Brian Humphries – sound engineer
- Nick Griffiths – assistant sound engineer
- Doug Sax, James Guthrie – 1992 remastering at The Mastering Lab
- James Guthrie, Joel Plante – 2011 remastering at das boot recording

=== Technical ===
- Nick Mason – graphics
- Roger Waters – sleeve concept
- Storm Thorgerson – sleeve design (organiser)
- Aubrey Powell – sleeve design (organiser), photography
- Peter Christopherson – photography
- Howard Bartrop – cover photography
- Nic Tucker – photography
- Bob Ellis – photography
- Rob Brimson – photography
- Colin Jones – photography
- E.R.G. Amsterdam – inflatable pig design

== Charts ==
=== Weekly charts ===
Weekly chart performance for Animals
Chart (1977)	Peak position
Australian Albums (Kent Music Report)	3
Austrian Albums (Ö3 Austria)	2
Canada Top Albums/CDs (RPM)	12
Finnish Albums (Suomen virallinen)	9
French Albums (IFOP)	1
Dutch Albums (Album Top 100)	1
German Albums (Offizielle Top 100)	1
Italian Albums (Musica e Dischi)	1
New Zealand Albums (RMNZ)	1
Norwegian Albums (VG-lista)	2
Spanish Albums (AFE)	1
Swedish Albums (Sverigetopplistan)	3
UK Albums (Official Charts)	2
US Billboard 200	3
Chart (2006)	Peak position
Italian Albums (FIMI)	36
Chart (2010)	Peak position
Italian Albums (FIMI)	79
Chart (2011)	Peak position
Czech Albums (ČNS IFPI)	37
French Albums (SNEP)	80
Norwegian Albums (VG-lista)	37
Scottish Albums (Official Charts)	88
Swiss Albums (Schweizer Hitparade)	71
Chart (2012)	Peak position
Spanish Albums (Promusicae)	76
Chart (2016)	Peak position
Belgian Albums (Ultratop Wallonia)	89
Czech Albums (ČNS IFPI)	58
Scottish Albums (Official Charts)	88
Chart (2017)	Peak position
Czech Albums (ČNS IFPI)	51
Chart (2018)	Peak position
Czech Albums (ČNS IFPI)	59
Chart (2022)	Peak position
Australian Albums (ARIA)	27
Belgian Albums (Ultratop Flanders)	13
Belgian Albums (Ultratop Wallonia)	11
Czech Albums (ČNS IFPI)	38
Danish Albums (Hitlisten)	20
Hungarian Albums (MAHASZ)	5
Irish Albums (Official Charts)	21
Polish Albums (ZPAV)	10
Portuguese Albums (AFP)	1
Scottish Albums (Official Charts)	3
Spanish Albums (Promusicae)	16
Swiss Albums (Schweizer Hitparade)	5
UK Progressive Albums (Official Charts)	1
UK Rock & Metal Albums (Official Charts)	1
US Billboard 200	21
Chart (2025)	Peak position
Greek Albums (IFPI)	80

=== Year-end charts ===
Year-end chart performance for Animals
Chart (1977)	Position
Australia Albums (Kent Music Report)	19
Austrian Albums (Ö3 Austria)	4
Dutch Albums (Album Top 100)	15
German Albums (Offizielle Top 100)	4
New Zealand Albums (RMNZ)	23
UK Albums (OCC)	11
US Billboard 200	48

== Certifications and sales ==
Certifications and sales for Animals
Region	Certification	Certified units/sales
Austria (IFPI Austria)	Gold	25,000^{*}
Brazil	—	60,000
Canada (Music Canada)	2× Platinum	200,000^{^}
Denmark (IFPI Danmark)	Platinum	20,000^{‡}
France (SNEP)	Platinum	400,000^{*}
Germany (BVMI)	Platinum	500,000^{^}
Italy (FIMI) sales since 2009	Platinum	50,000^{‡}
Poland (ZPAV)	Gold	10,000^{‡}
United Kingdom (BPI)	Platinum	300,000^{‡}
United States (RIAA)	4× Platinum	4,000,000^{^}
^{*} Sales figures based on certification alone.^{^} Shipments figures based on certification alone.^{‡} Sales+streaming figures based on certification alone.

== See also ==
- Live Frogs Set 2
