= Welcome to the Machine =

Song by Pink Floyd

Song by Pink Floyd

from the album Wish You Were Here
- Released: 12 September 1975
- Recorded: 25 February – 28 July 1975
- Genre: Progressive rock
- Length: 7:25
- Label: Harvest (UK); Columbia/CBS (US)
- Songwriter: Roger Waters
- Producer: Pink Floyd

"Welcome to the Machine" (originally titled "The Machine Song") is the second song on Pink Floyd's 1975 album Wish You Were Here. It features heavily processed vocals, layers of synthesizers, acoustic guitars as well as a wide range of tape effects. The song was written by bassist Roger Waters.

== Recording ==
The track was built upon a basic throbbing sound made by an EMS VCS 3 followed by a one-repeat echo which Waters would have played originally on bass guitar. On the original LP, the song segued from the first 5 parts of the suite "Shine On You Crazy Diamond" and closed the first side. On the CD pressings, especially the 1997 and 2000 remastered issues, it segues (although very faintly) to "Have a Cigar". This segueing is a few seconds longer on the US version than the UK version. David Gilmour admitted that he had trouble singing one line of the song, saying, "It was a line I just couldn't reach so we dropped the tape down half a semitone." He sang the part at a slightly lower pitch, and then the tape speed was raised back to normal. Two versions of the original demo appear on the 2025 50th anniversary re-issue. "The Machine (Roger's Demo)" features an extra acoustic guitar not featured on the final version, and includes a riff used on "Have a Cigar". Another "re-visited" demo features a talkbox played by David Gilmour.

== Time signatures ==
Like many Pink Floyd songs, "Welcome to the Machine" features some variations in its metre and time signatures. Each bass "throb" of the VCS synthesizer is notated as a quarter note in the sheet music, and each note switches from one side of the stereo spread to the next. Although the introduction of the song (when the acoustic guitar enters) does not actually change time signatures, it does sustain each chord for three measures, rather than two or four, resulting in a nine-bar intro where an even number of bars might be expected.

The verses and choruses are largely in 4/4, or "common time". However, on the line "It's all right, we know where you've been", a measure of 7/4 is inserted, shortening the sequence, and causing the left-right stereo panning to be reversed for quite some time. An instrumental section begins, with the acoustic guitar adding variations in its strum pattern, until it switches to 3/4 for a length of time, when a 12-string acoustic riff is introduced, ascending up the E minor scale until the chord changes to C major seventh. Finally, the instrumental section ends, and the second verse begins. With the lyric, "It's all right, we told you what to dream", once again a measure of 7/4 is inserted, and the stereo panning is finally returned to normal. Incidentally, these two phrases beginning with "It's all right ..." are the only parts to feature any chord other than some form of E minor or C major—these phrases go to an A major chord, with its C♯ in contradiction of the frequent C chords. The song remains in 4/4 from this point forward.

== Music video ==
The music video was animated by Gerald Scarfe which was initially a backdrop film for when the band played the track on their 1977 In the Flesh tour. The fanciful video begins with what appears to be a giant mechanical Horned Toad crawling across a rocky terrain. The scene segues into a desolate industrial cityscape consisting of towering gleaming steel structures. A cylinder disturbingly cracks and oozes blood while a cuboid unfolds itself and the scene goes into girders laden with decayed corpses and rats (with one of them looking emaciated). A view of a barren landscape with a tower that extends from the horizon that morphs into a screaming unnatural form, which then stops to pant for a few seconds before viciously decapitating an unsuspecting man in the foreground. The head then very slowly decomposes to a skull as the sun sets. Finally, three buildings stand tall until an ocean of blood washes away this scene. The waves turn into thousands of hands waving in rhythm to the music (much like people at a rock concert). All of the surrounding structures are swept away except for one. Despite being pulled at by the bloody masses, the monolith survives. Synchronizing with the synthesized sound at the end of the track, it flies upwards high above the clouds into space where it fits securely into a hole in a massive floating ovoid object.

== Personnel ==
Music and lyrics by Roger Waters.

- David Gilmour – six and 12-string acoustic guitars, vocals
- Nick Mason – timpani, cymbals
- Roger Waters – bass guitar, EMS VCS 3
- Richard Wright – EMS VCS 3, Hammond organ, ARP String Ensemble, Minimoog

== Certifications ==
Region	Certification	Certified units/sales
New Zealand (RMNZ)	Gold	15,000^{‡}
^{‡} Sales+streaming figures based on certification alone.

== Live performances ==
The song was performed for the first time on Pink Floyd's 1977 In the Flesh tour. Gilmour and Waters shared lead vocals, although in initial performances, Gilmour sang on his own with some backing vocals by Waters. Also for the 1977 live performances, David Gilmour played his acoustic guitar parts on his Black Strat, Waters played an Ovation acoustic guitar, Snowy White played bass guitar, Nick Mason played his timpani parts on his drum kit with mallets, and Rick Wright handled the Mini-Moog synths and VCS3 while Dick Parry played the string synths off-stage. The live renditions of the song were complex because music had to be synchronised with the backdrop film and its sound effects. As a result, the band had to wear headphones and listen to a click-track which, in turn, meant that there was very little room left for improvisation.

Pink Floyd would play the song again on their A Momentary Lapse of Reason Tour (1987–89) where Tim Renwick played lead guitar, while Gilmour played a 12-string acoustic guitar. These renditions were not synchronised to the film.

The song was performed by Roger Waters during his 1984–85 Pros and Cons of Hitch Hiking Tour, on the 1987 Radio K.A.O.S. Tour, with Mel Collins as saxophone soloist. All of these performances were perfectly synchronised to the film. These live versions deviated significantly from the album version. It was also played on the 1999–2002 In the Flesh tour (only stills from the animation were used) and appears on the In the Flesh concert DVD and CD. Waters also performed the song on his Us + Them Tour (2017–18), in a version which resembles the album version, in which the music is yet again synchronised perfectly with the screen video.

== Studio notes ==
David Gilmour's quotes on the recording process, taken from the Wish You Were Here songbook.

The only time we've ever used tape speed to help us with vocals was on one line of the Machine song. It was a line I just couldn't reach so we dropped the tape down half a semitone and then dropped the line in on the track.

— David Gilmour, 1975, WYWH Songbook

It's very much a made-up-in-the-studio thing which was all built up from a basic throbbing made on a VCS 3, with a one repeat echo used so that each 'boom' is followed by an echo repeat to give the throb. With a number like that, you don't start off with a regular concept of group structure or anything, and there's no backing track either. Really it is just a studio proposition where we're using tape for its own ends -- a form of collage using sound.

— David Gilmour, 1975, WYWH Songbook

It's very hard to get a full synthesiser tone down on tape. If you listen to them before and after they've been recorded, you'll notice that you've lost a lot. And although I like the sound of a synthesiser through an amp, you still lose something that way as well. Eventually what we decided to do was to use D.I. on synthesiser because that way you don't increase your losses and the final result sounds very much like a synthesiser through a stage amp.

— David Gilmour, 1975, WYWH Songbook
