= Britannia Row Studios =

Recording studio in London, England

Coordinates: 51°28′04″N 0°11′26″W

Britannia Row Studios was a recording studio in Islington, London N1 (1975–1995), and then Fulham, London SW6, England (1995–2015). It was built by the English rock band Pink Floyd, who used it to record their albums Animals (1977) and The Wall (1979).

== History ==
The studio was built by the English rock band Pink Floyd in a three-story block at 35 Britannia Row, Islington, London N1, after their 1975 album Wish You Were Here was released. Pink Floyd used the studio to record their album Animals and parts of The Wall, including the school chorus on "Another Brick in the Wall".

Pink Floyd's drummer, Nick Mason, eventually assumed ownership of the studio. In the early 1990s, he sold the business to Kate Koumi, who had been managing it since the mid-1980s. Koumi relocated it in 1995 to Wandsworth Bridge Road in Fulham, where it operated for the next 20 years. It closed in September 2015 and was converted into flats.

Mason retained the building in Britannia Row, which was developed as serviced offices. In 2012 some of it, including the original studio spaces, was being used as a training facility for the London School of Sound. In 2016, Islington Council granted permission for an extension and conversion of the building into flats with limited office space.

== Britannia Row Productions ==
An audio equipment rental company, Britannia Row Productions, originally based at Britannia Row, was created to hire out Pink Floyd's tour equipment and keep the skills of its crew together. Early events that it provided sound for included Queen's 1976 show in Hyde Park, with an audience of over 150,000. Pink Floyd sold Britannia Row Productions to their managers in 1985, and it is now based in Twickenham.

== Artists ==
The studio was used by artists including:

- A Certain Ratio
- Andrew Maxwell Morris
- Richard Ashcroft
- Atomic Kitten
- Bijelo Dugme
- Björk
- Blancmange
- James Blunt
- Kate Bush
- Catherine Wheel
- Coil
- Zdravko Čolić
- The Cult
- Jack DeJohnette
- Pete Doherty
- Donovan
- Fiction Factory
- Peter Gabriel
- Paul Haig
- Roy Harper
- Human League
- Howard Jones
- Joy Division
- Ronan Keating
- Valérie Lagrange
- Liberty X
- Jon Lord
- Magazine
- Manic Street Preachers
- Michael Mantler
- Bernie Marsden
- Nick Mason
- Dannii Minogue
- Kylie Minogue
- Modern Romance
- Monty Python
- Kate Nash
- Nash the Slash
- New Order
- Sinéad O'Connor
- Page and Plant
- The Creatures
- The Motors
- The Pillows
- Pink Floyd
- Pulp
- Cozy Powell
- Section 25
- Skindred
- Snow Patrol
- Soft Cell
- Soul II Soul
- SPK
- Sugababes
- Supergrass
- Richard and Linda Thompson
- Westlife
- Whitesnake
