= Have a Cigar =

- Artwork for Belgian vinyl release

Single by Pink Floyd featuring Roy Harper

from the album Wish You Were Here
- B-side: "Welcome to the Machine" (US); "Shine On You Crazy Diamond (Part I)" (EU)
- Released: November 1975 (US)
- Recorded: 10 March – 28 July 1975
- Studio: Abbey Road, London
- Genre: Progressive rock; blues rock; funk rock
- Length: 3:30 (US promo edit); 4:24 (Spain edit); 4:50 (France edit); 5:07 (album version)
- Label: Harvest; Columbia
- Songwriter: Roger Waters
- Producer: Pink Floyd

Pink Floyd singles chronology
"Time" (1974)	"Have a Cigar" (1975)	"Another Brick in the Wall (Part 2)" (1979)

"Have a Cigar" is the third track on Pink Floyd's 1975 album Wish You Were Here. It follows "Welcome to the Machine" and on the original LP opened side two. In some markets, the song was issued as a single. English folk-rock singer Roy Harper provided lead vocals on the song. It is one of the only three Pink Floyd recordings with a guest singer on lead vocals, the others being "The Great Gig in the Sky" (1973) with Clare Torry and "Hey Hey Rise Up" (2022) with Andriy Khlyvnyuk.

The song, written by Waters, is his critique of the rampant greed and cynicism so prevalent in the management of rock groups of that era.

== Composition and recording ==
The song's music and lyrics were written by Roger Waters in critique of hypocrisy and greed within the music business. Waters has frequently implied it to be a follow-up to "Money" with the lyrics representing the demands of a record executive after the runaway success of The Dark Side of the Moon.

The song is more straightforwardly rock-oriented than the rest of the album, and is the only one on the album that starts abruptly (the other four either fade in or segue from the previous song). It begins with a churning riff played on electric guitar and bass and is filled out with additional guitar, electric piano and synthesizer parts to create a rock texture.

"Have a Cigar" concludes with a guitar solo, which is abruptly interrupted by a synthesizer filter-sweep sound effect as the music reduces in volume to tinny, AM radio-like levels. Finally, the song ends with the sound of a radio being dialled off-station; this effect is used as a transition to the title track, "Wish You Were Here".

"Have a Cigar" was a whole track on which I used the guitar and keyboards at once. There are some extra guitars which I dubbed on later, but I did the basic guitar tracks at one time.

— David Gilmour, October 1975, Interviewed by Gary Cooper in the Wish You Were Here songbook

Harper's involvement with the recording arose from the dissatisfaction that Waters and David Gilmour felt with their own attempts to sing the lead vocal line. After trying it both separately and as a duet, with Harper still technically on the track singing vocals on the bridge (available on the 2011 Experience and Immersion editions of Wish You Were Here), they turned to Harper to sing lead, who was recording his album HQ at Abbey Road at the same time as Pink Floyd. Harper agreed to sing the part as a way of repaying a favour to Gilmour, who had earlier provided him with some guitar licks ("...for a price").

In his book Pigs Might Fly: The Inside Story of Pink Floyd, author Mark Blake recounts that Gilmour had been unwilling to sing the lead vocal as he did not share Waters' opinions, as expressed in the lyrics, on the nature of the music industry. Waters has since said he dislikes Harper's version, saying he would have liked it to emerge "more vulnerable and less cynical", adding that Harper's version was too parodic. On the other hand, Gilmour loved Harper's vocal delivery and called it the "perfect version".

== Reception ==
Cash Box said that it "sounds to us like a synopsis of some of the fingerpoppers who have probably tried to capitalize off the talents of the Pink Floyd group. We were wrong, no doubt, but the music is the thing here: a cerebral message." Record World said that "These progressive pioneers mix ethereal keyboard sounds with crunchy guitar rhythms for a sound that many have attempted, but few have mastered."

== Live ==
Harper performed the song with the band on one occasion, the group's 1975 Knebworth Festival appearance, during the period Wish You Were Here was being recorded. The song was also performed on the band's 1975 North American tours sandwiched in between the multi-part "Shine On You Crazy Diamond", with Gilmour and Waters singing lead. It was last performed by the band on the 1977 In the Flesh tour, as part of the Wish You Were Here set. Gilmour and Waters sang in unison with Gilmour playing the rhythm guitar and Snowy White playing the guitar solos.

Waters has also played the song on nearly every one of his solo tours, except for the 1999–2002 In the Flesh tour, the 2009–11 Wall tour, and the 2017 Us + Them Tour.

== Roy Harper reaction ==
In a 2011 video interview with John Edginton, Roy Harper said that he was unhappy he had not been credited by the band for singing the song "for the first 10 or 15 years" after it came out. He also said he was not paid the agreed payment; he wanted tickets for life to Lord's (cricket grounds) but received "a few hundred quid" instead. Harper had to hire a lawyer to resolve this grievance, which he called "ironic" and said it made the song (which is about ripoffs in the music business) into a self-fulfilling prophecy by turning the collaboration among friends into "the dirty music business."

== Personnel ==
- David Gilmour – electric guitars
- Richard Wright – Wurlitzer electric piano, ARP String Ensemble, Minimoog, Hohner clavinet D6, piano
- Roger Waters – bass
- Nick Mason – drums

with:

- Roy Harper – lead vocals

== Charts ==
Chart (1975)	Peak position
US Cash Box Looking Ahead	119
US Record World Singles Chart 101–150	126

== Certifications ==
Region	Certification	Certified units/sales
New Zealand (RMNZ)	Platinum	30,000^{‡}
United Kingdom (BPI)	Silver	200,000^{‡}
^{‡} Sales+streaming figures based on certification alone.

== Cover versions ==
- In 1979, Warner Bros. Records released a 12" single containing a special disco version of "Have a Cigar" by Rosebud, a studio group led by composer Gabriel Yared, from their album Discoballs: A Tribute to Pink Floyd The song peaked at number 4 on Billboard's Disco Top 80 chart in June 1979. The B-side was a disco version of "Money"
- In 1992, the band Primus recorded a cover of the song and included it as the closing track to their Miscellaneous Debris EP. Their version changed the lyrics slightly: "The band is just fantastic, of the town you are the talk/Man, but who the hell's this guy they call Bob Cock?"
- Foo Fighters recorded two different cover versions of the song. The first was used as b-side for the "Learn to Fly" CD single, while the second one, with Brian May on lead guitar, first appeared on the Mission: Impossible 2 soundtrack, and later as an Amazon.com bonus track on their 2009 Greatest Hits album and in the 2011 limited-edition vinyl only release Medium Rare, released for Record Store Day Both versions were sung by drummer Taylor Hawkins.
- The album Instead, released in 2007 by Onetwo, contains a cover version of "Have a Cigar"
- The main riff of "Have a Cigar" is incorporated into the song "Peruvian Skies" by progressive metal band Dream Theater on their 1998 live album Once in a LIVEtime and on the Live DVD 5 Years in a Livetime.
- A free CD given with the October 2011 issue of UK music magazine Mojo includes a cover version of "Have a Cigar" by John Foxx and The Maths This version was later announced by Mojo as 'not the finished version' and the correct version was offered as a free download from the website
- Gov't Mule performed the song as part of their Dark Side of the Mule live album from 2008, which consisted of half original material, half Pink Floyd covers
- Fidlar recorded a cover of the song featuring Dr. Dre and AM in 2018 with slightly modified lyrics (“We’ll buy you a new liver. By the way, which one is FIDLAR/fiddler?”)
