= Wish You Were Here (Pink Floyd album) =

- Standard artwork for most releases. Cover by Hipgnosis.

Studio album by Pink Floyd
- Released: 12 September 1975
- Recorded: 13 January – 28 July 1975
- Studios: EMI, London
- Genres: Progressive rock; art rock; experimental rock
- Length: 44:05
- Labels: Harvest; Columbia
- Producer: Pink Floyd

Pink Floyd chronology
A Nice Pair (1973)	Wish You Were Here (1975)	Animals (1977)

Additional cover
- Banner identifying the album (Note: The banner was used for the following releases: 1970s vinyl releases packaged in black shrink wrap, 1970s tape releases, 1980s European CD re-releases, and slipcase of 2010s vinyl/CD re-releases.)

Singles from Wish You Were Here
- 1. "Have a Cigar" Released: November 1975

Wish You Were Here is the ninth studio album by the English rock band Pink Floyd, released on 12 September 1975 through Harvest Records in the United Kingdom and a day later in the United States through Columbia Records, as the band's first album for the label. Based on material composed while performing in Europe, Wish You Were Here was recorded over numerous sessions throughout 1975 at EMI Studios in London.

The lyrics express longing, alienation, and sardonic criticism of the music industry. The bulk of the album is taken up by "Shine On You Crazy Diamond", a nine-part tribute to Syd Barrett, a Pink Floyd co-founder who had left seven years earlier due to his deteriorating mental health; Barrett coincidentally visited the studio during recording. As with their previous release, The Dark Side of the Moon (1973), Pink Floyd employed studio effects and synthesisers. Guest singers included Roy Harper, who sang lead on "Have a Cigar", and Venetta Fields and Carlena Williams, who sang backing vocals on "Shine On You Crazy Diamond". To promote the album, Pink Floyd released the double A-side single "Have a Cigar" / "Welcome to the Machine".

Wish You Were Here topped charts in several countries, including the UK Albums Chart and US Billboard 200. It was certified gold in the UK and US in its year of release, and by 2004, it had sold an estimated 13 million copies worldwide. Upon release, it received mixed reviews from critics, who found its music "uninspiring" and "inferior" to the group's previous work. However, it has later been acclaimed as one of the greatest albums of the 1970s and of all time, with Rolling Stone ranking it number 264 in their 2020 revision of their "500 Greatest Albums of All Time" list. Keyboardist Richard Wright, drummer Nick Mason, and guitarist David Gilmour have cited it as their favourite Pink Floyd album, while bassist Roger Waters called it their "most complete" album.

== Background ==
In 1974, Pink Floyd sketched out three new songs, "Raving and Drooling", "You Gotta Be Crazy", and "Shine On You Crazy Diamond". (Note: The first two would later be renamed "Sheep" and "Dogs", and would end up on Animals.) These songs were performed during a series of concerts in France and England, the band's first tour since 1973's The Dark Side of the Moon. As Pink Floyd had never employed a publicist and kept themselves distant from the press, their relationship with the media began to sour. Nick Mason said later that a critical NME review by Nick Kent, who Mason felt preferred the band's earlier music, may have influenced the band to return to the studio during the first week of 1975.

== Concept ==
Wish You Were Here is the second Pink Floyd album with a conceptual theme, mostly at Roger Waters's direction, reflecting his feeling that the previous communal structure of the band had disappeared in favour of more professional musicianship. "I had some criticisms of Dark Side of the Moon", noted David Gilmour, saying that "[o]ne or two of the vehicles carrying the ideas were not as strong as the ideas that they carried. I thought we should try and work harder on marrying the idea and the vehicle that carried it, so that they both had an equal magic [...] It's something I was personally pushing when we made Wish You Were Here." The album begins with a long instrumental introduction shifting from ambient music to the main refrain of "Shine On You Crazy Diamond", the lyrics of which were penned as a tribute to Syd Barrett, whose mental breakdown had forced him to leave the group seven years earlier.

Wish You Were Here also features lyrical criticism of the rock music industry and the then-recent mainstream perception of the band. "Shine On" crosses seamlessly into "Welcome to the Machine", a song that begins with an opening door (described by Waters as a symbol of musical discovery and progress betrayed by a music industry more interested in greed and success) and ends with a party, the latter epitomising "the lack of contact and real feelings between people". Similarly, "Have a Cigar" scorns record industry "fat-cats" with the lyrics repeating a stream of clichés heard by rising newcomers in the industry, and including the question "by the way, which one's Pink?"; this was derived from an actual interaction with an agent who asked this of the band. The lyrics of the next song, "Wish You Were Here", relate both to Barrett's absence and to the dichotomy of Waters' character, with greed and ambition battling with compassion and idealism as the popularity of the band was growing.

== Recording ==
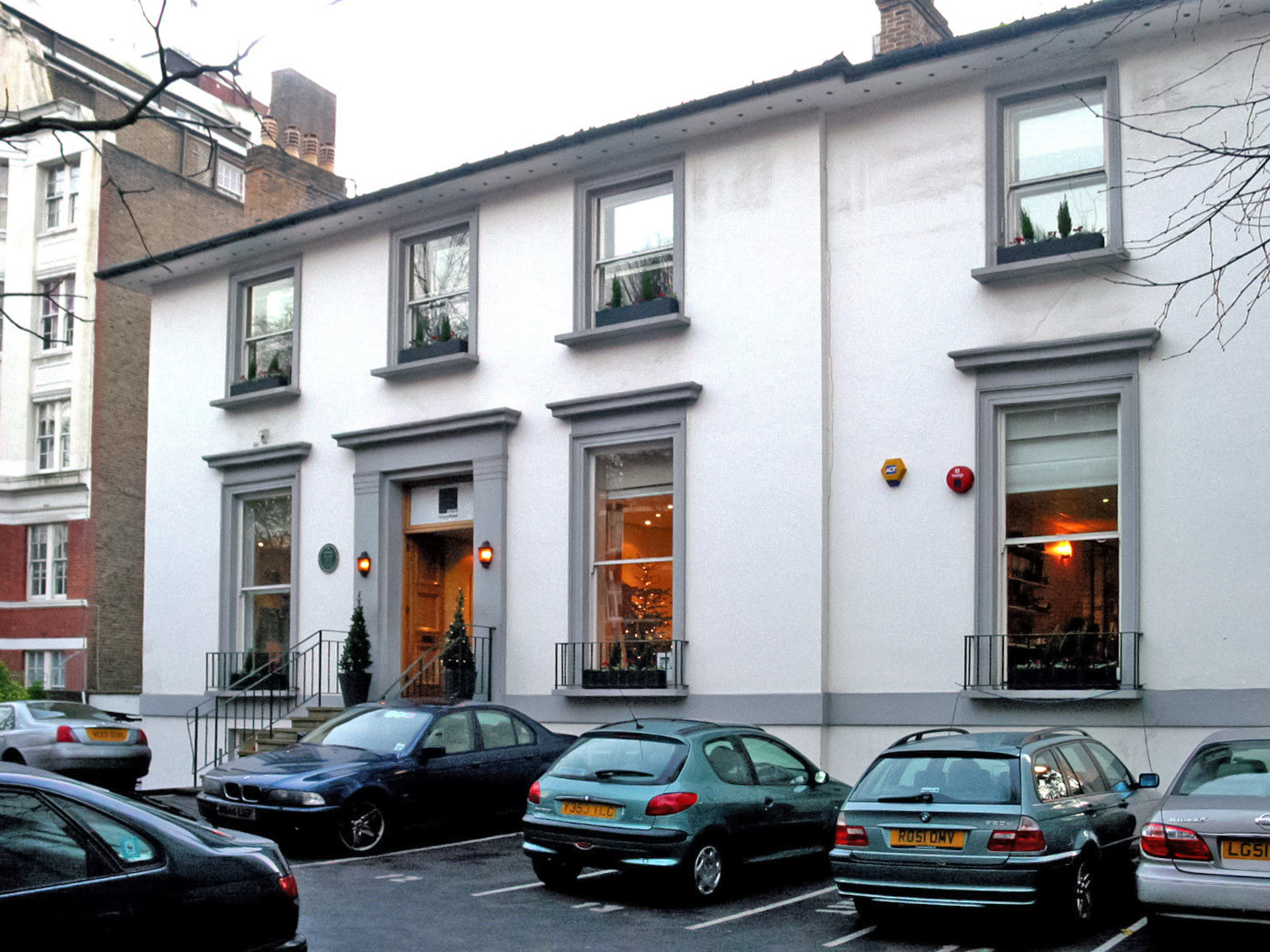
Abbey Road Studios, formerly EMI Studios

Alan Parsons, the EMI Studios (now Abbey Road Studios) staff engineer for Pink Floyd's previous studio album, The Dark Side of the Moon, declined to continue working with them due to the recent formation of his own group and working on their first album. Pink Floyd had worked with the engineer Brian Humphries on More, recorded at Pye Studios, and again in 1974 when he replaced an inexperienced concert engineer. Humphries, being a stranger to EMI's Abbey Road set-up, encountered some early difficulties. On one occasion, Humphries inadvertently spoiled the backing tracks for "Shine On", a piece that Waters and drummer Nick Mason had spent many hours perfecting, with echo. The entire piece had to be re-recorded.

The sessions for Wish You Were Here at EMI's Studio Three lasted from January until July 1975, recording on four days each week from 2:30 pm until very late in the evening. The group found it difficult at first to devise any new material, especially as the success of The Dark Side of the Moon had left all four physically and emotionally drained. The keyboardist Richard Wright later described these sessions as "falling within a difficult period", and Waters recalled them as "torturous". Mason found the process of multi-track recording to be "tedious", while Gilmour was more interested in improving the band's existing material. Gilmour was also becoming increasingly frustrated with Mason, whose failing marriage had brought on a general malaise and sense of apathy, both of which interfered with his drumming.

Gilmour said the band had realised their dreams of becoming rich and famous musicians, and so had to "reassess what [they] were in it for thereafter, and it was a pretty confusing and sort of empty time for a while". Humphries recalled days of inactivity: "I don't think they knew what they wanted to do. We had a dartboard and an air rifle and we'd play these word games, sit around, get drunk, go home and return the next day. That's all we were doing until suddenly everything started falling into place."

After several weeks, Waters began to visualise another concept. The three new compositions from the 1974 tours were at least a starting point for a new album, and "Shine On You Crazy Diamond" seemed a reasonable choice as a centrepiece for the new work. Mostly an instrumental 20-minute-plus piece similar to "Echoes", the opening four-note guitar phrase reminded Waters of Barrett. Gilmour had composed the phrase while improvising, but was encouraged by Waters's positive response to make it the focus of the song. A subtle refrain performed by Wright, lifted from "See Emily Play", is also audible towards the end. Waters wanted to split "Shine On You Crazy Diamond", and sandwich two new songs between its two halves. Gilmour disagreed, but was outvoted three to one. "Welcome to the Machine" and "Have a Cigar" were attacks on the music business, their lyrics working with "Shine On" to provide a summary of the rise and fall of Barrett; Waters, on the reason of Barrett's experiences as a subject of these, said: "Because I wanted to get as close as possible to what I felt ... that sort of indefinable, inevitable melancholy about the disappearance of Syd." "Raving and Drooling" and "You've Got To Be Crazy" had no place in the new concept, and were set aside until the following album, 1977's Animals.

=== Syd Barrett's visit ===
On 5 June 1975, on the eve of the second North American leg of their Wish You Were Here Tour, Gilmour married his first wife, Ginger. (Note: There seems to be some confusion about the date that Barrett turned up, and Gilmour's wedding. Blake 2008 writes that Gilmour's wedding was on 7 July, the date also given by Ginger in "The Pink Floyd FAQ", but that witnesses swore they saw Barrett at his reception at Abbey Road. Other authors claim that the reception and Barrett's visit were on 5 June.) That day, the band were completing the mix of "Shine On You Crazy Diamond" (Note: Nick Mason has expressed doubt over this.) when an overweight man with a shaven head and eyebrows entered, carrying a plastic bag. Waters did not recognise him, and Gilmour presumed he was an EMI staff member. Wright presumed he was a friend of Waters, but realised it was Barrett. (Note: According to Aubrey Powell (Thorgerson's partner at the design studio Hipgnosis), Barrett visited the Hipgnosis office earlier that day and asked where the band was recording. Powell directed Barrett to the Abbey Road session.) Mason also failed to recognise him, and was "horrified" when Gilmour identified him. In Mason's memoir Inside Out, he recalled Barrett's conversation as "desultory and not entirely sensible". Storm Thorgerson would later reflect on Barrett's presence: "Two or three people cried. He sat round and talked for a bit but he wasn't really there." According to Gilmour, Barrett "came two or three days and then he didn't come any more."

Waters was reportedly reduced to tears by the sight of his former bandmate. Fellow visitor Andrew King asked Barrett how he had gained weight; he said that he had been overeating while living in isolation. He showed an unexpected enthusiasm for participating in the recording of the album, but while listening to the mix of "Shine On", showed no signs of understanding its relevance to him. Barrett also joined Gilmour's wedding reception in the EMI canteen, but left unnoticed. Apart from Waters seeing Barrett in Harrods a couple of years later, it has been agreed by biographers and journalists to be the last time any member of the band saw him alive. This series of events is regarded to have tonally influenced the final version of "Shine On You Crazy Diamond". Waters said later that "'Shine On' is not really about Syd – he's just a symbol for all the extremes of absence some people have to indulge in because it's the only way they can cope with how fucking sad it is, modern life, to withdraw completely. I found that terribly sad."

=== Instrumentation ===
"Shine On You Crazy Diamond"
The four note phrase from "Shine On You Crazy Diamond", composed by David Gilmour

"Have a Cigar"
"Have a Cigar" was sung by Roy Harper, something that Waters later regretted. The song contains lyrics that are critical of the music industry.

As with The Dark Side of the Moon, the band used synthesizers such as the EMS VCS 3 (on "Welcome to the Machine"), but softened with Gilmour's acoustic guitar, and percussion from Mason. The beginning of "Shine On" contains remnants from a previous but incomplete studio recording by the band known as Household Objects. Wine glasses had been filled with varying amounts of fluid, and recordings were made of a wet finger circling the edge of each glass. These recordings were multi-tracked into chords.

The jazz violinist Stéphane Grappelli and the classical violinist Yehudi Menuhin were performing in another studio in the building, and were invited to record a piece. Menuhin watched as Grappelli played on "Wish You Were Here"; however, the band later decided his contribution was unsuitable and Mason has erroneously stated that the piece was wiped. In actuality Grappelli's playing was included, but so low in the final mix that the band presumed it would be insulting to credit him. He was paid £300 (equivalent to £2,300 in 2025). The saxophonist Dick Parry, who had performed on The Dark Side of the Moon, performed on "Shine On You Crazy Diamond". The opening bars of "Wish You Were Here" were recorded from Gilmour's car radio, with Gilmour turning the dial (the classical music heard is the finale of Tchaikovsky's Fourth Symphony).

=== Vocals ===
Recording sessions had twice been interrupted by US tours (one in April and the other in June 1975), and the final sessions, which occurred after the band's performance at Knebworth, proved particularly troublesome for Waters. He struggled to record the vocals for "Have a Cigar", requiring several takes to perform an acceptable version. His problems stemmed in part from the stresses placed upon his voice while recording the lead vocals of "Shine On You Crazy Diamond". Gilmour was asked to sing in his place, but declined, and eventually the colleague and friend Roy Harper was asked to stand in. Harper was recording his own album in another of EMI's studios, and Gilmour had already performed some guitar licks for him. Waters later regretted the decision, believing he should have performed the song. The Blackberries recorded backing vocals for "Shine On You Crazy Diamond".

=== Touring ===
Before releasing the album, the band embarked on a short tour of North America. The tour featured the live debut of "Have a Cigar" and "Shine On You Crazy Diamond". The other two songs from Wish You Were Here (the title track and "Welcome to the Machine") wouldn't be played live until their In the Flesh concert series of 1977.

The final performance of the tour took place in the UK on 5 July 1975, two months before the release of the album, at the Knebworth Festival. Harper, performing at the same event, on discovering that his stage costume was missing, proceeded to destroy one of Pink Floyd's vans, injuring himself in the process. This delayed the setup of the band's sound system. As a pair of World War II Spitfire aircraft had been booked to fly over the crowd during their entrance, the band were not able to delay their set. The result was that a power supply problem pushed Wright's keyboards completely out of tune, damaging the band's performance. At one point he left the stage, but the band were able to continue with a less sensitive keyboard, a piano and a simpler light show. Following a brief intermission, they returned to perform The Dark Side of the Moon, but critics displeased about being denied access backstage savaged the performance.

== Packaging and album cover art ==
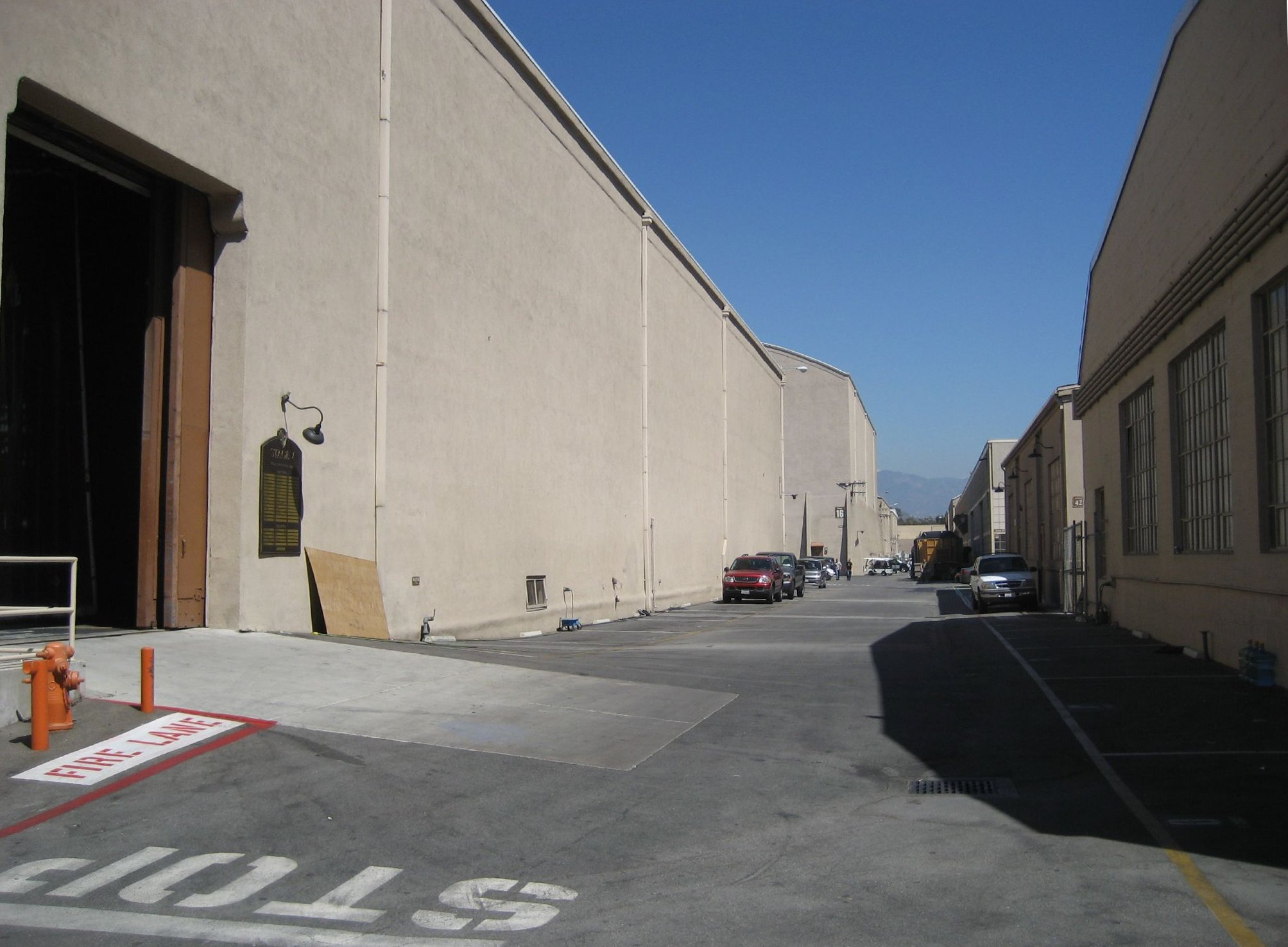
Part of the Warner Bros. studio complex in California, where the cover image was photographed

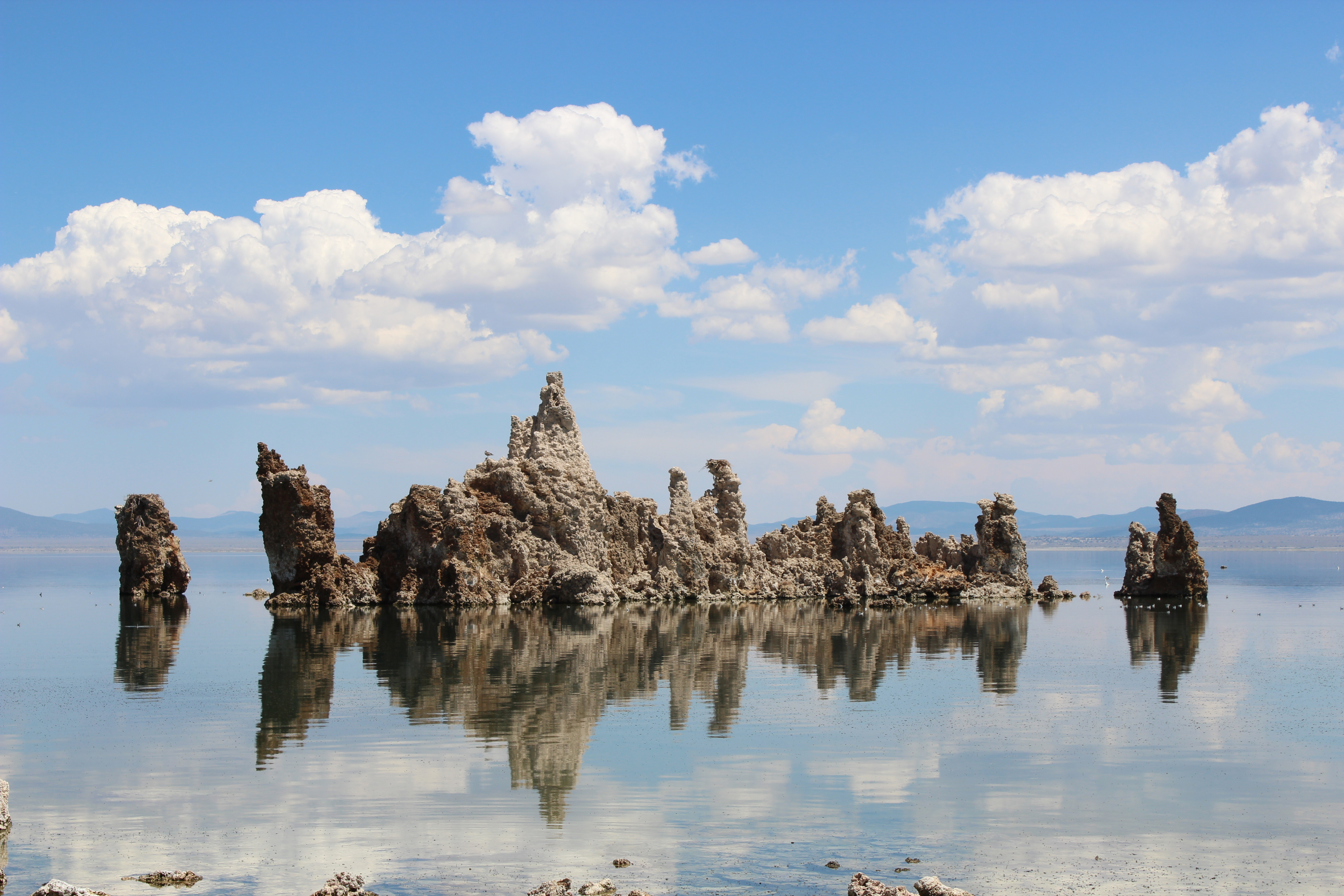
Mono Lake in California

Wish You Were Here was sold in one of the more elaborate packages to accompany a Pink Floyd album. Storm Thorgerson had accompanied the band on their 1974 tour and had given serious thought to the meaning of the lyrics, eventually deciding that the songs were, in general, concerned with "unfulfilled presence", rather than Barrett's illness. This theme of absence was reflected in the ideas produced by his long hours spent brainstorming with the band. Thorgerson had noted that Roxy Music's Country Life was sold in an opaque green cellophane sleeve – censoring the cover image – and he copied the idea, concealing the artwork for Wish You Were Here in a black-coloured shrink-wrap (therefore making the album art "absent"). The concept behind "Welcome to the Machine" and "Have a Cigar" suggested the use of a handshake (an often empty gesture), and George Hardie designed a sticker containing the album's logo of two mechanical hands engaged in a handshake, to be placed on the opaque sleeve (the mechanical handshake logo would also appear on the labels of the vinyl album this time in a black and blue background).

The cover images were photographed by Aubrey Powell, Thorgerson's partner at the design studio Hipgnosis, and inspired by the idea that people tend to conceal their true feelings, for fear of "getting burned", and thus two businessmen were pictured shaking hands, one man on fire. "Getting burned" was also a common phrase in the music industry, used often by artists denied royalty payments. Two stuntmen were used, Ronnie Rondell Jr. and Danny Rogers, the former dressed in a fireproof suit covered by a business suit. His head was protected by a hood, underneath a similarly fireproof wig, and fire-resistant gel was applied to him. The photograph was taken at Warner Bros. Studios in California, known at the time as The Burbank Studios. While the first fourteen takes were successful, Rondell suffered minor burns when the wind changed direction on the fifteenth, singeing his moustache. The two stuntmen changed positions, and the image was later reversed.

The back cover depicts a faceless "Floyd salesman", in Thorgerson's words, "selling his soul" in the desert (shot in the Yuma Desert in California again by Powell). The absence of wrists and ankles signifies his presence as an "empty suit". The inner sleeve shows a veil concealing a nude woman in a windswept Norfolk grove, and a splash-less diver at Mono Lake – titled Monosee (the German translation of Mono Lake) in the liner notes – in California (again emphasising the theme of absence). Various releases on vinyl included a postcard with this image. The decision to shroud the cover in black plastic was not popular with the band's US record company, Columbia Records, which insisted that it be changed but was over-ruled. EMI was less concerned; the band were reportedly extremely happy with the end product, and when presented with a pre-production mockup, they accepted it with a spontaneous round of applause.

== Release ==
Wish You Were Here was released on 12 September 1975 in the UK, and on the following day in the US. It was Pink Floyd's first album with Columbia Records, an affiliate of CBS; the band and their manager Steve O'Rourke had been dissatisfied with the efforts of EMI's US label Capitol Records. The band remained with EMI's Harvest Records in Europe.

In Britain, with 250,000 advance sales, the album debuted at number three and reached number one the following week. (Note: In his group biography, Nicholas Schaffner wrote "In America, the album hit number one in its second week on the Billboard charts; in Britain—where it went directly to the top on the strength of a quarter-million's advance sales ..." [emphasis added]) Demand was such that EMI informed retailers that only half of their orders would be fulfilled. With 900,000 advance orders (the largest for any Columbia release) it reached number one on the US Billboard chart in its second week. Wish You Were Here was Pink Floyd's fastest-selling album ever. It was certified silver and gold (60,000 and 100,000 sales respectively) in the UK on 1 August 1975, and Gold in the US on 17 September 1975. It was certified seven-times platinum in the US on 12 December 2025, and by 2004 had sold an estimated 13 million copies worldwide. "Have a Cigar" was chosen by Columbia as the first single, with "Welcome to the Machine" on the B-side in the US. (Note: EMI Capitol 72438–58885)

== Critical reception and legacy ==
Retrospective professional reviews
Review scores
Source	Rating
AllMusic	5/5 stars
Blender	5/5 stars
Christgau's Record Guide	A−
Encyclopedia of Popular Music	5/5 stars
The Great Rock Discography	10/10
MusicHound Rock	5/5
Pitchfork	10/10
Record Collector	5/5 stars
The Rolling Stone Album Guide	5/5 stars
Tom Hull – on the Web	A

Wish You Were Here initially received mixed reviews. Ben Edmonds wrote in Rolling Stone that the band's "lackadaisical demeanor" leaves the subject of Barrett "unrealised; they give such a matter-of-fact reading of the goddamn thing that they might as well be singing about Roger Waters's brother-in-law getting a parking ticket". Edmonds concluded the band is "devoid" of the "sincere passion for their 'art'" that contemporary space rock acts purportedly have. Melody Maker's reviewer wrote: "From whichever direction one approaches Wish You Were Here, it still sounds unconvincing in its ponderous sincerity and displays a critical lack of imagination in all departments."

In The Village Voice, Robert Christgau wrote: "The music is not only simple and attractive, with the synthesizer used mostly for texture and the guitar breaks for comment, but it actually achieves some of the symphonic dignity (and cross-referencing) that The Dark Side of the Moon simulated so ponderously." Years later, he wrote that Wish You Were Here was his favourite Pink Floyd album: "It has soul [...] It's Roger Waters's lament for Syd, not my idea of a tragic hero but as long as he's Roger's that doesn't matter."

Paul Stump, in his 1997 History of Progressive Rock, argued that critical disappointment with Wish You Were Here was likely inevitable due to the monumental expectations of what "was (at the time) the most eagerly anticipated rock album ever released. Even the announcement of its issue date was headline news. These hosannas were grounded on no more than the fact that it was simply the Floyd's follow-up to [The] Dark Side of the Moon, which represented, for many, the acme of the genre to date." He was critical of the dominance of synthesiser textures, saying it often made Wish You Were Here sound like a showcase for Wright's new equipment.

Wish You Were Here has been frequently named one of the greatest albums and one of the greatest progressive rock albums. In 2003, it was ranked at number 209 on Rolling Stone's list of the 500 greatest albums of all time, ranked at number 211 in a 2012 revised list, and ranked at number 264 in a 2023 revised list. In 2015, Rolling Stone named it the fourth-greatest progressive rock album. In 2014, Prog readers voted it the seventh-greatest progressive rock album. In 1998, Q readers voted Wish You Were Here the 34th-greatest album. In 2000, Q placed it at number 43 in its list of the 100 Greatest British Albums Ever. In 2000, it was voted number 38 in Colin Larkin's All Time Top 1000 Albums. In 2007, one of Germany's largest public radio stations, WDR 2, asked its listeners to vote for the 200 best albums of all time. Wish You Were Here was voted number one. In 2004, Wish You Were Here was ranked number 36 on the Pitchfork list of the Top 100 albums of the 1970s. IGN rated Wish You Were Here as the eighth-greatest classic rock album, and Ultimate Classic Rock placed Wish You Were Here as the second-best Pink Floyd album.

Wright and Gilmour cited Wish You Were Here as their favourite Pink Floyd album. Wright said: "It's an album I can listen to for pleasure, and there aren't many Floyd albums that I can." Gilmour said: "The end result of all that, whatever it was, definitely has left me an album I can live with very very happily. I like it very much." Waters said Wish You Were Here and The Dark Side of the Moon were the "most complete" Pink Floyd albums, and that Wish You Were Here and their next album, Animals (1977), "signalled the end of the band as it had been before".

== Reissues and remastering ==
Wish You Were Here has been remastered and re-released on several formats. In the UK and US it was re-issued in quadraphonic using the SQ format in 1976, (Note: EMI Harvest Q4 SHVL 814 (UK), Columbia PCQ 33453 (US)) and in 1980 a special Hi-Fi Today audiophile print was released in the UK. (Note: EMI Harvest SHVL 814) It was released on CD in Japan in October 1982, (Note: CBS/Sony 35DP 4) in the US in 1983, and in the UK in 1985, (Note: Columbia CK 33453 (US), EMI CDP 7460352 (UK)) and again as a remastered CD with new artwork in 1994. (Note: EMI CD EMD 1062) In the US, Columbia's CBS Mastersound label released a half-speed mastered audiophile LP in 1981, (Note: Columbia HC 33453) and in 1994 Sony Mastersound released a 24-carat gold-plated CD, remastered using Super Bit Mapping, with the original artwork from the LP in both longbox and jewel case forms, the latter with a cardboard slipcover. (Note: Columbia CK 53753) The album was included as part of the box set Shine On, and three years later Columbia Records released an updated remastered CD, 17 seconds longer than the EMI remasters from 1994, giving a running time of 44:28.

The label was a recreation of the original machine handshake logo, with a black and blue background. (Note: Columbia CK 64405) Wish You Were Here was rereleased in 2000 for its 25th anniversary, on the Capitol Records label in the US. (Note: Capitol 72438297502) It was re-released and remixed in 2011. The Wish You Were Here – Immersion Box Set includes the new stereo digital remaster (2011) by James Guthrie on CD, a previously unreleased 5.1 Surround Mix (2009) by James Guthrie on DVD and Blu-ray, a Quad Mix (which had been released only on vinyl LP and 8-track tape) on DVD, as well as the original stereo mix (1975) on DVD and Blu-ray. (Note: Capitol 509990294352) This campaign also featured the 2011 stereo remaster on 180g heavyweight vinyl. (Note: Capitol 5099902988016) In September 2025, Sony announced a 50th-anniversary box set, with a new Dolby Atmos mix, additional tracks and live performances, and a hardcover book.

== Track listing ==
All lyrics written by Roger Waters.

Side one
No.	Title	Music	Lead vocals	Length
1.	"Shine On You Crazy Diamond" (Parts I–V)	Richard Wright; Roger Waters; David Gilmour	Waters	13:33
2.	"Welcome to the Machine"	Waters	Gilmour	7:25
Total length:				20:58

Side two
No.	Title	Music	Lead vocals	Length
1.	"Have a Cigar"	Waters	Roy Harper	5:08
2.	"Wish You Were Here"	Waters; Gilmour	Gilmour	5:35
3.	"Shine On You Crazy Diamond" (Parts VI–IX)	Wright (Parts VI - IX); Waters (Parts VI - VIII); Gilmour (Parts VI - VIII)	Waters	12:24
Total length:				23:07 (44:05)

== Personnel ==
Adapted from Jean-Michel Guesdon & Philippe Margotin, Dave Simpson, and CD pressing booklets

=== Musicians ===
==== Pink Floyd ====
- David Gilmour – lead vocals (tracks 2, 4), vocal harmonies (tracks 1–2, 4–5), electric lead guitar (1, 3, 5), electric rhythm guitar (tracks 1, 3, 5), acoustic guitar (tracks 2, 4), Twelve-string guitar (track 4), pedal steel guitar (tracks 4–5), bass (track 5), EMS VCS 3 (tracks 2–3)
- Nick Mason – drums (tracks 1, 3–5), timpani and cymbals (track 2)
- Roger Waters – lead vocals (tracks 1, 5), vocal harmonies (track 1), bass (all tracks), EMS VCS 3 (tracks 1–4)
- Richard Wright – vocal harmonies (tracks 1, 5), keyboards (all tracks), Steinway piano (tracks 1, 4–5), vibraphone (track 1), Minimoog (all tracks), EMS VCS 3 (track 1)

==== Additional musicians ====
- Venetta Fields, Carlena Williams – backing vocals (tracks 1, 5)
- Dick Parry – saxophones (track 1)
- Roy Harper – lead vocals (track 3)
- Stéphane Grappelli – violin (track 4; mixed down to an almost inaudible level on original release, restored only on Experience Edition)
- Unidentified musician(s) – singing glasses (tracks 1, 5), sound effects (tracks 1, 5), EMS VCS 3 (track 5)

=== Production ===
- Pink Floyd – producer
- Brian Humphries – sound engineer
- Peter James – assistant sound engineer
- Doug Sax, James Guthrie – 1992 remastering at The Mastering Lab
- James Guthrie, Joel Plante – 2011 remastering at das boot recording

=== Technical ===
- Phil Taylor – road manager/equipment technician. Additional photography(remaster & 50th anniversary edition)
- Hipgnosis – design, photography
- Peter Christopherson, Jeff Smith, Howard Bartrop and Richard Manning – design assistants
- George Hardie – graphics
- Jill Furmanovsky – additional photography (remaster)

== Charts ==
=== Weekly charts ===
1975–2011 weekly chart performance for Wish You Were Here
Chart (1975)	Peak position
Australian Albums (Kent Music Report)	1
Austrian Albums (Ö3 Austria)	2
Canada Top Albums/CDs (RPM)	14
Finnish Albums (Suomen Virallinen)	1
Dutch Albums (Album Top 100)	1
German Albums (Offizielle Top 100)	6
Italian Albums (Musica e Dischi)	1
New Zealand Albums (RMNZ)	1
Norwegian Albums (VG-lista)	2
Spanish Albums (AFE)	1
Swedish Albums (Sverigetopplistan)	14
UK Albums (Official Charts)	1
US Billboard 200	1
Chart (1976)	Peak position
Dutch Albums (Album Top 100)	9
New Zealand Albums (RMNZ)	8
Norwegian Albums (VG-lista)	6
UK Albums (Official Charts)	15
Chart (1977)	Peak position
New Zealand Albums (RMNZ)	29
UK Albums (Official Charts)	28
Chart (1978)	Peak position
Austrian Albums (Ö3 Austria)	23
German Albums (Offizielle Top 100)	6
UK Albums (Official Charts)	52
Chart (1979)	Peak position
New Zealand Albums (RMNZ)	44
UK Albums (Official Charts)	75
Chart (1980)	Peak position
New Zealand Albums (RMNZ)	36
Norwegian Albums (VG-lista)	40
Chart (1988)	Peak position
New Zealand Albums (RMNZ)	29
UK Albums (Official Charts)	97
Chart (1994)	Peak position
German Albums (Offizielle Top 100)	33
Swedish Albums (Sverigetopplistan)	47
UK Albums (Official Charts)	52
Chart (1995)	Peak position
UK Albums (Official Charts)	87
Chart (1997)	Peak position
German Albums (Offizielle Top 100)	43
Chart (2005)	Peak position
UK Albums (Official Charts)	65
Chart (2006)	Peak position
Belgian Albums (Ultratop Flanders)	85
Belgian Albums (Ultratop Wallonia)	95
Italian Albums (FIMI)	13
Spanish Albums (Promusicae)	67
Swiss Albums (Schweizer Hitparade)	70
Chart (2008)	Peak position
Spanish Albums (Promusicae)	70
Chart (2011)	Peak position
Austrian Albums (Ö3 Austria)	31
Belgian Albums (Ultratop Flanders)	77
Belgian Albums (Ultratop Wallonia)	68
Czech Albums (ČNS IFPI)	34
Dutch Albums (Album Top 100)	62
Finnish Albums (Suomen virallinen lista)	50
French Albums (SNEP)	34
German Albums (Offizielle Top 100)	4
Italian Albums (FIMI)	10
New Zealand Albums (RMNZ)	24
Norwegian Albums (VG-lista)	24
Polish Albums (ZPAV)	20
Portuguese Albums (AFP)	19
Spanish Albums (Promusicae)	17
Swedish Albums (Sverigetopplistan)	22
Swiss Albums (Schweizer Hitparade)	15
UK Albums (Official Charts)	38
US Billboard 200	33

2012–2026 weekly chart performance for Wish You Were Here
Chart (2012)	Peak position
New Zealand Albums (RMNZ)	28
Norwegian Albums (VG-lista)	25
Spanish Albums (Promusicae)	25
Swedish Albums (Sverigetopplistan)	60
UK Albums (Official Charts)	74
Chart (2013)	Peak position
Finnish Albums (Suomen virallinen lista)	19
Norwegian Albums (VG-lista)	33
UK Albums (Official Charts)	65
Chart (2014)	Peak position
Czech Albums (ČNS IFPI)	28
German Albums (Offizielle Top 100)	90
Swiss Albums (Schweizer Hitparade)	74
Chart (2015)	Peak position
Czech Albums (ČNS IFPI)	51
Chart (2016)	Peak position
Austrian Albums (Ö3 Austria)	70
Czech Albums (ČNS IFPI)	84
German Albums (Offizielle Top 100)	73
Swiss Albums (Schweizer Hitparade)	47
UK Albums (Official Charts)	93
Chart (2017)	Peak position
Czech Albums (ČNS IFPI)	48
Portuguese Albums (AFP)	50
UK Albums (Official Charts)	100
Chart (2018)	Peak position
Czech Albums (ČNS IFPI)	37
Polish Albums (ZPAV)	32
Portuguese Albums (AFP)	11
Chart (2019)	Peak position
Czech Albums (ČNS IFPI)	76
Portuguese Albums (AFP)	25
Chart (2020)	Peak position
Belgian Albums (Ultratop Flanders)	94
Portuguese Albums (AFP)	18
Chart (2021)	Peak position
Belgian Albums (Ultratop Flanders)	78
German Albums (Offizielle Top 100)	87
Portuguese Albums (AFP)	3
Swiss Albums (Schweizer Hitparade)	58
Chart (2025)	Peak position
Belgian Albums (Ultratop Flanders)	4
Belgian Albums (Ultratop Wallonia)	2
Canadian Albums (Billboard)	15
Czech Albums (ČNS IFPI)	34
Danish Albums (Hitlisten)	5
German Rock & Metal Albums (Offizielle Top 100)	1
Greek Albums (IFPI)	19
Hungarian Albums (MAHASZ)	4
Irish Albums (Official Charts)	13
Italian Albums (FIMI)	1
Japanese Albums (Oricon)	18
Polish Albums (ZPAV)	4
Portuguese Albums (AFP)	2
Scottish Albums (Official Charts)	1
Spanish Albums (Promusicae)	9
Swiss Albums (Schweizer Hitparade)	1
UK Albums (Official Charts)	1
UK Rock & Metal Albums (Official Charts)	1
Chart (2026)	Peak position
Croatian International Albums (HDU)	5

=== Year-end charts ===
Year-end chart performance for Wish You Were Here
Chart (1975)	Position
Australian Albums (Kent Music Report)	12
Austrian Albums (Ö3 Austria)	8
Dutch Albums (Album Top 100)	6
New Zealand Albums (RMNZ)	11
UK Albums (OCC)	22
Chart (1976)	Position
German Albums (Offizielle Top 100)	8
New Zealand Albums (RMNZ)	26
UK Albums (OCC)	47
Chart (1977)	Position
German Albums (Offizielle Top 100)	2
Chart (1978)	Position
German Albums (Offizielle Top 100)	2
Chart (1979)	Position
German Albums (Offizielle Top 100)	3
Chart (1980)	Position
German Albums (Offizielle Top 100)	9
Chart (1981)	Position
German Albums (Offizielle Top 100)	53

== Certifications and sales ==
Region	Certification	Certified units/sales
Argentina (CAPIF)	Gold	30,000^{^}
Australia (ARIA)	7× Platinum	490,000^{^}
Austria (IFPI Austria)	2× Platinum	100,000^{*}
Brazil	—	80,000
Canada (Music Canada)	3× Platinum	300,000^{^}
Denmark (IFPI Danmark)	3× Platinum	60,000^{‡}
France (SNEP)	Diamond	1,000,000^{*}
Germany (BVMI)	Platinum	1,500,000
Greece (IFPI Greece)	Gold	70,000
Italy sales to June 1979	—	450,000
Italy (FIMI) sales since 2009	4× Platinum	200,000^{‡}
New Zealand (RMNZ) Remastered	4× Platinum	60,000^{^}
Poland (ZPAV)	Gold	35,000^{*}
Poland (ZPAV) Rerelease	Platinum	20,000^{‡}
Portugal (AFP)	Gold	3,500^{‡}
Spain	—	325,000
United Kingdom (BPI)	3× Platinum	900,000^{‡}
United States (RIAA)	7× Platinum	7,000,000^{‡}
Summaries
Worldwide	—	20,000,000
^{*} Sales figures based on certification alone.^{^} Shipments figures based on certification alone.^{‡} Sales+streaming figures based on certification alone.

== See also ==
- Vegetable Man
