= Sheep (Pink Floyd song) =

Promotional single by Pink Floyd

from the album Animals
- A-side: "Pigs on the Wing"
- Released: 21 January 1977
- Recorded: April–May, July 1976
- Studio: Britannia Row, London
- Genre: Progressive rock; hard rock; experimental rock
- Length: 10:20 (album version) 9:46 (Echoes: The Best of Pink Floyd version) 4:14 (French single version)
- Label: Harvest (UK); Columbia/CBS (US)
- Songwriter: Roger Waters
- Producer: Pink Floyd

"Sheep" (originally titled "Raving and Drooling") is a song by the English rock band Pink Floyd, released on the 1977 album Animals. It was written and sung by Roger Waters and performed live from 1974 to 1977. Waters has since played the song on solo tours.

== Lyrics ==
Loosely inspired by the allegory of Orwell's Animal Farm, Waters' "sheep" represent the working class, who work blindly, following the "dogs" and "pigs" of society, without questioning the neoliberal capitalist structure they are exploited by, until they finally wake up and rebel against the dogs. The song was influenced by the political and economic turmoil of the time, in particular, the 1976 riots at the Notting Hill Carnival and the Troubles in Northern Ireland. Waters felt that they were going to occur again, such as in Brixton and Toxteth.

The middle section of the song is a snarky parody of Psalm 23.

== History ==
During their DSOTM tours in 1974, Pink Floyd played three new songs in the first half of the shows, followed by The Dark Side of the Moon in its entirety. The three new songs were "You've Got to Be Crazy" which later became "Dogs", "Shine On" and "Raving and Drooling" which later became "Sheep". During performances of "Raving and Drooling", a recording of DJ Jimmy Young at BBC Radio was played after being cut up and reassembled randomly. This was Roger Waters' idea of a man "raving and drooling". The lyrics of the song at this point were different.

"Raving and Drooling" was originally a more jam-based song. While the basic motif was already in place — a held note from the vocalist (Waters) being crossfaded into the same note on a synthesizer, with various inhuman effects applied — Waters had yet to write anything for the sections repeating F♯7 and A7 ("You better watch out! There may be dogs about", and so on), and so these sections, while clearly part of the song structure, were rendered instrumentally. While Gilmour later stated that "Dogs" in its earlier incarnation as "You've Got to Be Crazy" simply had too many words for him to sing, "Raving and Drooling" appeared to suffer more from a lack thereof.

"You've Got to Be Crazy" and "Raving and Drooling" were originally planned to be on the album following the 1974 tours, Wish You Were Here, but Waters insisted the two songs did not fit with the themes of WYWH which he considered to be "absence". The songs were saved for later albums and ended up in different forms on Animals.

Ian Peel, a musical columnist for The Guardian, noted the resemblance of "Sheep" to the Doctor Who theme, due to its bassline and sound effects.

== Recordings ==
The song was recorded during April, May and July 1976 at the band's own Britannia Row Studios, Islington, London. On the 1974–75 tours, Waters played bass for the song, but during recording, he switched to rhythm guitar, while David Gilmour overdubbed the bass guitar part in a style similar to Waters. Richard Wright played the introduction on a Rhodes Piano, which was overdubbed with sheep noises in the background. The rewritten Psalm 23 narration is processed through a vocoder. It was recorded by Nick Mason.

"Sheep" was included on the compilation album Echoes: The Best of Pink Floyd (2001) as the penultimate track on Disc 1. This version of the track features an early fade-out to transition into "Sorrow".

== Live versions ==
In live versions from 1977, backing guitarist Snowy White played bass guitar as Waters shared electric guitar duties with David Gilmour. The performance was almost identical to the album version except that it had a slower ending with Richard Wright playing an organ solo. The middle-section narration was originally performed in live shows by Nick Mason.

In November 2011, versions of "Raving and Drooling" and "You've Got To Be Crazy" recorded at Wembley in 1974 were officially released as part of the Experience and Immersion versions of the Wish You Were Here album.

== Personnel ==
- Roger Waters – lead vocals, rhythm guitar, tape and electronic effects
- David Gilmour – lead guitar, bass guitar, echoed vocal (from "Dogs")
- Richard Wright – Fender Rhodes piano, EMS VCS 3, Minimoog, Solina String Ensemble, Hammond organ
- Nick Mason – drums, tape effects, vocoder
