= Dogs (Pink Floyd song) =

- The cover of the Russian flexi-disc of "Dogs"

Song by Pink Floyd

from the album Animals
- Released: 23 January 1977 (UK)
- Recorded: April–November 1976
- Genre: Progressive rock; experimental rock
- Length: 17:04
- Label: Harvest (UK); Columbia/CBS (US)
- Songwriters: Roger Waters; David Gilmour
- Producer: Pink Floyd

"Dogs" (originally titled "You've Got to Be Crazy") is a song by English rock band Pink Floyd, released on the album Animals in 1977. This song was one of several to be considered for the band's 2001 compilation album Echoes: The Best of Pink Floyd.

== Musical components ==
The music was written in 1974 by David Gilmour and Roger Waters, with lyrics by Waters, and originally titled "You've Got to Be Crazy" and was part of the Wish You Were Here setlist. Waters modified the lyrics in some parts, transposed the key to suit both Gilmour's and his vocals, and re-titled it "Dogs". The version on Animals is 17 minutes long.

The main theme features what were, for Pink Floyd, rather unusual chords. In the final version's key of D minor, the chords are D minor ninth, E♭maj7 sus2 /B♭, Asus2sus4, and A♭sus2(♯11). All these chords contain the tonic of the song, D—even as a tritone, as is the case in the fourth chord.

The song fades in with an acoustic guitar in D tuning strumming the chords with a lively, syncopated rhythm, with a droning Farfisa organ playing chord tones (A, B♭, A, and A♭, respectively). After the first sixteen-bar progression, Gilmour begins the vocal. For the third repetition, bass guitar, Hammond organ, drums and lead guitar (playing a subtle drone of D) enter. After this repetition comes the first of several guitar solos, played by Gilmour on a Fender Telecaster rather than his usual Fender Stratocaster. Next is another verse of lyrics, followed by a keyboard solo. Finally, after six repetitions of the main theme, the tempo is cut in half (and thus dramatically slower). A new chord progression is introduced, resolving gradually to the relative major, F major, with two lead guitars loudly playing a slow harmonized melody, and a quieter third guitar adding decorative string bends, with heavy use of reverb and echo.

The song is then stripped back down to acoustic guitar, droning on the Dm9 chord, with the bass softly striking E, the ninth of the chord, in the same range as the guitar's lowest note, D. Another slash chord movement follows, B♭ to C/B♭, followed by the key's dominant, A major, with the minor sixth heard first at the top of the chord, in an A(add♭6), and later, as its bass note (in a progression of A, A/F, A/E, to D minor). After another guitar solo over the new progression, Gilmour sings a melismatic vocal with overdubbed harmonies from Richard Wright, ending with the lyric "So have a good drown/As you go down all alone/Dragged down by the stone", as the dissonant A/F leads back to Dm9.

The mesmeric middle section, in a slow, metronomic 6/4 time, is built upon several layers of synthesizers, sustaining the four chords of the main theme, with the sound of dogs barking processed through a vocoder and played as an instrument. (One dog moan is excerpted from the group's earlier recording "Seamus".) Gilmour's last word, "stone", echoes slowly for many measures, gradually fading out (it reappears later in the instrumental section of "Sheep"). There are no guitars in this section, however in the background is some slow and quiet drumming and cymbal tapping from Nick Mason. Gradually, a synthesizer solo emerges, and as it reaches its climax, the acoustic guitar returns, at the original tempo, once again lively and syncopated.

The formula of the first section is followed, but this time with Waters singing the lead. A third guitar solo ends in three-part harmony, playing descending augmented triads, leading to Gilmour's slow, harmonized guitar melody in F major, in a section of music indistinguishable from its first appearance in the song. This leads to the final verse, with Waters singing a new, repeating melody and a sixteen-line anaphora, where each line begins with the words "who was." Originally sung over the tonic only, in the final recording the multiple harmonized guitars alternate between D minor and C major, while the bass further extends the harmony with a descending F, E, D, and C, creating the sense of an F sixth chord followed by C/E. Originally, the lyrics sung by Waters ("Who was born in a house full of pain", etc.) were echoed shortly after by Gilmour and Wright harmonising with each other simultaneously. This was done in a round style, with Gilmour singing the upper harmony and Wright singing the lower harmony. In the final recording, only the last few lyrics are repeated ("Who was breaking away from the pack", etc.) but with Waters himself singing the repeated lines, using tape delay. This section resolves first to B♭, then to A, before concluding with the A, F, E bass movement to a sustained Dm9, as the lyrics again end with "dragged down by the stone".

"Dogs" is the only song on Animals in which Gilmour sings a lead part or receives a co-writing credit.

== Concept ==
Fitting into the album's Orwellian concept of comparing human behaviour to various animals, "Dogs" concentrates on the aggressive, ruthlessly competitive world of business, describing a high-powered businessman. The first two verses detail his predatory nature—outwardly charming and respectable with his "club tie and a firm handshake, a certain look in the eye and an easy smile", while behind this façade he lies waiting "to pick out the easy meat...to strike when the moment is right", and to stab those who trust him in the back. Subsequent verses portray the emptiness of his existence catching up to him as he grows older, retiring to the south rich but unloved: "just another sad old man, all alone and dying of cancer", and drowning under the weight of a metaphorical stone.

The final verse explores a number of aspects of business life and how it compares to dogs, for example taking chances and being "trained not to spit in the fan", losing their individuality ("broken by trained personnel"), obeying their superiors ("fitted with collar and chain"), being rewarded for good behaviour ("given a pat on the back"), working harder than the other workers ("breaking away from the pack") and getting to know everyone but spending less time with family ("only a stranger at home"). Recommended by a friend of Waters named Joel Eaves, this line was personal to him as he was split from his family at infancy, being "broken away", as he put it. He later joined the Air Force squadron known as "Wolfpack", which directly inspired the implementation of this line. Every line of this verse begins with the words "Who was", which prompted comparison to Allen Ginsberg's poem "Howl". However, Waters has denied the Ginsberg poem was any influence on his lyrics. Instead, these lines can be seen as subordinate clauses to the lyric line that precedes them ("And you believe at heart everyone's a killer/Who was born in a house full of pain/Who was [etc.]").

== Early versions ==
During 1974 performances of "You've Got to Be Crazy", which can be heard on the Immersion Box Set and the Experience version of Wish You Were Here, the band performed the song faster than it would eventually become, and in its original key of E minor, before they started using D tuning on their guitars, for a concert pitch of D minor. In the early live versions of Dogs/You've Got To Be Crazy from 1974, the mesmeric solo was dominated by Rick's clanging and airy Farfisa Organ sounds and clanging and echoing electric piano and was substantially shorter than the reworked and completed version. In the background was gentle cymbal tapping from Nick Mason and some gentle electric guitar picking from Dave Gilmour in the first half of this section backed by equally gentle bass guitar picking from Roger Waters. Rick Wright's mesmeric solo from the middle of Dogs/You've Got To Be Crazy is notable by its absence from Pink Floyd's 1975 Tour. The lyrics, though different in 1974, were thematically similar to the final version of "Dogs". The lyrics were modified by the time the song was played live in 1975, and then the lyrics changed again when recording Animals.

Once in a while I would find something uncomfortable to sing. The first lot Roger wrote for "Dogs" when it was called "You Gotta Be Crazy", were just too many words to sing. ... "Dogs" had so many words, I physically couldn't get them in. [We] just cut out two-thirds of his words, to make it possible rather than impossible.

Equally difficult was for Gilmour or Waters to sing the song's highest part, "dragged down by the stone", in the original key, which would begin on the first B above middle C. As any recording of the early performances will attest, neither singer could quite reach and sustain it, even when attempting it together. The line appears twice, as the climax to each singer's performance. It was likely for the sake of achieving high-quality lead vocals, specifically on this line, that they lowered the key before committing the song to record (Waters, however, would go on to reach even higher notes on songs like "Hey You", "Every Stranger's Eyes" and "One of My Turns").

The bootleg release From Abbey Road to Britannia Row: The Extraction Tapes (2014) includes a work-in-progress studio version of "Dogs." This version is closer musically to the official album version than the earlier "You've Got to Be Crazy" live versions, but it has distinct differences. Unlike the album version, it is sung almost entirely by Waters; Gilmour sings only the middle section ("And when you lose control..."). The mesmeric synthesizer solo (with barking dog effects) is missing (accounting for the track's duration of just under 14 minutes, in contrast to the 17-minute version on Animals), and some of the lyrics are different, most notably in the closing "Who was..." verse.

== Live versions ==
The song was performed nightly during the 1977 tour. Gilmour would sing all but the last section with Gilmour and Wright harmonizing during the "And when you lose control" part. Gilmour played his acoustic parts on electric guitar, making it easy to switch between lead and rhythm with his Telecaster played in D standard tuning. Some solos were different from the studio version and before the final guitar solo Gilmour would perform an extra solo. Waters would sing the "who was born in a house full of pain" section. Then for the last part, Waters would sing "breaking away from the pack" with Gilmour and Wright singing a round (similarly to performances on the 1974/75 Gotta Be Crazy tour) and both Gilmour and Waters singing the final "who was dragged down by the stone".

Waters regularly performed the song on his In the Flesh Tour, with Jon Carin and Doyle Bramhall II replacing Gilmour on vocals and guitars, respectively. Waters also performed the song to open the second set of his Us + Them Tour shows, with Dave Kilminster and Jonathan Wilson on guitars, and the latter on vocals. However, despite Wilson replacing Gilmour's role on vocals during this tour, the sample of Gilmour's voice echoing the word "stone" from the original studio recording was utilized on a backing track during the middle section.

== Cover versions ==
Les Claypool's Frog Brigade performed and released a live version of "Dogs" on the album Live Frogs Set 2 (2001). The entire album is a complete performance of Pink Floyd's Animals album, recorded in October 2000.

== Personnel ==
- David Gilmour – lead vocals (first half), acoustic and electric guitar, drum overdubs (first solo)
- Roger Waters – bass guitar, lead and harmony vocals (second half), vocoder
- Richard Wright – Fender Rhodes electric piano, Hammond organ, Minimoog, Solina String Ensemble, Farfisa organ, harmony vocals (first half)
- Nick Mason – drums, percussion
