= The Other Side of Time =

Studio album by Mary Fahl
- Released: May 27, 2003
- Genre: Folk, celtic, world
- Length: 61:21
- Language: English, Italian, Mozarabic
- Label: Odyssey
- Producer: Mychael Danna, Jeffrey Lesser, David Tickle

Mary Fahl chronology
Lenses of Contact (2001)	The Other Side of Time (2003)	From the Dark Side of the Moon (2011)

The Other Side of Time is the debut solo album from the American singer-songwriter Mary Fahl, released on May 27, 2003 by the newly formed Sony Odyssey label. The album reached No. 22 on the Billboard Heatseekers chart and No. 269 on Billboard'sTop Internet Albums.

== History ==
After performing as a solo artist in the late 90s and releasing the EP Lenses of Contact in 2001, Fahl was signed with Sony Classical.

Upon finding out Sony Classical would be releasing the soundtrack to the film Gods and Generals, Fahl researched the story and wrote the song "Going Home" on speculation.

Three of the songs from Lenses of Contact were featured in The Other Side of Time, and two songs would figure prominently on film soundtracks. "Going Home" appeared in the opening of Gods and Generals; the album's closing track, Fahl's version of the traditional Irish tune "The Dawning of the Day," was featured in The Guys, along with several reprises of the song.

The Other Side of Time showed some additional sides to Fahl's style, bringing in opera styles in "Una furtiva lagrima" and Middle Eastern influences in "Ben Aindi Habibi". These two tracks, which Fahl sang in Italian and Mozarabic respectively, were the first non-English language songs to appear on her records. "Ben Aindi Habibi" was a traditional kharja written in the 11th or 12th century. Fahl said in an interview that she had discovered "Ben Aindi Habibi" while on tour with the October Project and considered it her favorite song on The Other Side of Time.

In an interview with Liane Hansen of National Public Radio, Fahl stated that she performed these songs on The Other Side of Time because she was signed to a classical label and a pop label would not have let her make that type of record.

"Paolo" was written in 1997, one of the first songs she'd composed, and is considered by Fahl to be the most autobiographical of her repertoire.

"The Dawning of the Day" was written for the film adaptation of The Guys in honor of the firefighters who died in the September 11 attacks. The film's director, Jim Simpson, stipulated that the song sound like it was written 300 years ago. Fahl wrote the lyrics within the two-day deadline. Fahl admits to being moved to tears while writing the lyrics.

Fahl wrote her lyrics to "The Dawning of the Day" to honor firefighters who died in the September 11, 2001 attacks. The song would later be performed by Ronan Tynan at the re-opening dedication for the Seven World Trade Center in 2006.

== Reception ==
Professional ratings
Review scores
Source	Rating
Allmusic	2/5 stars
Daily Vault	B+
Exposé	(mixed)
MusicTap	4/5 stars
PopMatters	(mixed)

Overall, The Other Side of Time met with mixed reviews. Film Score Monthly called her "a brasher, more exciting version of Enya and Sissel" and concluded, "Mary Fahl, thankfully, is not your typical pop singer. Somewhat unwieldy, but always interesting. More filmmakers should pay attention to the vocal talent on display in this CD." The All-Music Guide praised her past work with the October Project and her first solo EP but gave her only 2 out of 5 stars for The Other Side of Time, saying, "She still has the big voice, but she's opting for an easier course of being eclectic by tossing faint nods at different styles while trying to hew firmly to the center of the road.... This just ends up being a bland waste of a mighty talent."

After listening to the first four tracks of the album, MusicTap's Matt Rowe described himself as "mesmerized," comparing Fahl's "entrancing voice" to that of Lisa Gerrard's of Dead Can Dance fame. He found the majority of the album rich with "philosophical lyrics" and "spiritual airing," calling Fahl a "unique talent" on a "quest for answers that emulate the basic need of man to know things usually beyond our understanding."

== Track list ==
No.	Title	Writer(s)	Length
1.	"In the Great Unknown"	Mary Fahl, Glenn Patscha, Byron Isaacs	4:41
2.	"Going Home"	Fahl	4:48
3.	"Want To"	Fahl, Scott Healy	4:32
4.	"Ben Aindi Habibi"	Aurora Moreno, Esteban Valdivieso	4:06
5.	"Redemption"	Ramsey McLean, Fahl	4:43
6.	"Paolo"	Fahl, Bob Riley	4:32
7.	"Una furtiva lagrima" (from L'elisir d'amore)	Gaetano Donizetti	3:49
8.	"The Other Side of Time"	Fahl, Stephen Schwartz	4:11
9.	"Raging Child"	Fahl, Riley, Joel Moss	4:25
10.	"Annie, Roll Down Your Window"	Fahl, Patscha, Isaacs, Jeffrey Lesser	3:58
11.	"The Station"	Fahl, Patscha, Isaacs	4:43
12.	"Kindness Can Be Cruel"	McLean, Fahl	4:18
13.	"Dream of You"	Fahl, Patscha, Isaacs	3:44
14.	"The Dawning of the Day" (Lyrics by Mary Fahl)	Irish Traditional	4:34

== Personnel ==
Musicians and vocalists

- Rob Mathes – piano, electric guitar, keyboards
- Dennis McDermott – drums
- Mark O'Connor – violin, soloist
- Shawn Pelton – drums, drum Loop
- Larry Saltzman – electric guitar
- Jimi Zhivago – electric guitar
- James McCollum – guitar
- Paul Intson – bass (upright)
- Alan Hewitt (musician) – percussion, keyboards
- Glenn Patscha – piano, background vocals, keyboards
- Alvin Young – bass
- Henry Aronson – piano
- David Berger – drums
- Byron Isaacs – bass, bowed bass, background vocals, guitar
- Fiona McBain – background vocals
- Pamelia Kurstin – theremin, soloist
- Mary Fahl – vocals
- Iki Levy – percussion, drum loop
- Tony Garnier – bass
- Kevin Kuhn – guitar
- John Lissauer – bass, guitar, conductor, keyboards, choir, dholak, shruti box, orchestral arrangements, talking drum, shaker, engineer, tambourine, harmonium, percussion
- Mark Egan – electric bass
- Glenn Alexander – acoustic guitar, guitar
- Ramsey McLean – guitar
- Oren Bloedow – guitar
- Richard Locker – cello, soloist, orchestra
- Scott Healy – piano, keyboards
- Paul Cremo – electric guitar, executive producer

Production

- Mychael Danna – arranger, producer
- Ed Rak – engineer
- David Tickle – record producer, remixing
- David Wilkes – artist consultant
- Brad Haehnel – engineer
- Ron Searles – engineer
- Jeffrey Lesser – mixing, engineer, producer, background vocals
- Janush Kawa – photography
- Nick Vaccaro – photography
- Anthony Ruotolo – associate engineer
- Keith Shortreed – digital editing
- Jan Folkson – engineer, digital editing, metal shaker
- Ian Cuttler – art direction
- Ricardo Fernandez – associate engineer
- Robert Nowak – copyist
- Robin Pitre – copyist
- Dan Abernathy – associate engineer
- Edmund Cionek – copyist
- Ruth DeSarno – A&R assistance
- Nic Hard – engineer
- Erich Trusheim – associate engineer
- Jeremy Welch – associate engineer
- Joshua Benezra – intern
- Anne Atalla – A&R

Orchestra

- Karen Milne
- John Moses
- Joe Passaro
- Sue Pray
- Jim Saporito
- Laura Seaton
- Kirk Worthington – cello
- Dale Stuckenbruck
- Maxine Roach
- Sarah Adams
- Rick Dolan
- Richard Clark
- Caryl Paisner
- Belinda Whitney
- Helen Campo
- Ken Barward Hoy
- Don McGeen
- Xin Zhao
- Adam Grabois
- Laura Oatts
- Stacy Shames
- Larry Di Bello
- David Earl Taylor
- Shelly Holland-Moritz
- Natalie Cenovia Cummins
- Elizabeth Lim Dutton
- Robert Bush
- Leise Paer
- John Miller – conductor
- Mark Sherman
- Martin Agee
- Dennis Anderson
- Randy Andos
- Joseph Bongiorno
- H. Robert Carlisle
- Barry Finclair
- Joyce Hammann
- Karl Kawahara
- Jeanne LeBlanc

== Charts ==
Chart (2003)	Peak position
Billboard Heatseekers	#22
Billboard Top Internet Albums	#269
