= Mary Fahl =

American singer, songwriter and actress (born 1958)

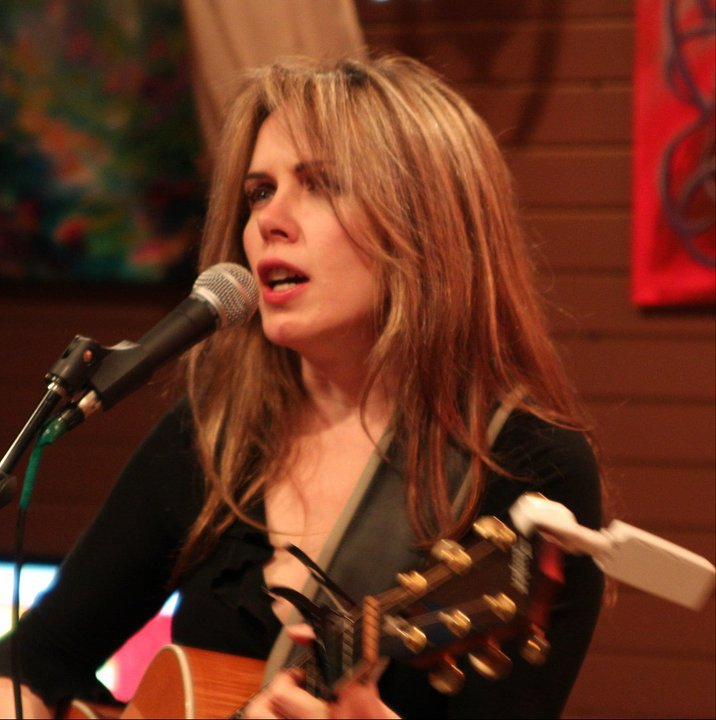

Background information
- Born: Mary Faldermeyer; July 1, 1958 (age 67)
- Origin: Rockland County, NY, U.S.
- Genres: Adult Contemporary music, folk, world
- Occupations: Singer, songwriter, guitarist, actress
- Years active: 1990–1996 (group); 2001–present (solo); 2003–present (acting)
- Labels: Epic; Sony Classical; V2
- Website: MaryFahl.com

Mary Fahl (born Mary Faldermeyer, July 1, 1958) is an American singer, songwriter and actress known for her work with October Project in the mid-1990s. Subsequently she became known for her solo singing and acting career. She released an EP Lenses of Contact in 2001, and a full album The Other Side of Time in 2003 on Sony Classical. From the Dark Side of the Moon, was released on May 10, 2011. She teamed up with producer John Lissauer, who also produced Leonard Cohen's "Hallelujah," for her fifth full-length album, Love & Gravity, released in 2014. She released Can't Get it out of My Head, an album of covers, in 2022.

Her music has been featured in the film Gods and Generals, as well as the film version of the play The Guys. She also wrote the theme song, "Exiles: The Wolves of Midwinter," for the audiobook version of Anne Rice's novel The Wolves of Midwinter, which was released on Oct. 15. 2013.

== Early life, education ==
Mary Fahl was born Mary Faldermeyer in Rockland County, New York on July 1, 1958. She was raised in a large Irish/German family in Stony Point, New York; Fahl has stated that as a child she used to sing along with her older sibling's records to practice her voice. She formed her first makeshift recording studio in the household bathroom. She attended Albertus Magnus High School, and graduated from North Rockland High School. She later attended McGill University to study medieval literature.

After graduating, Fahl and her sister left the United States to spend 1½ years in Europe; she said that she received an "informal graduate degree in music" by checking out vinyl records at a library in the Netherlands and listening to and analyzing them. She also earned money by house-sitting and singing in cafes.

== October Project ==
In 1990, Fahl briefly considered attending a post-grad pre-med program at Columbia University. Upon returning to New York City, she was introduced to lyricist Julie Flanders by a friend. Flanders introduced Fahl to Flanders' collaborator and boyfriend Emil Adler, a composer. Together with guitarist Dave Sabatino they formed the early incarnation of the band October Project, with Fahl handling lead vocals. Fahl stated they "rehearsed forever, a year and a half sort of finding where we were." They soon added vocalist Marina Belica and began touring the coffee house scene with their original music, eventually releasing their self-titled debut in 1993 on Epic Records. They released a second full album, Falling Farther In, in 1995 on Epic, and the album made it to the Billboard 200. The group toured with acts such as Sarah McLachlan and Crash Test Dummies. The group disbanded in 1996, reforming in 2001 with Belica (lead vocals), Flanders and Adler.

While she was the lead singer of the October Project, the media occasionally depicted Fahl as "a goddess of Goth, a figure admired by followers of the vampire movement." Fahl, however, has stated she does not identify as Goth. She has theorized that because she had little money at the time, leaving her unable to afford any more than one black dress, and chiefly wore that one black dress to all her public appearances, the media misinterpreted her image.

== Commercial work ==
After leaving October Project, Fahl spent time earning a living by working in the commercial world. She has also voiced spots for Audi, Crystal Light, Russell Athletic, and Fisher-Price.

== Solo career ==
After leaving October Project, Fahl embarked on a solo career. As a solo artist, she writes her own songs, usually in collaboration with other musicians.

=== Lenses of Contact (2001) ===
Fahl released an EP, Lenses of Contact, in early 2000 for Rough Mix Records. It featured four songs: "Raging Child", "Paolo", "Meant to Say", and "Redemption"; the title of the EP came from a line in "Paolo". The EP contained elements of folk music, rock 'n' roll, and pop. Jeffrey Lesser, a producer/engineer who has previously worked with Barbra Streisand, Joni Mitchell, Lou Reed, and The Chieftains, produced the EP. She toured to promote the EP backed a by a five-piece band of rock musicians. Many of the members of her newly formed backing band later became the band Ollabelle.

Reviews

The EP was released to favorable reviews. Allmusic gave it 4½ out of 5 stars. They compared her to Mitchell and Judy Collins, although noting that she belted more than Mitchell, and concluded, "This promising solo debut demonstrates that Fahl is a very spiritual and moving storyteller in her own right."

In a live review of a Lenses of Contact show, Billboard stated "while her former band was sometimes categorized as new age, progressive, or art rock because of its classical leanings, the solo Fahl has her feet firmly planted in classic rock, pop, and folk terrain."

The New York Press wrote the EP "makes us embarrassed for both the mincing stampede of girl singers on the charts and for Fahl herself, who actually cares enough to sing, literally, from her guts, while daringly carving every phrase into dizzying terrain."

=== The Other Side of Time (2003) ===
Shortly after 9/11, Fahl auditioned with a compilation of demo material for executives at Sony Classical in New York, including Peter Gelb. She earned an album contract, and after several months working on material in studio, released her first full-length album in winter 2003. The Other Side of Time had 14 songs in all (three of which were originally featured on Lenses of Contact). She shares writing credits on 12 of the 14 tracks on album. It was again produced and engineered by Jeffrey Lesser, formerly responsible for her EP. Fahl toured across the country in support of the album's release.

Two songs on the album featured prominently on soundtracks. "Going Home" was written by Fahl to appear in the opening of the Civil War film Gods and Generals. The album's closing track, Fahl's version of the traditional Irish tune "The Dawning of the Day," was featured in the film version of the Broadway play The Guys, along with several reprises of the song.

Style, themes

Fahl wrote her lyrics to "The Dawning of the Day" to honor firefighters who died in the September 11, 2001, attacks. Ronan Tynan performed the song at the re-opening dedication for the Seven World Trade Center.

The Other Side of Time showed some additional sides to Fahl's style, bringing in opera styles in "Una furtiva lagrima" and Middle Eastern influences in "Ben Aindi Habibi". These two tracks, which Fahl sang in Italian and Mozarabic respectively, were the first non-English language songs to appear on her records. "Ben Aindi Habibi" was a traditional kharja written in the 11th century. Fahl said in an interview that she had discovered "Ben Aindi Habibi" while on tour with October Project and considered it her favorite song on The Other Side of Time. In an interview with Liane Hansen of National Public Radio, Fahl stated that she performed these songs on The Other Side of Time because she was signed to a classical label and a pop label would not have let her make that type of record.

Reviews

Overall, The Other Side of Time met with largely positive reviews. The Salt Lake Tribune gave the Other Side of Time an "A" grade in a review, and Film Score Monthly called her "a brasher, more exciting version of Enya and Sissel" and concluded "Mary Fahl, thankfully, is not your typical pop singer. Somewhat unwieldy, but always interesting. More filmmakers should pay attention to the vocal talent on display in this CD."

A live Boston Globe review from August 2003 stated "Fahl has a voice for the gods. It is a compelling operatic pop instrument that can transport listeners to other realms. Her new album, The Other Side of Time, is a fascinating if sometimes slightly stiff mix of orchestral pop and riveting Celtic stylings a la Sandy Denny of Fairport Convention, with occasional hints of Sinéad O'Connor." A live review from June 13, 2003, show stated the concert "let loose Fahl's deep, almost operatic vocal range. Usually such stylized music doesn't lend itself to variation...Fahl broke free of all stylistic restraints."

A July 2003 review stated that Fahl is "Most certainly an Artist of the highest caliber," and "this is not rock and roll. No dance moves or funky grooves, either. She is unlike any other popular performer today. Her lyrics are deeper and richer, like a Marc Cohn or a less self-involved Joni Mitchell. Her voice is a real treat, though. It is a force of nature, pulling you along as she rages against the heavens in full throttle; or softly, intimately singing to a private part of your soul that only she knew was there."

All-Music Guide praised her past work with October Project and her first solo EP but gave her only 2 out of 5 stars for The Other Side of Time, saying, "She still has the big voice, but she's opting for an easier course of being eclectic by tossing faint nods at different styles while trying to hew firmly to the center of the road."

=== From the Dark Side of the Moon (2011) ===
As of September 2006 Fahl completed the recording of From the Dark Side of the Moon, produced by Mark Doyle and David Werner and mixed by Bob Clearmountain. Doyle also provided nearly all of the instrumentation. The album is a song-by-song "re-imagining" of Pink Floyd's classic album The Dark Side of the Moon. Advance copies were not sent out, and the album remained unreleased for several years after V2 Records went out of business right before her release. Fahl self-released the album on May 10, 2011.

Reception

Publication Nippertown referred to the album as "mindblowing," while The Morton Report called it "brilliant" and "a worthy re-interpretation not to be missed."

=== Love & Gravity (2014) ===
Fahl teamed up with producer John Lissauer, who also produced Leonard Cohen's "Hallelujah," for her fifth full-length album, Love & Gravity, a spare and meditative record about finding love later in life while maintaining a sense of optimism amid chaos.

=== Mary Fahl Live At The Mauch Chunk Opera House (2014) ===
Mary Fahl recorded this double disc live album on September 7, 2013, in the restored 1882 Mauch Chunk Opera House in Jim Thorpe, Pennsylvania. It was released on October 2, 2014.

=== O For a Muse of Fire ===
In March 2015, Fahl performed as the vocal soloist in the premiere performances of the symphonic overture O For a Muse of Fire by American composer Darryl Kubian. The work was commissioned by the New Jersey Symphony Orchestra, and is based on the play Henry V by William Shakespeare. Kubian composed the piece with Fahl's voice in mind, and the vocal part features select lines from Shakespeare's play.

The premiere performances was very well received, and met with positive reviews in the press. From Broadway World publication: "The overall composition is dramatic with flurries of vibrant musicality especially among the violins and brass. ... Mary Fahl has a dramatic, beautiful voice. This is a cinematic composition that builds steadily and majestically. One wishes Kubian had fleshed it out more. He will be a composer to keep one's eye on whether he pursues dramatic or cinema scores or continues in a classical venue." From The New Jersey Star Ledger: "As the composer noted in an articulate pre-performance introduction, the music dealt with the conscience of the king, exploring matters earthly and spiritual and taking on sounds of both warfare and contemplation. ... a cinematic fabric with deep lower strings and soaring brass. Dissonant threads in sustained chords and warlike percussion contrasted warm, meditative passages. In an earthy alto, vocalist Mary Fahl sang passages of Shakespeare text and keened wordlessly in the work's more impassioned moments. A waterphone added an otherworldly tinge before a frenetic rise and the pound of battle drums led to a fittingly heroic conclusion."

=== Can't Get it out of My Head (2022) ===
In 2022, Fahl released Can't Get it out of My Head. It features a range of covers including the Rolling Stone's Ruby Tuesday, Pink Floyd's Comfortably Numb, and Nick Drake's River Man. Her tours promoting it continued through 2025.

== Musical style, influences ==
Fahl has stated that she grew up listening heavily to her brothers' Bob Dylan and Pink Floyd records, as well as her sisters' Joni Mitchell and Dusty Springfield albums. She's specifically cited Joni Mitchell as being highly influential in her music. She's also referenced Nico and various film scores. Reviewers regularly have compared her to Enya, saying "both have a vocal grace and rich melodic sense that verges on Classical Music." Fahl has stated she and Enya are not really alike, as Enya is a mezzo-soprano, while Fahl's voice is "earthier, a dusky contralto. Her sound is more wordless vocals, my material is much more rooted in the storytelling, singer/songwriter tradition."

== Theater ==
After the release of The Other Side of Time, Fahl acted in a production of Murder Mystery Blues, a comedy which is based on short stories by Woody Allen. Fahl and the other actors also served as musicians who performed the play's score. The play was originally performed at The Warehouse Theater in London and later moved to a theater in New York City.

== Personal life ==
Fahl currently lives in Easton, Pennsylvania and is married to deep-sea oceanographer and marine biologist Richard A. Lutz.

== Discography ==
=== Collaborations ===
- October Project, October Project (1993)
- Falling Farther In, October Project (1996)

=== Solo career ===
Lenses of Contact EP (2000)
No.	Title	Length
1.	"Raging Child" (with Moss/Riley)	4:36
2.	"Paolo" (with Riley)	4:34
3.	"Meant to Say" (with Healy/Moss)	3:37
4.	"Redemption" (with McLean)	4:52

The Other Side of Time (2003)
No.	Title	Length
1.	"In The Great Unknown"	4:44
2.	"Going Home" (used on Gods and Generals)	4:56
3.	"Want To"	4:34
4.	"Ben Aindi Habibi"	4:08
5.	"Redemption"	4:46
6.	"Paolo"	4:33
7.	"Una Furtiva Lagrima"	3:50
8.	"Other Side of Time"	4:13
9.	"Raging Child"	4:25
10.	"Annie Roll Down Your Window"	3:58
11.	"Station"	4:43
12.	"Kindness Can Be Cruel"	4:20
13.	"Dream of You"	3:44
14.	"Dawning of the Day"	4:35

From the Dark Side of the Moon (2011)
No.	Title	Length
1.	"Speak to Me"	1:13
2.	"Breathe"	3:01
3.	"On the Run"	3:23
4.	"Time"	6:52
5.	"The Great Gig in the Sky"	4:58
6.	"Money"	6:12
7.	"Us and Them"	7:13
8.	"Any Colour You Like"	3:35
9.	"Brain Damage"	3:54
10.	"Eclipse"	2:00

Love & Gravity (2014)
No.	Title	Length
1.	"Exiles (The Wolves of Midwinter)"	4:26
2.	"How Much Love"	4:11
3.	"Gravity (Move Mountains, Turn Rivers Around)"	5:05
4.	"Everything's Gonna Be Alright"	3:12
5.	"Both Sides Now"	4:38
6.	"Siren"	3:37
7.	"Like Johnny Loved June"	4:14
8.	"Cottonwood"	4:06
9.	"Dawning of the Day"	3.55
10.	"Meant To Be"	2:16

Mary Fahl Live at the Mauch Chunk Opera House (Disc 1) (2014)
No.	Title	Length
1.	"Deep As You Go"	4:47
2.	"Like Johnny Loved June"	4:26
3.	"Gravity (Move Mountains, Turn Rivers Around)"	4:34
4.	"Return To Me"	4:14
5.	"Ben Aindi Habibi"	4:11
6.	"Siren"	3:54
7.	"Falling Further In"	5:32
8.	"Wild Is The Wind"	3:23
9.	"Us And Them"	6:58
10.	"Brain Damage/Eclipse"	5:57

Mary Fahl Live at the Mauch Chunk Opera House (Disc 2) (2014)
No.	Title	Length
1.	"Going Home"	4:38
2.	"Bury My Lovely"	3:54
3.	"The Station"	4:18
4.	"Both Sides Now"	4:53
5.	"Take Me As I Am"	5:00
6.	"Dream Of You"	3:42
7.	"Exiles (The Wolves Of Midwinter)"	4:38
8.	"Nessun Dorma"	2:29
9.	"Dawning Of The Day"	4:07
10.	"Meant To Be"	2:29
11.	"Everything's Gonna Be Alright"	3:55
12.	"La Vie En Rose"	1:55
13.	"Be My Hero"	5:25

Winter Songs & Carols (2019)
No.	Title	Length
1.	"Wexford Carol"	4:30
2.	"Urge For Going"	5:20
3.	"In The Bleak Midwinter"	3:26
4.	"What Child Is This"	3:40
5.	"Christmas Time Is Here"	5:00
6.	"Ave Maria"	4:00
7.	"Walking In The Air"	3:42
8.	"No End"	3:47
9.	"Have Yourself A Merry Little Christmas"	3:26
10.	"Winter Lady"	2:34
11.	"O Holy Night/Silent Night"	3:08

=== Compilations ===
- Gods & Generals Soundtrack (2003) – "Going Home"
- The Guys: Original Motion Picture Soundtrack (2003), Sony Classical – "The Dawning of the Day", "My Beautiful, Gleaming...", "What They Were Waiting For", "Patrick"
- Classics for a New Century (2003), Sony Classical – "Una furtiva lagrima"

== Videography ==
- "Going Home" (2003) – from The Other Side of Time
