= Izu–Ogasawara Trench =

Oceanic trench in the western Pacific

Coordinates: 29.650°N 142.683°E

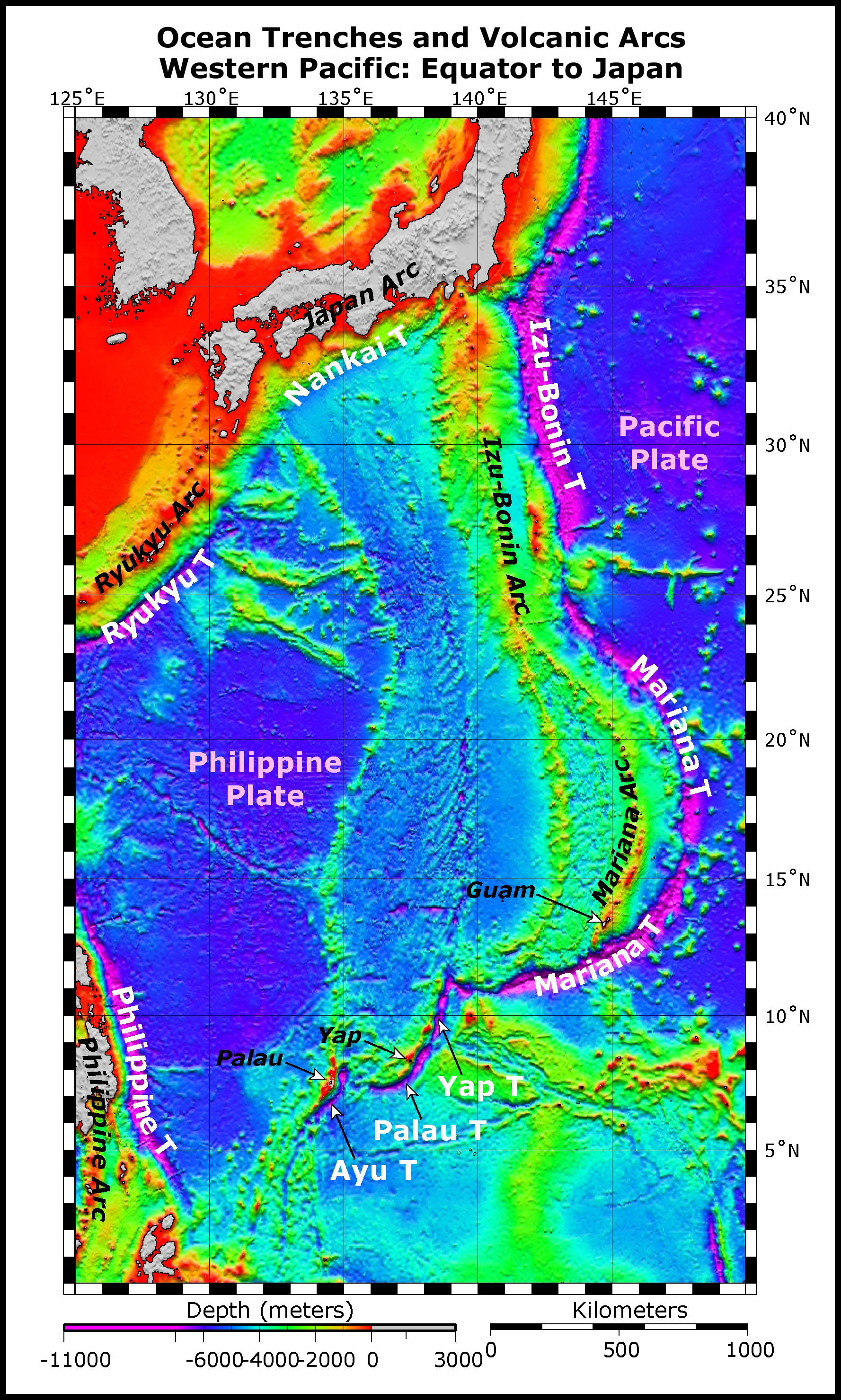
The Izu–Ogasawara Trench lies south of Japan

The Izu–Ogasawara Trench (伊豆・小笠原海溝, Izu–Ogasawara Kaikō), also known as Izu–Bonin Trench, is an oceanic trench in the western Pacific Ocean, consisting of the Izu Trench (at the north) and the Bonin Trench (at the south, west of the Ogasawara Plateau).

It stretches from Japan to the northernmost section of Mariana Trench. The Izu–Ogasawara Trench is an extension of the Japan Trench. Here, the Pacific plate is being subducted beneath the Philippine Sea plate, creating the Izu Islands and Bonin Islands on the Izu–Bonin–Mariana Arc system.

It is 9,826 metres (32,238 ft) +/- 11m at its deepest point and first dived to its base on August 13, 2022, during a joint Caladan Oceanic/University of Western Australia expedition in the Deep Submergence Vehicle Limiting Factor. The pilot on the mission was Victor Vescovo with scientific mission specialist Professor Katsuyoshi Michibayashi of Nagoya University. On this dive, Prof. Michibayashi became the deepest-diving Japanese person in history. Also in August 2022, the deepest fish ever recorded on camera was filmed in the trench, a juvenile snailfish, at a depth of 8,336 meters.

The xenophyophore Occultammina was first discovered at a depth of 8260 metres in the trench.

== See also ==
- Oceanic trench
- Izu–Bonin–Mariana Arc
