= October Project =

American pop rock band

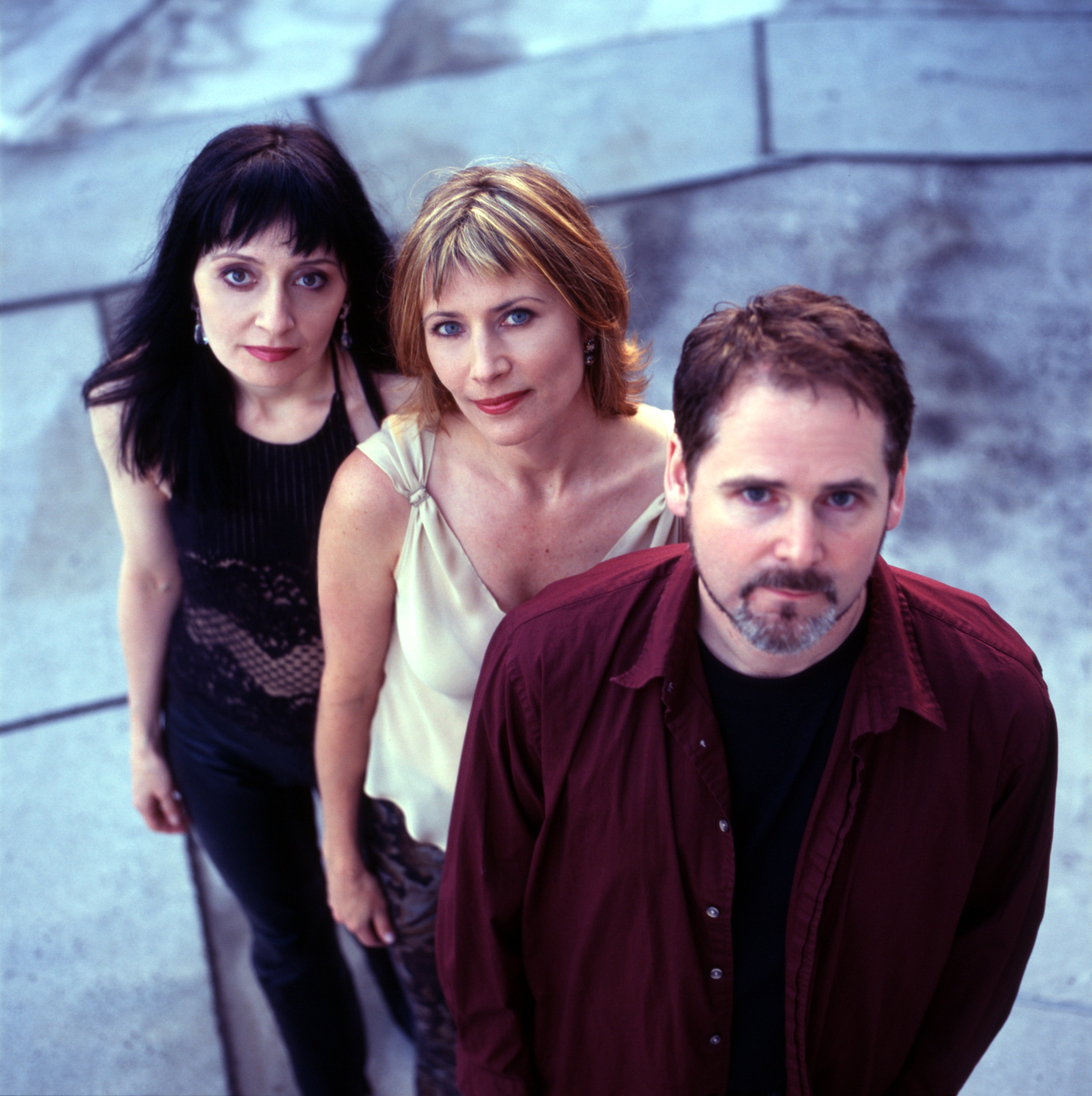
- (From left) Flanders, Belica, Adler

Background information
- Origin: New York City, New York, United States
- Genres: Pop rock, adult alternative
- Years active: 1991–1996; 2001–2006; 2010–present
- Label: Epic
- Spinoffs: November Project
- Members: Julie Flanders; Marina Belica; Emil Adler
- Past members: David Sabatino; Mary Fahl

October Project is an American pop rock band based in New York City. The group reached critical and commercial success with their 1990s Epic Records releases October Project and Falling Farther In.

The group's piano-driven music is characterized by close vocal harmonies. The band currently consists of lead vocalist Marina Belica, vocalist Julie Flanders, and keyboardist/vocalist Emil Adler. Flanders and Adler are the primary songwriters. Previous members include vocalist Mary Fahl and guitarist/vocalist David Sabatino. Sabatino occasionally still performs live with the band.

== Early stages ==
Flanders and Adler began writing songs together while still in their teens growing up in Montclair, NJ. Flanders and Belica met as dormitory roommates at Yale University in New Haven, CT. In their senior year they collaborated with Adler to write the musical revue Measure By Measure. In 1981 they were accepted as a team into the BMI Musical Theatre Workshop, studying first with Lehman Engel and then Maury Yeston. Other students in that class included Michael John LaChiusa and Gerard Alessandrini. Adler and Sabatino met at a jam session in New York City. At the time Adler was finishing his Master's thesis in music composition at Rutgers University. Together with their friend, Paul Byrne, they started a music production company, Tritone Productions. In 1985 they built a recording studio in a New Jersey garage, which Adler would eventually use to produce the first demo recordings of singer/songwriter Lee Feldman and Sufjan Stevens' college band, Marzuki. October Project would use the studio as its home base during its developmental phase. Flanders met Fahl in New York City and introduced her to Adler in the summer of 1989. October Project rose from that meeting. The band spent eighteen months in Tritone's garage studio refining their instrumentation and arrangements, and occasionally changing their configuration. The initial lineup (as of October 1989) included Paul Byrne (guitar) and Mark Huntley (drums/vocals). Byrne and Huntley left after a few months. Urbano Sanchez was later recruited as percussionist and was invited to join the band, but declined in favor of retaining sideman status. The band was without a name during its developmental phase. The name "October Project" was inspired by a folder with this label that Adler kept and that pertained to an upcoming performance opportunity. The band quickly earned a devoted following by playing regularly at many of the music clubs of downtown Manhattan, including the Speakeasy, the Sun Mountain Cafe, Beowulf, CB's 313 Gallery, and the Bitter End. Talent manager Peter Ciaccia saw the band performing at CBGB, and approached them to become their manager. They soon took up residence at the original Café Sin-é on St. Mark's Place, where they often played alongside other developing artists of the time, most notably Jeff Buckley.

== Major label ==
In 1993, the band was signed by Michael Caplan of Epic Records, a subsidiary of Sony BMG. In October of that year they released their first album, the eponymous October Project, recorded in Nashville, produced by Glenn Rosenstein and engineered by Jay Healy. The band toured throughout the US for much of 1994, opening for several acts, including the Crash Test Dummies and Sarah McLachlan, and appearing on Late Night with Conan O'Brien. They produced two music videos that year, one for each of their released singles, “Bury My Lovely” and “Return To Me.” The latter single was included in the soundtrack to the motion picture Blown Away, starring Tommy Lee Jones and Jeff Bridges. After a nine-city promotional tour of Europe the band returned to Nashville in early 1995 to record their second album, Falling Farther In, produced by Peter Collins and engineered by David Leonard. It was released in September 1995. A headlining tour of the US included additional players Julian Coryell (guitar), Kevin Jenkins (bass), and Craig Thatcher (drums). Among the artists who opened for October Project on that tour were Joy Askew, Jane Kelly Williams, and Once Blue (composed of Jesse Harris and Rebecca Martin). In June 1996 the band's contract with Epic was terminated without official explanation from the label. The band members decided to discontinue their mutual involvement.

== November Project ==
Songwriters Flanders and Adler formed a new band, November Project. The members were Mary Anne Marino (lead vocals), Julie Flanders (keyboard/vocals), Emil Adler (keyboard/vocals), Rob Friedman (guitar), Mike Visceglia (bass), and Doug Yowell (drums). The band was managed by Jeremy Morrison. In 1999, November Project released a five-song EP, A Thousand Days, co-produced by Adler and Friedman. In 2000, the group disbanded citing artistic differences. A full-length album, partially funded by fans through the band's web site, and co-produced by Adler and guitarist Gerry Leonard, was completed prior to the team's dissolution. The album was not released.

== October Project re-formed ==
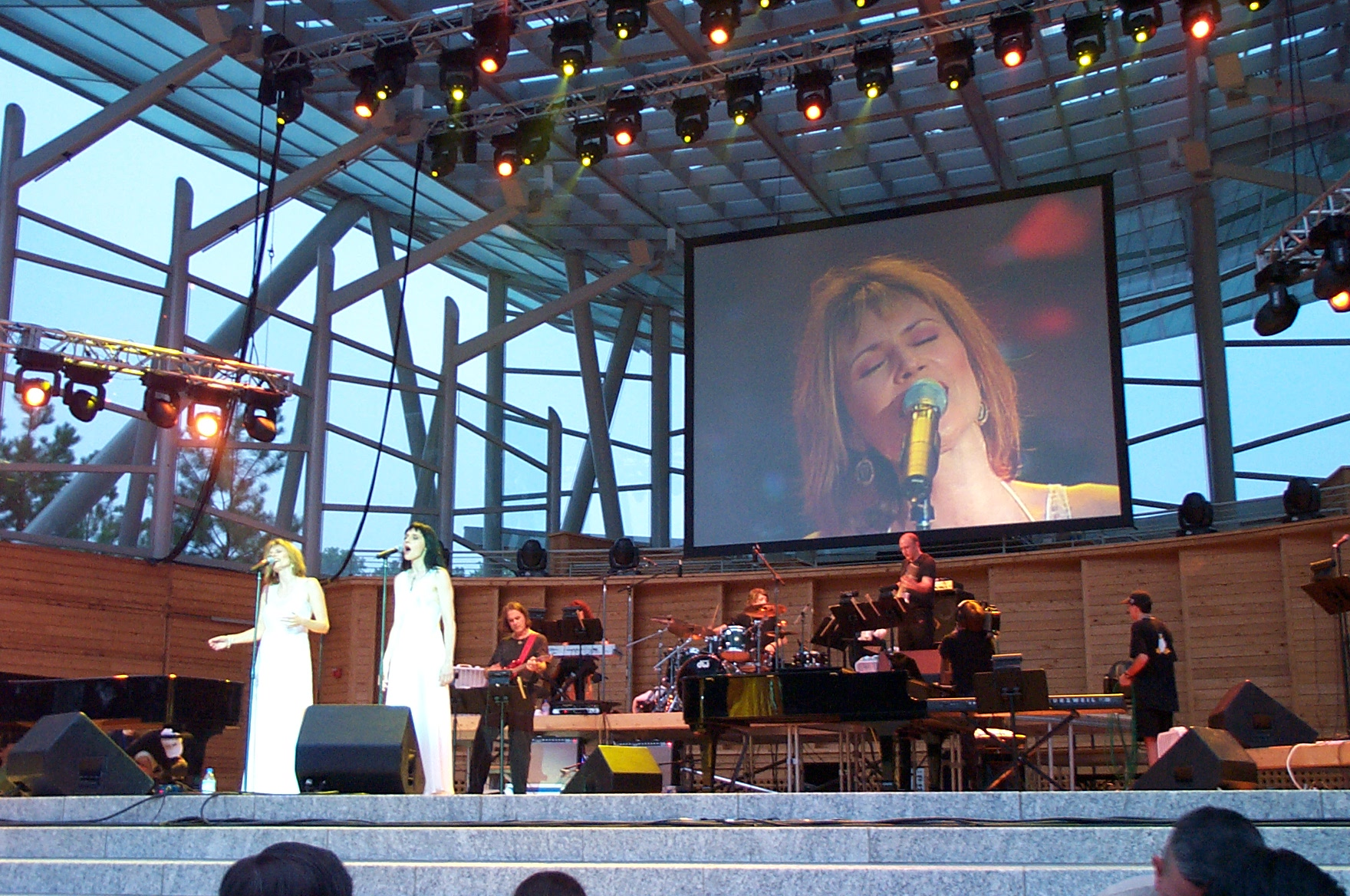
October Project in NC

After working together in the studio and performing at several venues as OP(iii), Flanders, Adler and Belica chose to reunite in 2001. In 2003, the band released Different Eyes, a six track EP featuring newly recorded songs that were originally written by Flanders and Adler in the 1990s.

In June 2006, a tribute album, October Project Covered, was released, featuring sixteen independent artists performing songs by Flanders and Adler. The band launched a new website in July 2010. In July 2011, the band performed two limited-capacity concerts at a private loft in SoHo, featuring Belica, Flanders, and Adler performing new and old songs along with various special guests. In December 2011, the band released Uncovered, a five track EP featuring new material, recorded in a stripped-down format featuring piano and vocals exclusively, with a bonus track of "Something More Than This," a song originally released on the band's second Epic Records release, Falling Farther In. According to the band, the material is meant to be experienced as a preview to an upcoming full-length release, which will feature many of the same songs, but with full instrumentation and arrangements. In March 2012, a companion disc was released, titled More Uncovered, which features more new material as well as an a cappella recording of "Eyes of Mercy," a song originally released on the band's self-titled Epic Records debut.

In November 2015, October Project released The Book of Rounds, a song cycle of 21 original musical rounds, with lyrics by Flanders and music by Adler. The album, which was published by Sounds True, features a specially selected choir and the voices of Flanders, Adler, and Belica. A review by Frederic and Mary Ann Brussat called the effort an "uplifting collection" that "stir the soul and enchant the mind with their beauty and meaning".

In response to the coronavirus pandemic, the group conducted a "Virtual Choir of Joy", which premiered in October 2020. The choir sang "Joy" from the Book of Rounds, and featured 163 participants from 23 countries. The video won a 2021 Telly Award.

In June 2021, the group released "The Book of Rounds: Choral Edition", featuring performances by Chorus Austin.

== Related developments ==
Marina Belica

In 2000, current lead vocalist Belica invited Flanders, Adler, Sabatino, and Sanchez to record a new version of October Project's first single, "Return to Me." The recording was sung by Belica with harmonies from Flanders, Adler and Sabatino, and was produced by Adler. The cover became the feature track of a five-song EP, decembergirl, released by Belica in 2000. This same recording was re-released by October Project on their sampler, Three, released in 2002. Belica also composed a full-length instrumental album, One Sky, released in 2003, produced by Randy Crafton and Chris Cunningham.

Julie Flanders

October Project's lyricist Flanders released her first book of poetry "Joyride" in October 2015, which became an Amazon Kindle top bestseller in the Women's Poetry category. "Joyride" was praised by poets Cynthia Zarin and David Howard, and by singer/songwriter Wesley Stace. Flanders' second book of poetry, titled "Shadow Breathing", was released in August 2018.

Mary Fahl

Former lead vocalist Fahl has been pursuing a career as a solo artist. Her writing collaborators have included Bob Riley, Ramsey McLean and Glenn Patscha. In 2001, she released Lenses of Contact, a four-song EP of her collaborations, produced by Jeffrey Lesser. Signed by Sony Classical, she released a full-length album, The Other Side of Time in 2003, also produced by Lesser. In 2006, Fahl recorded From the Dark Side of the Moon for V2 Records. The album, produced by Mark Doyle and David Werner, is an interpretation of Pink Floyd's The Dark Side of the Moon. Following the restructuring of V2, the album was put in storage for several years. It was released independently by Fahl in late 2011. In late 2013, Fahl released Love and Gravity. In late 2014 came the 2CD Live at the Mauch Chunk Opera House, and in 2016 Four Songs, a collection of Italian arias, available only through her website. 2019 saw Winter Songs And Carols, a collection of traditional Christmas music and seasonal pop songs. Can't Get It Out of My Head, a covers album featuring ten of her favorite songs, arrived in 2022.

== Discography ==
=== Studio albums ===
- October Project (1993)
- Falling Farther In (1995)
- The Book of Rounds (2015)
- The Book of Rounds: Choral Edition (2021)
- The Ghost of Childhood (2024)

=== EPs ===
- Be My Hero + 4 Live Acoustic (1994)
- Three (2002)
- Different Eyes (2003)
- Uncovered (2011)
- More Uncovered (2012)

=== Singles ===
The band's self-titled major-label debut album included these singles:

- "Bury My Lovely" (1993)
- "Wall of Silence" (1993)
- "Return To Me" (1994)
  - "Return to Me" is featured in the soundtrack of the 1994 film Blown Away, starring Jeff Bridges and Tommy Lee Jones, as well as in an episode of the popular 1990's syndicated television series, Baywatch. [See Season 5, Episode 3, titled "Aftershock."]

=== Compilations ===
- October Project Covered (2006)
