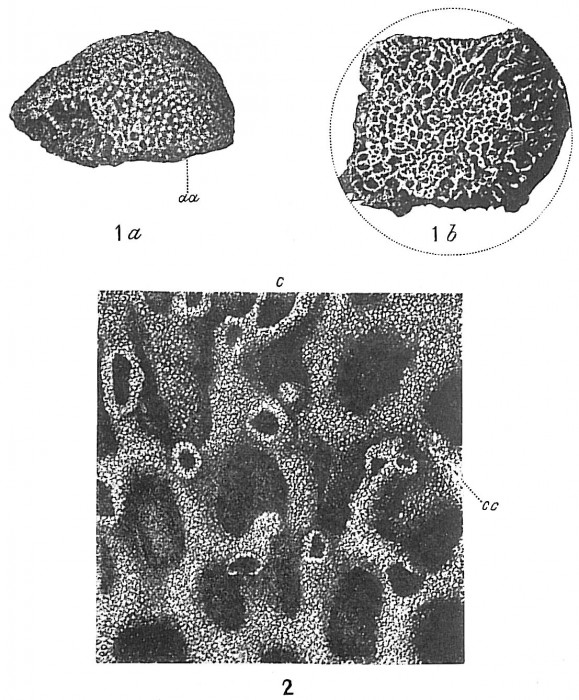

Scientific classification
- Domain: Eukaryota
- Clade: Sar
- Clade: Rhizaria
- Phylum: Retaria
- Subphylum: Foraminifera
- Class: Monothalamea
- Clade: Xenophyophorea
- Order: Psamminida
- Family: Syringamminidae
- Genus: Syringammina; Brady, 1883

Type species
- Syringammina fragilissima Brady, 1883

Species
- Syringammina corbicula; Syringammina limosa; Syringammina minuta; Syringammina reticulata; Syringammina tasmanensis

= Syringammina =

Genus of single-celled organisms

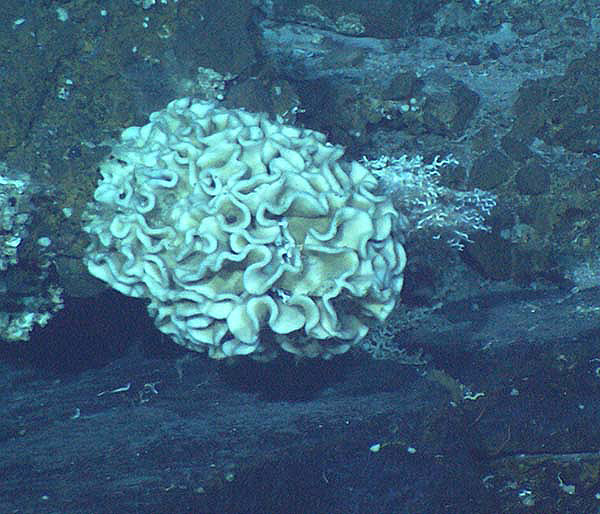
This image by NOAA Office of Ocean Exploration and Research of a deep sea Xenophyophore may be of Syringammina fragilissima

Syringammina is a xenophyophore found off the coast of Ireland, near Rockall. It is one of the largest single-celled organisms known, at up to 20 centimetres (8 in) across. It was first described in 1882 by the oceanographer John Murray, after being discovered on an expedition in the ship Triton which dredged the deep ocean bed off the west coast of Scotland in an effort to find organisms new to science. It was the first xenophyophore to be described and at first its relationship with other organisms was a mystery, but it is now considered to be a member of the Foraminifera.

The organism appears as an agglomeration of sediment a few centimetres across, a sandy ball that easily crumbles when removed from the seabed. It consists of a single cell which expands to form hundreds of hollow branched and interconnecting tubes; these secrete an organic cement to which particles of sediment and sand adhere, forming a crusty structure called the test. As the test grows, the cell withdraws from parts of it, which are then colonised by other organisms, such as nematodes. The single cell has no cell divisions but is multinucleate, having multiple nuclei.

It is not known how the organism feeds or reproduces. It may be a filter feeder, drawing water through the tubes and sifting out the nutritious particles. Alternatively, much faecal matter accumulates in the tubes, and it has been suggested that it feeds on the bacteria that colonise the waste. This theory is supported by the fact that it has high concentrations of lipids within its cytosol, which suggests that it may feed on bacteria from the sediment that makes up the tubes. In common with other xenophyophores, the organism has tiny crystals of barium sulphate, known as granellae, scattered throughout the cytosol.

Syringammina fragilissima, the first xenophyophore known to science, was described by Henry Bowman Brady in 1883, from specimens dredged from the Faroe Channel.

S. minuta, described by Pearcey in 1914, was not properly figured and the original specimen is unaccounted for.

The species Syringammina limosa was described in 2018 from the Sea of Okhotsk at a depth of 3300 metres.

== See also ==
- Largest organisms
