= Peter A. Rona =

American oceanographer (1934–2014)

- Born: Peter Arnold Rona; August 17, 1934; Trenton, New Jersey, U.S.
- Died: February 20, 2014 (aged 79); Plainsboro, New Jersey, U.S.
- Education: Brown University; Columbia University; Yale University
- Known for: Paleodictyon nodosum
- Spouse: Donna Rona (m. 1973–2013; her death)
- Children: Jessica
- Scientific career
- Fields: Geology, oceanography
- Workplaces: Rutgers University

Peter Arnold Rona (August 17, 1934 – February 20, 2014) was an American oceanographer. He was also a professor of Earth and planetary sciences at Rutgers University.

== Early years and college ==
Born in Trenton, New Jersey, Rona collected rocks and minerals as a child. This passion would lead him to a bachelor's degree in geology from Brown University in 1956 and a master's in geology from Yale University in 1957. Working for Standard Oil from 1957 to 1959, he explored the Southwestern U.S. for future refinery sites. While visiting his family in December 1958, he met oceanographers, in New York for a meeting, who mentioned a new oceanic ecology. He returned to school, researching oceanographic gear at Columbia University, and received a Ph.D. in marine geology and geophysics from Yale in 1967.

== Oceanography ==
He went on to explore the Atlantic Ocean for the National Oceanic and Atmospheric Administration (NOAA), using dredges, cameras and echo sounders that mapped the seabed. While doing so, he found a hot spring along the Mid-Atlantic Ridge in 1985. Not only did the hot spring yield valuable metals, such as gold and silver, but they also were an ecosystem of lifeforms never seen before. The 2003 film, Volcanoes of the Deep Sea, documents Rona's and his colleague Richard A. Lutz's excursions of the oceanic hot springs.

Rona and Lutz had been scouring the ocean floors for the organism Paleodictyon nodosum, believed to be one of the Earth's earliest complex life forms, or one of the oldest "living fossils". No living creatures have been found, only thousands of their formed hexagonal patterns.

In 1987, the U.S. Department of Commerce awarded Rona its gold medal for exceptional scientific contributions to the nation. He joined Rutgers in 1994 as a professor.

== Death ==
In February 2014, Rona died in Plainsboro Township, New Jersey, from complications related to multiple myeloma. His wife of more than 40 years, Donna, died in 2013. They are survived by one daughter, Jessica.
