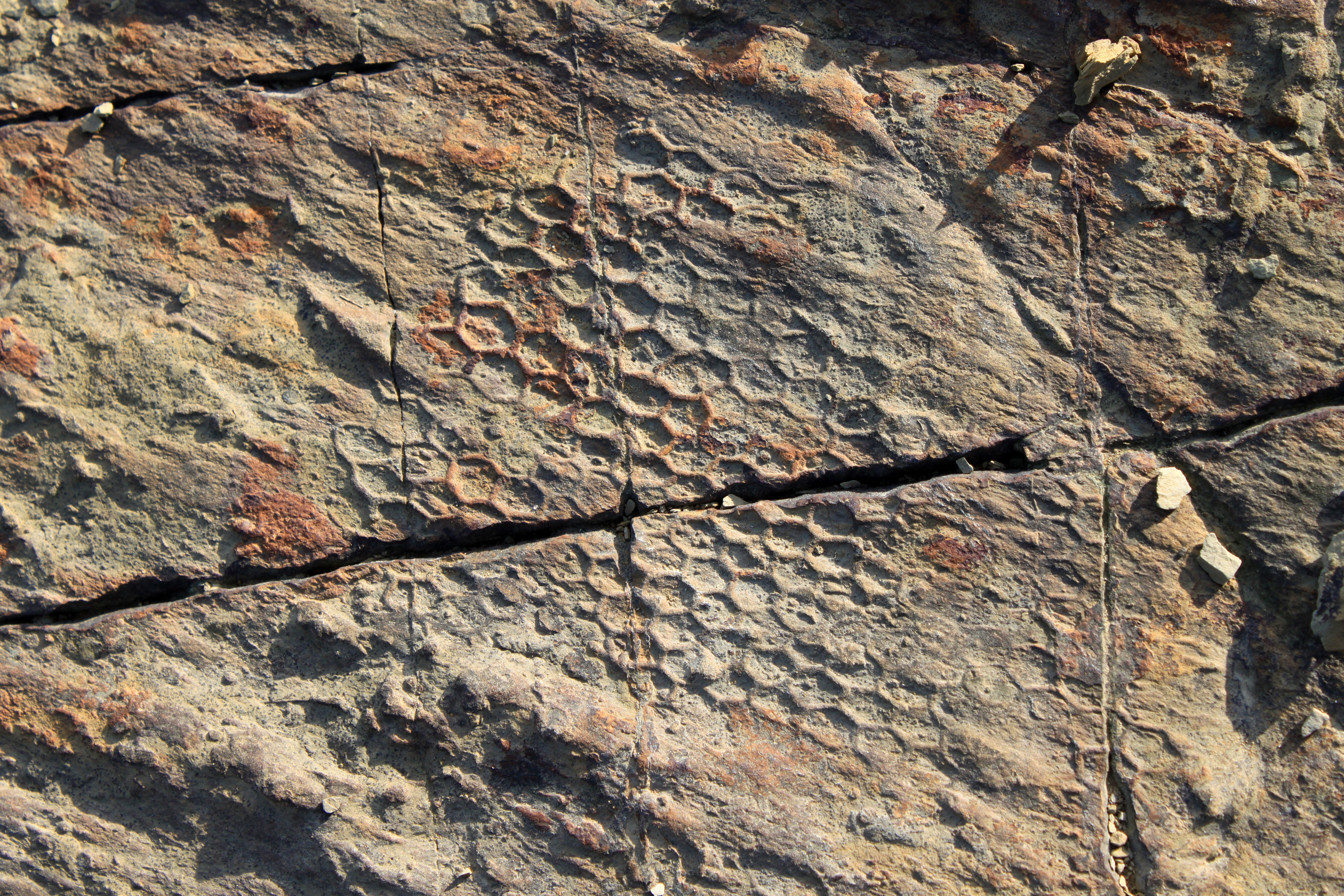
- Paleodictyon imperfectum in Oligocene-Miocene sandrock

Trace fossil classification
- Ichnogenus: Paleodictyon; Meneghini, 1850

= Paleodictyon =

Paleodictyon Temporal range: Cambrian–Recent

Trace fossil

Paleodictyon is a trace fossil, usually interpreted to be a burrow, which appears in the geologic marine record beginning in the Precambrian/Early Cambrian and in modern ocean environments. Paleodictyon were first described by Giuseppe Meneghini in 1850. The origin of the trace fossil is enigmatic and numerous candidates have been proposed.

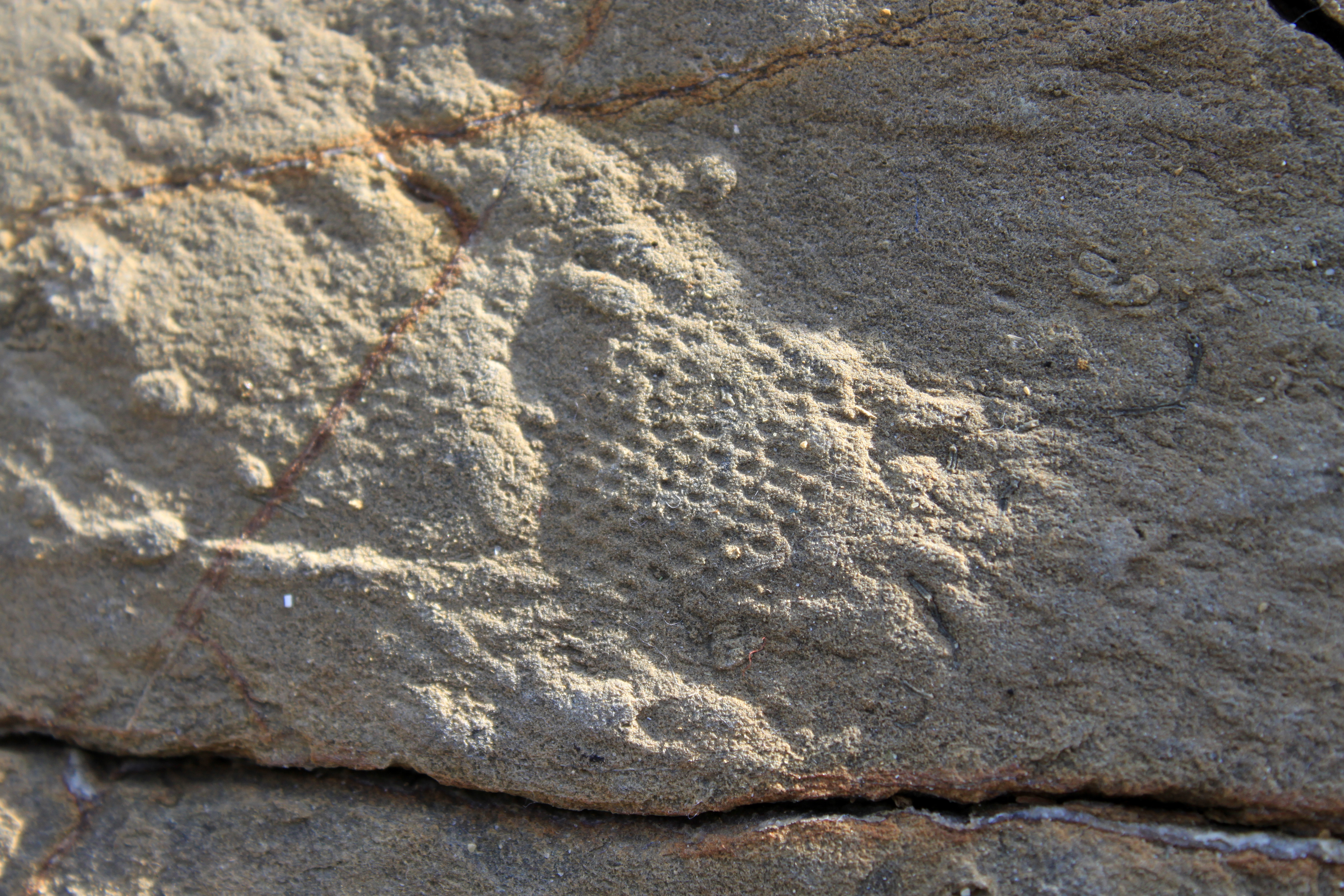
Paleodictyon minimum.

== Description ==
Paleodictyon consist of thin tunnels or ridges that usually form hexagonal or polygonal-shaped honeycomb-like network. Both irregular and regular nets are known throughout the stratigraphic range of Paleodictyon, but it is the striking regular honeycomb pattern of some forms such as P. carpathecum and P. nodosum which make it notable and widely studied.

Individual mesh elements may be millimeters to centimeters, usually from 1-1.5 to 2-3 cm, and entire mesh patterns can cover areas up to a square meter. The edges or threads that make up the mesh are usually cylindrical or ellipsoid in cross-section, and some forms have vertical tubes connecting the mesh upwards to the sediment-water interface. Dolf Seilacher proposed in 1977 that it may be a trap for food, a mechanism for farming, or a foraging path. Alternatively, it has been suggested that it may be a cast of a xenophyophoran protist. Mark McMenamin proposed that Paleodictyon represents a microburrow nest structure. The nest structure empties once the juveniles mature and disperse.

== History of study ==
Much modeling work has been done on Paleodictyon. Roy Plotnick, trace fossil researcher at University of Illinois Chicago, modeled the form as resulting from the iterative modular growth of an unknown organism. Garlick and Miller modeled it as a burrow with a relatively simple burrow algorithm.

== Hypotheses about origin ==
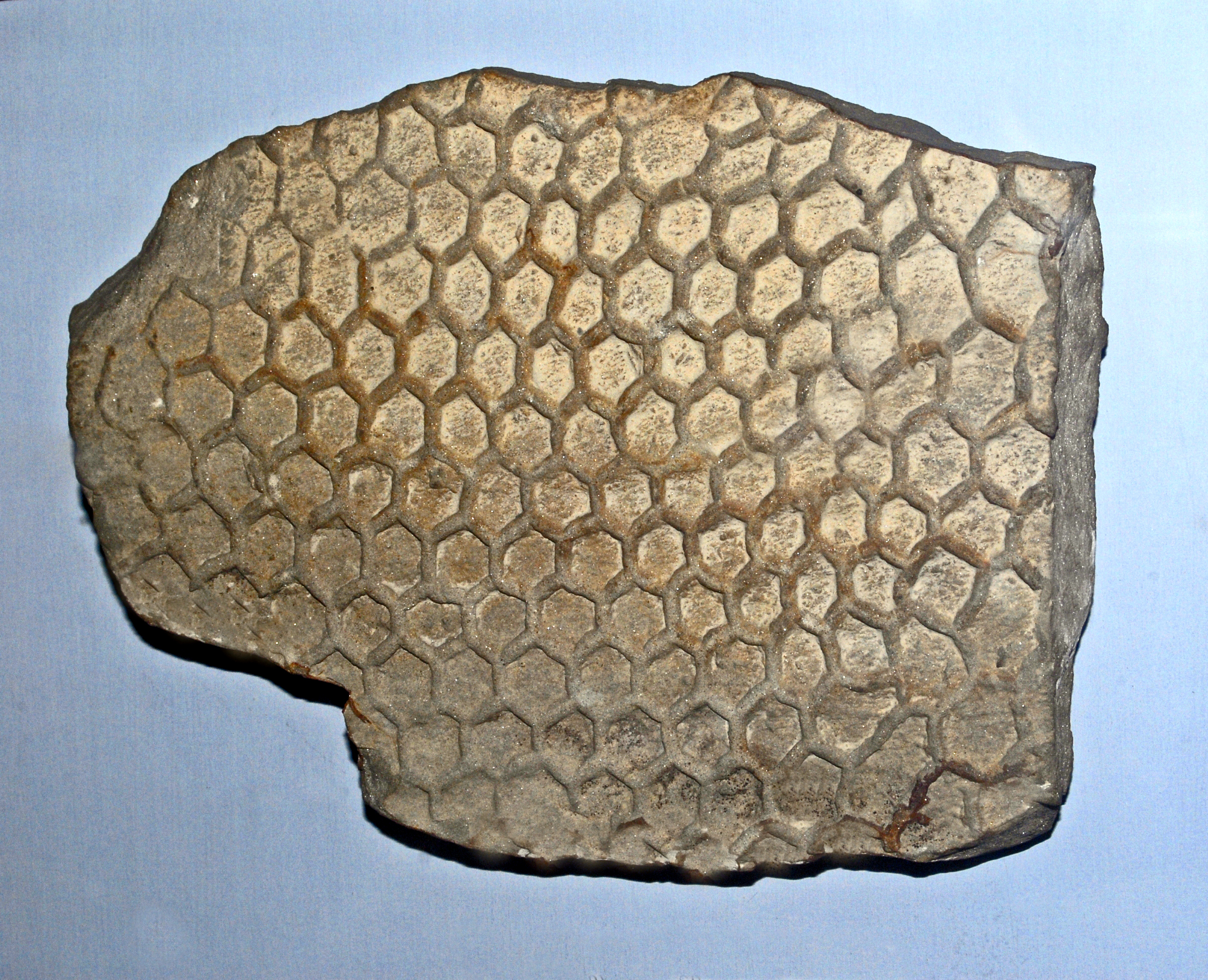
Paleodictyon from Miocene of Fiume Savio

The question is whether these patterns are burrows of marine animals such as worms or fossilized remains of ancient organisms (sponges or algae). Observations on Paleodictyon using Euler graph theory suggest that it is unlikely to be an excavation trace fossil, and that it is more likely to be an imprint or body fossil, or to be of abiotic origin.

=== Xenophyophore identity ===
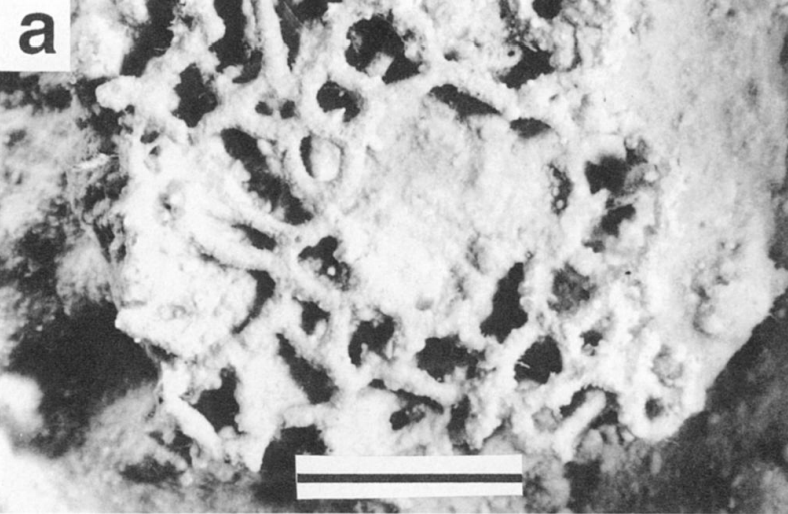
The xenophyophore Occultammina has been suggested as a possible identity for the maker of Paleodictyon, but this remains controversial.

It has been suggested that Paleodictyon may represent a body fossil of a xenophyophore, a type of giant foraminifera. The infaunal xenophyophore Occultammina does bear some physical resemblance to Paleodictyon and the abyssal habitat of modern xenophyophores is indeed similar to the inferred paleoenvironment where fossil graphoglyptids are found; however, the large size (up to 0.5 m) and regularity of many graphoglyptids as well as the apparent absence of collected sediment particles (known as xenophyae) in their fossils casts doubt on the possibility. Further, modern xenophyophores lack the regular hexagonal symmetry common to Paleodictyon. Modern examples of Paleodictyon have been discovered; however, examination failed to reveal stercomares, a hardened test, protoplasm, or xenophyophore DNA. The trace may alternately represent a burrow or a glass sponge.

=== Arthropod identity ===
Baucon et al. (2026) propose that the traces may have been made by peracarid arthropods. They note that the straight tunnels and pointed corners indicate a tracemaker with a rigid skeleton and jointed appendages. The hexagonal nature of the burrows also requires spatial skills and mobility that other proposed tracemakers do not possess.

== Search for a living animal ==
The IMAX film Volcanoes of the Deep Sea describes the search for a living animal that produces the Paleodictyon, using the deep-water submersible DSV Alvin near volcanic vents that lie 3,500 metres (11,500 ft) underwater in the Mid-Atlantic Ridge. They found and took samples from many of the Paleodictyon nodosum honeycomb burrows. However, no creatures were found in any of them. They theorized that the burrows were being used for cultivating/trapping bacteria by whichever creature created them.
