= Paleodictyon nodosum =

Paleodictyon nodosum Temporal range: Eocene–Holocene

Trace fossil classification
- Ichnogenus: Paleodictyon
- Ichnospecies: Paleodictyon nodosum Seilacher, 1977

Extinct burrowing sea creature

Paleodictyon nodosum is a living creature thought to produce a certain form of burrow nearly identical to Paleodictyon fossils. The modern burrows were found around mid-ocean ridge systems in the Pacific and Atlantic Oceans. Although scientists have collected many of the burrows of Paleodictyon nodosum, they have never seen a live one. What a live specimen would look like is widely debated, with the debate being split into two main sides.

- Adolf Seilacher who discovered the original fossils of Paleodictyon nodosum hypothesizes that the creature is a worm-like species that burrows into the sediment around hydrothermal vents and deflects water flow through the burrows to catch food or farm its own food.
- Peter A. Rona, discoverer of the modern burrows, suggests that Paleodictyon nodosum may actually be a large protist. There are other known examples of protists reaching the sizes that Paleodictyon reaches, and they are known to be infaunal.

Scientists ran various tests on the burrows of Paleodictyon and were unable to reach a single conclusion as to the form of Paleodictyon. The one thing that they can agree upon is that there are many markers that suggest that these forms are caused by a creature, and not by geological forces.

== Distribution/discovery ==
Paleodictyon nodosum burrows were originally photographed in 1976 on the Galapagos Rift between 2400–3700m depth. Later, Seilacher and Rona used the deep-water submersible DSV Alvin to recover samples of the same form near the Mid-Atlantic Ridge. These samples were collected between 3430m and 3575m depth, around 26°N and 45°W. These burrows were found in very similar conditions as the ones found along the Galapagos Rift. The biggest similarity between the habitats of all Paleodictyon nodosum is that they are all found along divergent plate boundaries at both active and extinct hydrothermal vents.

== Burrows ==
The burrows of Paleodictyon nodosum are one of the few things about them that scientists are actually able to study, and so this is possibly the area of which we know the most about Paleodictyon nodosum. The top of the form is shaped like a shield, with the center raised, and a lip around the outside. The center is raised approximately 5mm above the low points. Each horizontal section consists of three equidistant rows of tiny holes (approximately 1 mm in diameter) that connect at 120° angles. Each of these horizontal sections are connected by vertical shafts (approximately 2–3 mm in diameter).

When actively being inhabited, the surface of the burrow is made of red metalliferous sediment. When it becomes inactive, this becomes covered with a light gray Lutite and the top flattens out. The red sediment is only found under the surface sediment in this environment, so its presence at the surface hints at a biotic factor which brings up the sediment. The number of rows and the spacing of these rows increases in correlation with the size of the overall form. This indicates that these burrows are a result of organic growth. The raised parts of the burrow force water to flow through the burrow. As a result of this, scientists found large numbers of foraminifera tests within the burrows. These were trapped in certain areas suggesting that the burrows were engineered to catch prey as food. However, the microbial counts did not change from the inside of the burrows to the area surrounding it.

=== Hypothesis 1 – trace fossil ===
The hypothesis supported by Seilacher, that the burrows we find are trace fossils of a worm-like animal, is supported by several features of the burrows, and is also not an unheard of concept in the animal kingdom. The shape of the burrows is consistent with other graphoglyptids. The burrows also had several exits, which is inconsistent with the idea of a "megalith" foraminifera.

A different animal that creates burrows, and cultivates food within those burrows, is the leafcutter ant. This suggests that the idea of an animal cultivating its own food is not unreasonable, and the fact that the deep-ocean seafloor environment is so low in nutrition it seems like a logical evolutionary step to have been taken.

=== Hypothesis 2 – sponge / xenophyophore ===
The second hypothesis, supported by Rona, is that a sponge or megalospheric foraminifera such as a xenophyophore left the structures as a cast of its body. Through testing of collected burrow samples, this hypothesis gained a lot of evidence both for and against it.

One test that was run was watching how water flowed over the burrows. The forced water flow exhibited by these specimen was similar to the forced water flow in several sponges. Another reason that this hypothesis seems likely is that best estimates of the size of the worm suggest that it would have to travel unreasonably long distances (compared to its body length) to fully navigate its burrows (10^{3}~10^{4}).

However, there are several problems with this hypothesis as well: If this was the remains of the body of a creature, one would expect to find organic matter from that creature throughout the burrow. However, when the burrows were tested for DNA, scientists found DNA from different types of large protists between different burrows. This suggests that the DNA found is just there because it was transported there by currents. However, one encouraging fact is that one of the types of DNA found in a burrow was of Vanhoeffenella, which creates hexagonal burrows similar to those of P. nodosum.

The barium content in the sediment making up the burrows had no significant difference from the barium content in the surrounding sediment. This is inconsistent with the burrows of other xenophyophores. Also the complexity and evenness of the burrows is not consistent with the forms that xenophyophores generally create.

== Fossil record ==
The fossil record indicates that these burrow-types could be one of the earliest examples of complex structures being built by animals.

Fossils of Paleodictyon nodosum were first found in the cliffs of Spain in the 1950s. Since then, they have been discovered all over Europe and in Wales. They are generally found in flysch deposits from the Eocene epoch. The oldest fossils show much less uniformly hexagonal burrows, but in higher strata (i.e. later in geological time) their burrows become much more consistent and precise.

== Popular exposure ==
The IMAX film Volcanoes of the Deep Sea describes the search for Paleodictyon nodosum, using the deep-water submersible DSV Alvin near volcanic vents that lie 3,500 meters (12,000 feet) underwater in the Mid-Atlantic Ridge. Samples were taken from several honeycomb burrows, however no creatures were found in any of them. They theorized that the burrows were being used for bacterial farming by whichever creature created them.
