= Volcanoes of the Deep Sea =

- Theatrical release poster
- Directed by: Stephen Low
- Written by: Alex Low; Stephen Low
- Produced by: James Cameron; Pietro L. Serapiglia; Stephen Low; Emory Kristof
- Narrated by: Ed Harris
- Cinematography: William Reeve
- Edited by: James Lahti
- Music by: Michel Cusson
- Production company: The Stephen Low Company
- Release date: September 14, 2003
- Running time: 40 minutes
- Country: Canada
- Language: English
- Budget: 9 million USD

Volcanoes of the Deep Sea is a 2003 documentary film in the IMAX format about undersea volcanoes directed by Stephen Low.

== Production ==
Richard Lutz served as Principal Investigator and Lutz and Peter A. Rona served as Science Directors of the film, which was funded by the National Science Foundation and co-produced by Rutgers University.

== Content ==
The film included footage, research, and stories from the deep-sea Alvin expeditions of Lutz and his colleagues.

Scientists use the deep-water submersible DSV Alvin to search for an organism, the Paleodictyon nodosum maker, that produces a honeycomb patterned fossil called a Paleodictyon, near volcanic vents that lie 3500 meters (12,000 feet) underwater in the Mid-Atlantic Ridge.

== Reception ==
The film received the award for "best IMAX film of the Year" at the Paris Film Festival, and in 2005 Richard Lutz received the Scientific Literacy Achievement Award from the New Jersey Association for Biomedical Research for his contributions to the film.

The film was not shown in some US theatres because it was feared that the film's mention of evolution would provoke a negative reaction from creationist patrons. In particular, the film discussed the similarities in bacterial and human DNA. The film's distributor reported that the only U.S. states with theaters which chose not to show the film were Texas, Georgia, North Carolina, and South Carolina:

"We've got to pick a film that's going to sell in our area. If it's not going to sell, we're not going to take it," said the director of an IMAX theater in Charleston that is not showing the movie. "Many people here believe in creationism, not evolution."

== See also ==
- 9° North
