= Ian Cuttler =

- Born: Ian Cuttler Sala; January 15, 1971; Mexico City, Mexico
- Died: February 25, 2014 (aged 43); Los Angeles, California
- Known for: Photography, art direction
- Awards: Grammy, Alex
- Website: http://www.iancuttler.com

Ian Cuttler Sala (1971–2014) was a Mexican art director, photographer and graphic design artist.

== Biography ==
Ian Cuttler was born in Mexico City, Mexico, in 1971. He lived with his brother Alex and two parents. His mother was crowned Miss Chile in 1968. He studied Bachelor of Fine Arts at the Art Center College of Design in Pasadena, California, (1991–1996). From 1991 to 1993 he co-owned Alebrije Estudio. In 1996, he moved to New York, New York City where he worked for Sony Music from September 1996 to January 2006. As an Art Director he created visual art campaigns for artists like Beyoncé, Ricky Martin, Billy Joel, Mariah Carey, Julio Iglesias, Marc Anthony and Destiny's Child.

In 2000, he was nominated to the Grammy Award for the Best Boxed Recording Package for Louis Armstrong: "The Complete Hot Five And Hot Seven Recordings". He was awarded the Grammy for the Best Boxed Or Special Limited Edition Package for Johnny Cash's "The Legend" box set in the 48th Annual Grammy Awards. In January 2006, he left Sony Music to establish his own studio: Ian Cuttler Photography where he worked with prominent firms.

He died in a car accident in Los Angeles, California, on February 23, 2014.

== Credits ==
Ian Cuttler had credits on the following records:

Year	Record	Artist	Credit
1997	Greatest Hits, Vol. 3	Billy Joel	Art Direction
1998	An Evening at Rao's: Songs from an Italian Restaurant	Various	Art Direction
1998	Handel: Music for the Royal Fireworks	Jeanne Lamon	Art Direction
1998	Latin Mix USA (1998)	Various	Art Direction
1998	Liszt: Soirées de Vienne	Gabriela Imreh	Photography
1998	My Life: The Greatest Hits	Julio Iglesias	Art Direction, Design
1998	The Player: Retrospective	David Bromberg	Artwork, Illustrations
1999	Rainbow	Mariah Carey	Design
1999	The Lost Trident Sessions	Mahavishnu Orchestra	Design
2000	Major League Baseball Presents: M.L.B. Caliente	Various	Art Direction
2000	Noche de Cuatro Lunas	Julio Iglesias	Art Direction
2000	Nothing But Your Love	Toshi Kubota	Art Direction
2000	Purest of Pain	Son by 4	Art Conception, Design
2000	Sound Loaded	Ricky Martin	Art Direction, Design
2000	The Complete Hot Five and Hot Seven Recordings	Louis Armstrong	Art Direction, Design
2000	The Greatest Hits Collection, Vols. 1, 2 & 3	Billy Joel	Art Direction, Mastering
2001	8 Days of Christmas	Destiny's Child	Art Direction
2001	Berlin Lieder: Songs of Irving Berlin	Irving Berlin	Graphic Design
2001	Best of Ricky Martin	Ricky Martin	Art Direction, Design
2001	La Historia	Ricky Martin	Art Direction, Design
2002	A Girl Can Mack	3LW	Art Direction, Design
2002	Heart to Yours	Michelle Williams	Art Direction, Design
2002	Simply Deep	Kelly Rowland	Art Direction
2003	Almas del Silencio	Ricky Martin	Art Direction
2003	Dangerously in Love	Beyoncé	Art Direction
2003	Sings the Rosemary Clooney Songbook	Bette Midler	Design
2003	Stormy Weather: The Music of Harold Arlen	Various	Art Direction, Design
2003	The Other Side of Time	Mary Fahl	Art Direction
2004	A Corazon Abierto	Alejandro Fernández	Art Direction, Design
2004	Amar Sin Mentiras	Marc Anthony	Art Direction
2004	Destiny Fulfilled	Destiny's Child	Art Direction, Design
2004	Do You Know	Michelle Williams	Art Direction
2004	Grammy Nominees 2004	Various	Art Direction
2004	Live & Off the Record	Shakira	Art Direction
2004	Valio la Pena	Marc Anthony	Art Direction
2005	Beethoven, Mendelssohn: Violin Concertos	Nikolai Znaider	Design
2005	Grandes Exitos	Shakira	Package Design
2005	Hitstory	Elvis Presley	Art Direction, Design
2005	Love Songs: Canciones de Amor	Julio Iglesias	Art Direction
2005	The Legend	Johnny Cash	Art Direction, Design
2005	Unwritten	Natasha Bedingfield	Art Direction, Design
2007	Gabriela Imreh Plays Piano Transcriptions	Gabriela Imreh	Photography
2008	Dangerously in Love/Live at Wembley (CD/DVD)	Beyoncé	Art Direction
2008	Walk This Way	The White Tie Affair	Photography
2009	Cabaret (Original Broadway Cast Recording)	Harold Hastings	Design
2009	Gabriela Imreh Plays Bach	Gabriela Imreh	Photography
2009	Vittorio Giannini: Piano Concerto; Symphony No. 4	Daniel Spalding	Photography
2011	Planet Pit	Pitbull	Photography
2014	Rumi Symphony Project: Untold	Hafez Nazeri	Photography

== Awards and nominations ==
- 2000 Grammy (Nomination) – Best Boxed Recording Package for Louis Armstrong: The Complete Hot Five And Hot Seven Recordings.
- 2003 Alex Award (Winner) – Art Direction and design for Beyoncé: Dangerously in Love.
- 2006 Grammy (winner) – Best Boxed Or Special Limited Edition Package for Johnny Cash's The Legend box set.
