= From the Dark Side of the Moon =

Studio album by Mary Fahl
- Released: May 10, 2011
- Recorded: (2006)
- Genre: Alternative rock
- Length: 42:08
- Label: Mary Fahl
- Producer: Mark Doyle; David Werner

Mary Fahl chronology
The Other Side of Time (2003)	From the Dark Side of the Moon (2011)

From the Dark Side of the Moon is a 2011 album released by singer/songwriter Mary Fahl. The album is a song-by-song "re-imagining" of Pink Floyd's classic 1973 album The Dark Side of the Moon.

== Production ==
As of September 2006 Fahl completed the recording of Mary Fahl: From the Dark Side of the Moon, produced by Mark Doyle and David Werner and mixed by Bob Clearmountain. Doyle also provided nearly all of the instrumentation. The album remained unreleased for several years, during which time the masters were lost in a fire. According to Doyle, "The only choice was to travel to NYC in January and do the whole thing over again. It was well worth doing, as we were able to take advantage of the improvements in technology from even 15 years ago. Fahl released the album independently on May 10, 2011.

== Reception ==
Publication Nippertown referred to the album as "mindblowing," while The Morton Report called it "brilliant" and "a worthy re-interpretation not to be missed."

== Track listing ==
#	Song	Length	Original writing credits
01	"Speak to Me"	1:13	Nick Mason
02	"Breathe"	3:01	Roger Waters, David Gilmour, Richard Wright
03	"On the Run"	3:23	Gilmour, Waters
04	"Time"	6:52	Mason, Waters, Wright, Gilmour
05	"The Great Gig in the Sky"	4:58	Wright, Clare Torry
06	"Money"	6:12	Waters
07	"Us and Them"	7:13	Waters, Wright
08	"Any Colour You Like"	3:35	Gilmour, Mason, Wright
09	"Brain Damage"	3:54	Waters
10	"Eclipse"	2:00	Waters

== Personnel ==
- Mary Fahl - vocals, arrangements
- Mark Doyle - producer, instrumentation
- David Werner - producer
- Bob Clearmountain - mixing

== See also ==
- The Dark Side of the Moon
