= Granellae =

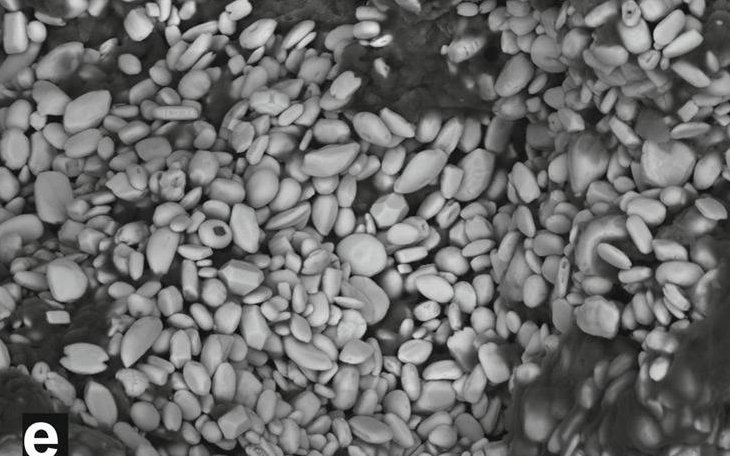
Barium sulfate crystals in Xenophyophores, scale bar 10 microns, electron microscope image

Granellae are barium sulfate crystals within the cytoplasm of xenophyophores, giant single-celled megafauna found in the eastern Pacific seafloor. Their formation and functionality are not well understood, but the crystals are generally accepted to be absorbed from the environment. Densely packed, they may provide the rigidity to the organism, and also be a waste product of other cell organs. A single organism may contain granellae ranging from 1-10 microns in size.
