= Stercomata =

Stercomata (or stercomes) are extracellular pellets of waste material produced by some groups of foraminiferans, including xenophyophoreans and komokiaceans, Gromia, and testate amoebae. The pellets are ovoid (egg-shaped), brownish in color, and on average measure from 10-20 μm in length. Stercomata are composed of small mineral grains and undigested waste products held together by strands of glycosaminoglycans.

The term “sterkome” was first used Schaudinn in 1899 to describe the balls of undigested food remains produced by the testate amoeba Trichosphaerium sieboldi, the foraminiferan Saccammina sphaerica, and the gromiid Gromia dujardinii. Schaudinn conducted feeding experiments on live individuals of Trichosphaerium sieboldi kept in culture dishes to confirm that stercomata were accumulations of waste material produced as a byproduct of feeding.

== Taxonomic distribution ==
=== Foraminifera ===
Stercomata are produced by members of several different subclades of Foraminifera that possess organic-walled or agglutinated tests, including: single-chambered taxa with spherical organic-walled tests (e.g., Bathyallogromia and other undescribed species), single-chambered taxa with sac-like agglutinated tests (e.g., Saccammina and Leptammina), single-chambered taxa with tubular agglutinated tests (e.g., Bathysiphon), multi-chambered taxa with organic-walled tests (e.g., Nodellum and Resigella), taxa with complex agglutinated tests composed of delicate branching tubes (Komokioidea), and deep-sea taxa with large, complex tests agglutinated tests (Xenophyophorea).

==== Saccamminid foraminiferans ====
Unlike multi-chambered foraminiferans like Textulariids or Rotaliids, Saccamminids typically have just one test chamber, which is a key morphological feature. Saccamminid tests are often globular, ovoid, or flask-shaped, though some can take more complex, branching shapes. These generally simple shapes are helpful in the bathyal and abyssal sediments in which Saccamminids are abundant and genetically diverse. At abyssal depths, organic carbon flux is tiny, so every gram of biomass is essential. A single-chambered test costs less energy to build and maintain and requires less biomineralization or sediment manipulation to agglutinate than a multi-chambered test does. Saccamminids are therefore uniquely prevalent in low-food, low-oxygen environments where other calcareous foraminifera can be rare.

==== Xenophyophores ====
In xenophyophores, the stercomata are contained within an organic tubes called stercomare.

=== Gromiida ===
Gromiida is a subclade of Endomyxa, a clade that branches within the more inclusive group Rhizaria, a clade that encompasses a diverse array free-living and parasitic single-celled eukaryotes that possess branching or anastomosing pseudopodia and complex life cycles.

In Gromia, the only described genus of Gromiida, stercomata are spherical to ovoid in shape and range in color from brown to gray to orange. Individual stercomes range in size from <5 μm (G. psammophila) to 15-30 μm (G. saoirsei). Stercomata consist of the undigested remains of ingested food and may include mineral grains, sponge spicules and diatoms, which are held together by glycosaminoglycans. Unlike the stercomata in foraminiferans, the stercomata in gromiids are retained in the cytoplasm and not stored outside of the cell body; however, after the release of flagellated gametes during sexual reproduction, the stercomata remain in the interior of the test.

== See also ==
- Feces
- Fecalith
