= Richard A. Lutz =

American marine biologist (born 1949)

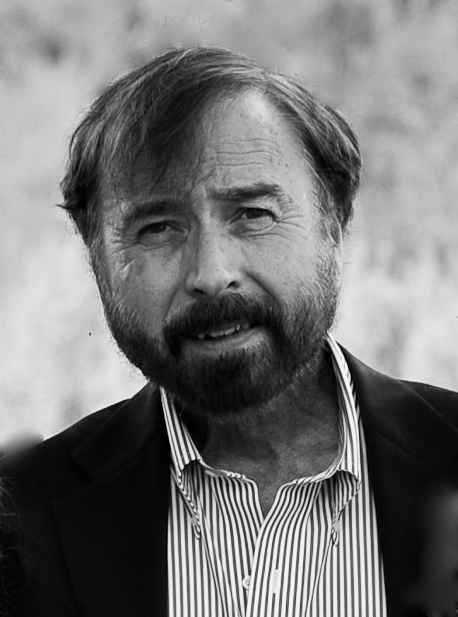
- Lutz in 2011
- Born: June 8, 1949 (age 77); New York City, US
- Education: University of Virginia (1967-1971); University of Maine (1971-1975); Yale University (1977-1979)
- Awards: Thurlow C. Nelson Award (National Shellfisheries Association); Scientific Literacy Achievement Award (2005 NJ Assoc. for Biomedical Research)
- Scientific career
- Fields: Marine biology
- Workplaces: Rutgers University (1979-present)

Richard Arthur Lutz (born June 8, 1949) is an American marine biologist and deep-sea oceanographer. He is known for deep-sea research using the Alvin submersible, and is considered one of the world's foremost authorities on the ecology of deep-sea hydrothermal vents.

Lutz is a professor at the Rutgers Department of Marine and Coastal Sciences. In 2003, he was Principal Investigator and Science Director of the IMAX film Volcanoes of the Deep Sea, which included footage and research from his numerous expeditions to study an active deep-sea caldera on the East Pacific Rise, at depths of 2500 meters. His research has been included in publications such as National Geographic Magazine, Science, Nature, and American Scientist.

== Education ==
Lutz was born on June 8, 1949, in New York City. He received his B.A. in biology from the University of Virginia in 1971, and that year began attending the University of Maine. While there he was a research assistant at the school's Department of Oceanography, and earned his Ph.D. in oceanography in 1975. He continued in the University of Maine's Oceanography department as a postdoctoral research associate until 1977.

Lutz then worked two years as a postdoctoral fellow in the Department of Geology and Geophysics at Yale University.

== Rutgers University ==
As professor

Lutz joined the faculty at Rutgers University in 1979 as an assistant professor. He received his tenure in July 1984, as an associate professor until 1987. He worked in the graduate faculties for Ecology and Evolution, Geology, Cell and Developmental Biology, and Oceanography. He was given the Rutgers' Board of Trustees Award for Excellence in Research in 1988. Since 1989, he has been a professor in their Department of Marine and Coastal Sciences.

School positions

From 1985 to 1994, he also was the director of the school's Haskin Research Laboratory, and from 1985 to 1990 as chair of the school's Department of Oyster Culture. From 1986 to 1997, he was the director of the university's Fisheries and Aquaculture Technology Extension Center. In 1995, he became director of Rutger's Center for Deep-Sea Ecology and Biotechnology.

=== Institute of Marine and Coastal Sciences ===
In 1985, Lutz began as a chairman of the Planning and Search Committee for the then-envisioned Institute of Marine and Coastal Sciences (IMCS) at Rutgers. He has been the Associate Director of the IMCS since 1989. Lutz currently directs the Institutes research programs, and oversees the various field stations including the Haskin Shellfish Research Laboratory in Cumberland County and the Multi-Species Aquaculture Development Facility in Cape May County. He also continues as a professor.

In February 2011, Lutz was named director of IMCS, succeeding Francisco E. Werner. Two months later, IMCS was named the fourth top oceanographic institution in the world, based on a Reuters survey of paper citations since 2000 and impact on the marine sciences. At the time, Lutz quoted "This is huge. We've gone from not being on the map 25 years ago, to 10th in the nation in 10 years according to the National Science Foundation … and now we're fourth in the world".

== Deep sea research ==
Lutz participated in one of the first biological expeditions to study the ecology of deep-sea hydrothermal vents in 1979. Since that year, Lutz has continuously spent time in various deep-diving submersibles studying thermal vents throughout the world's oceans.

In 1990, Lutz and Rutgers geneticist Bob Vrijenhoek embarked on a yearlong survey they dubbed a "Magical Mystery Tour" of most of the known hydrothermal vents and cold seeps in the eastern Pacific and the Gulf of Mexico. They undertook a series of dives in deep-sea submersibles, chiefly in the Alvin. On August 12, 1991, Lutz, diver Randy Hinderer, and biologist Van Dover became trapped in the Alvin 100 miles off the coast of Oregon while searching for a deep-sea clam bed. The submersible was successfully recovered and all survived.

=== April 1991 eruption ===
In April 1991, Lutz joined a number of geological colleagues on an oceanographic expedition to explore an undersea eruption along the East Pacific Rise. They used the deep-submergence vehicle Alvin to dive to the depth of a mile and a half, or 2500 meters into the caldera of the actively erupting volcanic ridge, the first time such an expedition had been attempted.

Lutz has since returned to the caldera at what are approximately annual expeditions to document the significant biological and geological changes at the site. He has also w as chief scientist on numerous oceanographic cruises.

=== Volcanoes of the Deep Sea ===
Lutz was Principal Investigator and Science Director of the 2005 IMAX film Volcanoes of the Deep Sea, which was funded by the National Science Foundation and co-produced by Rutgers University. The film included footage, research, and stories from the deep-sea Alvin expeditions of Lutz and his colleagues. The film received the award for "best IMAX film of the Year" at the Paris Film Festival, and in 2005 Lutz received the Scientific Literacy Achievement Award from the New Jersey Association for Biomedical Research for his contributions to the film.

== Publishing ==
Lutz has over 175 publications to his name. Lutz's studies on the deep-sea caldera have been featured in many scientific journals and magazines including three issues of National Geographic Magazine, Science, Nature, a cover story in American Scientist, and Discover Magazine.

He was associate editor of the Journal of Shellfish Research from 1981 to 1986, and on the editorial board for Critical Reviews in Marine Science from 1986 to 2000. He was also on the editorial board for Estuaries from 1987 to 1992, and the editorial board of reviewers for the American Malacological Bulletin from 1984 to 2000.

== Memberships ==
- World Mariculture Society
- Society for Integrative and Comparative Biology
- American Association for the Advancement of Science
- Estuarine Research Federation
- New England Estuarine Research Federation
- American Geophysical Union
- American Malacological Union
- National Shellfisheries Association (president 1983–1984)

== Personal life ==
Lutz is married to American singer/songwriter Mary Fahl.
