= The Guys =

Play by Anne Nelson

- Original language: English
- Written by: Anne Nelson

Premiere
- Date: December 4, 2001
- Place: The Flea Theater; New York City

The Guys is a play by Anne Nelson about the aftereffects of the collapse of the World Trade Center. A film version of the play was released in 2002 and starred Sigourney Weaver and Anthony LaPaglia.

== History ==
In the play, Joan, an editor, helps Nick, a New York Fire Department captain, prepare the eulogies for the eight firefighters who died under his command that day, out of a crew of twelve. The play debuted off-Broadway at The Flea Theater on December 4, 2001, directed by Jim Simpson and starring Sigourney Weaver and Bill Murray.

Since 2001, The Guys has been presented in 48 US states and in the Czech Republic, Argentina, Japan, Italy and Poland. Tim Robbins and Susan Sarandon presented it at the Edinburgh Festival. It enjoyed a commemorative rerun at the Flea Theater in 2006 on the 5th anniversary of 9/11. In parts of the theatrical run the two roles were played by Anthony LaPaglia and Sigourney Weaver. They also star in a 2002 film adaptation, for which Weaver was nominated for a Golden Satellite Award for best performance by an actress. The play was published by Dramatists Play Service and Random House in 2002. The audible.com recorded version, which featured Bill Irwin and Swoosie Kurtz, won an Audie Award for best recorded play of the year.

Weaver and LaPaglia reprised their roles in the film version, which was also directed by Jim Simpson. The film debuted at the Toronto International Film Festival on September 11, 2002 and was released in theaters in April 2003. It was shot in New York on a $500,000 budget.
