= Una furtiva lagrima =

Tenor aria from the opera L'elisir d'amore

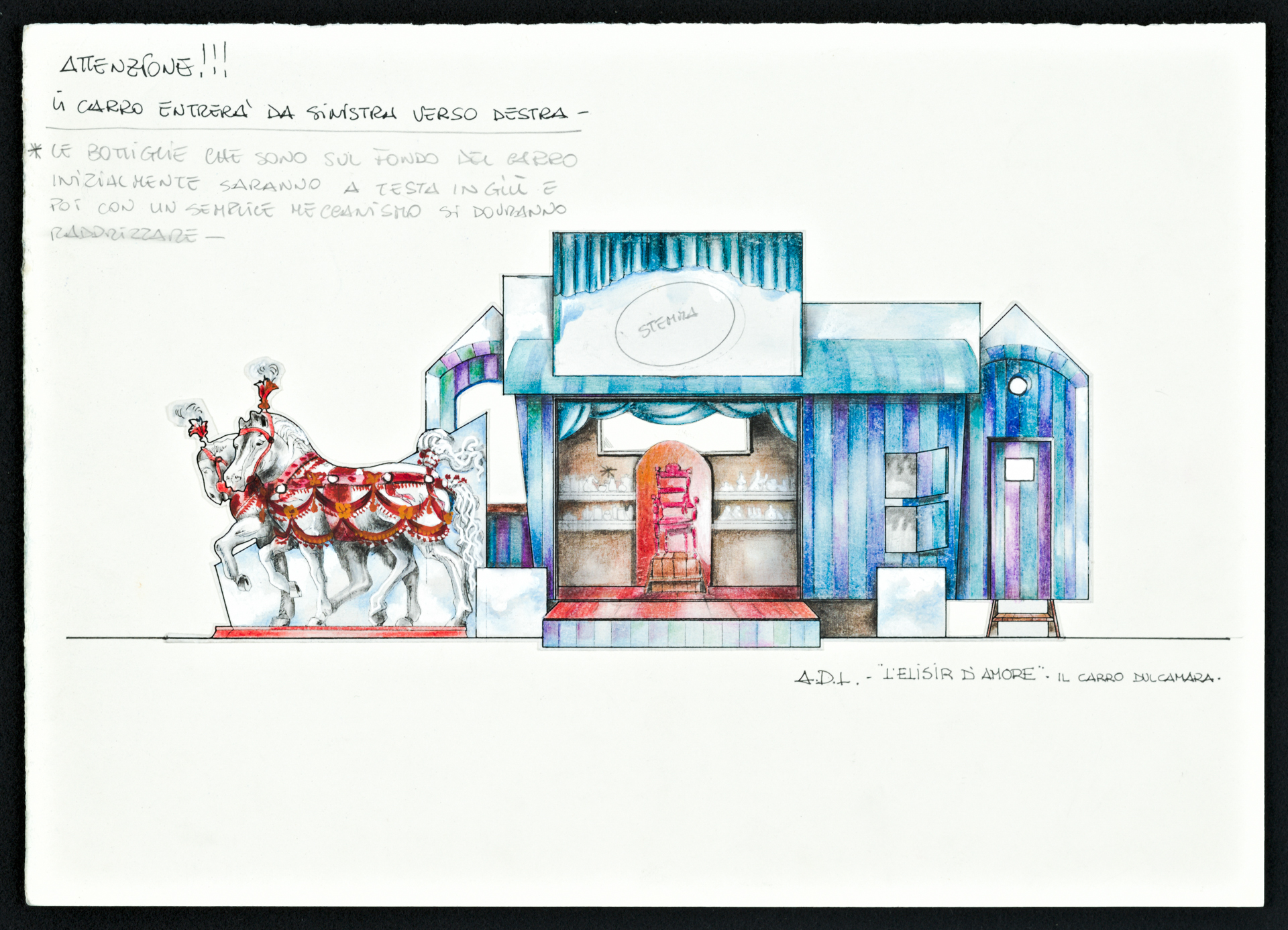
Set designer's depiction of the cart from which Dr. Dulcemara ("sweet-bitter") sells the elixir of love (Aldo De Lorenzo, 1988)

"Una furtiva lagrima" (A furtive tear) is the romanza from act 2, scene 8 of the Italian opera L'elisir d'amore by Gaetano Donizetti. It is sung by Nemorino (tenor) when it appears that the love potion he bought to win the heart of his dream lady, Adina, is working. He loves Adina, but she is not interested in an innocent, rustic man such as he. To win her heart, he buys a love potion with all the money he has in his pocket. It is actually a cheap red wine sold by a traveling quack doctor—but when he sees Adina weeping, he assumes the "elixir" has worked and she has fallen in love with him. Nemorino is often comically drunk (because red wine), but "his growing maturity" is exposed in the heartfelt "La furtiva lagrima," about tears he saw in "strong-willed" Adina's eyes, which give him hope she could love him back.

"Una furtiva lagrima"
Enrico Caruso in 1911 for the Victor Talking Machine Company

== Music ==
In an opera about fake potions and feigned emotions, Donizetti invests this aria with considerable pathos. It is set in B♭ minor, a dark key with often tragic associations.

The aria's time signature is the compound metre of 6/8. It changes to B♭ major on the words "Cielo! Si può morir!". Its vocal range is from F_{3} to A♭_{4} with a tessitura of B♭_{3} to A♭_{4}. The last occurrence of the word chiedo is a coloratura melisma of 24 notes covering F_{3} to G_{4}.

== Libretto ==
The Italian text is taken from a score and libretto at Indiana University. They do not include the last line, "Si può morir! Si può morir d'amor", which is heard in most of the romanza's performances.

Una furtiva lagrima
negli occhi suoi spuntò:
Quelle festose giovani
invidiar sembrò.

Che più cercando io vo?
Che più cercando io vo?
M'ama! Sì, m'ama,
lo vedo, lo vedo.

Un solo istante i palpiti
del suo bel cor sentir!
I miei sospir confondere
per poco a' suoi sospir!
I palpiti, i palpiti sentir,
confondere i miei co' suoi sospir.

Cielo, si può morir;
di più non chiedo, non chiedo.
Ah, cielo! Si può! Si può morir!
Di più non chiedo, non chiedo.
(Si può morir! Si può morir d'amor.)

Literal translation
A furtive tear
in her eyes appeared:
Those festive young girls
she seemed to envy.

What more need I look for?
What more need I look for?
She loves me! Yes, she loves me,
I see it, I see it.

For a single instant the beats
of her beautiful heart to hear!
My sighs to blend
for a while with her sighs!
Her heartbeats, her heartbeats to hear,
my sighs with hers to merge.

Heavens! One could die!
More I cannot ask, I cannot ask.
Oh, heavens! One could, one could die!
More I cannot ask, I cannot ask.
(One could die! One could die of love!)

Poetic translation
Softly a furtive teardrop fell,
shadowed her sparkling eyes;
Seeing the others follow me
has caused her jealous sighs.

What is there more to prize?
What more than this could I prize?
Sighing, she loves me,
I saw that she loves me.

Could I but feel her heart on mine,
breathing that tender sigh!
Could my own sighing comfort her,
and whisper in sweet reply!
Her heart on mine, as heart to heart we sigh.
So tenderly we'd share a sweet reply!

Heaven, I then could die;
no more I'd ask you, I'd ask you,
ah! heaven, I, then, I then could die;
no more I'd ask you, I'd ask you.
(I then could die, I then could die of love.)
