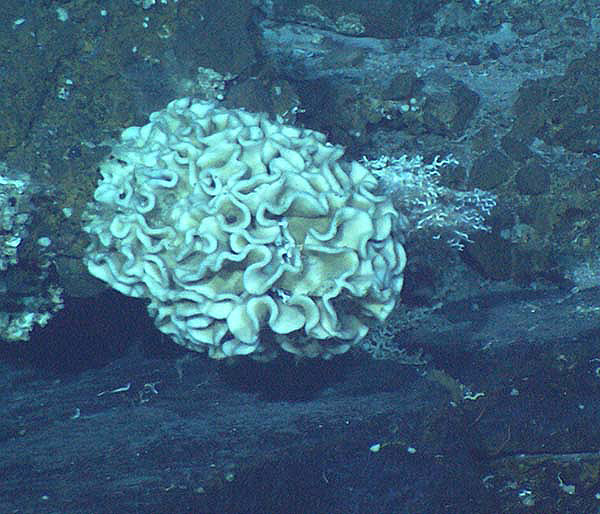
- Image of a deep sea xenophyophore
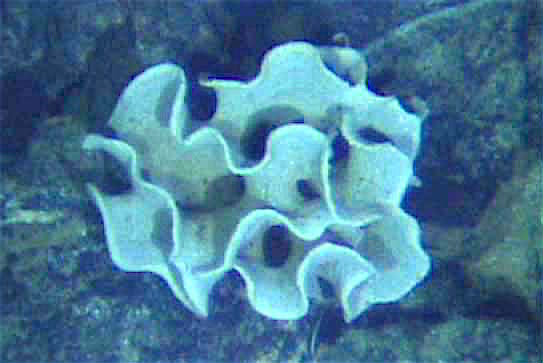
- Xenophyophore at the Galapagos Rift

Scientific classification
- Domain: Eukaryota
- Supergroup: Rhizaria
- Phylum: Foraminifera
- Class: Monothalamea
- Clade: Xenophyophorea; Schulze, 1904

Orders and subtaxa incertae sedis
- Psamminida Poche, 1913; Stannomida Tendal, 1972; Clade incertae sedis; Ammoclathrinidae Tendal, 1972

= Xenophyophorea =

Clade of single-celled organisms

Xenophyophorea /ˌzɛnəˌfaɪəˈfoʊriːə/ is a clade of foraminiferans. Xenophyophores are multinucleate unicellular organisms found on the ocean floor throughout the world's oceans, at depths of 500 to 10,600 metres (1,600 to 34,800 ft). They are a kind of foraminiferan that extract minerals from their surroundings and use them to form an exoskeleton known as a test.

They were first described by Henry Bowman Brady in 1883. They are abundant on abyssal plains, and in some regions are the dominant species. Fifteen genera and 75 species have been described, varying widely in size. The largest, Syringammina fragilissima, is among the largest known coenocytes, reaching up to 20 centimetres (8 in) in diameter.

== Naming and classification ==
The name Xenophyophora means "bearer of foreign bodies", from the Greek. This refers to the sediments, called xenophyae, which are cemented together to construct their tests. In 1883, Henry Bowman Brady classified them as primitive Foraminifera. Later they were placed within the sponges. In the beginning of the 20th century they were considered an independent class of Rhizopoda, and later as a new eukaryotic phylum of Protista. Phylogenetic studies suggest that xenophyophores are a specialized group of monothalamous (single-chambered) Foraminifera.

A 2013 molecular study using small subunit rDNA found Syringammina and Shinkaiya to form a monophyletic clade closely related to Rhizammina algaeformis. Further molecular evidence has confirmed the monophyly of xenophyophores. This study also suggested that many individual genera are polyphyletic, with similar body shapes convergently evolving multiple times.

Historically xenophyophores have been divided into the agglutinated Psamminida and the flexible, proteinaceous Stannomida. However, cladistic analyses based on molecular data have suggested a high amount of homoplasy, and that the division between psamminids and stannomids is not well supported.

== Anatomy ==
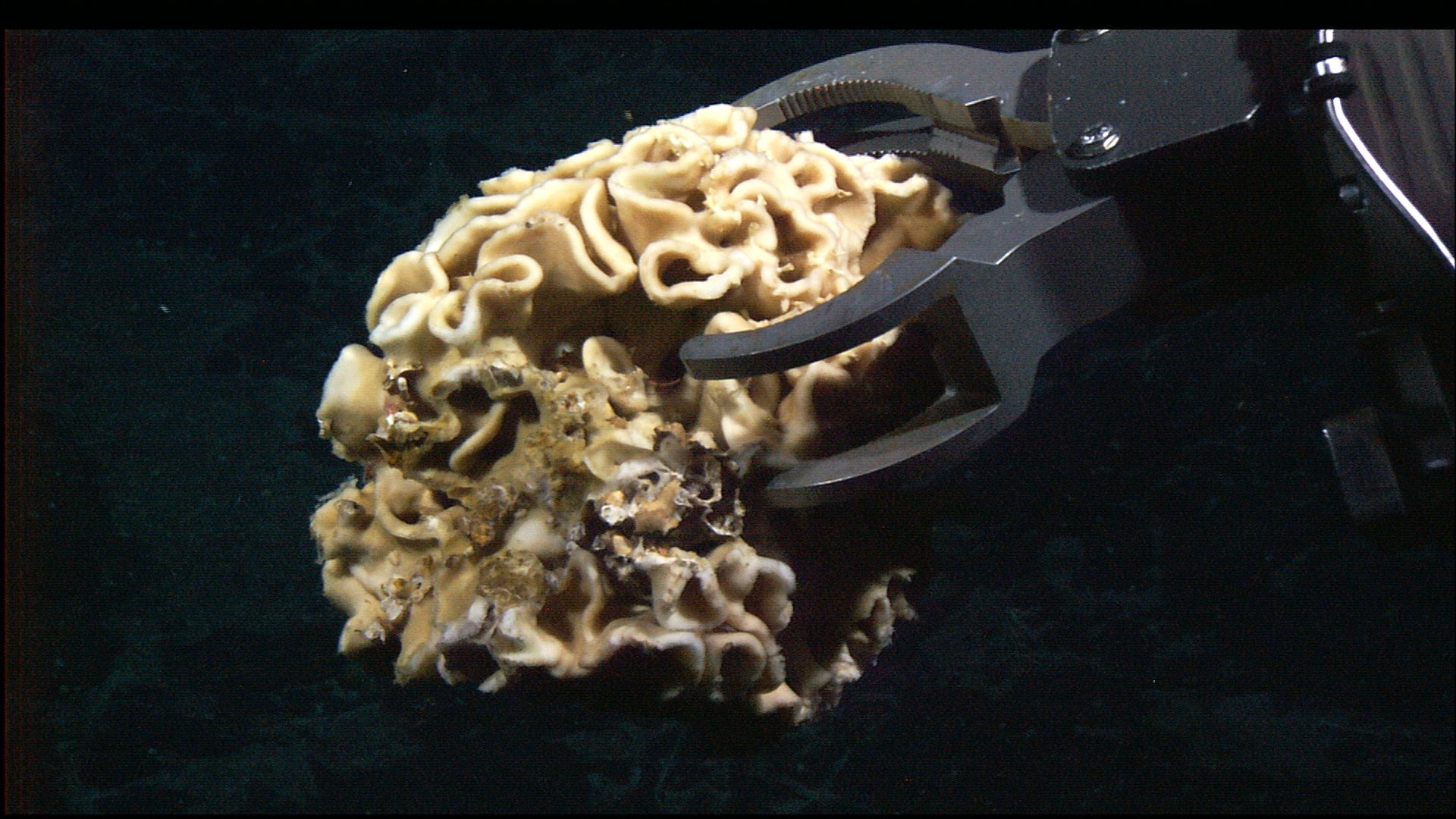
A large 20-cm wide xenophyophore

Xenophyophores are unicellular, but have many nuclei. Many form delicate and elaborate agglutinated tests—shells often made of calcium carbonate (CaCO_{3}) and other foreign mineral particles glued together with organic cements—that range from a few millimetres to 20 centimetres across. The softness and structure of tests varies from soft and lumpy shapes to fans and complex structures.

Some xenophyophores—notably Psammina—have compartmentalized tests consisting of multiple chambers.

Species of this group are morphologically variable, but the general structural pattern includes a test enclosing a branching system of organic tubules together with masses of waste material.

A number of unique terms are used to refer to anatomical aspects of the group:

- Individual waste pellets are referred to as stercomes or stercomata; pellets that are bundled together in long strings are referred to as stercomares. Stercomares also include small, yellow-red spherical bodies known as xanthosomes.
- Xenophyophores also commonly have abundant crystals of barite called granellae within their cytoplasm. This is not to be confused with the granellare, which refers to the plasma body and its tube.
- Linellae are long (several mm in length), threadlike structures found outside of the granellare in some xenophyophores (genera traditionally grouped together as "stannomida"); they are flexible and form part of the test.
- Xenophyae, for which the group is named, are the agglutinated particles from which the test is constructed. They vary by species; they can contain sediment particles, sponge spicules, radiolarian tests, and even the tests of smaller foraminifera.

The protoplasm of xenophyophores contributes less than 1% of the total mass of the organism.

They select certain minerals and elements from their environment that are included in its tests and cytoplasm, or concentrated in excretions. The selected minerals vary with species, but often include barite, lead and uranium. The granellare of Shinkaiya have been found to contain high concentrations of mercury.

Studies have found unusually high concentrations of radioactive nuclides in xenophyophores; this was first reported in Occultammina but has since been found to be true of many other xenophyophore species from different parts of the ocean.

== Growth and reproduction ==
Very little is known about xenophyophore reproduction. It is assumed that an alternation of generations takes place, as in other foraminifera; however, this has not been confirmed.

Gametes form in a specialised part of the granellare that may look like swollen side-branch (in Psammetta) or a stalked bulb (in Cerelasma). Gametes are reportedly about 20 μm in diameter, with two flagella; after this, an amoeba-like stage seems to be present. It is also possible that the amoeboid stage represents amoeboid gametes, found in other foraminifera. These amoeboid structures are also sometimes found inside the granellare. Juveniles have occasionally been found in association with adults; in Psametta they are horseshoe-shaped and already covered in xenophyae.

The location of the initial plasma can sometimes be pointed out in adult xenophyophores. In some species this is denoted by a sharp change in the type of xenophyae; in others, the juvenile is regular and the adult is irregular; still others flip this pattern, so that the juvenile is irregular and the adult is regular.

Growth is episodic; one observational study taking place over a period of eight months saw a three-to-tenfold growth in specimens of Reticulammina labyrinthica. This growth occurred in phases lasting 2–3 days each; each phase was separated by a resting period of approximately two months. These growth phases were approximately synchronous between specimens, but it is unclear if this is biologically or developmentally controlled; some evidence suggests the synchrony may have been due to chance.

Each episode of growth occurred in three phases: first, the base becomes wider and flatter, causing the surface texture to become smoother; then, the original shape of the organism is regained (albeit larger); and finally, the surface texture is rebuilt. The rapid rate of growth observed suggests that xenophyophores may not be as long-lived as previously hypothesised.

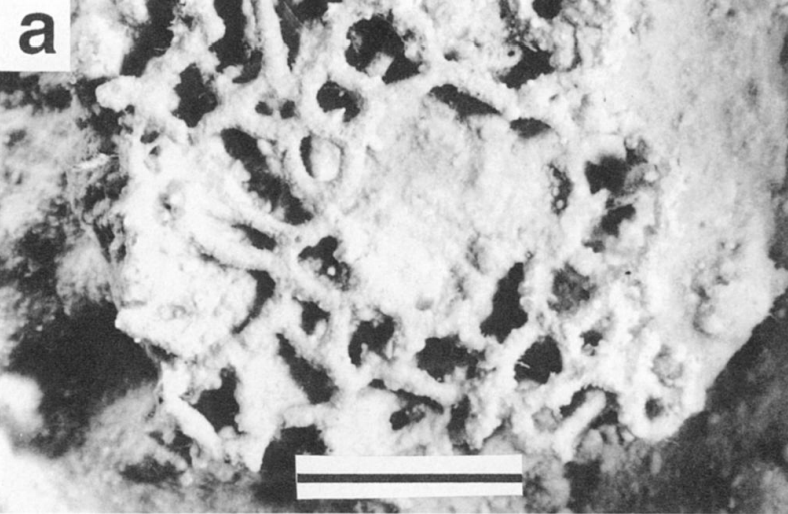
Occultammina sp. from the Porcupine Abyssal Plain in the NE Atlantic, from a depth of about 4800m.

== Habitat and range ==
Xenophyophores are an important part of the deep sea-floor, as they have been found in all four major ocean basins. They are often found in areas of enhanced organic carbon flux, such as beneath productive surface waters, in sub-marine canyons, in settings with sloped topography (e.g. seamounts, abyssal hills) and on continental slopes. They are not found in areas of hypoxic waters.

Xenophyophores have been found between depths of 500 and 10,600 metres. Most are epifaunal (living atop the seabed), but one species (Occultammina profunda), is known to be infaunal; it buries itself up to 6 centimetres (2.4 in) deep into the sediment.

Xenophyophore densities are highest on soft sediments; however, they may still be found on rocky substrates including basalts, canyon walls, and manganese crusts.

== Feeding ==
The diet and feeding ecology of xenophyophores was long the subject of speculation; the fragile tests and deepwater habitat of the group makes in vivo observation difficult. Early propositions included suspension feeding, bacterial farming, deposit feeding, and trapping particulate matter inside the test. Studies have since confirmed active uptake of food from surrounding sediments using the pseudopodia and using the test to trap particles. Analysis of lipid concentrations within xenophyophores revealed especially high concentrations of bacteria in the stercomata, suggesting that xenophyophores utilise bacteria growing on their waste products in order to supplement their feeding.

A 2021 study that utilised isotopic labeling to examine the question of xenophyophore feeding confirmed rapid uptake of both diatoms and dissolved organic matter in the form of glucose. This study found no evidence to support a bacterial farming function for the test, and instead proposed that it aided to function in the collection of phytodetritus by increasing surface area. These authors argued that xenophyophores fill a major role in ocean-floor biogeochemical cycling.

== Fossil record ==
As of 2017, no positively-identified xenophyophore fossils had been discovered.

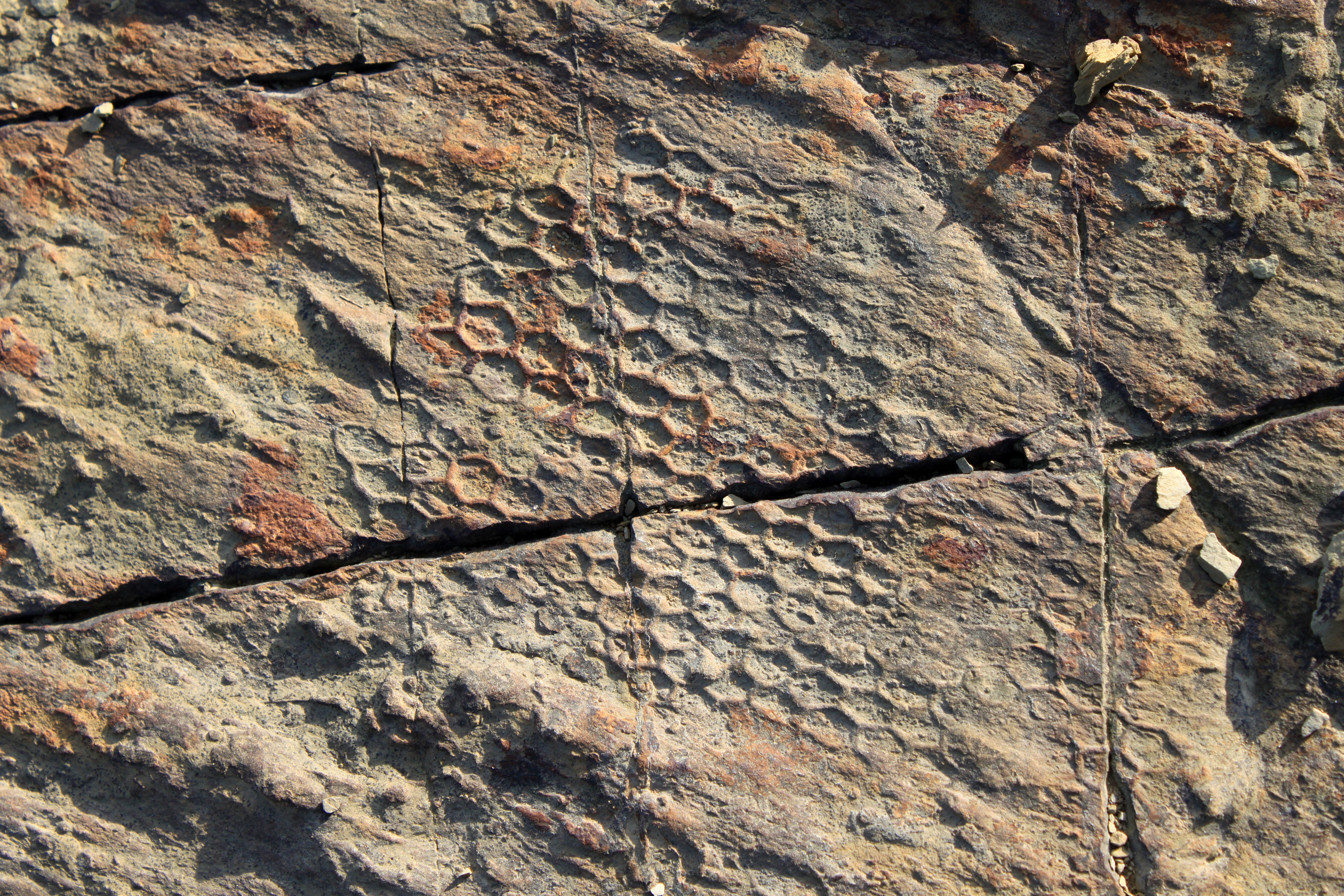
Paleodictyon has been suggested as a fossil xenophyophore, but this remains controversial.

It has been suggested that the mysterious Vendobionta of the Ediacaran period represent fossil xenophyophores. However, the discovery of C_{27} sterols associated with the fossils of Dickinsonia cast doubt on this identification, as these sterols are today associated only with animals. These researchers suggest that Dickinsonia and relatives are instead stem-bilaterians. Other Ediacaran fossils, such as Palaeopascichnus, Intrites, Yelovichnus, and Neonereites have been posited as fossil xenophyophores and linked to the Eocene fossil Benkovacina. However, analysis of the latter found neither barite crystals nor evidence of agglutinated foraminifera in the wall. A 2011 study that examined growth and development of Palaeopascichnus concluded it was likely not a xenophyophore. A 2014 study of Pteridinum reached similar conclusions.

Some researchers have suggested that the enigmatic graphoglyptids Paleodictyon, known from the early Cambrian through recent times, could represent the remains of xenophyophores, and noted the similarity of the extant xenophyophore Occultammina to the fossil. Supporting this notion is the similar abyssal habitat of living xenophyophores to the inferred habitat of fossil graphoglyptids; however, the large size (up to 0.5m) and regularity of many graphoglyptids as well as the apparent absence of xenophyae in their fossils casts doubt on the possibility. Modern examples of Paleodictyon have been discovered; however, no evidence of tests, stercomares, grannelares, or xenophyophore DNA was found, and the trace may alternately represent a burrow or a glass sponge.

Certain Carboniferous fossils have been suggested to represent the remains of xenophyophores due to the concentration of barium within the fossils as well as supposed morphological similarity; however, the barium content was later determined to be due to diagenetic alteration of the material and the morphology of the specimen instead supported an algal affinity.

== Ecology ==
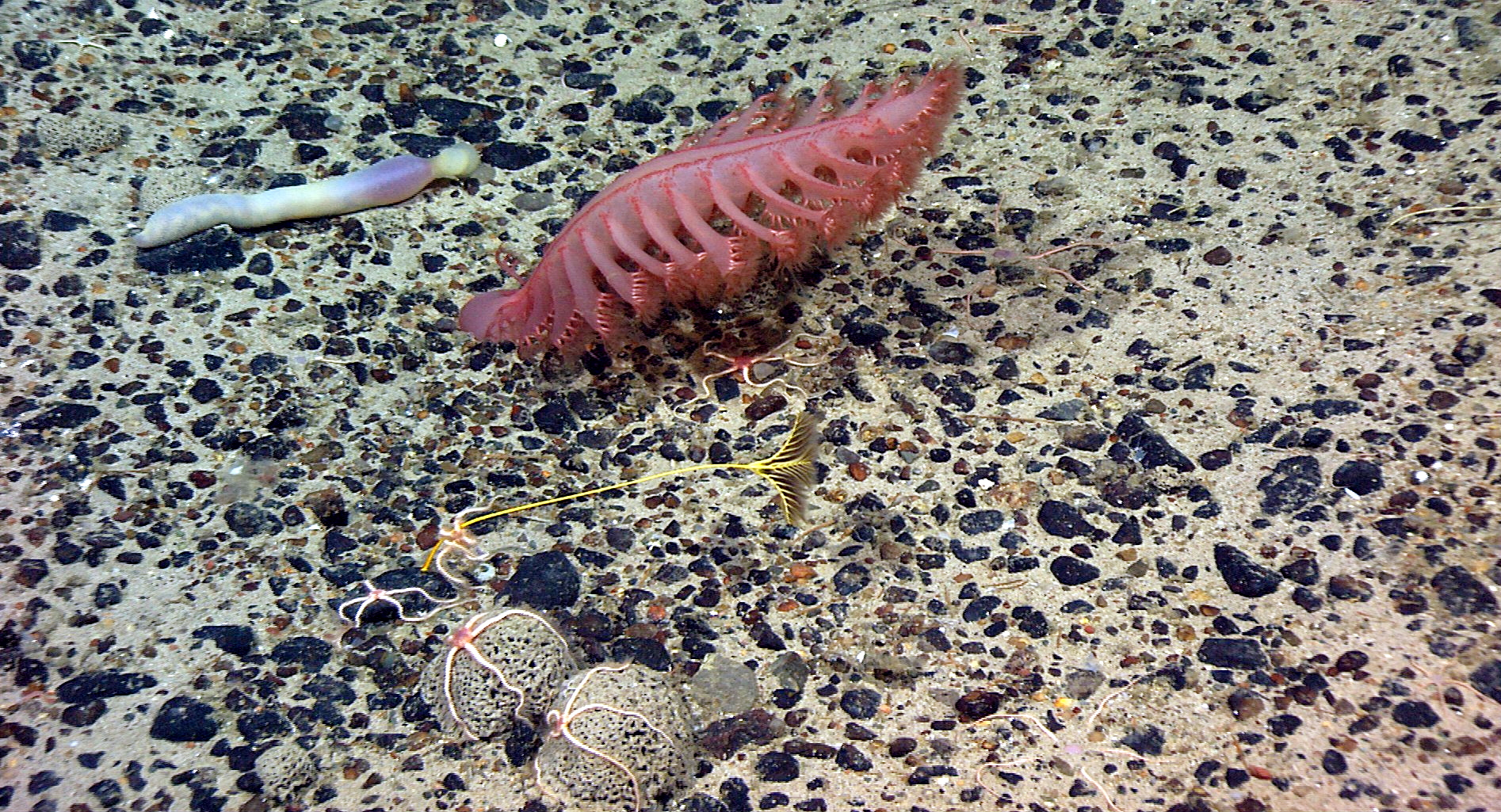
A deep sea community of organisms, including several xenophyophores; the two large individuals in the bottom middle have brittle stars on top.

Local population densities may be as high as 2,000 individuals per 100 square metres (1,100 sq ft), making them dominant organisms in some areas. Xenophyophores have been found to be "ecosystem engineers", providing habitat and serving as traps for organic particles, increasing diversity in the surrounding area. Research has shown that areas dominated by xenophyophores have 3–4 times the number of benthic crustaceans, echinoderms, and molluscs than equivalent areas that lack xenophyophores. The xenophyophores themselves also play commensal host to a number of organisms—such as isopods (e.g., genus Hebefustis), sipunculan and polychaete worms, nematodes, and harpacticoid copepods—some of which may take up semi-permanent residence within a xenophyophore's test. Brittle stars (Ophiuroidea) also appear to have a relationship with xenophyophores, as they are consistently found directly underneath or on top of the protozoans. They can also function as nurseries for fish; snailfish have been found to lay eggs in the shelter of the xenophyophore test.

Starfish, monoplacophorans, and molpadiid sea cucumbers have all been observed feeding on xenophyophores; specifically, the monoplacophoran Neopilina galatheae has been proposed as a specialised predator of the group.

Despite this abundance, the relatively low amount of protoplasm per unit of test means that xenophyophores often contribute little to total biomass.

Xenophyophores are difficult to study due to their extreme fragility. Specimens are invariably damaged during sampling, rendering them useless for captive study or cell culture. For this reason, very little is known of their life history. As they occur in all the world's oceans and in great numbers, xenophyophores could be indispensable agents in the process of sediment deposition and in maintaining biological diversity in benthic ecosystems.

Scientists in the submersible DSV Alvin at a depth of 3,088 metres at the Alaskan continental margin in the Gulf of Alaska collected a spatangoid urchin, Cystochinus loveni, about 5 cm diameter, which was wearing a cloak consisting of over 1,000 protists and other creatures, including 245 living xenophyophores, mainly Psammina species, each 3–6 mm. The fragility of the xenophyophores suggests that the urchin either very carefully collected them, or that they settled and grew there. Among several possible explanations for the urchin's behaviour, perhaps the most likely are chemical camouflage and weighing itself down to avoid being moved in currents.

Different xenophyophore ecomorphs are found in different settings; reticulated or heavily folded genera such as Reticulammina and Syringammina are more common in areas where the substrate is sloped or near canyon walls, while more fan-shaped forms like Stannophyllum are more common in areas with quieter water and/or lower primary productivity.

== List of genera ==
- Syringammina
- Occultammina
- Aschemonella
- Psammina
- Galatheammina
- Semipsammina
- Stannophyllum
- Semipsammina
- Homogammina
- Rhizammina
- Shinkaiya
- Cerelasma
- Spiculammina
- Bizarria
- Tendalia
- Nazareammina
- Cerelpemma
- Maudammina
- Psametta
- Stannoma
- Maudammina
- Cerelpemma?
- Holopsamma
- Abyssalia
- Moanammina

== See also ==
- Coenocyte
- Extremophile
- Piezophile
