= The Dark Side of the Moon (2009 album) =

Collaborative rock album by The Flaming Lips

The Flaming Lips and Stardeath and White Dwarfs with Henry Rollins and Peaches Doing The Dark Side of the Moon

Studio album by The Flaming Lips, Stardeath and White Dwarfs, Henry Rollins, and Peaches
- Released: December 22, 2009
- Genre: Alternative rock; psychedelic rock
- Length: 41:00
- Label: Warner Bros.
- Producer: The Flaming Lips

The Flaming Lips chronology
Embryonic (2009)	The Dark Side of the Moon (2009)	The Flaming Lips and Heady Fwends (2012)

Stardeath and White Dwarfs chronology
The Birth (2009)	The Dark Side of the Moon (2009)

Peaches chronology
I Feel Cream (2009)	The Dark Side of the Moon (2009)	Rub (2015)

Professional ratings
Review scores
Source	Rating
AllMusic	4/5 stars
The A.V. Club	C
Beats Per Minute	28%
Consequence of Sound	4/5 stars
Now	3/5 stars
Pitchfork	5.2/10
Record Collector	3/5 stars
Rolling Stone	2.5/5 stars
Slant Magazine	2.5/5 stars
Uncut	8/10

The Flaming Lips and Stardeath and White Dwarfs with Henry Rollins and Peaches Doing The Dark Side of the Moon is a collaborative studio album by American rock band The Flaming Lips. The album is a complete track-for-track reimagining of Pink Floyd's seminal 1973 album The Dark Side of the Moon.

The album was released through the iTunes Store on December 22, 2009, and was released on other digital music retailers a week later.

On April 17, 2010, Warner Bros. released 5,000 copies of The Flaming Lips and Stardeath and White Dwarfs with Henry Rollins and Peaches Doing The Dark Side of the Moon on 12" seafoam green vinyl as part of Record Store Day. Upon release the record was released on both seafoam green and clear vinyl with a CD copy of the album included.

== Background ==
The recording's existence was revealed by Flaming Lips' frontman Wayne Coyne before a special promotional concert at the Ricardo Montalbán Theater in Hollywood. The album was recorded with the band Stardeath and White Dwarfs, and features singer Henry Rollins recreating the original album's interview samples. The album also features the singer Peaches who performed Clare Torry's vocal segment of "The Great Gig in the Sky".

== Track listing ==
For writing credits, see the original album's article. All songs published by World Copyrights Ltd.

No.	Title	Length
1.	"Speak to Me/Breathe" (featuring Henry Rollins and Peaches)	5:19
2.	"On the Run" (featuring Henry Rollins)	3:55
3.	"Time/Breathe (Reprise)"	4:57
4.	"The Great Gig in the Sky" (featuring Henry Rollins and Peaches)	3:57
5.	"Money" (featuring Henry Rollins)	5:31
6.	"Us and Them" (featuring Henry Rollins)	7:45
7.	"Any Colour You Like"	2:42
8.	"Brain Damage" (featuring Henry Rollins)	4:42
9.	"Eclipse" (featuring Henry Rollins)	2:12
Total length:		41:00

== Track performances ==
- Track 1 is performed by the Flaming Lips & Stardeath and White Dwarfs featuring Henry Rollins & Peaches.
- Tracks 2 and 9 by the Flaming Lips & Stardeath and White Dwarfs featuring Henry Rollins.
- Track 3 by Stardeath and White Dwarfs
- Track 4 by the Flaming Lips featuring Henry Rollins & Peaches.
- Tracks 5 and 6 by the Flaming Lips featuring Henry Rollins.
- Track 7 by the Flaming Lips & Stardeath and White Dwarfs.
- Track 8 by Stardeath and White Dwarfs featuring Henry Rollins.

== Personnel ==
- Wayne Coyne – vocals, guitar, keyboard
- Michael Ivins – bass, keyboards, backing vocals
- Steven Drozd – guitar, keyboards, bass, drums, vocals
- Kliph Scurlock – drums, percussion
- Dennis Coyne – vocals, guitar, keyboard
- James Young – guitar
- Casey Joseph – bass, keyboard
- Matt Duckworth – drums, percussion
- Henry Rollins – vocals
- Peaches – vocals

== Charts ==
Chart (2010)	Position
US Billboard 200	157
