= Pink Floyd 1974 tours =

1974 concert tours by Pink Floyd

The English rock group Pink Floyd played two tours in 1974. As well as performing the hit album The Dark Side of the Moon live, the band introduced new material that would eventually be recorded on the albums Wish You Were Here and Animals. Part of the tour was sponsored by the soft drink company Gini.

The tour was commercially successful, and featured improved lighting and a new video display system named "Mr Screen". However, the music was criticised in the press for being uninspiring and too similar to the studio albums.

== 1974 French Summer Tour ==
French Summer Tour 1974
- Tour by Pink Floyd
- Promotional poster for the concerts in France
- Location: France
- Associated album: The Dark Side of the Moon
- Start date: 18 June 1974
- End date: 26 June 1974
- Legs: 2
- No. of shows: 27 (29 scheduled)

Pink Floyd concert chronology
- Dark Side of the Moon Tour (1972–1973); Pink Floyd 1974 tours (1974); Wish You Were Here Tour (1975)

The 1974 French Summer Tour, was a short concert tour running from 18 to 26 June. The group wanted to upgrade their stage presentations and create a bigger visual impact, and the shows were a warm-up for the major British tour planned later in the year.

The first date of the tour was recorded by France's Europe 1 radio, with segments broadcast later in the year. It featured the debut of "Shine On You Crazy Diamond" (with the two halves played as one, as on the British 1974 tour) and "Raving and Drooling". The 22 June gig was the last time "Careful with that Axe, Eugene" was played aside from a one-off performance in 1977, while the last date on the tour, 26 June, was the last time "One of These Days" was played until 1987.

The French tour was the first time Pink Floyd used their iconic 40-foot (12 m) circular display called "Mr. Screen". Ian Emes was recruited to create various animated sequences for parts of The Dark Side of the Moon. The screen caused logistical problems finding suitable venues, and consequently several shows were cancelled or moved dates. The tour was promoted by the soft drinks company Gini, which had been agreed to two years before. The contract required a series of press promotional photographs, and a song for television advertising, written by Roger Waters and called "Bitter Love". The group were unhappy about the promotion, and donated their fee to charity.

On 25 June, the band were challenged to a football match by a group of journalists. They defeated the group 4–3.

=== Tour dates ===
Date	City	Country	Venue
18 June 1974	Toulouse	France	Palais des Expositions
19 June 1974	Poitiers	France	Parc des Expositions
21 June 1974	Dijon	France	Palais des Expositions
22 June 1974	Colmar	France	Théâtre de Plein Air, Parc des Expositions
24 June 1974	Paris	France	Palais des Sports
25 June 1974	Paris	France	Palais des Sports
26 June 1974	Paris	France	Palais des Sports

Source : Povey 2007 p. 192

=== Set list ===
The following set list was performed during the tour.

First set:

1. "Shine On You Crazy Diamond"
2. "Raving and Drooling"
3. "Echoes"

Second set: The Dark Side of the Moon

4. "Speak to Me" (extended tape)
5. "Breathe"
6. "On the Run"
7. "Time"
8. "The Great Gig in the Sky"
9. "Money"
10. "Us and Them"
11. "Any Colour You Like"
12. "Brain Damage"
13. "Eclipse"

Encore:

14. "Careful With That Axe, Eugene"

Notes

- During the concerts in Paris, "Careful With That Axe, Eugene" was replaced by "One of These Days".

== 1974 British Winter Tour ==
British Winter Tour 1974
- Tour by Pink Floyd
- Ticket for the 17 November Wembley show. Note 3pm start time.
- Location: United Kingdom
- Associated album: The Dark Side of the Moon
- Start date: 4 November 1974
- End date: 14 December 1974
- Legs: 2
- No. of shows: 27 (29 scheduled)

Pink Floyd concert chronology
- Dark Side of the Moon Tour (1972–1973); Pink Floyd 1974 tours (1974); Wish You Were Here Tour (1975)

Pink Floyd's British Winter Tour '74, was a short series of gigs that November and December. They featured the debut of "You Gotta Be Crazy". Pete Revell joined as screen projectionist for the tour; lighting engineer Arthur Max was retained from earlier tours but fired after a few shows. Gerald Scarfe collaborated with the band for the first time, designing the tour programme.

The 16 November show was recorded by BBC Radio One and the performance of Dark Side of the Moon was later broadcast on the Alan Freeman Show on 11 January 1975. (Note: The opening line of taped dialog in "Speak To Me" - "I've been mad for fucking years" was censored.) This recording is included in the 2011 Dark Side of the Moon and Wish You Were Here box sets, except for "Echoes" which was released on 11 November 2016, as part of the 27-disc box set, The Early Years 1965–1972 which make up Live at the Empire Pool.

Although the tour was commercially successful, with every gig sold out, it was criticised in the press, and drew a backlash from reviewers, including journalist Nick Kent. He reviewed the 14 November gig for New Musical Express and disliked the new material, saying it was over-long and unimpressive, and criticised Gilmour's personal appearance. A report in the Bristol Evening Post complained that the performance of The Dark Side of the Moon was identical to the studio version, "and that's something one doesn't go to concerts for".

=== Tour dates ===
Date	City	Country	Venue	Notes
4 November 1974	Edinburgh	Scotland	Usher Hall	
5 November 1974	Edinburgh	Scotland	Usher Hall	
8 November 1974	Newcastle upon Tyne	England	Newcastle Odeon	
9 November 1974	Newcastle upon Tyne	England	Newcastle Odeon	
14 November 1974	London	England	Empire Pool	
15 November 1974	London	England	Empire Pool	Recorded by the BBC.
16 November 1974	London	England	Empire Pool	Recorded by the BBC.
17 November 1974	London	England	Empire Pool	
19 November 1974	Stoke-on-Trent	England	Trentham Gardens	
22 November 1974	Cardiff	Wales	Sophia Gardens Pavilion	Last performance in Wales
28 November 1974	Liverpool	England	Liverpool Empire Theatre	
29 November 1974	Liverpool	England	Liverpool Empire Theatre	
30 November 1974	Liverpool	England	Liverpool Empire Theatre	
3 December 1974	Birmingham	England	The Hippodrome	
4 December 1974	Birmingham	England	The Hippodrome	
5 December 1974	Birmingham	England	The Hippodrome	
9 December 1974	Manchester	England	The Palace Theatre	
10 December 1974	Manchester	England	The Palace Theatre	
13 December 1974	Bristol	England	The Hippodrome	
14 December 1974	Bristol	England	The Hippodrome	

Source : Povey 2007 pp. 193-194

=== Set list ===
The following set list was performed during the tour:

First set:

1. "Shine On You Crazy Diamond"
2. "Raving and Drooling"
3. "You've Got to Be Crazy"

Second set: The Dark Side of the Moon

4. "Speak to Me" (extended tape)
5. "Breathe"
6. "On the Run"
7. "Time"
8. "The Great Gig in the Sky"
9. "Money"
10. "Us and Them"
11. "Any Colour You Like"
12. "Brain Damage"
13. "Eclipse"

Encore:

14. "Echoes"

Notes

- During the concert on 17 November 1974 in London, "Shine On You Crazy Diamond" was performed after "You've Got to Be Crazy".

== Personnel ==
Pink Floyd

- David Gilmour – guitars, vocals, organ on "The Great Gig in the Sky"
- Roger Waters – bass, vocals
- Richard Wright – keyboards, vocals
- Nick Mason – drums, percussion

Additional musicians:

- Dick Parry – saxophone on "Money", "Us and Them", and "Echoes"
- The Blackberries (Venetta Fields & Carlena Williams) – backing vocals
