= Live at the Empire Pool =

Live album by Pink Floyd
- Released: 26 September 2011; 7 November 2011; 11 November 2016; 24 March 2023
- Recorded: 15 November 1974; 16 November 1974
- Venues: Empire Pool, Wembley Park, London
- Genre: Progressive rock
- Length: 131 minutes (approx.)
- Language: English
- Labels: Pink Floyd Records, Legacy Recordings

Live at the Empire Pool is a live concert recording by the progressive rock band Pink Floyd, recorded by BBC Radio 1.

== Overview ==
Ticket for the 17 November show at Wembley, part of the same run as the recorded shows. Note 3pm start time.

The album was recorded during the British Winter Tour, 1974 at the Empire Pool (now Wembley Arena), Wembley, England. The shows are notable for showcasing an early version of "Shine On You Crazy Diamond" as well as very early versions of "Sheep" and "Dogs" under different titles – "Raving and Drooling" and "You've Got to Be Crazy", respectively. The tour also featured the whole of The Dark Side of the Moon album played as well as one of the final performances of "Echoes" before being resurrected briefly in 1987; this performance of "Echoes" featured saxophone by Dick Parry.

The show was recorded by the BBC and broadcast on BBC Radio 1 (Dark Side set only), on 11 January 1975 as part of Alan Freeman's programme.

The tracks on the Wish You Were Here Immersion box set were recorded on 15 November 1974. The tracks from "Speak To Me" to "The Great Gig in the Sky" were recorded on 16 November 1974, while the tracks from "Money" to "Eclipse" were recorded on 15 November 1974, with patches from the 16th. "Echoes" was recorded on 16 November 1974.

== Release ==
The record has not been released as a standalone album, but has been released in segments as part of other Pink Floyd releases; namely the Dark Side of the Moon and Wish You Were Here immersion box sets (2011) and The Early Years 1965-1972 box set (2016).

The first three tracks were released as part of the Wish You Were Here Immersion box set in November 2011. The whole performance of Dark Side of the Moon was released two months earlier, in September 2011 as part of the Dark Side of the Moon Immersion box set. The encore, "Echoes", was not released until November 2016 when it was included in The Early Years 1965–1972 box set as part of Volume 7: 1967–1972 Continu/ation.

On 24 March 2023 the performance of The Dark Side of the Moon featured as part of the album's 50th anniversary box set on CD and vinyl, newly remastered; and was also released as a standalone album on CD and vinyl with the title The Dark Side of the Moon Live at Wembley 1974 – these marked its first availability on vinyl, albeit with some of the songs edited to fit within the medium's limitations. "Shine On You Crazy Diamond", "You've Got to Be Crazy", "Raving and Drooling", and "Echoes" are still exclusive to their previously mentioned box set releases.

== Track listing ==
The full album list is as follows:

The following tracks can be found in the Experience 2-CD and Immersion box set editions of Wish You Were Here (2011):

1. "Shine On You Crazy Diamond" (early version)
2. "Raving and Drooling" (early version of "Sheep")
3. "You've Got to Be Crazy" (early version of "Dogs")

The following tracks can be found in the Experience 2-CD and Immersion box set editions of The Dark Side of the Moon (2011); in The Dark Side of the Moon 50th Anniversary box set (2023) and on the standalone album The Dark Side of the Moon Live at Wembley 1974 (2023):

1. "Speak to Me" (extended tape)
2. "Breathe"
3. "On the Run"
4. "Time"
5. "The Great Gig in the Sky" (The LP version fades out)
6. "Money" (Truncated on LP)
7. "Us and Them"
8. "Any Colour You Like" (Truncated on LP)
9. "Brain Damage"
10. "Eclipse" (Truncated on LP)

The following track can be found in Volume 7: 1967–1972 Continu/ation of The Early Years 1965–1972 box set (2016):

1. "Echoes"

== Personnel ==
Pink Floyd

- David Gilmour – guitar, lead and backing vocals, pedal steel guitar on "Shine on You Crazy Diamond," and "The Great Gig in the Sky," Synthi AKS on “On the Run,” Hammond organ on "The Great Gig in the Sky"
- Roger Waters – bass, lead and backing vocals, additional keyboards on "Echoes"
- Richard Wright – organs, electric and acoustic pianos, synthesizers, backing and lead vocals, Azimuth Co-ordinator
- Nick Mason – drums, rototoms

with

- Dick Parry – saxophones
- The Blackberries
  - Venetta Fields – backing vocals
  - Carlena Williams – backing vocals
