= The Birth (album) =

Studio album by Stardeath and White Dwarfs
- Released: June 9, 2009
- Genre: Alternative rock, neo-psychedelia, psychedelic pop
- Label: Warner Bros.
- Producer: Trent Bell, Josh Jones, Greg Kurstin, Philip Rice

Stardeath and White Dwarfs chronology
| Stardeath and White Dwarfs EP (2005) | The Birth (2009) | The Dark Side of the Moon (2009) |

Professional ratings
Review scores
| Source | Rating |
|---|---|
| Allmusic | 3/5 stars |
| Tiny Mix Tapes | 2.5/5 marks |
| PopMatters | 5/10 |

The Birth is the debut studio album by American rock band Stardeath and White Dwarfs.

== Track listing ==
| No. | Title | Length |
|---|---|---|
| 1. | "The Sea is on Fire" | 3:33 |
| 2. | "New Heat" | 3:19 |
| 3. | "Keep Score" | 2:40 |
| 4. | "The Birth" | 4:16 |
| 5. | "Those Who Are From the Sun Return to the Sun" | 2:25 |
| 6. | "I Can't Get Away" | 3:15 |
| 7. | "The Age of The Freak" | 2:54 |
| 8. | "Country Ballad" | 4:20 |
| 9. | "The March" | 2:36 |
| 10. | "Smoking Pot Makes Me Not Want to Kill Myself" | 4:55 |
