= Stardeath and White Dwarfs =

American experimental rock band

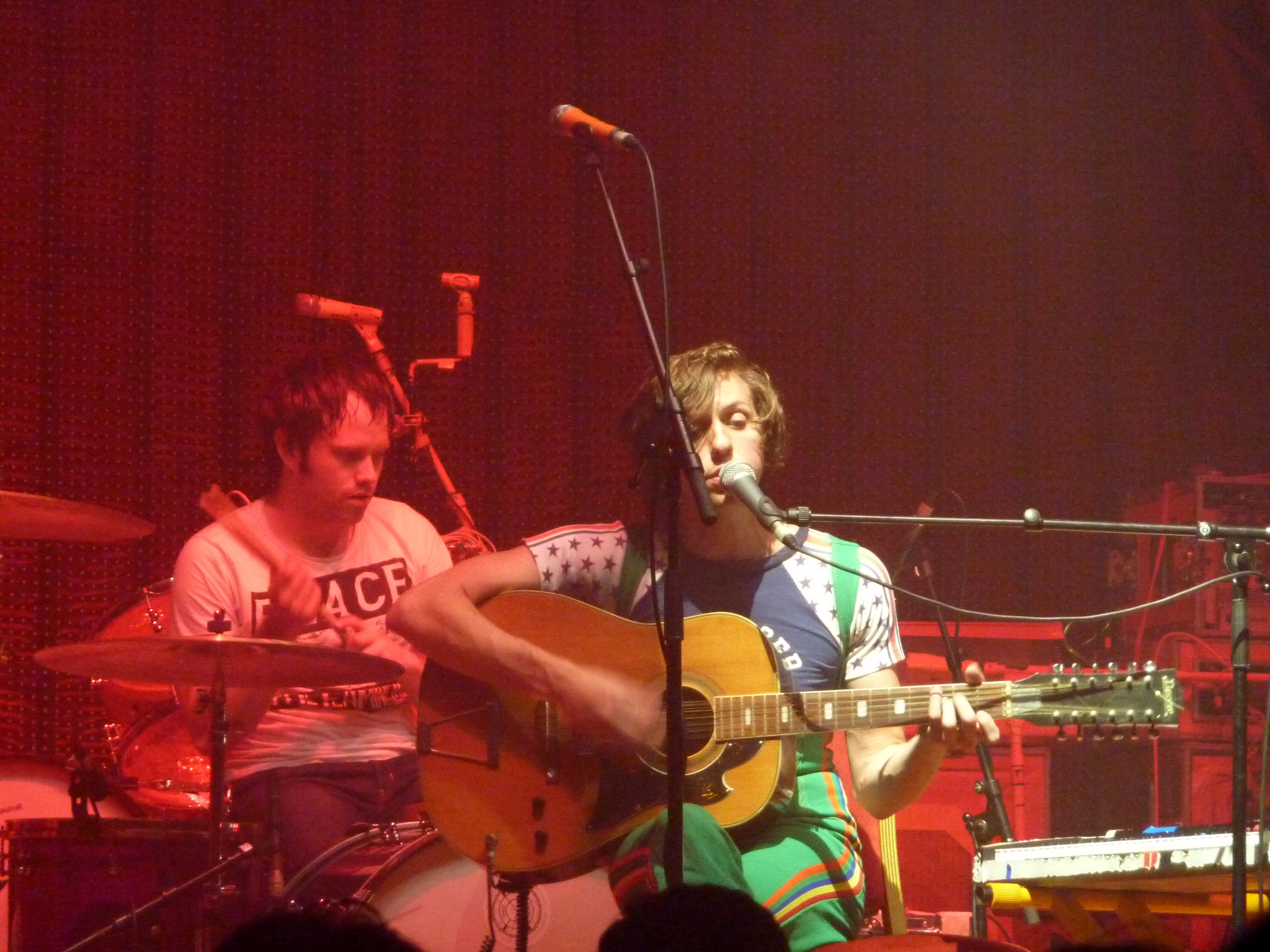
- Stardeath and White Dwarfs live in London

Background information
- Origin: Oklahoma City, United States
- Genres: Experimental rock Psychedelic rock Alternative rock
- Years active: 2004– present
- Label: Warner Bros.
- Members: Dennis Coyne; Casey Joseph; Matt Duckworth; Ford Chastain
- Past members: James Young; Philip Rice; Josh Jones
- Website: Official Band Page

Stardeath and White Dwarfs is an experimental rock band from Norman, Oklahoma, formed in late 2004. The band has released two albums, one single ("Toast & Marmalade For Tea" on Half Machine Records) and an EP, as well as contributing to The Flaming Lips' 2009 remake of The Dark Side of the Moon by Pink Floyd.

The band consists of Dennis Coyne, Casey Joseph, Matt Duckworth and Ford Chastain. Lead singer Coyne is the nephew of Flaming Lips lead singer Wayne Coyne.

They released the "That's Cool" EP in 2005. They released their first full-length album, entitled The Birth, on vinyl (with digital download) on May 19, 2009, and on CD on June 9, 2009, on Warner Brothers.

Stardeath and White Dwarfs have toured with Deerhoof, British Sea Power, Band of Horses, Starlight Mints, Explosions in the Sky, Tame Impala, and The Flaming Lips. They have opened for The Flaming Lips at the Tulsa, Oklahoma D-Fest Festival 2007, on their New Year's Eve shows in 2007 and 2008, and during a brief tour in 2009. They also played the 2008 Wakarusa Festival.

In the fall of 2012, Stardeath and White Dwarfs began playing shows with New Fumes, Linear Downfall, and Spaceface. Around the same time, they collaborated with The Flaming Lips, along with New Fumes, Linear Downfall and Spaceface, to do another song-for-song cover of an album. This time, it was the classic debut of King Crimson, In the Court of the Crimson King. They called it Playing Hide and Seek With the Ghosts of Dawn, and released it in November 2012. In 2013 they contributed to The Time Has Come to Shoot You Down... What a Sound, a reworking of the Stone Roses debut album, also with The Flaming Lips, New Fumes and friends.

== Discography ==
- That's Cool (EP, 2005)
- The Birth (LP, 2009)
- The Flaming Lips and Stardeath and White Dwarfs With Henry Rollins and Peaches Doing The Dark Side of the Moon (LP, 2009)
- Playing Hide and Seek With the Ghosts of Dawn (LP, 2012)
- Wastoid (LP, 2014)
- What Keeps You Up at Night (EP, 2015)
