= The Flaming Lips and Heady Fwends =

- Standard edition cover

Studio album by the Flaming Lips
- Released: April 21, 2012
- Recorded: 2011–2012
- Genre: Experimental rock; psychedelic rock
- Length: 69:17
- Label: Warner Bros., Lovely Sorts of Death, Bella Union
- Producer: The Flaming Lips, Dave Fridmann

The Flaming Lips chronology
The Flaming Lips and Stardeath and White Dwarfs with Henry Rollins and Peaches Doing The Dark Side of the Moon (2009)	The Flaming Lips and Heady Fwends (2012)	The Terror (2013)

CD/Digital cover

The Flaming Lips and Heady Fwends is the first album in the "Fwends" series by the American rock band the Flaming Lips in collaboration with a variety of guests.

Recorded throughout 2011 and 2012, the album was released as a limited edition on vinyl for Record Store Day on April 21, 2012 and on CD, vinyl and digitally on June 26, 2012. Four songs from the album were previously released on collaborative EPs in 2011.

== Background ==
Following their last full-length album, 2009's Embryonic, the band produced several EPs with other artists including Neon Indian, Lightning Bolt, Prefuse 73, and Yoko Ono. Four tracks from these sessions appear on the album. The remaining seven songs were recorded at different times and locations, and are exclusive to the LP. The CD, vinyl reissue and digital releases of the album omit the track "I Don't Want You to Die" featuring Chris Martin, but feature an exclusive track with Aaron Behrens of Ghostland Observatory, "Tasered and Maced".

The Erykah Badu version of Ewan MacColl's "The First Time Ever I Saw Your Face", was a result of Lips frontman Wayne Coyne's unsolicited calls to the singer. Badu was initially opposed to covering the well-known 1957 song, but Coyne was able to convince her.

Other pairings resulted from the initiative of other artists, such as the Kesha track. Kesha had expressed interest in working with the Flaming Lips while visiting the band's hometown, Oklahoma City. She contacted Coyne by text message on his birthday. Her track, "2012 (You Must Be Upgraded)", was recorded in Kesha's home studio in Nashville.

== Reception ==
Professional ratings
Aggregate scores
Source	Rating
Metacritic	72/100
Review scores
Source	Rating
AllMusic	4/5 stars
Entertainment Weekly	A
Pitchfork	8.2/10
Spin	6/10
Clash	8/10

Pitchfork commented on the wide variety of collaborators; mainstream artists such as Kesha and Coldplay's Chris Martin share space with more experimental artists such as Lightning Bolt and Prefuse 73. Despite the disparate artists involved, Pitchfork stated "[t]his piecemeal patchwork of tracks hangs together amazingly well as a front-to-back album." The website rated the album 8.2 out of 10. Entertainment Weekly gave the album an A rating. Spin was less positive; giving a 6 out of 10 rating, they quipped that the other artists were "globetrotters on Gilligan's Acid Island". Clash commented that the numerous guests tempered the band's usual outlandish workouts but did note that "Whilst that suppressed weirdness may be a detraction to the diehard fans, it makes for the band's most accessible work since Yoshimi...."

The music video for "First Time Ever I Saw Your Face" provoked controversy between the band and guest vocalist Erykah Badu when a rough cut was leaked online that misrepresented Badu. As a result, this video was never officially released, however new vocals were recorded featuring Amanda Palmer, and a similar video to the one with Badu was filmed also featuring Palmer.

== Packaging ==
The band released the double LP in vinyl form in a 10,000 unit run on April 21, 2012, as part of Record Store Day. Each disc was hand-pressed using multiple shades of vinyl pellets and has a unique pattern. Coyne claimed that he had requested and was given blood samples from some of the album's collaborators, including Kesha and Neon Indian's Alan Palomo. His plan was to have small amounts of the blood sandwiched into the vinyl of a limited edition of the album, and make them available to "interested rich Flaming Lips people." The double LPs with blood inside were pressed at United Record Pressing in Nashville. Custom editions have been sold via the headyfwends.com site: One copy was traded for two copies of prominent United customer Jack White's blue liquid-filled 12" single "Sixteen Saltines" (a Record Store Day 2012 exclusive only available at the Third Man Records store). 10 more copies (encased in plexiglass with a photo collage cover made from the front cover photo of John Lennon and Yoko Ono's Unfinished Music No.1: Two Virgins) were sold by Wayne Coyne for $2,500 USD each (plus $200 hand-delivery fee), with the proceeds going to the Oklahoma Humane Society and the Academy of Contemporary Music at the University of Central Oklahoma. Customers who bought a copy of this edition also received a copy of the regular vinyl set for listening. The records were hand-delivered by AnatomyOne, of Oklahoma City's Womb Gallery, and photos of the buyers holding their copies were linked on Coyne's Twitter account.

== Track listing ==
=== Compact disc and digital editions ===
The Flaming Lips and Heady Fwends track listing
No.	Title	Featuring	Length
1.	"2012 (You Must Be Upgraded)"	Kesha, Biz Markie & Hour of the Time Majesty 12	4:09
2.	"Ashes in the Air"	Bon Iver	6:13
3.	"Helping the Retarded to Know God"	Edward Sharpe and the Magnetic Zeros	7:03
4.	"Supermoon Made Me Want to Pee"	Prefuse 73	3:17
5.	"Children of the Moon"	Tame Impala	5:32
6.	"That Ain't My Trip"	Jim James of My Morning Jacket	3:47
7.	"You, Man? Human???"	Nick Cave	3:34
8.	"I'm Working at NASA on Acid"	Lightning Bolt	7:59
9.	"Do It!"	Yoko Ono/Plastic Ono Band	3:28
10.	"Is David Bowie Dying?"	Neon Indian	6:36
11.	"The First Time Ever I Saw Your Face" (written by Ewan MacColl)	Erykah Badu	10:04
12.	"Girl, You're So Weird"	New Fumes	3:21
13.	"Tasered and Maced"	Aaron Behrens of Ghostland Observatory	2:43
Total length:			69:17

=== Vinyl original RSD edition ===
Side 1
No.	Title	Featuring	Length
1.	"2012 (You Must Be Upgraded)"	Kesha, Biz Markie & Hour of the Time Majesty 12	4:09
2.	"Ashes in the Air"	Bon Iver	6:13
3.	"Helping the Retarded to Know God"	Edward Sharpe and the Magnetic Zeros	7:03

Side 2
No.	Title	Featuring	Length
4.	"Supermoon Made Me Want to Pee"	Prefuse 73	3:17
5.	"Children of the Moon"	Tame Impala	5:32
6.	"That Ain't My Trip"	Jim James of My Morning Jacket	3:47
7.	"You, Man? Human???"	Nick Cave	3:34

Side 3
No.	Title	Featuring	Length
8.	"I'm Working at NASA on Acid"	Lightning Bolt	7:59
9.	"Do It!"	Yoko Ono/Plastic Ono Band	3:28
10.	"Is David Bowie Dying?"	Neon Indian	6:36

Side 4
No.	Title	Featuring	Length
11.	"The First Time Ever I Saw Your Face" (written by Ewan MacColl)	Erykah Badu	10:04
12.	"Girl, You're So Weird"	New Fumes	3:21
13.	"I Don't Want You to Die"	Chris Martin	4:09
Total length:			69:17

=== Vinyl reissue edition ===
Side 1
No.	Title	Featuring	Length
1.	"2012 (You Must Be Upgraded)"	Kesha, Biz Markie & Hour of the Time Majesty 12	4:09
2.	"Ashes in the Air"	Bon Iver	6:13
3.	"Helping the Retarded to Know God"	Edward Sharpe and the Magnetic Zeros	7:03

Side 2
No.	Title	Featuring	Length
4.	"Supermoon Made Me Want to Pee"	Prefuse 73	3:17
5.	"Children of the Moon"	Tame Impala	5:32
6.	"That Ain't My Trip"	Jim James of My Morning Jacket	3:47
7.	"You, Man? Human???"	Nick Cave	3:34

Side 3
No.	Title	Featuring	Length
8.	"I'm Working at NASA on Acid"	Lightning Bolt	7:59
9.	"Do It!"	Yoko Ono/Plastic Ono Band	3:28
10.	"Is David Bowie Dying?"	Neon Indian	6:36

Side 4
No.	Title	Featuring	Length
11.	"The First Time Ever I Saw Your Face" (written by Ewan MacColl)	Erykah Badu	10:04
12.	"Girl, You're So Weird"	New Fumes	3:21
13.	"Tasered and Maced"	Aaron Behrens of Ghostland Observatory	2:43
Total length:			69:17

Vinyl edition has locked grooves at the end of each side.
