= Gini (soft drink) =

French lemon soft drink

Gini is a French lemon soft drink created in 1971 by Perrier and which was purchased by Cadbury Schweppes in 1989. It has been manufactured by Suntory for many years. It is well known in France, where its slogan is La plus chaude des boissons froides (French for 'The hottest of cold drinks').

== Advertising ==
The drink is particularly known for its advertising strategies. The brand has often flirted with innuendo and sexuality in its advertising notably in a 1970s campaign featuring the Argentinian boxer Carlos Monzón surrounded by naked women leaping from a stallion in the desert and seizing an "erectile" bottle from the sand.

The most well-known advertisement was from 1983, directed by and with music from Serge Gainsbourg. The clip featured the French actor Pierre Cosso sharing his Gini and girlfriend with another man. Further ads featured couples drinking Gini after having had sex with the byline À quand remonte votre dernier Gini? (French for 'When was the last time you had a Gini?').

The brand was associated with the group Pink Floyd in a 1974 advertising campaign. In return for appearing in the advertisement, the brand sponsored the group's short 1974 tour in France. In his autobiography, the band's co-founder and drummer Nick Mason describes being followed around by a "frightful gaggle of groovy people in dark glasses and leather jackets sporting, gigantic Gini bitter lemon signs". Roger Waters wrote a song about the experience called "Bitter Love" and claimed that the money received was donated to charity following accusations of the band selling out.
