= Clare Torry =

English singer and songwriter (born 1949)

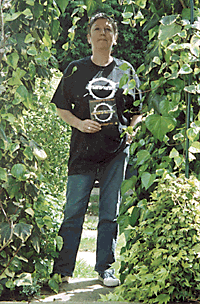
- Torry in 2003
- Born: Clare Helen Torry; 29 November 1949 (age 76); Marylebone, London, England
- Occupations: Singer; songwriter
- Known for: "The Great Gig in the Sky" by Pink Floyd (1973)

Clare Helen Torry (born 29 November 1949) is an English singer and songwriter known for her improvised singing in "The Great Gig in the Sky" (1973) by Pink Floyd, which Rolling Stone readers ranked as the second best vocal performance in rock history, behind Queen's Bohemian Rhapsody. Torry was initially paid a flat rate of £30 and denied songwriting royalties, but received joint credits for the song with keyboardist Richard Wright in 2005.

== Early life ==
Clare Helen Torry was born on 29 November 1949 at the Middlesex Hospital in Marylebone, London, to Dorothy W. Singer (1916-2017), who was secretary to six BBC directors-general, and her husband, Geoffrey Napier Torry (1916–1979), who combined careers as a lieutenant-commander in the Fleet Air Arm and a flight lieutenant in the Royal Air Force.

== Career ==
In the 1960s Torry began a career as a singer, mostly performing covers of popular songs, which included session work at Abbey Road Studios. She later worked as a staff songwriter for EMI.

=== "The Great Gig in the Sky" ===
In January 1973, Pink Floyd were finishing work on The Dark Side of the Moon at Abbey Road, and a female singer was sought to add vocals to an instrumental composition by Richard Wright to be called "The Great Gig in the Sky". Engineer Alan Parsons remembered having been impressed by Torry's voice, and she was booked for a session on 21 January.

"They simply said, 'Who shall we get to sing this?' And I said, 'Well, I know a great singer.' I just knew her through one album of hit cover versions she'd done – you know, the cover albums that proliferated in the early 1970s. They were always done in a day. And I was very impressed with her. There was a bit of direction given; they said, 'Sorry, we've got no words, no melody line, just a chord sequence – just see what you can do with it.' She was only there for a couple of hours. As I remember, she did two or three tracks, from which we assembled the best bits for a master version, but somewhere in the archives are the bits we didn't use, and I'm sure it would make for an interesting remix version one day." – Alan Parsons.

Torry's performance on the track won great acclaim. Craig Jenkins at Vulture wrote, "Torry’s performance manages to express the full range of human emotion without relying on words." He also believed that the song was "pea soup without her". Fraser Lewry of Louder said her vocals "lifted the song to celestial heights" and quipped that her hiring was "the best £30 Pink Floyd ever spent". Readers of Rolling Stone later placed it second on their list of the best vocal performances in rock history behind "Bohemian Rhapsody".

On 4 November 1973, Torry sang "The Great Gig in the Sky" at the Rainbow Theatre in London. She sang it with Roger Waters at some of his 1980s solo shows, and with Pink Floyd again at their 1990 concert at Knebworth.

In 2004, Torry sued Pink Floyd and EMI for songwriting royalties on the basis that her contribution to "The Great Gig in the Sky" constituted co-authorship with keyboardist Richard Wright. In 1973, as a session singer, she was paid only the standard flat fee of £30 for Sunday studio work (the equivalent of £326.2 today). She said in 1998, "If I'd known then what I know now, I would have done something about organising copyright or publishing." In 2005, an out-of-court settlement was reached in Torry's favour, although the terms of the settlement were not disclosed. All releases after 2005 carry an additional credit for "Vocal composition by Clare Torry" in the "Great Gig in the Sky" segment of the booklet or liner notes.

=== Later work ===
Torry contributed to Waters' 1986 soundtrack When the Wind Blows and to his second solo studio album Radio K.A.O.S.(1987). She performed as a session singer on 1970s UK TV advertisements, and as a live backing vocalist with Kevin Ayers, Olivia Newton-John, Shriekback, The Alan Parsons Project (for whom she also sang lead vocal on one track on 1979's Eve), Procol Harum mainman Gary Brooker, Matthew Fisher, Cerrone, Meat Loaf (a duet on the song "Nowhere Fast", and the hit "Modern Girl"), Johnny Mercer, and Doctors of Madness.

Torry released "Love for Living" in 1969, which was produced by Ronnie Scott and Robin Gibb. She sang the theme of the 1977 film OCE in the same style as "The Great Gig in the Sky". She also performed Dolly Parton's "Love Is Like a Butterfly" as the theme music to the BBC Television sitcom Butterflies, which was released as a single in 1981.

In the 1970s, she appeared on the French disco composer Cerrone's "Angelina", the Alan Parsons Project's "Don't Hold Back", and albums by Olivia Newton-John and Serge Gainsbourg. Her voice can be heard singing "Love to Love You Baby" (originally by Donna Summer) during the opening scene of the cult BBC Play for Today production of Abigail's Party in 1977. Torry sang backing vocals on the track "The War Song" from Culture Club's Waking Up with the House on Fire album in 1984, as well as on the track "Yellowstone Park" on the Tangerine Dream album Le Parc the following year.

Torry is also credited on the 1987 album En Dejlig Torsdag (A Lovely Thursday) by the Danish pop rock band TV-2, where she sings in a fashion similar to "The Great Gig in the Sky" at the end of the tracks "Stjernen I Mit Liv" ("The Star in my Life") and "I Baronessens Seng" ("In the Bed of the Baroness").

In February 2006, Torry released Heaven in the Sky, a collection of her early pop recordings from the 1960s and 1970s. In 2011, she released a collaboration with musician and composer John Fyffe.

== Accolades ==
On 20 October 2010, Torry was presented with a BASCA Gold Badge Award in recognition of her unique contribution to music.
