= Spaceface =

Psychedelic rock band

- Origin: Memphis, Tennessee, United States
- Genre: Psychedelic rock
- Years active: 2011–present
- Label: DistroKid, Brain Trust Records
- Members: Jake Ingalls; Matthew Strong; Eric Martin; Katie Pierce
- Website: www.spacefacemusic.com

Spaceface is a psychedelic rock band formed in Memphis, Tennessee, in 2011. Members include Jake Ingalls (formerly of The Flaming Lips), Matthew Strong (also a guitar tech for The Flaming Lips), Eric Martin, and Katie Pierce. Daniel Quinlan was a founding member, but left the band.

== History ==
Ingalls, Strong, and Martin moved in together in 2011 and began making music soon after. In 2012, the band was rounded out by additional musical members, who run the group's light show, built from a "series of on and off switches, which runs off the side of the stage." They began touring later that year. In 2014, they released their eponymous EP, Spaceface EP. Working in Ardent Studios in Memphis in 2015 led the band to release another EP, Live at Ardent Studios, that year. They have played at many music festivals across the United States, including Hangout Music Festival and South by Southwest. On April 21, 2017, they released their first full-length album, Sun Kids. Their stage production is inspired by Of Montreal, Man or Astro Man, Octopus Project, and especially the Protomen, about whom Ingalls said: "I was just enamored with the idea that you could sneak into a dive bar and have this grimy place be transformed: just because folks took the time to make costumes, coordinate visuals, and get their goofy friends to hop on stage and play along. We want people to leave feeling as happy and joyous as we get to feel playing for them."
