= The Great Gig in the Sky =

Song by Pink Floyd

from the album The Dark Side of the Moon
- Released: 1 March 1973
- Recorded: 20 June 1972 – 9 February 1973
- Studio: Abbey Road Studios (London, England)
- Genre: Progressive rock; psychedelic rock; gospel
- Length: 4:44
- Label: Harvest
- Composers: Richard Wright; Clare Torry
- Producer: Pink Floyd

Audio sample
- file; help

"The Great Gig in the Sky" is the fifth track (Note: It is the fourth track on CD pressings that merge "Speak to Me" and "Breathe".) on The Dark Side of the Moon, a 1973 album by English rock band Pink Floyd. The song features music by keyboard player Richard Wright and improvised, wordless vocals by session singer Clare Torry. It is one of only three Pink Floyd songs to feature lead vocals from an outside artist. (Note: The other two songs are "Have a Cigar" and "Hey, Hey, Rise Up!".)

"The Great Gig in the Sky" was released as a digital single on February 10, 2023, to promote The Dark Side of the Moon 50th Anniversary box set.

== Writing ==
The song began as a chord progression created by keyboard player Richard Wright, which was known in its early stages as "The Mortality Sequence" or "The Religion Song". During the first half of 1972, it was performed live as a simple organ instrumental, accompanied by spoken-word extracts from the Bible and snippets of speeches by Malcolm Muggeridge, a British writer known for his conservative religious views.

By September 1972, the lead instrument had been switched to a piano, with an arrangement very similar to the final form but without vocals, and with a slightly different chord sequence in the middle. Various sound effects were tried over the track, including recordings of NASA astronauts communicating on space missions, but none were satisfactory.

On Classic Albums: Pink Floyd – The Making of The Dark Side of the Moon, it is stated that during the recording of the album, in which death and life had been a consistent theme, the members of the band went around asking questions and recording responses from people working inside Abbey Road at the time. Among the questions, they were asked "Are you afraid of dying?" The responses of doorman Gerry O'Driscoll and the wife of their road manager Peter Watts were used, as well as other spoken parts throughout the album ("I've always been mad", "That geezer was cruisin' for a bruisin").

(At 0:38)

I am not frightened of dying. Any time will do, I don't mind. Why should I be frightened of dying? There's no reason for it – you've got to go sometime.

— Gerry O'Driscoll, Abbey Road Studios doorman

(At 3:26, faintly)

I never said I was frightened of dying.

— Patricia 'Puddie' Watts, wife of road manager Peter Watts

== Recording ==
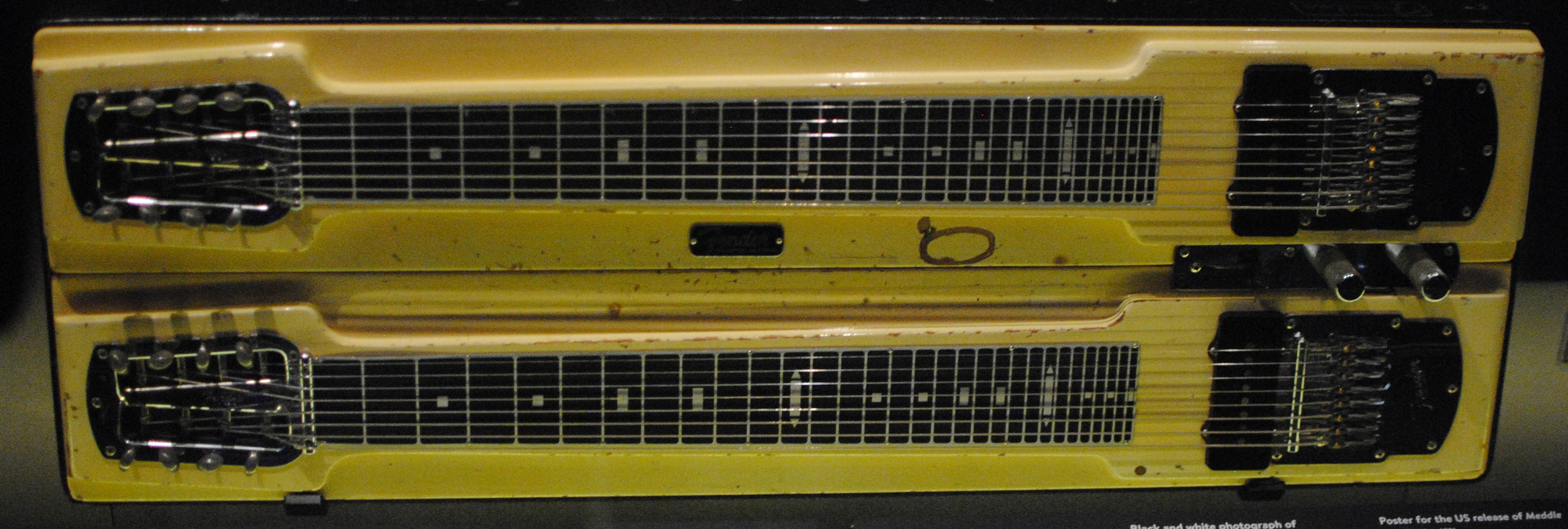
Fender 'Duo 1000' double-neck steel guitar (1962), purchased in Seattle in October 1970 by David Gilmour, and used on 'Great Gig in the Sky'; displayed at the Pink Floyd: Their Mortal Remains exhibition

In January 1973, a couple of weeks before the album was due to be finished, the band thought of asking a female singer to "wail" over the music. The band began casting around for a singer, and studio engineer Alan Parsons suggested Clare Torry, a 25-year-old songwriter and session vocalist he had worked with on a Top of the Pops covers album. Torry was contacted to arrange a session for the same evening but she had other commitments, including tickets to see Chuck Berry, so a three-hour session was scheduled for the next day, Sunday 21 January.

The band played the instrumental track to Torry and asked her to improvise a vocal. At first, she struggled to find what was needed, but then she was inspired to sing as if she were an instrument herself. Torry performed two complete takes, the second more emotional than the first, but when David Gilmour asked for a third take she stopped halfway through, feeling that she was becoming repetitive and had already done the best she could. The final album track was assembled from all three takes. The members of the band were deeply impressed by Torry's performance but did not tell her this, and she left the studio, with a standard £30 flat fee, under the impression that her vocals would not make the final cut. She only became aware that she had been included in the final mix when she picked up the album at a local record store and saw her name in the credits. In 2005, an undisclosed out-of-court settlement in Torry's favour included giving her vocal composition credit.

Chris Thomas, who was brought in to assist Alan Parsons in mixing the album, mentions that they were actually in mixdown at the time. On the DVD Classic Albums: Pink Floyd – The Making of The Dark Side of the Moon, various members mention that they had this song and were not sure what to do with it. Wright recalls that when Torry finished, she was apologetic about her performance, even though those present were amazed at her vocal improvisation.

In 2004, Clare Torry sued Pink Floyd and EMI for songwriting royalties, on the basis that her contribution to "The Great Gig in the Sky" constituted co-authorship with Richard Wright. In 1973, as a session singer, she was paid only the standard Sunday flat studio rate of £30 (equivalent to £355 in 2025). She told Mojo in 1998, "If I'd known then what I know now, I would have done something about organising copyright or publishing." In 2005, prior to a hearing in the High Court, an out-of-court settlement was reached, although the terms of the settlement were not disclosed. On all pressings after 2005, the composition is credited to both Richard Wright and Clare Torry.

== Live performances ==
=== Pink Floyd ===
An early incarnation of the song, titled "The Mortality Sequence" and lacking the vocals later contributed by Clare Torry, was performed by Pink Floyd during the 1972 shows of their Dark Side of the Moon Tour. In its final version, "The Great Gig in the Sky" was performed live by Pink Floyd from 1973 to 1975, and from 1988 to 1994.

During the band's 1974 tours as well as the Wish You Were Here Tour, David Gilmour played both pedal steel guitar and the Hammond organ, allowing Richard Wright to concentrate solely on piano (his keyboards were positioned where he could not play both). Gilmour's pedal steel for "Great Gig" was accordingly located beside Wright's Hammond. Vocal duties were handled by Venetta Fields and Carlena Williams, both former members of the Blackberries. The 16 November 1974 performance can be found in the Experience 2-CD and Immersion box set editions of The Dark Side of the Moon.

Although the studio version of "The Great Gig in the Sky" does not continue directly into "Money" because of the former marking the end of side 1 of the LP, all of the 1970s live versions of this song (including the 1972 work in progress ones) continue into the extended SFX intro of "Money". However, during the full live recreations of Dark Side of the Moon in 1994, "The Great Gig In The Sky" and "Money" were separated from each other as per the studio versions.

Starting with the 1988 leg of the A Momentary Lapse of Reason Tour, additional touring keyboardist Jon Carin took over the Hammond parts. Up to three singers performed the vocals, each taking different parts of the song. On the Delicate Sound of Thunder video, with footage from June and August 1988, the vocals are shared by Rachel Fury, Durga McBroom and Margret Taylor. Clare Torry performed the song in the Knebworth concert, released in 2021 live album Live at Knebworth 1990.

The Division Bell Tour of 1994 featured a version sung by Sam Brown, Durga McBroom and Claudia Fontaine. A recording from the London concerts can be found in the live album Pulse (1995). When Pink Floyd's manager, Steve O'Rourke, died in 2003, Gilmour, Wright, and Mason played "Fat Old Sun" and "The Great Gig in the Sky" at his funeral. McBroom said Richard Wright liked her version best, and as he had requested, she sang it at Wright's funeral.

=== Roger Waters ===
Torry joined Roger Waters to perform the song live during three dates of his K.A.O.S. On the Road concert series in 1987. In the 1999 leg of Waters' In the Flesh tour, only the piano intro was played between the reprise of "Breathe" and "Money".

In the 2006–08 The Dark Side of the Moon Live tour, the album was played in its entirety, with the song being performed by Carol Kenyon. "The Great Gig in the Sky" made a return in his Us + Them Tour (2017–18), performed by lead vocalists of American band Lucius Jess Wolfe and Holly Laessig. The performance was documented in the concert film and live album Roger Waters: Us + Them (2019).

=== David Gilmour ===
The song was occasionally performed in the final legs of his Rattle That Lock Tour, most notably in the Amphitheatre of Pompeii on 7 and 8 July 2016, with Lucita Jules, Louise Clare Marshall and Bryan Chambers sharing the vocals. The Pompeii performance is part of Gilmour's Live at Pompeii live album and film. The song was also performed during his “Luck and Strange” tour in 2024.

== Reception and legacy ==
In a 1973 review of The Dark Side of the Moon, Loyd Grossman of Rolling Stone described "The Great Gig in the Sky" as a track [Pink Floyd] could have "shortened or dispensed with". Craig Jenkins at Vulture wrote, "Torry’s performance manages to express the full range of human emotion without relying on words." He also believed that the song was "pea soup without her". Fraser Lewry of Louder said her vocals "lifted the song to celestial heights" and quipped that her hiring was "the best £30 Pink Floyd ever spent". A readers' poll from Rolling Stone ranked the track second on their list of the greatest vocal performances of all time behind "Bohemian Rhapsody".

A short clip of the song was used in a 1974 US TV advertisement for Dole bananas. A re-recorded version was used as the backing music in a UK television advertisement for the analgesic Nurofen in 1990. The band was not involved in this version, but Clare Torry again did the vocal with Rick Wright on keyboards, Neil Conti on drums and Lati Kronlund on bass. Gilmour said he did not approve of its use, but that Wright, as the writer, had the rights.

== Personnel ==
Pink Floyd

- David Gilmour – lap steel guitar
- Richard Wright – piano, Hammond organ, writing
- Roger Waters – bass
- Nick Mason – drums

Additional personnel

- Clare Torry – vocals, writing (originally uncredited)

== Charts ==
=== Weekly charts ===
Weekly chart performance for "The Great Gig in the Sky"
Chart (2023)	Peak position
UK Rock & Metal (Official Charts)	16

== Certifications ==
Region	Certification	Certified units/sales
Italy (FIMI) sales since 2009	Gold	25,000^{‡}
New Zealand (RMNZ)	Platinum	30,000^{‡}
United Kingdom (BPI) sales since 2005	Gold	400,000^{‡}
^{‡} Sales+streaming figures based on certification alone.
