= Eclipse (Pink Floyd song) =

Song by Pink Floyd

from the album The Dark Side of the Moon
- Released: 1 March 1973
- Recorded: 3 June 1972 – 1 February 1973
- Genre: Progressive rock
- Length: 2:10; 2:06 (2023 remaster)
- Label: Harvest
- Songwriter: Roger Waters
- Producer: Pink Floyd

Audio sample
- Penultimate section before the heartbeats: file; help

"Eclipse" is the tenth (Note: Some CD pressings merge "Speak to Me" and "Breathe", resulting in "Eclipse" being the ninth track.) and final track from English rock band Pink Floyd's 1973 album, The Dark Side of the Moon. It was written and sung by Roger Waters, with harmonies by David Gilmour and Rick Wright. After Waters left the band, Gilmour sang the lead vocal when performing live.

On the album, the song transitions, without noticeable break, from the previous song, "Brain Damage", and the two are often played together as a single track on the radio (some DJs call the combined track "The Dark Side of the Moon"). The end of the track consists of a fading heartbeat, identical to the opening of the first track on the album, "Speak to Me".

== Composition ==
This song serves as the album's end and features a loud, repetitive melody that builds up, then ends with a very quiet outro. When the main instrumentation ends at 1:30, the sound of a heartbeat from the first track, "Speak to Me", appears, which appears again in 9/8, and gradually fades to silence.

Harmonically, the song consists of a repeating 4-bar chord progression: D, D/C, B♭maj7, and A7sus4 resolving to A7. The bass line is a descending tetrachord.

David Gilmour recorded two tracks of rhythm guitar, playing arpeggios, one in open position, and one much higher, around the tenth fret. The lower-pitched guitar part includes the open G and E strings during the B♭maj7, resulting in an added sixth and a dissonant augmented fourth. The quartet of backing singers vary their parts, rising in volume, and echoing some of Roger Waters' vocals, as the piece builds in intensity. On the last repetition of the chord progression, the B♭maj7 leads directly to a climax on D major, resulting in a "brightening" effect (known as the Picardy third), as the aforementioned implication of D minor in the B♭maj7 chord shifts to the major.

Waters wrote the lyrics on the road for the "Brain Damage" / "Eclipse" closing sequence as he felt the whole piece was "unfinished". The final words sung on the song and, indeed the album The Dark Side of the Moon, directs the listener, "and everything under the sun is in tune, but the sun is eclipsed by the moon." Waters explained the meaning of these words as well as the entire song by asserting:

I don't see it as a riddle. The album uses the sun and the moon as symbols; the light and the dark; the good and the bad; the life force as opposed to the death force. I think it's a very simple statement saying that all the good things life can offer are there for us to grasp, but that the influence of some dark force in our natures prevents us from seizing them. The song addresses the listener and says that if you, the listener, are affected by that force, and if that force is a worry to you, well I feel exactly the same too. The line 'I'll see you on the dark side of the moon' is me speaking to the listener, saying, 'I know you have these bad feelings and impulses because I do too, and one of the ways I can make direct contact with you is to share with you the fact that I feel bad sometimes.

The doorman of Abbey Road Studios, Gerry O'Driscoll, is heard speaking at 1:37, answering the question: "What is 'the dark side of the moon'?" with: "There is no dark side in the moon, really. Matter of fact, it's all dark. The only thing that makes it look light is the sun."

A section of an orchestral version of the Beatles song "Ticket to Ride" which was covered by Hollyridge Strings can be heard faintly at the very end of the recording. That was unintended: the music was playing in the background at Abbey Road when Gerry O'Driscoll was being recorded. This is not included on the 1983 Japanese Black Triangle CD issue of the album; the sound technicians copied one of the heartbeat samples, removed the orchestral "Ticket to Ride", repeatedly pasted the sample in and faded out the new outro.

== Usage ==
On 10 March 2004, the song was used to wake the Mars probe Opportunity. It was chosen in recognition of the transit of the Martian moon Phobos. This is not the first time Pink Floyd has been played in outer space; Soviet cosmonauts took and played an advance copy of Delicate Sound of Thunder aboard Soyuz TM-7, making it the first album played in space.

At the opening ceremonies of the 2012 London Olympics, the song was played following the lighting of the torch and accompanied by a huge fireworks display and a photo montage of (mainly) British Olympians.

This song was considered, but ultimately rejected, for inclusion on Echoes: The Best of Pink Floyd.

A remixed version by film composer Hans Zimmer was featured in the first trailer for Dune, released on September 9, 2020.

During the solar eclipse of August 12 2026, Spotify noted a 144 per cent increase in streaming of the song worldwide.

== Personnel ==
- Roger Waters – bass guitar, lead vocals
- David Gilmour – electric guitars, backing vocals
- Richard Wright – Hammond organ, backing vocals
- Nick Mason – drums, bass drums, tape effects

with:

- Lesley Duncan – backing vocals
- Doris Troy – backing vocals
- Barry St. John – backing vocals
- Liza Strike – backing vocals

== Certifications ==
Region	Certification	Certified units/sales
New Zealand (RMNZ)	Gold	15,000^{‡}
^{‡} Sales+streaming figures based on certification alone.
