= Us and Them (song) =

- US 7-inch single

Single by Pink Floyd

from the album The Dark Side of the Moon
- B-side: "Time"
- Released: 4 February 1974
- Recorded: 1 June 1972 – 9 January 1973
- Studio: EMI, London
- Genre: Progressive rock; jazz fusion
- Length: 3:15 (single edit); 7:49 (album version); 7:51 (Echoes version)
- Label: Harvest
- Composer: Richard Wright
- Lyricist: Roger Waters
- Producer: Pink Floyd

Pink Floyd singles chronology
"Money" (1973)	"Us and Them" (1974)	"Have a Cigar" (1975)

Audio sample
- First chorus: file; help

"Us and Them" is a song by the English rock band Pink Floyd, from their 1973 album The Dark Side of the Moon. The music was written by Richard Wright with lyrics by Roger Waters. It is sung by David Gilmour with harmonies by Wright. The song is 7 minutes and 49 seconds, making it the longest track on the album. It is also the first track that was recorded for the album.

"Us and Them" was released as the second single from The Dark Side of the Moon in the United States, peaking at No. 72 on the Cash Box Top 100 Singles chart in March 1974. The single peaked at No. 85 in the Canadian chart.

== Composition ==
Richard Wright introduces the song with harmonies on Hammond organ and put a piano chordal backing and short piano solo afterwards on the arrangement. The tune was originally written on the piano by Wright for the film Zabriskie Point in 1969 and was titled "The Violent Sequence". In its original demo form the song was instrumental, featuring only piano and bass. Director Michelangelo Antonioni rejected it on the grounds that it was too unlike material such as "Careful with That Axe, Eugene", which was the style of music he wanted to use. As Roger Waters recalls it in impersonation, Antonioni's response was: "It's beautiful but is a too sad, you know? It makes me think of church". The song was then shelved until the making of The Dark Side of the Moon.

The lyrics of the song were written by Waters. They describe the senseless nature of war and the ignorance of modern-day humans who have been taken over by consumerism and materialism. In an interview, Waters shared the significance of each verse:

The first verse is about going to war, how on the front line we don't get much chance to communicate with one another because someone else has decided that we shouldn't. The second verse is about civil liberties, racism and colour prejudice. The last verse is about passing a tramp in the street and not helping.

The verses have a unique, jazz-influenced chord progression: Dsus2, D6add9 (or Esus2/D), D minor major 7, and G/D. The tonic of D, alternating with the dominant, A, is sustained on bass guitar as a pedal point throughout the verses. The D6 with an added 9th is not unlike an Esus2 with a D in the bass but because the bass line also provides the fifth, it is more accurately described as a kind of D chord. The D minor chord with a major seventh is a rarity in 1970s rock music. There is also a secondary sequence, louder with thick vocal harmonies, with a progression of B minor, A major, G major seventh suspended second, commonly written as "Gmaj7sus2" (enharmonic to the slash chord D/G), and C major. This progression is played twice between each verse and is not unlike a chorus, except that the lyrics are different with each repeat.

In the middle, there is a break during which roadie Roger "The Hat" Manifold speaks.

It was re-released on the 2001 best of album, Echoes: The Best of Pink Floyd, where it's the seventh track of the second disc. The ending of the song was edited in this version with the vocals from the last bar treated with heavy delay and the music track muted entirely to avoid the seamless transition to "Any Colour You Like" that occurs on The Dark Side of the Moon.

== Spoken parts ==
The following dialogue by the band's roadie, Roger "The Hat" Manifold, one of his two spoken segments on the album, is heard before the second saxophone solo (5:04), describing an altercation he had with a driver a few days prior:

I mean, he's gonna kill ya, so like, if you give 'em a quick sh ... short, sharp shock, they won't do it again. Dig it? I mean 'e got off light, 'cause I coulda given 'im a thrashin' but I only do it once. It's only a difference of right and wrong, innit? I mean, good manners don't cost nothin', do they, eh?

== Reception ==
Cash Box called it a "hypnotizing ballad" that is "as pretty as it is commercial." Record World called it an "ethereal number." Billboard and Louder Sound ranked the song number three and number eight, respectively, on their lists of the 50 greatest Pink Floyd songs.

=== Certifications ===
Region	Certification	Certified units/sales
New Zealand (RMNZ)	Platinum	30,000^{‡}
United Kingdom (BPI)	Silver	200,000^{‡}
^{‡} Sales+streaming figures based on certification alone.

== Alternative and live versions ==
- The original demo from the Zabriskie Point sessions was released on The Dark Side of the Moon Immersion Box Set in 2011.
- The instrumental "Violent Sequence" was performed on a handful of occasions in early 1970. These performances were much the same as the Zabriskie Point demo, with some added percussion from Nick Mason. On at least two occasions, the song was paired with another piece from the Zabriskie sessions, "Heart Beat, Pig Meat".
- In early 1972 performances, a short audio clip of a man groaning in torturous pain would be played at the beginning of the song, immediately highlighting the song's theme of violence. The song did not include any saxophone and the lead vocals were performed by Waters and Wright, with David Gilmour providing backing vocals.
- It was occasionally featured as an encore during the band's 1977 In the Flesh Tour (this was performed at most shows on the band's 1977 US tours during the encore). It was often used to intentionally calm the often rowdy stadium audiences.
- P·U·L·S·E and the second disc and video of Delicate Sound of Thunder feature this track. Both versions are shorter than the original studio recording, and the latter features a slightly altered saxophone solo. The Delicate Sound of Thunder recording ends on a major key before being interrupted by the sound effects from "Money", effectively reversing the original sequence. This same order of events was also used on 1994 nights that did not include the entire Dark Side of the Moon in sequence.
- On Echoes: The Best of Pink Floyd, the song has a different ending: instead of segueing into what would be the next track on The Dark Side of the Moon ("Any Colour You Like"), engineer and Floyd collaborator James Guthrie gave the song a cold ending, before adding a backwards piano note that would lead into the collection's next track, "Learning to Fly".
- Waters included the song in his 2006–08 The Dark Side of the Moon Live tour, with Jon Carin replacing Gilmour on lead vocals, and Waters replacing Wright on harmony vocals.
- Waters performed the song during his set during the live TV benefit concert 12-12-12: The Concert for Sandy Relief (2012). This version ends with a full stop but while Pink Floyd closed it on a D major, Waters instead opted for a B minor chord.
- Gilmour played the song on his Rattle That Lock Tour 2015–16, with an ending similar to that of the 1988–1989 tour.
- Waters performed the song during his 2017-2018 concert tour, released as the concert film Us + Them (2019). The ending (cold ending with decaying vocal echo) is closer to the version of the Echoes compilation.

== Personnel ==
- David Gilmour – lead vocals, electric guitars
- Richard Wright – Hammond organ, piano, harmony vocals (choruses)
- Roger Waters – bass guitar
- Nick Mason – drums

Additional personnel

- Dick Parry – tenor saxophone
- Lesley Duncan – backing vocals
- Doris Troy – backing vocals
- Barry St. John – backing vocals
- Liza Strike – backing vocals

== See also ==
- List of anti-war songs
