= David Gilmour discography =

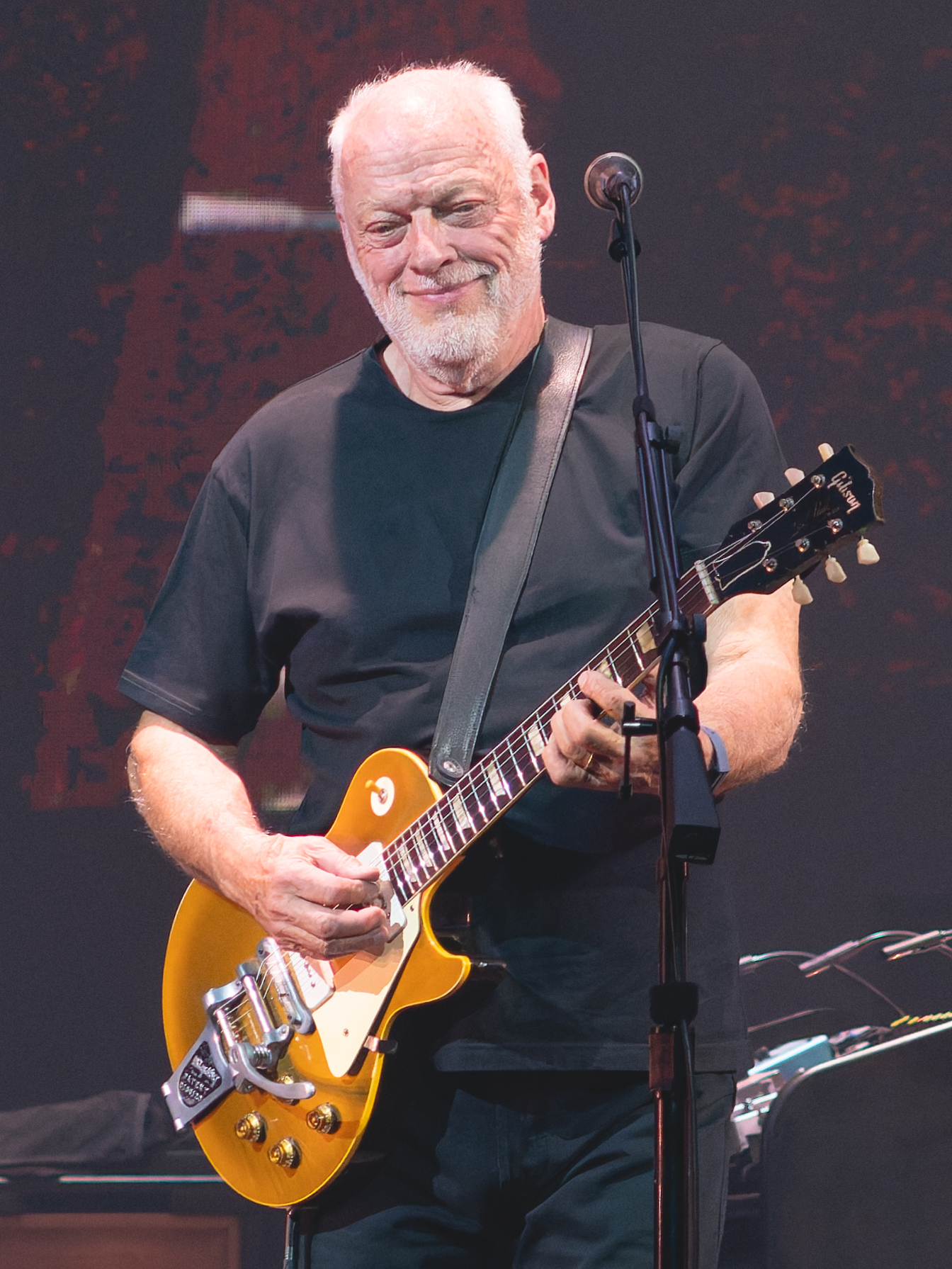
- Gilmour at the Royal Albert Hall in 2024
- Studio albums: 5
- Soundtrack albums: 1
- Live albums: 3
- Singles: 18
- Video albums: 6
- Music videos: 19
- Collaborative albums: 1

The discography of the English guitarist, singer and songwriter David Gilmour, consists of five studio albums, three live albums and 18 singles.

== Albums ==
=== Studio albums ===
Title	Album details	Peak chart positions													Sales	Certifications
Title	Album details	UK	AUS	BEL	CAN	FRA	GER	ITA	NLD	NOR	NZ	SWE	SWI	US	Sales	Certifications
David Gilmour	Released: 26 May 1978 (UK); Label: Harvest (UK), Columbia (US); Formats: CD, CS, LP, DL	17	14	—	—	—	17	80	—	—	22	21	—	29		RIAA: Gold
About Face	Released: 5 March 1984 (UK); Label: Harvest (UK), Columbia (US); Formats: CD, CS, LP, Q8, DL	21	36	—	—	—	24	81	—	10	24	13	15	32		RIAA: Gold
On an Island	Released: 6 March 2006; Label: EMI (UK), Columbia Records (US); Formats: CD, CD+DVD, LP, DL	1	23	3	2	14	3	1	3	1	2	3	4	6	US: 96,000	BPI: Platinum; BVMI: Gold; MC: Gold
Rattle That Lock	Released: 18 September 2015; Label: Columbia; Formats: CD, LP, DVD, DL	1	2	1	2	1	2	1	2	1	1	1	2	5	US: 70,000	BPI: Gold; BVMI: Gold; FIMI: Platinum
Luck and Strange	Released: 6 September 2024; Label: Sony Music; Formats: CD, BR, LP, DL	1	6	2	14	2	1	2	1	5	10	8	1	10		BPI: Silver
"—" denotes album that did not chart or was not released

=== Live albums ===
Title	Album details	Peak chart positions													Sales	Certifications
Title	Album details	UK	AUS	BEL	CAN	FRA	GER	ITA	NLD	NOR	NZ	SWE	SWI	US	Sales	Certifications
Live in Gdańsk	Released: 22 September 2008; Label: EMI (UK), Columbia Records (US); Formats: CD, CD+DVD, LP, DL	10	30	5	19	15	12	7	14	34	20	24	14	26	US: 19,000	BPI: Gold
Live at Pompeii	Released: 29 September 2017; Label: Columbia Records; Formats: CD, CD+DVD, LP, DL	3	50	6	19	15	2	1	2	4	31	12	4	45		FIMI: Gold
The Luck and Strange Concerts	Released: 17 October 2025; Label: Sony Music; Formats: CD, CD+DVD, LP, DL	12	55	5	—	17	—	4	8	65	—	49	—	—		

== Singles ==
Title	Year	Peak chart positions							Album
Title	Year	UK	BEL	DEN	FRA	ITA	SPA	US	Album
"There's No Way Out of Here"	1978	—	—	—	—	—	—	—	David Gilmour
"Blue Light"	1984	—	—	—	—	—	—	62	About Face
"Love on the Air"	1984	—	—	—	—	—	—	—	About Face
"On an Island"	2006	72	—	—	—	—	—	—	On an Island
"Smile"	2006	72	—	—	—	—	—	—	On an Island
"Arnold Layne" (live)	2006	19	—	7	—	2	12	—	non-album
"Rattle That Lock"	2015	—	66	—	71	—	—	—	Rattle That Lock
"Today"	2015	—	87	—	—	—	—	—	Rattle That Lock
"Rattle That Lock" (live)	2017	—	—	—	—	—	—	—	Live at Pompeii
"One of These Days" (live)	2017	—	—	—	—	—	—	—	Live at Pompeii
"Run Like Hell" (live)	2017	—	—	—	—	—	—	—	Live at Pompeii
"Yes, I Have Ghosts" (with Romany Gilmour)	2020	—	—	—	—	—	—	—	non-album
"Yes, I Have Ghosts"/"Tell the Truth"/"Astral Dust"/"Kokineli"	2021	—	—	—	—	—	—	—	non-album
"The Piper's Call"	2024	— (Note: "The Piper's Call" did not enter the UK Singles Chart, but debuted and peaked at number 87 on the UK Singles Downloads Chart Top 100.)	—	—	—	—	—	—	Luck and Strange
"Between Two Points" (with Romany Gilmour)	2024	—	—	—	—	—	—	—	Luck and Strange
"Dark and Velvet Nights"	2024	—	—	—	—	—	—	—	Luck and Strange
"Luck and Strange"	2024	—	—	—	—	—	—	—	Luck and Strange
"Sorrow" (live)	2025	—	—	—	—	—	—	—	The Luck and Strange Concerts
"—" denotes album that did not chart or was not released

== Other appearances ==
=== Collaborations ===
Year	Artist	Album / Work	Ref
2009	Bob Geldof, Chrissie Hynde and David Gilmour	Vocals and guitar on "Chicago/Change the World" for the "Keep Gary McKinnon Free" campaign	

=== Benefit groups ===
Year	Artist	Release
1989	Rock Aid Armenia	"What's Going On"
1990	Rock Aid Armenia	"Smoke on the Water" from The Earthquake Album
2005	Various Artists	"Ever Fallen in Love (With Someone You Shouldn't've)"

== Session and production work ==
Year	Artist	Album / Work	Ref
1970	Syd Barrett	The Madcap Laughs	
1970	Syd Barrett	Barrett	
1970	Ron Geesin and Roger Waters	"Give Birth to a Smile" on Music from the Body	
1974	Unicorn	Blue Pine Trees (producer)	
1975	Roy Harper	"The Game" from HQ	
1975	Sutherland and Quiver	"Ain't Too Proud" from Reach for the Sky	
1976	Unicorn	Too Many Crooks (US title Unicorn 2, features the song "There's No Way Out of Here") (producer)	
1978	Kate Bush	Executive producer for "The Saxophone Song" and "The Man with the Child in His Eyes" from The Kick Inside	
1978	Unicorn	One More Tomorrow (Harvest Records) (producer, shared with Muff Winwood)	
1979	Wings	Guitar on "Rockestra Theme" and "So Glad to See You Here" from Back to the Egg	
1980	Roy Harper	"Playing Games", "You (The Game Part II)", "Old Faces", "Short and Sweet" and "True Story" on The Unknown Soldier, credited to Harper/Gilmour.	
1982	Kate Bush	Background vocals on "Pull Out the Pin" from The Dreaming	
1983	Atomic Rooster	Headline News	
1984	Paul McCartney	"No More Lonely Nights" in Give My Regards to Broad Street	
1985	Supertramp	"Brother Where You Bound"	
1985	Bryan Ferry	"Is Your Love Strong Enough?" in Legend	
1985	Bryan Ferry	Boys and Girls	
1985	Bryan Ferry	Live Aid (played with Bryan Ferry's band)	
1985	Nick Mason and Rick Fenn	"Lie for a Lie" (vocals) in Profiles	
1985	Pete Townshend	"Give Blood" and "White City Fighting" in White City: A Novel – "White City Fighting" credited to Townshend/Gilmour. Also performed live as Deep End.	
1985	Arcadia	So Red the Rose	
1985	The Dream Academy	Co-produced The Dream Academy	
1985	Roy Harper and Jimmy Page	"Hope" on Whatever Happened to Jugula?, credited to Harper/Gilmour.	
1986	Berlin	Count Three & Pray	
1986	Liona Boyd	Electric guitar on "L'Enfant", "Sorceress" and "Persona" from Persona	
1986	Pete Townshend	Lead guitar in Pete Townshend's Deep End Live!	
1987	Dalbello	"Immaculate Eyes" in she	
1987	Bryan Ferry	Bête Noire	
1988	Peter Cetera	"You Never Listen To Me" in One More Story	
1988	Sam Brown	Guitar on "This Feeling" and "I'll Be in Love" in Stop!	
1989	Kate Bush	Guitar on "Love and Anger" and "Rocket's Tail" from The Sensual World	
1989	Paul McCartney	"We Got Married" in Flowers in the Dirt	
1989	Warren Zevon	Transverse City	
1990	Roy Harper	"Once" in Once (w/ Kate Bush on backing vocals)	
1990	Propaganda	"Only One Word" in 1234	
1990	Sam Brown	April Moon, vocals on "Troubled Soul"	
1990	Michael Kamen and David Sanborn	Concerto for Saxophone, guitar on "Sasha"	
1990	Blue Pearl	Naked, guitar on Running Up That Hill and Alive (with Rick Wright on keyboards)	
1990	Roé	Roé, guitar "Como el agua"	
1991	All About Eve	"Are You Lonely" and "Wishing the Hours Away" in Touched by Jesus	
1991	Hale and Pace	Lead guitar on "The Stonk"	
1992	Elton John	"Understanding Women", in The One	
1993	Paul Rodgers	"Standing Around Crying" in Muddy Water Blues: A Tribute to Muddy Waters	
1994	Snowy White	"Love, Pain and Sorrow" on Highway To The Sun	
1994	Chris Jagger	"Steal the Time" on Chris Jagger's Atcha	
1995	Guy Pratt	"Grand Central Station" from the soundtrack to Hackers; according to Pratt on Twitter, features uncredited guitar performance by Gilmour	
1996	The Who	Quadrophenia (1996 Hyde Park concert)	
1997	B. B. King	"Cryin' Won't Help You Babe" in Deuces Wild	
1999	Paul McCartney	Run Devil Run	
1999	Pretty Things	Several songs on Resurrection	
2001	Triumph of Love soundtrack	Plays guitar over several chamber orchestra pieces	
2001	Mica Paris	"I Put a Spell on You" on Later... with Jools Holland	
2003	Ringo Starr	Guitar solo on "Missouri Loves Company" & "I Think, Therefore I Rock n' Roll" in Ringo Rama	
2004	Alan Parsons and Simon Posford	"Return to Tunguska" in A Valid Path	
2004	Phil Manzanera	"Always You" and "Sacred Days" on 6PM	
2006	Chris Jagger	"It's Amazing (What People Throw Away)" and "Junkman", in Act of Faith	
2009	Nick Laird-Clowes	"Mayday", from the A Time Comes documentary (Free download from nicklairdclowes.com)	
2009	Rod Stewart	In a Broken Dream from The Rod Stewart Sessions 1971-1998 (track recorded 1992)	
2010	The Orb	Writing and guitar on album Metallic Spheres	
2010	Bryan Ferry	"Me Oh My" and "Song to the Siren" from Olympia	
2014	Ben Watt	Slide guitar and backing vocals on "The Levels" from Hendra	
2022	Donovan	Electric guitar on "Rock Me" from Gaelia	
2024	Michael Berkeley	"Zero Hour", from Collaborations	
2024	Body Count	Electric guitar on "Comfortably Numb"	

== Unreleased soundtracks ==
- Fractals: The Colours of Infinity, Documentary (1994)

== Videography ==
=== Video albums ===
Title	Video details	Peak chart positions									Certifications
Title	Video details	AUS	BEL	FIN	GER	JPN	NLD	SWE	UK	US	Certifications
David Gilmour Live 1984	Released: September 1984; Label: CBS FOX Video Music; Formats: VHS, DVD	—	—	—	—	—	—	—	—	—	
David Gilmour in Concert	Released: October 2002; Label: EMI (UK), Capitol Records (US); Formats: DVD	23	—	—	—	—	—	5	2	6	GER: Gold; POL: Gold
Remember That Night	Released: 17 September 2007; Label: David Gilmour Music Ltd.; Formats: DVD, Blu-ray	2	1	4	9	46	2	1	1	17	CAN: 2× Platinum; US: Platinum; GER: Gold
Live in Gdańsk	Released: 22 September 2008; Label: EMI (UK), Columbia Records (US); Formats: DVD	—	—	—	—	—	—	—	—	—	
Live at Pompeii	Released: 29 September 2017; Label: Columbia Records; Formats: DVD, Blu-ray	—	—	—	—	—	—	—	1	—	AUS: Gold
Live at the Circus Maximus	Released: 17 October 2025; Label: Sony Music; Formats: DVD, Blu-ray	—	—	—	—	—	—	—	1	—	
"—" denotes album that did not chart or was not released

=== Music videos ===
Year	Title	Album
1978	"There's No Way Out of Here"	David Gilmour
1978	"So Far Away"	David Gilmour
1978	"No Way"	David Gilmour
1978	"I Can't Breathe Anymore"	David Gilmour
1978	"Mihalis"	David Gilmour
1984	"Blue Light"	About Face
1984	"All Lovers Are Deranged"	About Face
2006	"On an Island"	On an Island
2006	"Smile"	On an Island
2015	"Rattle That Lock"	Rattle That Lock
2015	"Today"	Rattle That Lock
2015	"The Girl in the Yellow Dress"	Rattle That Lock
2015	"Faces of Stone"	Rattle That Lock
2016	"In Any Tongue"	Rattle That Lock
2020	"Yes, I Have Ghosts" (with Romany Gilmour)	non-album
2024	"The Piper's Call"	Luck and Strange
2024	"Between Two Points" (with Romany Gilmour)	Luck and Strange
2024	"Dark and Velvet Nights"	Luck and Strange
2024	"Luck and Strange"	Luck and Strange
