= On an Island Tour =

2006 concert tour by David Gilmour

- Tour by David Gilmour
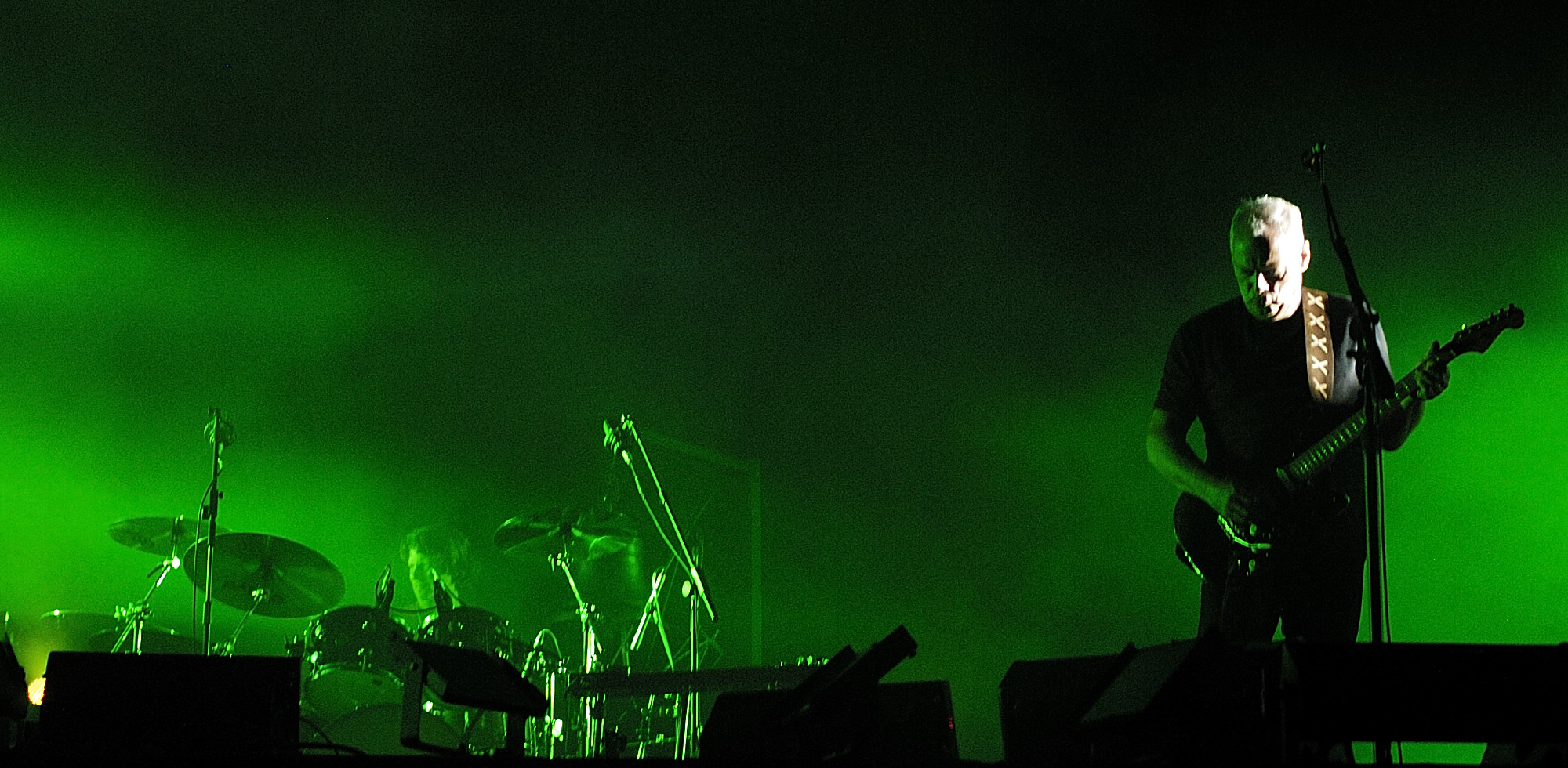
- David Gilmour on stage, Munich, 2006
- Location: Europe; North America
- Associated album: On an Island
- Start date: 7 March 2006
- End date: 26 August 2006
- Legs: 3
- No. of shows: 33

David Gilmour concert chronology
- About Face Tour (1984); On an Island Tour (2006); Rattle That Lock Tour (2015–2016)

On an Island was a concert tour by musician David Gilmour to promote his third studio album, On an Island (2006).

== Background ==
Richard Wright, Phil Manzanera and Guy Pratt joined Gilmour on tour to promote the album. The tour also featured Dick Parry, who played saxophone on the Pink Floyd albums The Dark Side of the Moon, Wish You Were Here and The Division Bell and Jon Carin who, in 1980s and 1990s, toured with Pink Floyd. Zbigniew Preisner conducted the orchestra in concert at Gdańsk. Pink Floyd drummer Nick Mason joined to play "Wish You Were Here" and "Comfortably Numb" at one of the London shows. David Bowie made a guest appearance in London, performing vocals on "Comfortably Numb" and "Arnold Layne", the latter subsequently released as a live single. David Crosby and Graham Nash also appeared on select dates, reprising their studio performance of "On an Island", as well as singing on three other songs.

The tour was documented by the release of a live DVD/Blu-ray, Remember That Night; recorded at the Royal Albert Hall in May 2006 and a live album, Live in Gdańsk; a recording of the final show of the tour at the Gdańsk Shipyard, Poland in August 2006.

== Set list ==
Set one:

1. "Speak to Me"/"Breathe"
2. "Time"/"Breathe (Reprise)"
  (At the beginning of the tour the above tracks were played during Set 2)
3. On an Island (entire album)
  (At the beginning of the tour the On an Island album made up the entire first set. The album was originally played in order, but half way through the US tour "Take a Breath" was moved so it was played after "Smile".)

All above tracks were present at every show.

Set two: The second set featured a selection of these tracks:

1. "Shine On You Crazy Diamond (Parts 1–2, 4–5)" (Always present in the set. Occasionally performed with David Crosby and Graham Nash. "Part 3" was omitted to make the song's intro more guitar focused.)
2. "Astronomy Domine" (Added during the second European tour, after the UK tour.)
3. "Wot's... Uh the Deal?"
4. "Wearing the Inside Out"
5. "Fat Old Sun"
6. "Dominoes"
7. "Arnold Layne" (was added at the end of the US leg with Richard Wright on lead vocals. A performance at the Royal Albert Hall on 29 May featured David Bowie on vocals)
8. "Coming Back to Life"
9. "High Hopes" (Always present in the set)
10. "The Great Gig in the Sky" (performed on 30th/31 May with Mica Paris and during the early European dates, but was dropped until the London dates.)
11. "Echoes" (Always present in the set, always the show-closer before the encore.)

Encore:

1. "Wish You Were Here" (Always present in the set. On 31 May Nick Mason played drums)
2. "Find the Cost of Freedom" (only performed with David Crosby and Graham Nash)
3. "Comfortably Numb" (Always the final song of the shows. On 29 May at the Royal Albert Hall David Bowie sang lead vocals on the verses. On 31 May Nick Mason played drums.)

Other songs: Special performances of the following songs:

1. "On the Turning Away" (Venice, Italy on 11/12 August)
- Unrehearsed, impromptu performance, played during the second set.
2. "Dark Globe" (Performed during July & August)
- Solo performances by Gilmour, performed after the death of Syd Barrett.
3. "A Great Day for Freedom" (Gdańsk, Poland on 26 August)
- One-off performance. The song is about the freedom brought to the Eastern Bloc with the fall of the Berlin Wall. It was this, in part, that the concert was celebrating.

== Personnel ==
Main band

- David Gilmour – lead guitar, rhythm guitar on "Dominoes", vocals, console steel guitar, acoustic lap steel guitar, cümbüş, alto saxophone on "Red Sky at Night"
- Richard Wright – piano, organ, synthesiser, vocals
- Phil Manzanera – rhythm guitar, additional lead guitar on "On an Island" and "Then I Close My Eyes", lead guitar on "Dominoes", vocals, glass harmonica on "Shine On" (Venice, 11 August and Gdańsk)
- Guy Pratt – bass guitar, double bass, vocals, guitar on "Then I Close My Eyes", glass harmonica on "Shine On" (Venice, 11 August and Gdańsk)
- Jon Carin – keyboards, synthesiser, vocals, lap steel guitar
- Dick Parry – tenor and baritone saxophones, glass harmonica on "Shine On" (Venice, 11 August and Gdańsk)
- Steve DiStanislao – drums, percussion, vocals

Special guests

- David Crosby – vocals on "On an Island", "The Blue", "Shine On You Crazy Diamond" and "Find the Cost of Freedom" (various dates)
- Graham Nash – vocals on "On an Island", "The Blue", "Shine On You Crazy Diamond" and "Find the Cost of Freedom" (various dates)
- Robert Wyatt – cornet on "Then I Close My Eyes" (Royal Albert Hall shows)
- David Bowie – vocals on "Arnold Layne" and "Comfortably Numb" (Royal Albert Hall, 29 May)
- Mica Paris – vocals on "The Great Gig in the Sky" (Royal Albert Hall 30 and 31 May)
- Nick Mason – drums on "Wish You Were Here" and "Comfortably Numb" (Royal Albert Hall, 31 May)
- Igor Sklyarov – glass harmonica on "Shine On You Crazy Diamond" (Venice, 12 August)
- Leszek Możdżer – piano (Gdańsk, 26 August 2006)
- Polish Baltic Philharmonic Orchestra conducted by Zbigniew Preisner (Gdańsk, 26 August)
- Sam Brown – vocals on "The Great Gig in the Sky" (Paris, 16 March)

== Tour dates ==
List of 2006 concerts
Date	City	Country	Venue	Note
7 March 2006	London	England	Mermaid Theatre	Filmed for BBC broadcast
10 March 2006	Dortmund	Germany	Konzerthaus	First live performance of "Wot's...Uh the Deal"; First of "Echoes" in 18 years; Featuring "Dominoes"
11 March 2006	Hamburg	Germany	Congress Centrum Hamburg	
15 March 2006	Paris	France	Le Grand Rex	
16 March 2006	Paris	France	L'Olympia	Featuring Sam Brown in a performance of "The Great Gig in the Sky"
18 March 2006	Frankfurt	Germany	Alte Oper	
19 March 2006	Amsterdam	Netherlands	Heineken Music Hall	
20 March 2006	Amsterdam	Netherlands	Heineken Music Hall	
24 March 2006	Milan	Italy	Teatro Arcimboldi	
25 March 2006	Milan	Italy	Teatro Arcimboldi	
26 March 2006	Rome	Italy	Auditorium Parco Della Musica	
4 April 2006	New York City	United States	Radio City Music Hall	First concert on tour to feature Crosby and Nash; First to feature "Find The Cost Of Freedom"
5 April 2006	New York City	United States	Radio City Music Hall	
9 April 2006	Toronto	Canada	Massey Hall	
10 April 2006	Toronto	Canada	Massey Hall	
12 April 2006	Chicago	United States	Rosemont Theatre	
13 April 2006	Chicago	United States	Rosemont Theatre	
16 April 2006	San Francisco	United States	Oakland Paramount Theatre	
17 April 2006	San Francisco	United States	Oakland Paramount Theatre	
19 April 2006	Los Angeles	United States	Kodak Theatre	
20 April 2006	Los Angeles	United States	Gibson Amphitheatre	
26 May 2006	Manchester	England	Bridgewater Hall	
27 May 2006	Glasgow	Scotland	Clyde Auditorium	
29 May 2006	London	England	Royal Albert Hall	Filmed performance; Featuring Robert Wyatt, David Bowie, David Crosby and Graham Nash
30 May 2006	London	England	Royal Albert Hall	Filmed performance; Featuring Mica Paris, Robert Wyatt, David Crosby and Graham Nash
31 May 2006	London	England	Royal Albert Hall	Filmed performance; Featuring Mica Paris, Nick Mason, Robert Wyatt, David Crosby and Graham Nash
27 July 2006	Klam	Austria	Klam Castle	Featuring the first performances of "Astronomy Domine" and "Dark Globe" on the tour
29 July 2006	Munich	Germany	Königsplatz	
31 July 2006	Vienne	France	Théâtre Antique	
2 August 2006	Florence	Italy	Piazza Santa Croce	
11 August 2006	Venice	Italy	Piazza San Marco	
12 August 2006	Venice	Italy	Piazza San Marco	Featuring an unrehearsed performance of "On The Turning Away"
26 August 2006	Gdańsk	Poland	Gdańsk Shipyard	Filmed performance; Featuring orchestra; Featuring "A Great Day for Freedom"
