= Live in Gdańsk =

Live album by David Gilmour
- Released: 22 September 2008
- Recorded: 26 August 2006
- Venues: Gdańsk Shipyard (Gdansk, Poland)
- Genre: Progressive rock
- Length: 148:58 (2-CD version); 460:58 (4-disc 2-CD/2-DVD version); 538:24 (5-disc 3-CD/2-DVD version); 138:47 (iTunes version)
- Labels: EMI (UK); Columbia Records (US)
- Director: Gavin Elder
- Producers: David Gilmour; Phil Manzanera

David Gilmour chronology
On an Island (2006)	Live in Gdańsk (2008)	Metallic Spheres (2010)

David Gilmour video chronology
Remember That Night (2007)	Live in Gdańsk (2008)	Live at Pompeii (2017)

Professional ratings
Review scores
Source	Rating
AllMusic	4/5 stars
BBC	(favourable)
Classic Rock	8/10 stars
ChartAttack	3/5 stars
The Guardian	3/5 stars
IGN	8.4/10

Live in Gdańsk is a live album by English musician David Gilmour. It is a part of his On an Island project which includes an album, tour, DVD, and live album. It was released on 22 September 2008. A David Gilmour Signature Series Fender Stratocaster was released at the same time.

== Recording ==
It is a recording of the final show of his On an Island Tour in 2006, where he played to an audience of 50,000 at the Gdańsk Shipyard to celebrate the founding of the Solidarity trade union. The show featured the song "A Great Day for Freedom", from the Pink Floyd album The Division Bell (1994) and was the only show of the tour to feature it. It was last performed by Gilmour during his semi-acoustic shows in 2002.

Gilmour played the entire On an Island album during this concert.

It's the final Pink Floyd-related recording to feature Richard Wright, who died on 15 September 2008, one week before the album's official release. Also notably, this concert took place approximately one month following the death of Syd Barrett. Gilmour and his band were backed by the Polish Baltic Philharmonic Orchestra conducted by Zbigniew Preisner. Leszek Możdżer was featured on piano as a special guest.

== Editions ==
The six different available editions of Live in Gdańsk are:

- Two-disc edition containing the concert on CD
- Three-disc edition containing the above plus a DVD featuring 114 minutes of concert footage, plus a 36-minute documentary
- Four-disc edition containing the above plus a 5.1-surround sound mix of On an Island and 11 extra audio-visual tracks taken from various TV appearances
- Five-disc deluxe edition containing the above plus an extra CD containing 12 bonus live tracks from the 2006 tour as well as a wallet of memorabilia.
- Five-LP vinyl edition containing the whole Gdansk show, including "Wot's... Uh the Deal?" and a bonus LP containing 2 Barn Jams, "On the Turning Away" and two songs from Live at Abbey Road.
- iTunes edition containing the entire album, plus various region-dependent audio and video extras.

The DVD that comes with the three-, four-, and five-disc sets allowed the purchaser to download 12 additional tracks free of charge via a web-pass. (As of May 2010, this content is no longer accessible.) These tracks included all 12 tracks on the bonus CD included with the five-disc version, and the song "Wot's...Uh the Deal?" that was performed at the concert but not included on the album itself. The bonus tracks were released one per month as follows:

- September 2008: "Wot's...Uh the Deal?" (Gdańsk)
- October 2008: "Shine on You Crazy Diamond" (Venice and Vienne)
- November 2008: "Dominoes" (Paris)
- December 2008: "The Blue" (Vienne)
- January 2009: "Take a Breath" (Munich)
- February 2009: "Wish You Were Here" (Glasgow)
- March 2009: "Coming Back to Life" (Florence)
- April 2009: "Find the Cost of Freedom" (Manchester)
- May 2009: "This Heaven" (Vienne)
- June 2009: "Wearing the Inside Out" (Milan)
- July 2009: "A Pocketful of Stones" (Vienne)
- August 2009: "Where We Start" (Vienne)
- September 2009: "On the Turning Away" (Venice)

== Track listing ==
Below are the official track listings for the different editions of the album.

=== Standard edition ===
The standard two-CD edition is the most basic form of the album and is simply the recording of the Gdańsk show, omitting "Wot's... Uh the Deal?":

Disc 1

1. "Speak to Me" – 1:23
2. "Breathe" – 2:49
3. "Time" – 5:38
4. "Breathe (Reprise)" – 1:32
5. "Castellorizon" –3:47
6. "On an Island" – 7:26
7. "The Blue" – 6:39
8. "Red Sky at Night" – 3:03
9. "This Heaven" – 4:33
10. "Then I Close My Eyes" – 7:42
11. "Smile" – 4:26
12. "Take a Breath" – 6:47
13. "A Pocketful of Stones" – 5:41
14. "Where We Start" – 8:01

Disc 2

1. "Shine on You Crazy Diamond" – 12:07
2. "Astronomy Domine" – 5:02
3. "Fat Old Sun" – 6:40
4. "High Hopes" – 9:57
5. "Echoes" – 25:26
6. "Wish You Were Here" – 5:15
7. "A Great Day for Freedom" – 5:56
8. "Comfortably Numb" – 9:22

== Promotion ==
UK Television
Gilmour guested on Jools Holland's live TV show Later! Live.... with Jools Holland on BBC2 on 23 September 2008, originally to promote the new live album, performing the songs "Astronomy Domine", "The Blue" and "Fat Old Sun" but with the death of Richard Wright on 15 September he changed his set to "Remember a Day" (one of Rick Wright's contributions to the A Saucerful of Secrets album) and "The Blue" (a track from On an Island to which Wright contributed organ and vocals).

On Friday 26 September 2008, BBC Four held a David Gilmour Night, showing part of the Gdańsk concert and "Gdańsk Diary" documentary.

US Television
VH1 Classic ran parts of the Gdańsk concert on several nights in late October. The programme includes songs omitted from the DVD: "Speak to Me" / "Breathe", "Time", "Shine on You Crazy Diamond", and "Wish You Were Here".

US Cinemas
Selected US cinemas gave showings of the "Gdańsk" concert during release week. This showing also included songs omitted from the DVD: "Speak to Me" / "Breathe", "Time", "Shine on You Crazy Diamond", and "Wish You Were Here", though the theaters' did not show "Echoes".

US Radio
Westwood One aired a world première of the "Gdańsk" concert the weekend before release and included new interviews with David Gilmour.

DavidGilmour.com
Since the announcement of the sets release, Gilmour has had certain songs up on his site that vary, including "Fat Old Sun" and "Wot's... Uh the Deal?" in low quality.

== Personnel ==
Tour personnel

Musicians

- David Gilmour – guitars, lead and backing vocals, console steel guitar, acoustic lap steel guitar, alto saxophone ("Red Sky at Night"), Cümbüş ("Then I Close My Eyes"),
- Richard Wright – piano, Hammond organ, Farfisa organ, lead and backing vocals
- Jon Carin – keyboards, synthesiser, backing vocals, lap steel guitar, programming
- Guy Pratt – bass guitars, backing vocals, double bass, guitar ("Then I Close My Eyes"), glass harmonica ("Shine on You Crazy Diamond")
- Phil Manzanera – guitars, backing vocals, glass harmonica ("Shine on You Crazy Diamond")
- Dick Parry – tenor and baritone saxophones, electronic organ, glass harmonica ("Shine on You Crazy Diamond")
- Steve DiStanislao – drums, percussion, backing vocals
- Zbigniew Preisner – conductor, orchestra arrangements
- Leszek Możdżer – piano
- Polish Baltic Philharmonic – orchestra ("Castellorizon", "On an Island", "The Blue", "Red Sky at Night", "This Heaven", "Then I Close My Eyes", "Smile", "Take a Breath", "A Pocketful of Stones", "Where We Start"; orchestra arrangements by Zbigniew Preisner except those by Michael Kamen below)
- Michael Kamen – orchestra arrangements ("High Hopes", "A Great Day for Freedom" and "Comfortably Numb")
- Igor Sklyarov – glass harmonica ("Shine on You Crazy Diamond", Venice performance only)
- David Crosby and Graham Nash - vocals ("Find the Cost of Freedom")

Other

- Polly Samson – tour photographer
- Anna Wloch – tour photographer
- Steve Knee – package design and artwork
- Andy Jackson, Devin Workman, Damon Iddins – audio mix
- Peter Robson "FEd" – davidgilmour.com
- Marc Brickman – visual design
- David McIlwaine – wire-man sculpture
- Piotr Skonieczny – backstage pass and artist's pass designs and poster design (found in Deluxe Edition)

== Charts ==
=== Weekly charts ===
Chart (2008–2020)	Peak position
Argentinian Albums (CAPIF)	7
Australian Albums (ARIA)	30
Austrian Albums (Ö3 Austria)	28
Belgian Albums (Ultratop Flanders)	22
Belgian Albums (Ultratop Wallonia)	5
Canadian Albums (Billboard)	19
Croatian International Albums (HDU)	3
Czech Albums (ČNS IFPI)	29
Danish Albums (Hitlisten)	38
Dutch Albums (Album Top 100)	14
Dutch Alternative (Album Top 30)	26
French Albums (SNEP)	15
German Albums (Offizielle Top 100)	12
Greek Albums (IFPI)	13
Hungarian Albums (MAHASZ)	20
Irish Albums (IRMA)	22
Italian Albums (FIMI)	7
Japanese Albums (Oricon)	122
Japanese International (Oricon)	62
Mexican Albums (Top 100 Mexico)	52
New Zealand Albums (RMNZ)	20
Norwegian Albums (VG-lista)	34
Polish Albums (ZPAV)	5
Portuguese Albums (AFP)	5
Scottish Albums (Official Charts)	8
Swedish Albums (Sverigetopplistan)	24
Swiss Albums (Schweizer Hitparade)	14
UK Albums (Official Charts)	10
UK Album Downloads (Official Charts)	10
UK Physical Albums (OCC)	9
US Billboard 200	26
US Top Album Sales (Billboard)	26
US Top Current Album Sales (Billboard)	26
US Top Rock Albums (Billboard)	12
US Indie Store Album Sales (Billboard)	6

=== Year-end charts ===
Chart (2008)	Position
UK Albums (OCC)	189

== Certifications ==
Sales certifications for Live in Gdańsk
Region	Certification	Certified units/sales
Brazil (Pro-Música Brasil)	Gold	30,000^{*}
Poland (ZPAV)	Platinum	20,000^{*}
United Kingdom (BPI)	Gold	100,000^{^}
United States	—	19,000
^{*} Sales figures based on certification alone.^{^} Shipments figures based on certification alone.

== Release schedule ==
The release dates for the album are as follows:

- Europe, Brazil, Israel, New Zealand - 22 September 2008
- North America, Argentina, Chile - 23 September 2008
- Australia - 27 September 2008
- Japan - 8 October 2008
