= Remember That Night =

2007 concert video by David Gilmour

Video by David Gilmour
- Released: 17 September 2007 (UK/Europe); 18 September 2007 (US)
- Recorded: 29-31 May 2006
- Venue: Royal Albert Hall (London)
- Genre: Progressive rock
- Length: 313 min.
- Label: David Gilmour Music Ltd.
- Director: David Mallet
- Producer: David Gilmour

David Gilmour video chronology
David Gilmour in Concert (2002)	Remember That Night (2007)	Live in Gdansk (2008)

Singles from Remember That Night
- 1. "Arnold Layne" Released: 26 December 2006

Remember That Night is a live concert recording of Pink Floyd guitarist David Gilmour's solo concerts at the Royal Albert Hall on 29, 30 & 31 May 2006 as part of his On an Island Tour. The title is taken from a line in the song "On an Island". It has been released on both DVD and Blu-ray formats. The DVD version came out 17 September 2007 in the UK, Europe and Australia, and on 18 September 2007 in the US and Canada. The Blu-ray version was released on 20 November 2007. These were David Bowie's final performances in the UK before his death in 2016.

== Track listing ==
=== Disc 1 ===
The main concert at the Royal Albert Hall.

1. "Speak to Me"
2. "Breathe"
3. "Time"
4. "Breathe (Reprise)"
5. "Castellorizon"
6. "On an Island" (with David Crosby and Graham Nash)
7. "The Blue" (with David Crosby and Graham Nash)
8. "Red Sky at Night"
9. "This Heaven"
10. "Then I Close My Eyes" (with Robert Wyatt)
11. "Smile"
12. "Take a Breath"
13. "A Pocketful of Stones"
14. "Where We Start"
15. "Shine On You Crazy Diamond (Parts 1-2, 4-5)" (with David Crosby and Graham Nash)
16. "Fat Old Sun"
17. "Coming Back to Life"
18. "High Hopes"
19. "Echoes"
20. "Wish You Were Here"
21. "Find the Cost of Freedom" (with David Crosby and Graham Nash)
22. "Arnold Layne" (with David Bowie)
23. "Comfortably Numb" (with David Bowie)

The footage is from his concerts at the Royal Albert Hall on 29, 30 & 31 May 2006.

=== Disc 2 ===
This disc contains the following bonus features:

- Bonus tracks from the Albert Hall concerts:
  - "Wot's... Uh the Deal?"
  - "Dominoes"
  - "Wearing the Inside Out"
  - "Arnold Layne" (with Richard Wright)
  - "Comfortably Numb" (with Richard Wright)
- Other bonus tracks:
  - "Dark Globe" (video)
    - "Echoes" (Live from Abbey Road. Hidden track after "Dark Globe")
  - "Astronomy Domine" (Live from Abbey Road)
  - "On an Island" promo video
  - "Smile" promo video
  - "This Heaven" (AOL Sessions performance)
  - "Island Jam" (January 2007 version, recorded at 'The Barn')
- Footage from the Mermaid Theatre concert (March 2006):
  - "Castellorizon"
  - "On an Island"
  - "The Blue"
  - "Take a Breath"
  - "High Hopes"
- Documentaries:
  - West Coast Documentary, filmed between shows in Los Angeles with some shots by Richard Wright
  - Breaking Bread, Drinking Wine, a tour documentary by Gavin Elder
  - The making of On an Island
- Photo Gallery
- Credits

=== Easter Eggs ===
There are at least three hidden videos (or "Easter Eggs") on Disc 2 of the DVD, they are as follows:

- An acoustic version of "Echoes" which plays after the "Dark Globe" track (it will show if you fast forward past "Dark Globe"). This only plays if "Dark Globe" is selected from the menu and will not play while using the "Play All" function.
- A short video of David Gilmour playing the cümbüş. To view this, watch the Main Menu of the DVD and wait about 25 seconds for a firework to appear; then use your DVD remote to quickly select the firework (using the enter button) and this will play the video.
- "On an Island" dance remix video is available on the "Royal Albert Hall" sub-menu of the DVD, which includes bonus tracks from the Albert Hall; again wait about 20 seconds for a firework to play, then select it with your DVD remote.

In addition to these, there are several small videos with further information and interviews in the documentaries which will play if you press the enter button while the "Wireman" is shown in the window.

== Publicity ==
=== Cinema broadcasts ===
The UK/Europe premiere took place at the Leicester Square Odeon on 6 September 2007. It was transmitted live by satellite to various European cinemas. The North American premiere took place on 15 September 2007.

=== Television broadcasts ===
BBC One aired an hour of footage from the main concert on 8 September 2007, repeated on 25 May 2008 on BBC Four. This included the tracks:

1. "Speak to Me"
2. "On an Island"
3. "This Heaven"
4. "Smile"
5. "The Blue"
6. "Shine On You Crazy Diamond"
7. "Fat Old Sun"
8. "Coming Back to Life"
9. "Arnold Layne"
10. "Find the Cost of Freedom"
11. "Wish You Were Here"

=== Live single ===
As part of the build-up to the release of the DVD, a two-track single was released as a download via the iTunes Store with the tracks "Wish You Were Here" and "The Blue" taken from the DVD.

== Personnel ==
- David Gilmour – lead and backing vocals, guitars, console steel guitar, acoustic lap steel guitar, cümbüs, alto saxophone on "Red Sky at Night"
- Richard Wright – lead and backing vocals, Hammond organ, Farfisa organ, piano
- Dick Parry – baritone & alto saxophones, electronic organ
- Phil Manzanera – guitars, backing vocals
- Guy Pratt – bass guitar, double bass, backing vocals, guitar on "Then I Close My Eyes"
- Jon Carin – synthesiser, piano, keyboards, programming, lap steel guitar, backing vocals, co-lead vocals on "Breathe", "The Blue", "Take A Breath" and "Echoes"
- Steve DiStanislao – drums, percussion, backing vocals

=== Guests ===
- David Bowie – lead vocals on "Arnold Layne" and "Comfortably Numb"
- David Crosby and Graham Nash – backing vocals on "Shine On You Crazy Diamond", "On An Island" and "The Blue"; harmonised lead vocals on "Find the Cost of Freedom"
- Robert Wyatt – cornet on "Then I Close My Eyes"

== Charts ==
=== Weekly charts ===
Chart performance for Remember That Night
Chart (2007–2017)	Peak position
Argentine Music DVD (CAPIF)	9
Australian Music DVD (ARIA)	2
Austrian Music DVD (Ö3 Austria)	1
Belgian Music DVD (Ultratop Flanders)	1
Belgian Music DVD (Ultratop Wallonia)	1
Danish Music DVD (Hitlisten)	1
Dutch Music DVD (MegaCharts)	2
Finnish Music DVD (Suomen virallinen lista)	4
German Albums (Offizielle Top 100)	9
Greek Music DVD (IFPI)	3
Irish Music DVD (IRMA)	2
Italian Music DVD (FIMI)	1
New Zealand Music DVD (RMNZ)	1
Norwegian Music DVD (VG-lista)	1
Portuguese Music DVD (AFP)	1
Spanish Music DVD (Promusicae)	6
Swedish Music DVD (Sverigetopplistan)	1
Swiss Music DVD (Schweizer Hitparade)	3
UK Music Videos (Official Charts)	1
US Music Videos (Billboard)	2

== Certifications ==
Sales certifications for Remember That Night
Region	Certification	Certified units/sales
Argentina (CAPIF)	Platinum	8,000^{^}
Australia (ARIA)	Gold	7,500^{^}
Canada (Music Canada)	2× Platinum	20,000^{^}
France (SNEP)	Platinum	20,000^{*}
Germany (BVMI)	Gold	25,000^{^}
Italy	—	15,000
New Zealand (RMNZ)	Platinum	5,000^{^}
Portugal (AFP)	Gold	4,000^{^}
United Kingdom (BPI)	Platinum	50,000^{^}
United States (RIAA)	Platinum	100,000^{^}
^{*} Sales figures based on certification alone.^{^} Shipments figures based on certification alone.
