= Take a Breath =

Take a Breath may refer to:

- "Take a Breath" (song), a song by David Gilmour
- Take a Breath (album), an album by Hateful Monday
- "Take a Breath", a song by the Jonas Brothers from the album Jonas Brothers
