= Echoes (Pink Floyd song) =

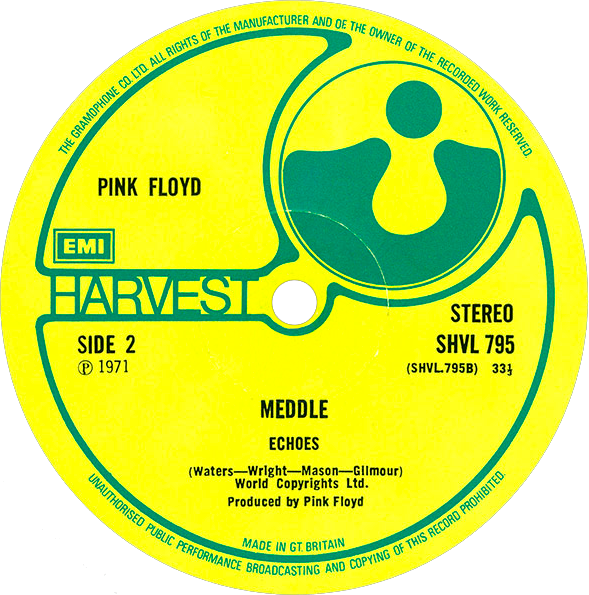
- Side B of Meddle, which contains only "Echoes"

Song by Pink Floyd

from the album Meddle
- Released: 5 November 1971
- Recorded: 7 March – 1 May 1971
- Studio: Abbey Road, AIR and Morgan, London
- Genre: Progressive rock
- Length: 23:29 (album version) 16:30 (Echoes: The Best of Pink Floyd version) 24:56 (Live at Pompeii version); 26:25 (BBC Radio Session, 1971 version)
- Label: Harvest
- Composers: Richard Wright; David Gilmour; Roger Waters; Nick Mason
- Lyricist: Roger Waters
- Producer: Pink Floyd

Official audio
- "Echoes" on YouTube

"Echoes" is a song by the English rock band Pink Floyd, and the sixth and last track on their 1971 album Meddle. It is 23 1/2 minutes long and takes up the entire second side of the original LP. The track evolved from a variety of different musical themes and ideas, including instrumental passages and studio effects, resulting in the side-long piece. The music, credited to the band, was written by Richard Wright and David Gilmour, while Roger Waters' lyrics addressed themes of human communication and empathy, to which he returned in later work.

The song was performed live regularly by Pink Floyd from 1971 to 1975, including a performance in the film Live at Pompeii (1972). It was used for the opening shows on the 1987 A Momentary Lapse of Reason Tour but subsequently dropped. Gilmour revived "Echoes" for his 2006 On an Island Tour, which featured Wright, but retired the piece after Wright's death in 2008. Nick Mason's Saucerful of Secrets has since played the song as part of its Echoes Tour. The studio recording was used in the film Crystal Voyager (1973) while an edited version is included on the band's greatest hits album Echoes: The Best of Pink Floyd (2001).

"Echoes" has been regarded by critics as an important song that transitions between Pink Floyd's early experimental material as a cult band and later mainstream success. Several publications have remarked it as one of the best songs by the group. The group have mixed views of the track, but it was a particular favourite of Wright's.

== Structure ==
"Echoes"
First verse, showing vocal harmonies

"Echoes" begins with a "ping" that was created as a result of an experiment very early in the Meddle sessions, produced by amplifying a grand piano played by Richard Wright and sending the signal through a Leslie speaker and a Binson Echorec unit. After several "pings", a slide guitar played by David Gilmour gradually joins in. The verses are sung in harmony by Gilmour and Wright, and joined by a riff played by Gilmour and bassist Roger Waters in unison. This is followed by a guitar solo from Gilmour, played on a Fender Stratocaster through a Fuzz Face effects box, before repeating the previous riff. This leads into a funk-influenced jam.

The middle section of the song features Waters using a slide and a Binson Echorec. Gilmour plays a high-pitched screeching noise, which was created by plugging a wah-wah pedal in back to front (the guitar was plugged into the output of the pedal, and the input of the pedal was plugged into the input of the amplifier). Drummer Nick Mason later clarified that it was an accident, and their experience working with Ron Geesin had taught them to embrace experiments and try anything if it would work on a song. This is followed by a repeat of the opening piano "pings" and a Farfisa organ solo from Wright, said to have been influenced by the Beach Boys' "Good Vibrations" (1967).

Following a final third verse, the end of the piece features a choral-sounding segment playing a Shepard tone. This was created by placing two tape recorders in opposite corners of a room; the main chord tapes of the song were then fed into one recorder and played back while at the same time recording. The other recorder was then also set to play what was being recorded; this created a delay between both recordings.

== Composition ==
"Echoes" began as a collection of separate musical experiments, some of which were left over from previous sessions. Pink Floyd then arranged the pieces in order to make a coherent piece originally referred to as "Nothing, Parts 1–24". Not all of the pieces were used for the finished track, and out-takes included saying a phrase backwards, so it would sound correct yet strange when the tape was reversed. Subsequent tapes of work in progress were labelled "The Son of Nothing" and "The Return of the Son of Nothing"; the latter title was eventually used to introduce the as-yet-unreleased work in its first live performances in early 1971.

Wright said he composed the piano intro and the main chord progression of the song, and that Waters wrote the lyrics. During early development, before the first verse was finalised, it referred to the meeting of two celestial bodies. For the final lyrics, Waters took inspiration from his time in London in the mid to late 1960s, feeling a sense of disconnection and looking for the potential for humans to connect with each other. One particular observation was looking from his flat on Goldhawk Road and watching a procession of commuters walk past, which led to "Strangers passing in the street". "Echoes" established a trend with Waters to write emphatic words and explore the theme of communication, which would be a key theme of The Dark Side of the Moon (1973) and later solo work.

Pink Floyd rehearsed the completed piece before committing a final version to tape. Studio recording was split between Abbey Road Studios, Morgan Studios and AIR Studios in London; the latter two were used because they had a 16-track recorder, which made assembling the individual components of the songs easier. The basic backing tracks were recorded between 7 and 19 March at Abbey Road, with the further overdubs recorded at AIR from 30 March to 1 May, with additional work at Morgan.

Waters accused Andrew Lloyd Webber of plagiarising a prominent instrumental from "Echoes" for the main theme in the 1986 musical The Phantom of the Opera. However he decided against filing a lawsuit.

== Live performances ==
Pink Floyd first performed "Echoes" at Norwich Lads Club on 22 April 1971, and it was a regular part of the band's set, up to the concert at Knebworth Park on 5 July 1975. The first significant performance was at the Crystal Palace Bowl on 15 May with an audience of 15,000. It was originally announced by its working title, "Return of the Son of Nothing" and not formally identified as "Echoes" until the group's tour of Japan, starting on 6 August 1971. Occasionally, Waters would introduce the song with silly titles, such as "Looking Through the Knotholes in Granny's Wooden Leg", "We Won The Double" (a reference to Arsenal F.C. winning the double in the 1970–71 season), and "March of the Dambusters".

The song was played at a BBC Radio 1 concert on 30 September 1971 and broadcast on 12 October. Shortly afterwards, Pink Floyd filmed a live performance at the Amphitheatre of Pompeii with no audience for Live at Pompeii, where it was split in two halves to open and close the film. "Echoes" was one of four pieces that Pink Floyd played in collaboration with a ballet choreographed by Roland Petit in late 1972 and early 1973. The track featured a solo ballet piece for Rudy Bryans of the Ballets de Marseille. For the group's 1973 shows at Earl's Court, the performance of "Echoes" featured large quantities of dry ice being poured onto the stage during the middle section, and sheets of flame shooting from a cauldron at the back of the stage.

From late 1974 to the Knebworth concert, "Echoes" was performed as an encore. These performances featured backing vocals by Venetta Fields and Carlena Williams and saxophone solos by Dick Parry instead of the guitar solos in earlier performances. "Echoes" was performed for the first eleven shows on the band's 1987 A Momentary Lapse of Reason tour, in a slightly rearranged version trimmed down to 17 minutes. However, Gilmour was uncomfortable about singing the "hippy" lyrics, and the touring musicians found it difficult to replicate the sound of the studio original, so it was replaced with "Shine On You Crazy Diamond".

Gilmour resurrected the song on his 2006 On an Island Tour as the closing number of the main set, with Wright performing in his band. Wright said he still liked playing the song live and was amazed by the audience response to the opening "ping" when on tour. These performances appear on Gilmour's Remember That Night film and Live in Gdańsk album/film. A special acoustic version, featuring just Gilmour and Wright and filmed live at Abbey Road, featured as a hidden track on Remember That Night. Gilmour told Rolling Stone in 2016 upon returning to Pompeii to play a solo show that he would have loved to perform "Echoes" but felt he could not do so without Wright, who had died in 2008 – "There's something that's specifically so individual about the way that Rick and I play in that, that you can't get someone to learn it and do it just like that." Similarly, Mason initially did not play "Echoes" live with Nick Mason's Saucerful of Secrets as he felt the track is too strongly identified with Wright. However, in 2022 the song was added to their setlists as part of their "The Echoes Tour", and has been performed live regularly by the band since.

== Release ==
"Echoes" occupied the whole of the second side of the album Meddle, released on 30 October 1971. Mason later said this might have been because the group wanted to put more suitable material for radio on side one. An edited version of the song appeared on the 2001 compilation Echoes: The Best of Pink Floyd, and as part of an 8-track promotional sampler.

The live performance at Pompeii was released to cinemas in September 1972. It was first released on video in 1983, then on DVD in 2003. Several works-in-progress pieces and live performances were released on the 2016 box set The Early Years 1965–1972.

== Reception ==
In a review for the Meddle album, Jean-Charles Costa of Rolling Stone gave "Echoes" a positive review. Costa described "Echoes" as "a 23-minute Pink Floyd aural extravaganza that takes up all of side two, recaptures, within a new musical framework, some of the old themes and melody lines from earlier albums", adding: "All of this plus a funky organ-bass-drums segment and a stunning Gilmour solo adds up to a fine extended electronic outing."

NME covered Pink Floyd's opening date on their 1972 Dark Side of the Moon Tour at the Brighton Dome and called "Echoes" a highlight of the set, saying that it was "masterful". Reviewing the 1975 Knebworth concert, Sounds said that despite a mixed performance in the main set, "Echoes" was "pretty superb" and "played flawlessly". Rolling Stone said that Gilmour's live performance of the piece in Gdańsk at the end of the On an Island Tour in 2006 was "jaw-dropping". Touring guitarist Phil Manzanera said "that version of 'Echoes' was the longest one and the best one. Life is funny. It's cosmic. It's like Richard knew something was up, and he stayed on longer. It's a magical song."

Mike Cormack said that "If Pink Floyd had done nothing after Meddle, "Echoes" would have assured them of a place in rock’s highest echelon", and that the song "is the single greatest long-form track in rock music, with a grandeur, scale and imagination that leaves everyone else for dead." Author Ed Macan has called "Echoes" Pink Floyd's "masterpiece" and an important bridge between the group as a cult band and later mainstream success. Andy Cush has said that the track is a transition between the group's experimental material and later commercial success, emphasising that it is "ambitious beyond anything Pink Floyd had attempted before, wild beyond anything they’d attempt after". In 2008, Uncut magazine ranked "Echoes" number 30 in a list of Pink Floyd's 30 best songs, while in 2011, readers of Rolling Stone named it as the fifth-best song by Pink Floyd.

The members of Pink Floyd have mixed views on the track. Wright said that the piece was "a highlight" and "one of the finest tracks the Floyd have ever done". Waters and Gilmour have said that it was a foretaste of things to come in The Dark Side of the Moon, while Mason has said that it was "a bit overlong".

== Film ==
The 1973 George Greenough film Crystal Voyager concludes with a 23-minute segment in which the full version of "Echoes" accompanies a montage of images shot by Greenough from a camera mounted on his back while surfing on his kneeboard. The group allowed Greenough and director David Elfick to use the music in their film in exchange for the use of Greenough's footage as a visual background when they performed "Echoes" in concert. In the early 1990s, this footage was planned to be used in an advertisement for toilet cleaner, but it did not get clearance from the band.

Similar to the Dark Side of the Rainbow effect, fans have suggested that "Echoes" coincidentally synchronises with Stanley Kubrick's 1968 film 2001: A Space Odyssey, when played concurrently with the final 23-minute segment titled "Jupiter and Beyond the Infinite". Kubrick later used copies of both the soundtrack to 2001 and Pink Floyd's Atom Heart Mother (1970) as props in the record store scene in A Clockwork Orange (1971).

== Cover versions ==
Alien Sex Fiend covered the track for a Pink Floyd tribute album A Saucerful of Pink, released in July 1995. British musician Ewan Cunningham covered "Echoes" in 2017 and uploaded a YouTube of him playing all of the parts himself. This cover was heavily based on the Live at Pompeii version and was praised by Mason, who said: "Looks like we're all out of a job!"

The acoustic guitar duo Rodrigo y Gabriela covered "Echoes" on their 2019 album Mettavolution, one of seven tracks which won the album an award for Best Contemporary Instrumental Album at the 62nd Annual Grammy Awards in 2020. In reviewing this cover version, Rolling Stone wrote that "like the original, the song is its own journey, and it's beautiful".

== Personnel ==
According to Jean-Michel Guesdon and Philippe Margotin:

- David Gilmour – vocals, electric guitar
- Richard Wright – vocals, Hammond organ, piano, Farfisa organ
- Roger Waters – bass guitar
- Nick Mason – drums, percussion
