= Binson Echorec =

Brand of echo machine

The Binson Echorec is a delay effects unit produced by Italian company Binson. Unlike most other electromechanical delays, the Echorec uses an analog magnetic drum recorder instead of a tape loop.

After using Meazzi Echomatic machines, Hank Marvin of the Shadows began using Binson echoes. He used various Binson units on record and stage for much of the mid-to-late 1960s. Marvin continued to use Binsons until c.1979/1980, when he began using a Roland Space Echo.

Echorecs were used by The Beatles, and also by Syd Barrett, David Gilmour, and Richard Wright of Pink Floyd. The Echorec can be heard on Pink Floyd songs including "Interstellar Overdrive", "Astronomy Domine", "Shine On You Crazy Diamond", "Time", "One of These Days", and "Echoes". A Binson Echorec Baby owned by the band was displayed at the Victoria and Albert Museum as part of the 2017 Pink Floyd: Their Mortal Remains exhibition.

== See also ==
- Roland Space Echo
- Echoplex

== Bibliography ==
- Prendergast, Mark (2003), The Ambient Century, Bloomsbury, ISBN 1-58234-323-3
