= Coming Back to Life =

Song by Pink Floyd

from the album The Division Bell
- Released: 28 March 1994
- Recorded: 1993
- Genre: Progressive rock
- Length: 6:19
- Label: EMI (UK); Columbia (US)
- Songwriter: David Gilmour
- Producers: Bob Ezrin; David Gilmour

"Coming Back to Life" is a song from Pink Floyd's 1994 album The Division Bell, and is the only track from the album to be credited solely to David Gilmour.

== Composition ==
Gilmour has said (as can be heard on the David Gilmour in Concert DVD) that the song was written about his wife, Polly Samson.

== Personnel ==
- David Gilmour – vocals, guitars
- Richard Wright – Kurzweil synthesisers, Hammond organ
- Nick Mason – drums

Additional musicians:

- Guy Pratt – bass guitar
- Gary Wallis – percussion

== Live performances ==
The song has been a staple in Gilmour's performances from 1994 to 2016. It was one of the songs performed on rotation during the 1994 Division Bell Tour, at every one of Gilmour's semi-acoustic shows in 2001 and 2002, at Gilmour's performance at the Fender Stratocaster 50th anniversary concert in London in 2004, and was played at most shows during his solo 2006 On an Island Tour. It became a staple of shows during the 2015-16 Rattle That Lock Tour and the 2024 Luck and Strange tour.

=== Live personnel ===
Pink Floyd, 1994 tour

David Gilmour – electric guitar, lead vocals
Richard Wright – organ
Nick Mason – drums

with:
Guy Pratt – bass
Tim Renwick – acoustic guitar
Jon Carin – synthesiser
Gary Wallis – percussion
Sam Brown – backing vocals
Claudia Fontaine – backing vocals
Durga McBroom – backing vocals

David Gilmour, 2006 and 2015–16 tours

David Gilmour – electric guitar, lead vocals
Richard Wright – organ (2006 only)
Phil Manzanera – electric guitar (except 2016 second leg)
Guy Pratt – bass
Jon Carin – synthesiser (except 2016 second leg)
Steve DiStanislao – drums
Kevin McAlea – organ (2015–16 only)
Bryan Chambers – backing vocals (2015–16 only)
Lucita Jules – backing vocals (2015–16 only)
Louise Clare Marshall – backing vocals (2015–16 only)
Chester Kamen – electric guitar (2016 second leg only)
Chuck Leavell – organ (2016 second leg only)
Greg Phillinganes – synthesiser (2016 second leg only)

=== Live releases ===
The song appears on the following live albums, DVDs or Blu-rays:

- Pulse (album) (Pink Floyd, 1995)
- Pulse (VHS/DVD) (Pink Floyd, 1995 [VHS], 2003 [DVD])
- David Gilmour in Concert (DVD) (David Gilmour, 2002)
- Remember That Night (DVD/Blu-ray) (David Gilmour, 2007)
- Live in Gdańsk (album, deluxe edition bonus CD) (David Gilmour, 2008)
- Live at Pompeii (album, DVD/BD) (David Gilmour, 2017)
