= A Great Day for Freedom =

Song by Pink Floyd

from the album The Division Bell
- Released: 28 March 1994
- Recorded: 1993
- Genre: Progressive rock; symphonic rock
- Length: 4:17
- Label: EMI (UK); Columbia (US)
- Songwriters: David Gilmour; Polly Samson
- Producers: Bob Ezrin; David Gilmour

"A Great Day for Freedom" is a song by Pink Floyd from their 1994 album, The Division Bell.

== Writing ==
The song, originally titled "In Shades of Grey", addresses the great hopes following the fall of the Berlin Wall and the disappointment that followed. David Gilmour stated:

There was a wonderful moment of optimism when the Wall came down – the release of Eastern Europe from the non-democratic side of the socialist system. But what they have now doesn't seem to be much better. Again, I'm fairly pessimistic about it all. I sort of wish and live in hope, but I tend to think that history moves at a much slower pace than we think it does. I feel that real change takes a long, long time.

Despite Gilmour's statements to the contrary, the lyrics have often been read as a reflection on the bitter and estranged partnership Gilmour had with former bandmate Roger Waters, who was the driving force behind the band's album The Wall. By this interpretation, the "Great Day for Freedom" would be the day Waters left the band, giving the other members freedom to determine the band's future direction. Gilmour commented on this reading: "I'm quite happy for people to interpret The Division Bell any way they like. But maybe a note of caution should be sounded because you can read too much into it. 'A Great Day for Freedom', for example, has got nothing to do with Roger or his 'wall'. It just doesn't. What else can I say?" According to session player Jon Carin the track was a leftover from the sessions for the band's previous album, A Momentary Lapse of Reason.

In 2022, the song was reworked by Gilmour based on the original tapes, adding some new vocals, instruments and backing vocals by Sam Brown, Durga McBroom and Claudia Fontaine taken from the Pulse rehearsals. It was released as the B-side of the "Hey, Hey, Rise Up!" single.

== Live ==
The song was performed by the band on selected dates of The Division Bell tour, and is available on the Pulse (1995) live album, but was omitted from the Pulse VHS and DVD. Gilmour performed it at his solo semi-acoustic concerts in 2002 which can be seen on the David Gilmour in Concert (2002) DVD. The song also made just one appearance during Gilmour's 2006 On an Island Tour, at the final show in Gdańsk, Poland; this performance can be found on the live album/DVD Live in Gdańsk (2008). It was performed during most of the shows on David Gilmour's Luck and Strange tour in 2024, and appears on the subsequent video and audio releases.

== Personnel ==
=== The Division Bell ===
- David Gilmour – guitar, bass, vocals
- Nick Mason – drums, tambourine

Additional musicians:

- Jon Carin - piano, Prophet-5 synthesizer
- Michael Kamen – orchestral arrangement

=== The Division Bell Tour, 1994 ===
- David Gilmour – electric guitar, lead vocals
- Richard Wright – synthesizer
- Nick Mason – drums

with:

- Guy Pratt – bass
- Jon Carin – piano, Hammond organ, vocals
- Gary Wallis – percussion
- Tim Renwick – acoustic guitar
- Sam Brown – backing vocals
- Claudia Fontaine – backing vocals
- Durga McBroom – backing vocals

=== David Gilmour Live in Gdańsk, 2006 ===
- David Gilmour – electric guitar, lead vocals
- Richard Wright – synthesizer
- Guy Pratt – bass
- Steve DiStanislao – drums
- Phil Manzanera – acoustic guitar
- Jon Carin – keyboards, vocals

with:

- Leszek Możdżer – piano
- Polish Baltic Philharmonic orchestra, conducted by Zbigniew Preisner

=== A Great Day for Freedom 2022 ===
- David Gilmour – lead vocals and harmony vocals, guitar, bass, piano, Prophet 5 synthesizer, Hammond organ
- Nick Mason – drums
- Richard Wright – synthesizer
- Sam Brown – backing vocals
- Claudia Fontaine – backing vocals
- Durga McBroom – backing vocals
