= Wearing the Inside Out =

Song by Pink Floyd

from the album The Division Bell
- Released: 28 March 1994
- Recorded: 1993
- Genre: Progressive rock; jazz fusion
- Length: 6:49
- Label: EMI (UK); Columbia (US)
- Songwriters: Richard Wright; Anthony Moore
- Producers: Bob Ezrin; David Gilmour

"Wearing the Inside Out" is a song from Pink Floyd's 1994 album, The Division Bell. A collaboration between Richard Wright and Anthony Moore, it is the only song on the album for which David Gilmour receives no writing credit.

The song had the working title "Evrika". Two videos of the band working on this demo version can be seen on the DVD/BD included in The Endless River deluxe edition and as part of the iTunes deluxe edition.

It was the first time that Richard Wright sang lead vocals on a song since "Time" and "Us and Them" on the band's 1973 album The Dark Side of the Moon. In a 1994 interview, Wright said the vocal was his first take.

Bassist and past touring member Guy Pratt said the song originated from his idea of a bass riff involving harmonics.

== Later performances ==
The song was rarely performed live by Pink Floyd, although it was performed on David Gilmour's 2006 On an Island Tour (for which Wright was a member of the tour band), appears on the Remember That Night DVD and on the bonus CD of the deluxe version of Live in Gdańsk. On this version, Guy Pratt begins with the aforementioned bass riff.

== Personnel ==
- Richard Wright – lead vocals, synthesiser, Hammond organ, piano
- David Gilmour – guitar, co-lead and backing vocals
- Nick Mason – drums, tambourine

Additional musicians:

- Guy Pratt – bass guitar
- Dick Parry – tenor saxophone
- Sam Brown – backing vocals
- Durga McBroom – backing vocals
- Carol Kenyon – backing vocals
- Jackie Sheridan – backing vocals
- Rebecca Leigh-White – backing vocals
