= Wot's... Uh the Deal? =

Song by Pink Floyd

from the album Obscured by Clouds
- Released: 3 June 1972
- Recorded: February, March 1972
- Studio: Château d'Hérouville, Pontoise, France
- Genre: Folk rock
- Length: 5:09
- Label: Harvest
- Songwriters: Roger Waters; David Gilmour
- Producer: Pink Floyd

"Wot's... Uh the Deal?" is a song from Pink Floyd's 1972 album, Obscured by Clouds. The song features multi-tracked vocals by David Gilmour, who also wrote the music, and lyrics by Roger Waters that describe taking advantage of certain opportunities life gives and how they affect a person later on. The lyric "Flash the readies, Wot's...Uh the Deal" is reported to be a phrase by roadie Chris Adamson.

== Live performances ==
David Gilmour performed it at several shows on his 2006 On an Island tour and it appears on the live DVD and Blu-ray Remember That Night (2007) as well as the vinyl version of his live album Live in Gdańsk. It was also made available to download for people who bought the deluxe edition or iTunes edition.

== Personnel ==
=== Original ===
- David Gilmour – acoustic guitars, lap steel guitar, lead and backing vocals
- Richard Wright – piano, Hammond organ
- Roger Waters – bass guitar
- Nick Mason – drums

=== David Gilmour 2006 live personnel ===
- David Gilmour – acoustic guitar, lap steel guitar, lead vocals
- Richard Wright – piano
- Jon Carin – organ, backing vocals
- Phil Manzanera – acoustic guitar, backing vocals
- Guy Pratt – bass guitar, backing vocals
- Steve DiStanislao – drums
