= Cümbüş =

Turkish stringed instrument

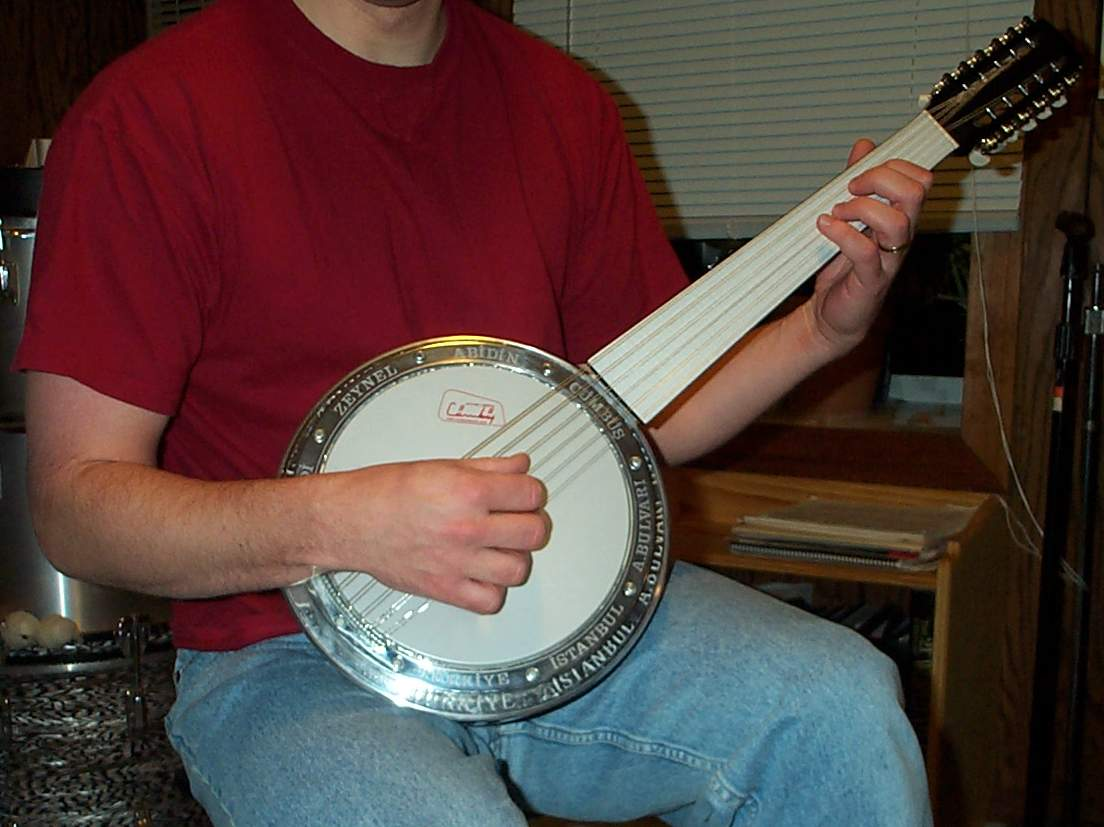
- The standard cümbüş with 12 strings and no fretboard, configured as an oud
- Classification: Plucked string instrument; Folk instrument

Related instruments
- Banjo; Bağlama; Guitar; Komuz; Mandolin; Oud; Turkish tambur; Ukulele; Yaylı tambur

The cümbüş (/dʒuːmˈbuːʃ/; Turkish pronunciation: [dʒymˈbyʃ]) is a Turkish stringed instrument of relatively modern origin. It was developed in 1930 by Zeynel Abidin Cümbüş as an oud-like instrument that could be heard as part of a larger ensemble.

The cümbüş is shaped like an American banjo, with a spun-aluminium resonator bowl and skin soundboard. Although originally configured as an oud, the instrument has been converted to other instruments by attaching a different set of neck and strings. The standard cümbüş is fretless, but guitar, mandolin and ukulele versions have fretboards. The neck is adjustable, allowing the musician to change the angle of the neck to its strings by turning a screw. One model is made with a wooden resonator bowl, with the effect of a less tinny, softer sound.

== Origin of the maker and the name ==
Zeynel Abidin Cümbüş holding one of the instruments he invented, from a newspaper clipping

The word cümbüş is derived from the Turkish for "revelry" or "fun", as the instrument was marketed as a popular alternative to the more costly classical oud. Unlike inventors who name their inventions after themselves, Zeynel Abidin Cümbüş took his last name from his instrument. He was born Zeynel Abidin in Skopje, Macedonia and immigrated to Beyazit, Istanbul, Turkey. His name is often written "Zeynel Abidin Bey" online in Turkey, where Bey is an honorific, such as mister. Early instruments show his name as he wrote it "Zeynelabidin" (a single name, not two). When Mustafa Kemal Atatürk decreed that families take surnames in 1934, Zeynel Abidin adopted the name of his famous instrument.

== Rising and falling with social tides ==
After the Turkish War of Independence Zeynel Abidin Cümbüş wanted to create a new instrument to embody the ideals of peace, an instrument for the masses. He switched his company from dealing with arms to manufacturing musical instruments for "the support of peace through music." In a meeting with Mustafa Kemal Atatürk, the founder of the Republic of Turkey, he showed one of his new inventions. It was "an inexpensive instrument easy to transport and hard to break, capable of playing both Eastern alaturka music and, with a quick change of removable necks, Western alafranga music as well." It was a modern instrument for a modern country.

The cümbüş was inexpensive and was bought by people who couldn't afford a more expensive instrument; as a result, his dream of the masses accepting it was marginalized. The instrument became a folk instrument of the poor and of ethnic minorities in Turkey, including Rûm, Armenians, Jews, Kurds, and Romani and the Arabs in Turkey especiallay the Arabs in Siirt and Mardin, "playing indigenous folk music or repertoires shared with ethnic Turks." It was excluded specifically by classical musicians of the era, being seen as lower-class or ethnic. A perception grew of it being "other" or ethnic or different or lower-class, and Turkish society did not adopt the instrument widely. By the 1960s, use of the cümbüş declined among these minorities, except for Román professional musicians. They adopted the instrument because of its ability to be heard alongside the other instruments they played at weddings and parties.

=== Turnaround ===
Beginning in the mid-1990s, more people started to take up the instrument again at Armenian and Jewish folk music revivals and in Kurdish and Romani folk music recordings. It has been since taken up by modern Turkish-rock and techno musicians, some making statements with the way the music sounds, and others apolitical or humanistic or spiritual.

== Present-day ==
Cümbüş Music is still an active company in Istanbul and manufactures a wide range of traditional Turkish instruments. The instruments are hand made in the family's workshop in Istanbul, by three members of the Cümbüş family, Naci Abidin Cümbüş and his two sons Fethi and Alizeynel. They still make approximately 3000 cümbüşes a year (as of 2002). They also manufacture about 5000 darbukas per year (middle-eastern drums), and sell guitars as well. They export approximately half the cümbüşes to the United States, France and Greece.

== Models ==
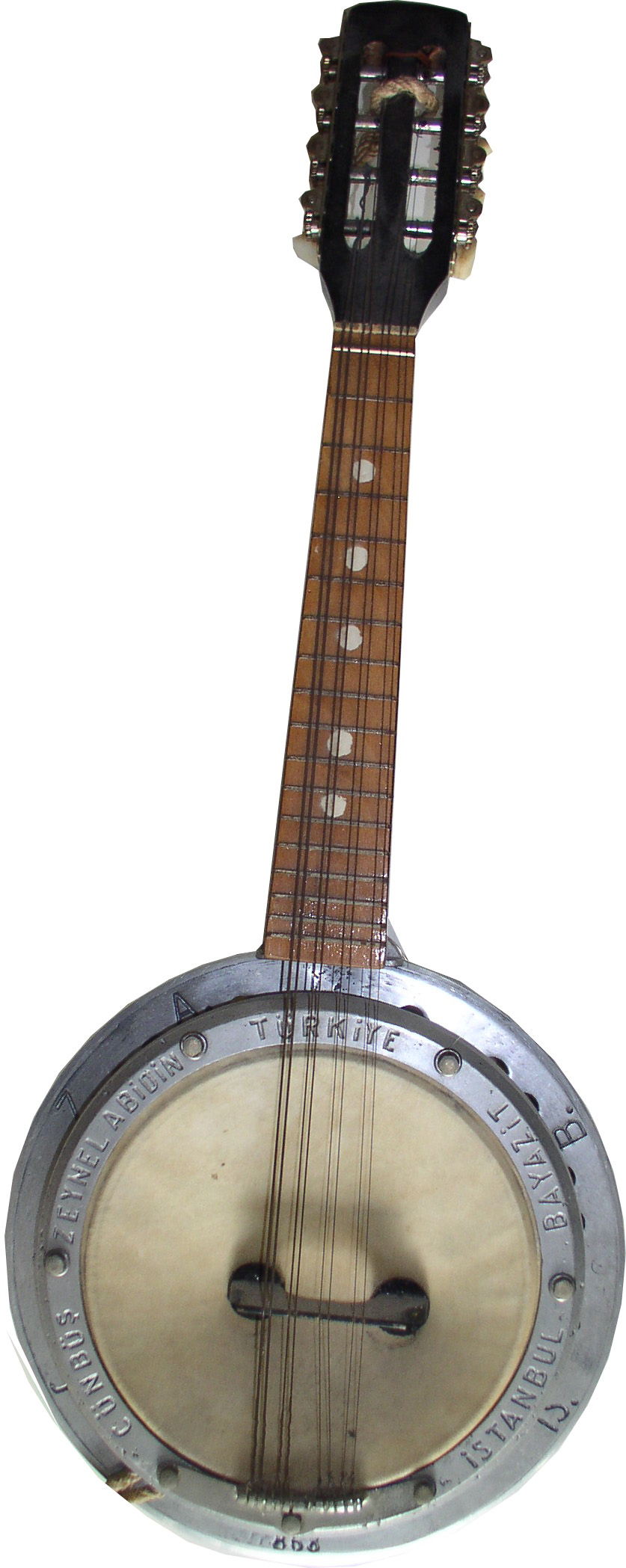
Mando-cümbüş, a Turkish banjo in the style of a mandolin. On this instrument the name is spelled Cünbüş instead of Cümbüş.

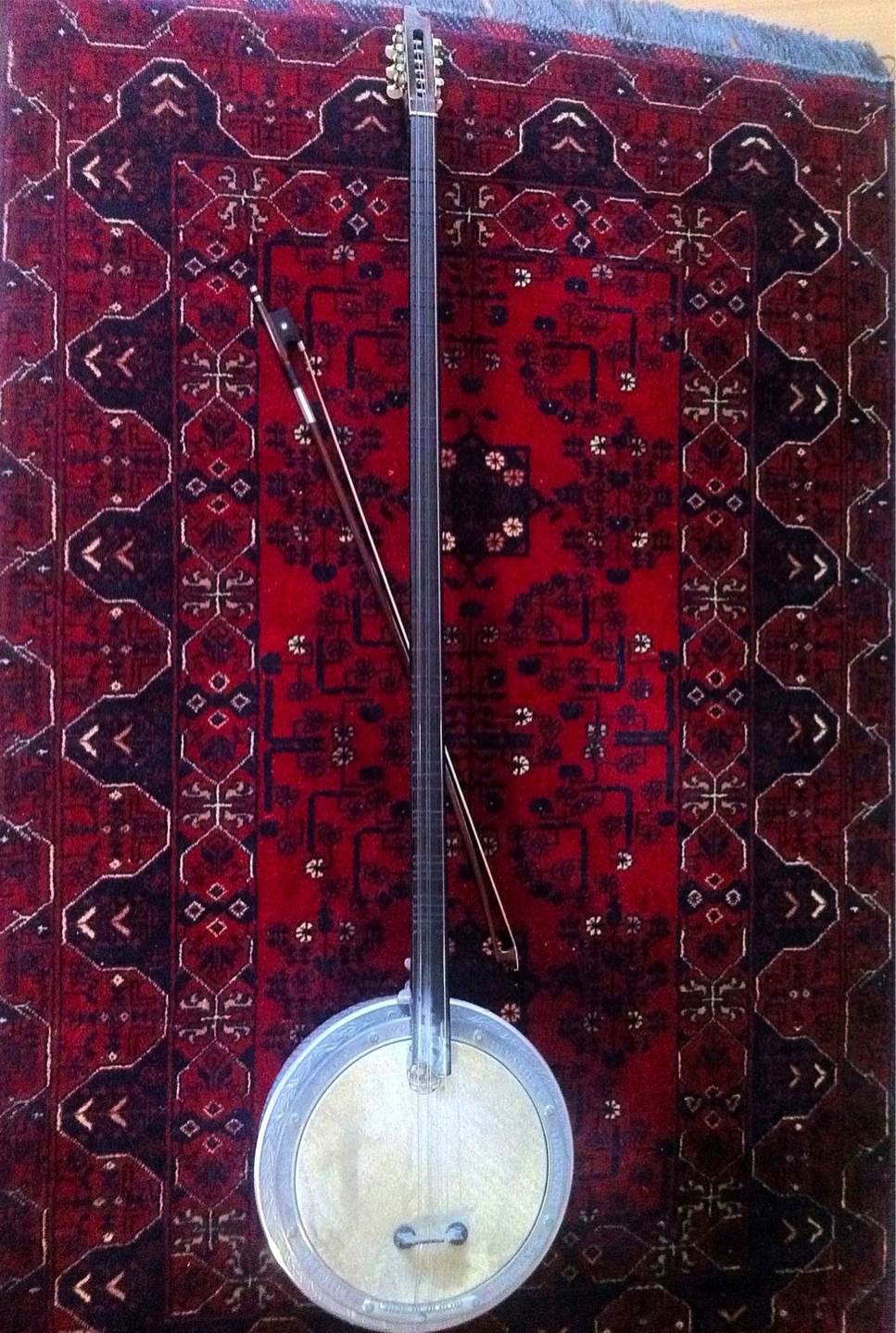
Tanbur Cümbüş of Dr. Ozan Yarman photographed in his residence at Istanbul in January 2013.

The Cümbüş Company in Istanbul, Turkey manufactures several different models. They include:

- Cümbüş: tuned like an oud, short neck, fretless, six courses of strings, 34 inches long overall
- Cümbüş Extra: like the standard cümbüş but has wooden resonator instead of metal
- Cümbüş Saz: tuned like the a bağlama, long neck, tie-on frets, three courses of strings, 40 inches long overall
- Cümbüş Cura: tuned like the bağlama, but higher pitched as a cura saz; three courses of strings, 29 inches long overall
- Cümbüş Tambur: tuned like the Turkish tambur, also spelled tanbur; super long neck, three courses of strings, 51 inches long overall
- Cümbüş Bowed-Tambur: tuned like a Yaylı tambur, played with a bow
- Cümbüş Guitar: fretted, tuned like a guitar, six strings, 34 inches long overall
- Cümbüş Banco: fretted, small, tuned like a mandolin four courses of strings 23 inches long overall
- Cümbüş Ukulele: fretted, small, tuned like a ukulele, four strings, 21 inches long overall

== Tuning ==
=== Standard cümbüş ===
The cümbüş has its own tuning, but can be tuned the same as an oud.

- Cümbüş: AA2 BB2 EE3 AA3 DD4 GG4

== Use in Western popular music ==
- David Lindley played a cümbüş with Ry Cooder in the soundtrack of Paris, Texas.
- Pink Floyd guitarist David Gilmour played cümbüş on his solo album On An Island on the track "Then I Close My Eyes". It can also be heard on the album opener "Castellorizon". He also used the instrument to play the same parts on the subsequent tour, performances of which can be seen and heard on the DVDs Remember That Night and Live in Gdańsk. In 2024, he played it on the track Sings.
- Stone Temple Pilots guitarist Dean DeLeo played a cümbüş on the album Shangri-La Dee Da on the track "Regeneration". It can be heard during the chorus.
- Smokey Hormel played a cümbüş on Tom Waits' Mule Variations.
- The Hollies' "Stop Stop Stop"
- Guitarist/multi-instrumentalist Eenor played a modified tambur-cümbüş (Jim Bush) for Les Claypool's side project Colonel Les Claypool's Fearless Flying Frog Brigade on "Shattering Song" (Live Frogs Set 1) as well as on "The Buzzards of Green Hill" (Purple Onion).
- Lu Edmonds played one the 2012 North American Tour of PiL (Public Image Ltd.),, continues to play it with The Mekons as of 2018, and recorded it with Blabbermouth in 2019.

== Musicians ==
- Gevende – cümbüş is played by band member Okan Kaya
- Mısırlı İbrahim Efendi – Jewish late/post-Ottoman ud-ist and composer
- Selahattin Pınar – early 20th-century tanbur player
- Ercüment Batanay – mid-20th-century yaylı tanbur player
- "Kazancı" Bedih Yoluk and son Naci Yoluk – 20th-century folk musicians from Urfa
- Cahit Berkay – in the 1960s "Anatolian rock"; folk-rock hybrid band Moğollar (especially bowed tanbur)
- Yurdal Tokcan – classically trained ud-ist
- Ara Dinkjian – Armenian-American fusion musician
- Harun Tekin in the Turkish rock band Mor ve Ötesi
- David Gilmour- English musician
- Aram Tigran –Armenian-Syrian singer

== See also ==
- Banjo guitar
- Banjo mandolin
- Banjo ukulele
- Oud
