= Dick Parry =

English saxophonist (1942–2026)

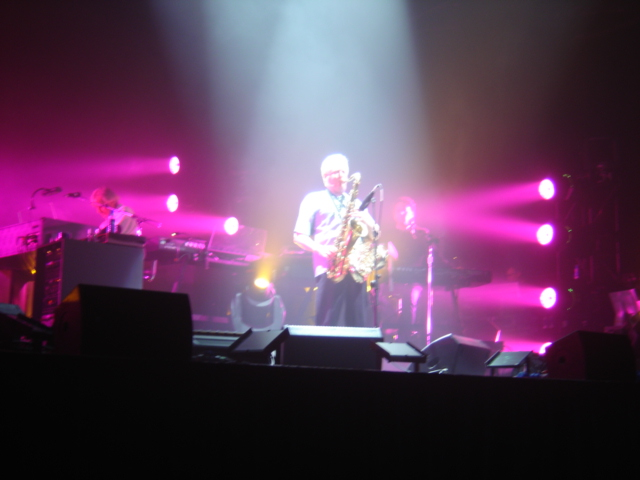
- Parry (middle) with David Gilmour in 2006

Background information
- Born: Richard Parry; 22 December 1942; Kentford, Suffolk, England
- Died: 22 May 2026 (aged 83)
- Occupation: Musician
- Instruments: Saxophone; keyboards
- Years active: 1964–2026

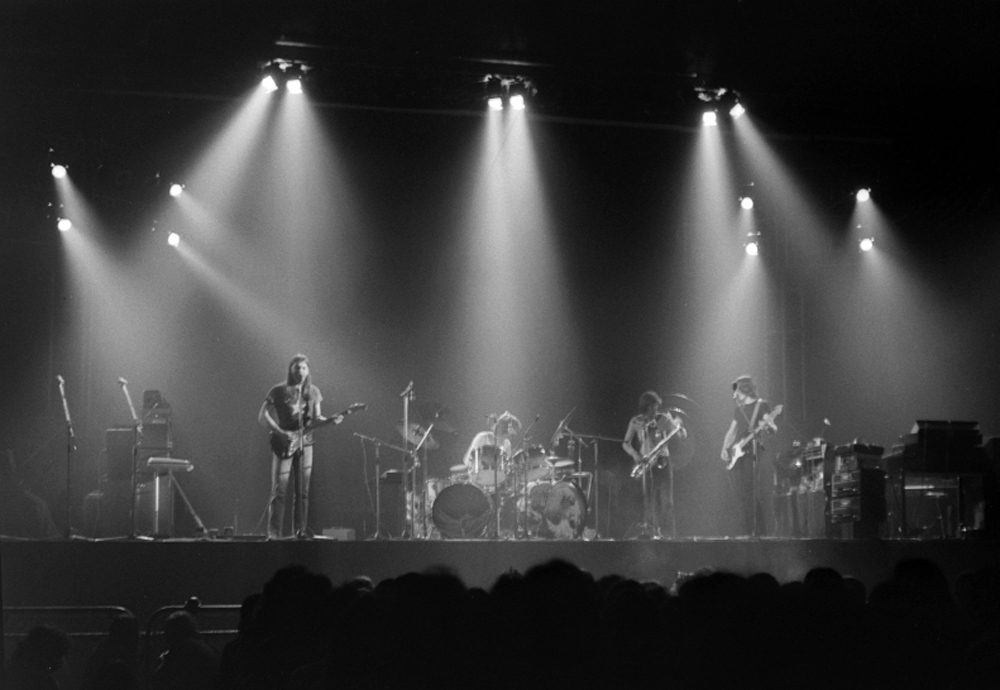
Parry (second from right) playing with Pink Floyd in 1973

Richard Parry (22 December 1942 – 22 May 2026) was an English saxophonist. During his career, he appeared as a session musician on various albums, most notably with Pink Floyd on the songs "Money", "Us and Them", "Shine On You Crazy Diamond" and "Wearing the Inside Out". He also played on the Bloodstone album Riddle of the Sphinx.

== Life and career ==
Born in Kentford, Suffolk on 22 December 1942, Parry started his career as a saxophonist in the Soul Committee, a band based in Cambridge that was active in the mid-1960s. He was a lifelong friend of Pink Floyd guitarist David Gilmour who played in Jokers Wild, another band in Cambridge. Contrary to some reports, Parry did not play in Jokers Wild. Some years later, Gilmour asked him to play on Pink Floyd studio albums, including The Dark Side of the Moon (1973), Wish You Were Here (1975), and The Division Bell (1994), as well as in every Pink Floyd live performance between 1973 and 1977, and the 1994 world tour. Parry also played additional keyboards during Shine On You Crazy Diamond Parts I, VI and IX on Pink Floyd's 1977 In the Flesh Tour. He also toured as part of the Who's brass section on their 1979–1980 tours.

Parry played saxophone on "Celestine" for the 1997 album Big Men Cry by Banco de Gaia.

He appeared on Gilmour's live dates in 2001 and 2002, one performance of which was released as David Gilmour in Concert. He also played on the 2006 On An Island tour in Europe, the United States and Canada, performing saxophone on "Shine On You Crazy Diamond", "Wearing the Inside Out", and "Then I Close My Eyes". Shows from the Royal Albert Hall in London, and from the Shipyard in Gdańsk, Poland were released as the DVDs Remember That Night and Live in Gdańsk, respectively. Parry also played glass harmonica and additional keyboards on this tour.

Parry appeared at the Pink Floyd reunion at Live 8, where he played his saxophone part on "Money". In 2009, he toured Europe and South Africa with the Violent Femmes.

== Death ==
Parry died on 22 May 2026, aged 83.

== Selected discography as saxophonist ==
- 1970: J. J. Jackson's Dilemma – J. J. Jackson
- 1970: ...and proud of it! – J.J. Jackson
- 1971: Quiver – Quiver
- 1971: Bring It Back Home – Mike Vernon with Rory Gallagher and Pete Wingfield
- 1972: Let's Make Up and Be Friendly – Bonzo Dog Doo-Dah Band
- 1972: Transatlantic – Jimmy Dawkins
- 1972: Mick the Lad – Mick Grabham (Procol Harum)
- 1972: London Gumbo – Lightnin' Slim
- 1973: The Dark Side of the Moon – Pink Floyd (on "Money" and "Us and Them")
- 1973: I'm the Worst Partner I Know – Kazimierz Lux
- 1973: Urban Cowboy – Andy Roberts (on the track "Elaine")
- 1974: First of the Big Bands – Tony Ashton and Jon Lord
- 1974: Riddle of the Sphinx – Bloodstone
- 1975: Wish You Were Here – Pink Floyd (on "Shine On You Crazy Diamond (Part V)")
- 1975: Mad Dog – John Entwistle (The Who)
- 1975: Live 1971–1975 – Les Humphries Singers
- 1975: Love Is a Five Letter Word – Jimmy Witherspoon
- 1975: Fingertips – Duster Bennett
- 1982: Jinx – Rory Gallagher
- 1993: BBC Radio One Live in Concert – Paice Ashton Lord
- 1994: The Division Bell – Pink Floyd ("Wearing the Inside Out")
- 1995: Pulse – Pink Floyd
- 1998: Big Men Cry – Banco de Gaia (on the track "Celestine")
- 2002: David Gilmour in Concert – David Gilmour (Pink Floyd) – DVD
- 2007: Remember That Night – David Gilmour (Pink Floyd) -– DVD (Parry also played additional keyboards)
- 2008: Live in Gdańsk – David Gilmour (Pink Floyd) – DVD (Parry also played the glass harmonica and additional keyboards)
- 2008: Duchess – Deborah Bonham
- 2023: The Dark Side of the Moon Live at Wembley 1974 – Pink Floyd
