= Shine On You Crazy Diamond =

- The single edit of Part I

Composition by Pink Floyd

from the album Wish You Were Here
- Published: Pink Floyd Music Publishers Ltd
- Released: 12 September 1975
- Recorded: 13 January – 28 July 1975 ("Wine Glasses" on 5 January 1971)
- Studio: Abbey Road (Studio One, Two and Three)
- Genre: Progressive rock; art rock; space rock
- Length: 25:57 (all parts); 13:33 (parts I–V); 12:24 (parts VI–IX); 18:54 Early Instrumental Version; 17:32 (Echoes: The Best of Pink Floyd version); 11:05 (The Best of Pink Floyd: A Foot in the Door version); 10:41 (A Collection of Great Dance Songs version); 3:53 (single edit); 25:25 (all parts 2025 version)
- Label: Harvest (UK); Columbia/CBS (US)
- Composers: David Gilmour; Richard Wright; Roger Waters
- Lyricist: Roger Waters
- Producer: Pink Floyd

"Shine On You Crazy Diamond" is a nine-part composition by the English rock band Pink Floyd for their 1975 album Wish You Were Here. It was mostly written by David Gilmour and Richard Wright with lyrics by Roger Waters, and first performed on Pink Floyd's 1974 French tour. The song is written about the Pink Floyd founder member Syd Barrett, who left in 1968 following mental health problems.

== Background ==
The song originated in a riff composed by guitarist David Gilmour and developed by Gilmour, bassist Roger Waters and keyboardist Richard Wright. It was conceived and written as a tribute to Pink Floyd founder member Syd Barrett.

Barrett was eased out of the band in 1968 because of his substance abuse and deteriorating mental health which impaired his ability to integrate with the other band members in creating and performing music. He was replaced by his former school friend Gilmour, who had initially been brought in as second guitarist. The remaining members of the band felt guilty about having removed him, but although they admired Barrett's creativity they were concerned about his severe mental decline, and felt it had been necessary. "Shine on You Crazy Diamond" was first performed on Pink Floyd's 1974 French tour and was recorded for their 1975 concept album Wish You Were Here. The track was originally intended to be a side-long composition, like "Atom Heart Mother" and "Echoes", but was ultimately split into two parts and used to bookend the album, with other newly composed material acting as a bridge. The split reflected the "fractured self" which the band members had to witness guitarist Syd Barrett struggling with. The song mentioned themes of stardom, drug addiction and misuse while in the search of purpose and truth, and psychotic behaviour.

The originally planned one-side edit of the song was eventually restored and remixed by James Guthrie in 2025 for the 50th anniversary edition of Wish You Were Here, marking the first time a complete version of all nine parts combined had been officially released.

== Recording ==
Bassist Roger Waters commented, as the sessions were underway, that "at times the group was there only physically. Our bodies were there, but our minds and feelings somewhere else." Eventually an idea was raised to split the song in two, Parts I–V and Parts VI–IX.

According to Gilmour and drummer Nick Mason, Pink Floyd recorded a satisfactory take of "Shine On You Crazy Diamond" but because of a new mixing console which was installed at Abbey Road Studios, it needed to be re-recorded as excessive 'bleed' from other instruments could be heard on the drum tracks. As explained by Gilmour,

We originally did the backing track over the course of several days, but we came to the conclusion that it just wasn't good enough. So we did it again in one day flat and got it a lot better. Unfortunately nobody understood the desk properly and when we played it back we found that someone had switched the echo returns from monitors to tracks one and two. That affected the tom-toms and guitars and keyboards which were playing along at the time. There was no way of saving it, so we just had to do it yet again.

On part 3, a piano part seems to have been added to the final mix, making it absent from multitrack masters. That part was re-recorded at British Grove Studios by Wright during the multi-channel mix used for the album Immersion Edition and the SACD release.

Nick Mason said:

With the invention of 16-track and 2-inch tape there was the belief for quite a while that there would be something wrong with editing tape that big. Consequently whenever we played these pieces, they had to be played from beginning to end. Particularly for Roger [Waters] and myself being the rhythm section, which would be laid down first, this was [chuckling] a fairly tough business because the whole thing had to be sort of right.

The song was the first started and the last recorded for the album. On 24 February, a sequence that was titled "Wine Glasses" was overdubbed onto part 1 of the song, named after the use of wine glasses to record it. The sequence was recorded on 5 January 1971 and was originally intended to be a part of a series of musical experiments titled "Nothings".

== Barrett's studio visit ==
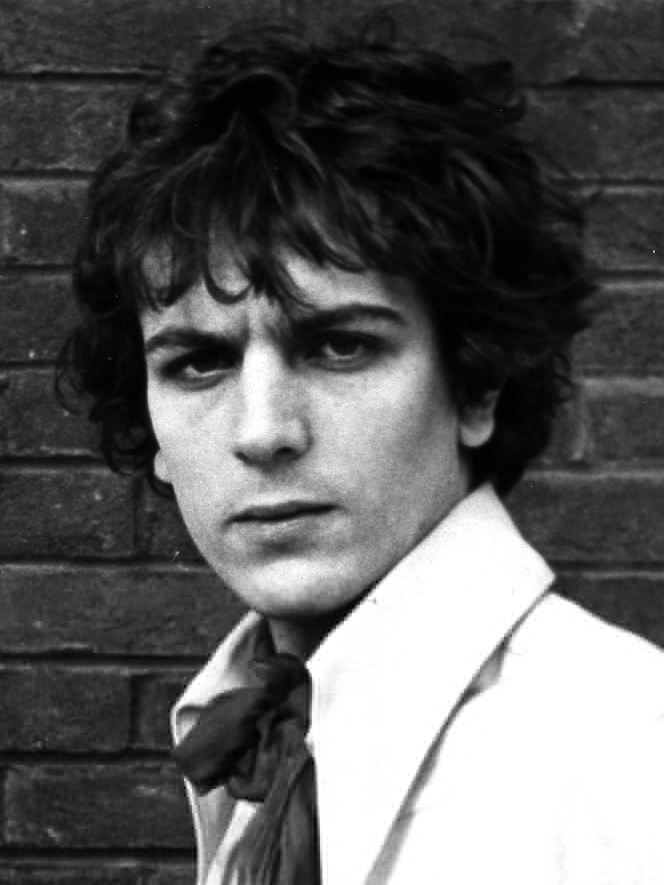
Syd Barrett pictured with Pink Floyd in 1967 (left) and during his unannounced studio visit in 1975 (right). His drastically changed appearance made it so the band did not initially recognize him.

On 5 June 1975, Barrett, by this point heavyset, with a completely shaved head and eyebrows, wandered into the studio where the band were recording. They did not recognise him for some time because of his drastically changed appearance, but when they eventually realised who the withdrawn man in the corner was, Roger Waters became so distressed about Barrett's appearance that he was reduced to tears. Someone asked to play the suite again for Barrett and he said a second playback was not needed when they had just heard it. When asked what he thought of the song, Barrett said it sounded a "bit old". He subsequently slipped away during celebrations for Gilmour's wedding to Ginger Hasenbein, which took place later that day. Gilmour confirmed this story, although he could not recall which composition they were working on when Barrett showed up. Mason has also stated that he is not certain whether "Shine On You Crazy Diamond" was the piece being recorded when Barrett was there.

The episode is related by Wright as follows:

Roger was there, and he was sitting at the desk, and I came in and I saw this guy sitting behind him – huge, bald, fat guy. I thought, "He looks a bit... strange..." Anyway, so I sat down with Roger at the desk and we worked for about ten minutes, and this guy kept on getting up and brushing his teeth and then sitting – doing really weird things, but keeping quiet. And I said to Roger, "Who is he?" and Roger said "I don't know." And I said "Well, I assumed he was a friend of yours," and he said "No, I don't know who he is." Anyway, it took me a long time, and then suddenly I realised it was Syd, after maybe 45 minutes. He came in as we were doing the vocals for "Shine On You Crazy Diamond", which was basically about Syd. He just, for some incredible reason picked the very day that we were doing a song which was about him. And we hadn't seen him, I don't think, for two years before. That's what's so incredibly... weird about this guy. And a bit disturbing, as well, I mean, particularly when you see a guy, that you don't, you couldn't recognise him. And then, for him to pick the very day we want to start putting vocals on, which is a song about him. Very strange.

According to Aubrey Powell (designer at the studio Hipgnosis, which produced Pink Floyd's album covers), Barrett had visited the Hipgnosis office earlier that day and asked where the band was recording. It was Powell who directed Barrett to the Abbey Road session.

== Composition ==
As neither the original 1975 vinyl release nor the CD re-release delineate the various parts precisely, the make-up of the parts below is based on a comparison of the recorded timings with the identifications in the published sheet music.

The song is in the key of G natural minor (Aeolian) scale, but with hints of the G Dorian mode with the inclusion of the E (raised sixth) note in various parts throughout, most prominently in the four-note theme in Part II. Gilmour's solos are largely blues-inspired, with a few notes hinting the inclusion of the G melodic minor scale.

=== Parts I–V ===
Part I (Wright, Gilmour; from 0:00 to 3:54) There are no lyrics in Part I. The instrumental begins with a fade-in of a G minor chord created with a wine glass harp and an ARP Solina string synthesizer (recycled from an earlier project known as Household Objects). This is followed by Wright's Minimoog passage which lead into a lengthy, bluesy guitar solo played by Gilmour on a Fender Stratocaster (neck pickup) using a heavily compressed sound and reverb. Part I ends with the synthesizer chord fading into the background.

Part II (Gilmour, Wright; from 3:54 to 6:27) begins with a four-note theme (B♭, F, G [below the B♭], E), known informally as "Syd's theme", repeated throughout much of the entire section. This theme leads the harmony to C major (in comparison to the use of C minor in Part I). Mason starts his drumming and Waters his bass playing after the fourth playing of the four-note theme, which is the point where the riffs get into a fixed tempo, in 6/8 time. The chord leads back to G minor (as from Part I), followed by E♭ major and D major back to a coda from G minor. This part includes another solo by Gilmour.

Part III (Wright, Gilmour; from 6:27 to 8:41) begins with a Minimoog solo by Wright accompanied by a less complex variation of Mason's drums from Part II. This part includes Gilmour's third guitar solo, in the G natural minor scale, and ends with a fade into Part IV. When performed on the Animals tour, Gilmour added distortion to the guitar for this solo. This solo is often dropped in live performances while the rest of part III is still played—notably on Delicate Sound of Thunder and Pulse.

Part IV (Gilmour, Wright, Waters; from 8:41 to 11:08) Waters sings his lyrics, with Gilmour, Wright and backing vocalists Venetta Fields and Carlena Williams on harmonies.

Part V (Gilmour, Waters, Wright; from 11:08 to 13:33) Part IV is followed by two guitars repeating an arpeggio variation on the main theme for about a minute with the theme of Part II. A baritone saxophone overlays the sounds, played by Dick Parry. The saxophone changes from a baritone to a tenor saxophone, as a time signature switch from 6/8 to 12/8 creates the feeling that the tempo doubles up. The sax solo is accompanied by a Solina string synthesizer keyboard sound. A machine-like hum fades in with musique concrète and segues into "Welcome to the Machine". On later pressings starting with the UK Quad Mix Part V was credited to Waters when on the first pressing and actuality it was written by Gilmour, Wright and Waters (on the first UK/European vinyl and on the label of the 180 Gram Vinyl album Part V is credited to Gilmour, Wright and Waters). The misprint of Waters writing solo has been left on all future CD pressings and inner sleeves of the reissued vinyl.

=== Parts VI–IX ===
Part VI (Gilmour, Wright; from 0:00 to 4:36) begins with a howling wind from the preceding song "Wish You Were Here". In 5 second intervals, two bass notes are played, increasing in volume each time. As the wind fades away, Gilmour comes in on the bass guitar with a continuing riff pattern. Waters adds another bass. Then Wright comes in playing a Solina String Ensemble Synthesizer, and after a few measures, several rhythm guitar parts (Gilmour played the power chord rhythm part using his black Fender Stratocaster before switching to lap steel guitar for the solo in live performances from 1974 to 1977. Snowy White performed the rhythm guitar parts on this track on the band's 1977 In the Flesh Tour) and drums come in, as well as a Minimoog to play the opening solo. At the two-minute mark, Wright's Minimoog and Gilmour's lap steel guitar play notes in unison before Gilmour performs a lap steel guitar solo (the lap steel had open G tuning with the high D string tuned to E) with some counterpointing from Wright's synthesizers. It lasts for about three minutes (four when played on the band's In the Flesh Tour) and Gilmour played each section an octave higher than the previous one. The highest note he hit on the lap steel and slide solo was a B♭_{6}, followed by a reprise of the guitar solo from Part IV (which was played by Wright on synthesizer on the 1975 tour and White on guitar on Pink Floyd's 1977 tour so Gilmour could switch back to his Fender Stratocaster). The song then switches time signatures to 6/8 (found in Parts II–V), giving the appearance of a slower tempo and reintroducing the vocals.

Part VII (Gilmour, Wright, Waters; from 4:36 to 6:05) contains the vocals, in a similar vein to Part IV though half the length, before segueing into Part VIII. Waters again sings the lead vocals with Gilmour, Wright, Fields and Williams providing backing vocals.

Part VIII (Wright, Gilmour, Waters; from 6:05 to 9:03) brings in Waters to play a second electric guitar for a high-noted sound riff while Gilmour plays the arpeggio riff that bridges Parts VII and VIII. A solid progression of funk in 4/4 plays for about two minutes before very slowly fading out as a single sustained keyboard note fades in around the nine-minute mark. Throughout this section, Wright's keyboards dominate, with the use of a Minimoog synthesizer, and a Hohner Clavinet. Originally the section clocked in at 8 minutes before it was edited down to three minutes on the final version (the unedited Part 8 without the electric piano and Minimoog overdubs surfaced on a bootleg called The Extraction Tapes). When performed on the "In the Flesh" tour in 1977, the section would be extended to between 5 and 10 minutes as it would feature guitar solos from Gilmour (which would vary from funky power chords to a proper solo as the Animals tour progressed) and Snowy White. In addition to their guitar solos, there was also occasional trading of leads from Gilmour and White instead of the keyboard sounds as heard on the record.

Part IX (Wright, from 9:03 to 12:24) is played in 4/4 time. Gilmour described Part IX as "a slow 4/4 funeral march... the parting musical eulogy to Syd". Again, Wright's keyboards dominate, with little guitar input from Gilmour. Mason's drums play for much of this part, and the keyboards play for the final minute before fading out. The final notes are a fragment of the melody of "See Emily Play" (at 12:07), one of Barrett's signature Pink Floyd songs. This was the final solo writing credit Wright would receive in Pink Floyd during his lifetime, as well as his last writing credit of any kind until The Division Bell in 1994.

In December 2025, a 50th anniversary edition of Wish You Were Here was released. This edition includes a newly remixed version of "Shine On You Crazy Diamond" (Parts I–IX), presented as a single continuous track for the first time, mixed by James Guthrie.

== Live performances ==
The song series was first performed as "Shine On" during the band's French tour in June 1974. It was introduced as "Shine On You Crazy Diamond" on the British tour in November 1974. The set was originally performed as one whole suite, with some of the parts differing from the album versions, and samplings of Barrett's solo song "Dark Globe" during the opening of the performance. The version from the British tour was included on the 2011 Experience and Immersion editions of Wish You Were Here. The multi-part version of "Shine On You Crazy Diamond" was first performed on the band's 1975 North American tour with "Have a Cigar" in between the two halves of the piece. The 1975 versions were close to the final versions, except parts one and nine were still not refined yet. The band performed the whole nine-part "Shine On You Crazy Diamond" as part of the Wish You Were Here portion of their 1977 In the Flesh Tour, with extra musicians White on guitar and backing vocals and Parry on saxophones and additional keyboards.

Parts I–V became a staple of Floyd's performances from 1987 to 1994. The track (without the Gilmour solo in part III) opened shows for most of the A Momentary Lapse of Reason Tour, including its final performance at Knebworth in 1990 with Candy Dulfer on saxophone. The first eleven performances had "Echoes" as the show opener before the band proceeded to play all of A Momentary Lapse of Reason in the rest of the first half in a slightly different sequence to the album. A condensed edition of the track (again without the Gilmour solo in Part III) would then open the second half of the shows on the group's 1994 The Division Bell Tour, except in shows where all of The Dark Side of the Moon was performed, in which case "Shine On You Crazy Diamond" opened the first half of the concert. In the last month and a half of the tour, the band added part VII to Parts I–V (as documented on the live album Pulse). A similar version was also played during David Gilmour's Rattle That Lock Tour in 2015 with the according screen film on display.

Gilmour performed almost the whole suite (save parts III, VIII and IX) at his 2001 and 2002 semi-unplugged concerts (documented on his 2002 David Gilmour in Concert DVD). "There was," he said, "a moment of thinking, 'Shall I attempt an acoustic guitar version of the long, synthesised opening?' It came to me one day how I could do it, and it worked out not too badly."

Gilmour performed parts I–II and IV–V (in a new arrangement) on his 2006 On an Island concert series. Part III was omitted and Parts I and II were simplified and more guitar-focused. Gilmour performed this version on his Live in Gdańsk album on disc two and on the DVD in the four-disc edition of the album. The five-disc edition and the online downloads available in the three and four-disc editions include this same arrangement recorded in Venice and Vienne in 2006. In many of his performances, solo and with Pink Floyd, Gilmour alters the vocal melody to avoid the higher notes that were originally sung by Waters.

Waters has also performed the epic on his In the Flesh concert series, documented on the live album of the same name which was a condensed parts I, II, IV, VI, VII, and VIII. Part VI on these performances had a lap steel solo from Jon Carin then guitar solos from Doyle Bramhall II and White. Then on Waters' 2002 tour, he played all nine parts like on record (although parts I, VIII and IX were shortened). An abridged version of parts I–V was performed on Waters' 2006–07 The Dark Side of the Moon Live, Waters also performed the song on the 2016 concerts, including the free concert of the Mexico City's Zócalo, and the concert at the Desert Trip festival; besides the parts VI–IX, Waters performed all the Wish You Were Here album live in order. During Waters' This Is Not a Drill, he played the B side of Wish You Were Here in order, including parts VI-VIII (excluding part IX), however part VIII was dropped around halfway through the tour, and replaced with part V. The arrangement of parts VI-VII + part V is documented on the live album and concert film Roger Waters: This Is Not a Drill – Live from Prague.

== Personnel ==
- Roger Waters – bass guitar, lead vocals, additional electric guitar (on Part VIII), glass harp
- David Gilmour – electric guitars, backing vocals, Fender Stringmaster pedal steel guitar, additional bass guitar (on Part VI), EMS Synthi AKS, glass harp
- Richard Wright – Hammond organ, ARP String Ensemble, Minimoog, quadruple-tracked EMS VCS 3, clavinet and electric piano (on Part VIII), Steinway piano (on Parts III, VI and IX), glass harp, backing vocals, Bösendorfer piano on the multi-channel re-release (recorded in 2008).
- Nick Mason – drums, percussion

with:

- Dick Parry – baritone and tenor saxophones
- Carlena Williams – backing vocals
- Venetta Fields – backing vocals

== Releases ==
"Shine On You Crazy Diamond" features on all the below releases:

Albums

- Wish You Were Here (Original release, Parts I–V and VI–IX) – Pink Floyd, 1975
- A Collection of Great Dance Songs (Edited version, Parts I–II, IV, VII) – Pink Floyd, 1981
- Delicate Sound of Thunder (Live version, Parts I–V) – Pink Floyd, 1988
- PULSE (Live version, Parts I–V, VII) – Pink Floyd, 1995
- In the Flesh – Live (Live version, Parts I–II, IV, VI–VIII) – Roger Waters, 2000
- Echoes: The Best of Pink Floyd (Edited version, Parts I–VII) – Pink Floyd, 2001
- Live in Gdańsk (Live version, Parts I–II, IV–V) – David Gilmour, 2008
- Wish You Were Here 2011 remastered "Experience" and "Immersion" sets (Early live version recorded in November 1974) – Pink Floyd, 2011
- A Foot in the Door – The Best of Pink Floyd (Edited version, Parts I–V) – Pink Floyd, 2011
- Live at Pompeii (Live version, Parts I–II, IV–V) – David Gilmour, 2017
- Roger Waters: This Is Not a Drill – Live from Prague (Live version, Parts VI–VII, V) – Roger Waters, 2025
- Wish You Were Here 50 (New stereo mix, Parts I-IX) – Pink Floyd, 2025

Video/DVD/BD

- Delicate Sound of Thunder (VHS, Part I only) – Pink Floyd, 1988
- PULSE (VHS and DVD, Parts I–V, VII) – Pink Floyd, 1995 (VHS) 2006 (DVD)
- In the Flesh – Live (DVD, Parts I–II, IV, VI–VIII) – Roger Waters, 2000
- David Gilmour in Concert (DVD, Parts I–II, IV–V (acoustic) and VI–VII with end of Part V) – David Gilmour, 2002
- Remember That Night (DVD and BD, Parts I–II, IV–V) – David Gilmour, 2007
- Live in Gdańsk 3-disc, 4-disc and deluxe editions (Parts I–II, IV–V) – David Gilmour, 2008
- Live at Pompeii (DVD, BD and deluxe edition, Parts I–II, IV–V) – David Gilmour, 2017
- Roger Waters: This Is Not a Drill – Live from Prague (Live version, Parts VI–VII, V) – Roger Waters, 2025

== Certifications ==
Region	Certification	Certified units/sales
Italy (FIMI) Parts I–V	Gold	50,000^{‡}
New Zealand (RMNZ) Parts I–V	Platinum	30,000^{‡}
United Kingdom (BPI) Parts I–V	Silver	200,000^{‡}
^{‡} Sales+streaming figures based on certification alone.

== Use in other media ==
In December 2018, the song was the subject of an episode of BBC Radio 4's Soul Music, examining its cultural influence, including an interview with Gilmour about how the song was created.
