= Metallic Spheres =

2010 studio album by the Orb featuring David Gilmour

Studio album by the Orb featuring David Gilmour
- Released: 12 October 2010
- Recorded: 2009
- Genre: Electronica
- Length: 48:54
- Label: Columbia
- Producer: Martin "Youth" Glover

The Orb albums chronology
Baghdad Batteries (Orbsessions Volume III) (2009)	Metallic Spheres (2010)	The Orbserver in the Star House (2012)

David Gilmour albums chronology
Live in Gdańsk (2008)	Metallic Spheres (2010)	Rattle That Lock (2015)

Metallic Spheres is the tenth studio album by the ambient techno group the Orb, released in October 2010. It features the Pink Floyd guitarist David Gilmour and the Killing Joke bassist Youth. It spent three weeks on the UK charts, reaching number 12. In 2023, the album was remixed, partially re-recorded and released as Metallic Spheres in Colour.

== Production ==
The album came about after David Gilmour released an online single, "Chicago - Change the World" (a re-titled cover of the Graham Nash song "Chicago"), in support of Gary McKinnon. It was remixed by the Orb, who asked if Gilmour would provide some extra guitar parts. These were recorded in one day in June, 2009, at Youth's Wandsworth studio, the Dreaming Cave, resulting in a 25-minute track. Youth and the Orb expanded this to the eventual album.

It was produced by Youth and engineered by Tim Bran (of Dreadzone) and David Nock. Mixing was done by Youth, with mix engineering from Bran, Nock and Michael Rendall at "The Study" in 2010. Mastering was done by Andy Baldwin at Metropolis Studios in London. A headphone version was released as the second disc of the deluxe 2-CD edition, with sound design by Mike Brady, recording by Mike Brady, David Nock and Michael Rendall, and mixing by Youth.

== Track listing ==
Professional ratings
Aggregate scores
Source	Rating
AnyDecentMusic?	6.3/10
Metacritic	72/100
Review scores
Source	Rating
AllMusic	3/5 stars
The A.V. Club	C+
Mojo	4/5 stars
Now	4/5 stars
Pitchfork	7.0/10
PopMatters	6/10
Q	4/5 stars
Slant Magazine	4/5 stars
Spin	5/10
Uncut	4/5 stars

1. "Metallic Side" (28:42)
  1. "Metallic Spheres"
  2. "Hymns to the Sun"
  3. "Black Graham"
  4. "Hiding in Plain View"
  5. "Classified"
2. "Spheres Side" (20:12)
  1. "Es Vedra"
  2. "Hymns to the Sun (reprise)"
  3. "Olympic"
  4. "Chicago Dub"
  5. "Bold Knife Trophy"
3. "Cult of Youth Ambient Mix (Parts 1 & 2)" (Edit) (5:35) (iTunes-only bonus track)

All tracks written by David Gilmour, Alex Paterson, and Youth, except:

- "Hymns to the Sun" written by Gilmour, Paterson, Youth, and Graham Nash
- "Black Graham" written by Gilmour, Paterson, Youth, and Marcia Mello
- "Hiding in Plain View" written by Gilmour, Paterson, Youth, and Tim Bran

== Personnel ==
- David Gilmour – guitars, vocals
- Alex Paterson – sound manipulation, keyboards, turntables
- Youth – bass, keyboards, programming
- Tim Bran – keyboards, programming
- Marcia Mello – acoustic guitar (on "Black Graham")
- Dominique Le Vac – backing vocals

== Charts ==
Chart performance for Metallic Spheres
Chart (2010)	Peak position
Belgian Albums (Ultratop Flanders)	58
Belgian Albums (Ultratop Wallonia)	34
Dutch Albums (Album Top 100)	40
Greek Albums (IFPI Greece)	21
German Albums (Offizielle Top 100)	95
Irish Albums (IRMA)	65
Italian Albums (FIMI)	51
Scottish Albums (Official Charts)	13
UK Albums (Official Charts)	12
UK Dance Albums (Official Charts)	3
