= David Gilmour in Concert =

2002 David Gilmour concert DVD

Video by David Gilmour
- Released: October 2002 (UK); November 2002 (US)
- Recorded: 22 June 2001 and January 2002
- Venue: Royal Festival Hall (London)
- Genre: Acoustic soft rock, folk rock, progressive rock
- Length: 92 min. (concert footage), 2 hours (concert plus extras)
- Label: EMI (UK); Capitol Records (US)
- Director: David Mallet
- Producer: David Gilmour

David Gilmour video chronology
David Gilmour Live 1984 (1984)	David Gilmour in Concert (2002)	Remember That Night (2007)

David Gilmour in Concert is a DVD of Pink Floyd guitarist David Gilmour's solo concert that took place at the Royal Festival Hall, London in June 2001, as part of the Robert Wyatt-curated Meltdown festival. It also features footage filmed during three concerts at the same venue in January 2002. The track selection includes several Pink Floyd songs, in addition to Gilmour's solo works. Guest appearances are made by Floyd colleague Richard Wright, as well as Robert Wyatt and Bob Geldof. It includes the first performance of "Smile", a track that would appear almost five years later on Gilmour's third solo album, On an Island. Gilmour also plays two Syd Barrett songs.

Also included is "Je crois entendre encore" ("I still believe I hear") – an aria from Georges Bizet's opera Les pêcheurs de perles (The Pearl Fishers) – with a libretto by Eugène Cormon and Michel Carré. Sung by Gilmour in the original French. "I remember my wife Polly's face going red when I tried singing it," he recalled, "and my face literally going into a cold sweat – 'Do I dare try this?' But once the choir came up here [Gilmour's studio] and ran through it with me, that gave me a huge amount of confidence."

== Track listing ==
=== The Meltdown Concert from June 2001 ===
1. "Shine On You Crazy Diamond (Parts I–II, IV–V)" (David Gilmour, Roger Waters, Richard Wright)
2. "Terrapin" (Syd Barrett)
3. "Fat Old Sun" (Gilmour)
4. "Coming Back to Life" (Gilmour)
5. "High Hopes" (Gilmour, Polly Samson)
6. "Je crois entendre encore" (Georges Bizet)
7. "Smile" (Gilmour, Samson)
8. "Wish You Were Here" (Gilmour, Waters)
9. "Comfortably Numb" (with Robert Wyatt) (Gilmour, Waters)
10. "Dimming of the Day" (Richard Thompson)
11. "Shine On You Crazy Diamond (Parts VI–VII, ending from Part V)" (Gilmour, Waters, Wright)
12. "A Great Day for Freedom" (Gilmour, Samson)
13. "Hushabye Mountain" (Robert B. Sherman, Richard M. Sherman)

=== Royal Festival Hall Concert 2002 ===
14. "Dominoes" (Barrett)
15. "Breakthrough" (with Richard Wright) (Wright, Anthony Moore)
16. "Comfortably Numb" (with Bob Geldof) (Gilmour, Waters)

== Personnel ==
- David Gilmour – guitars, vocals
- Neill MacColl – guitars, backing vocals
- Michael Kamen – piano, English horn
- Chucho Merchán – double bass
- Caroline Dale – cello
- Dick Parry – baritone and tenor saxophones
- Nic France – drums & percussion
- Gospel Choir – Sam Brown (choir leader), Chris Ballin, Pete Brown, Margo Buchanan, Claudia Fontaine, Michelle John Douglas, Sonia Jones, Carol Kenyon, David Laudat, Durga McBroom, Aitch McRobbie (solo on Smile), Beverly Skeete

with

- Bob Geldof – vocals on "Comfortably Numb" (January 2002 footage)
- Robert Wyatt – vocals on "Comfortably Numb" (June 2001 footage)
- Richard Wright – vocals on "Breakthrough", keyboards on "Breakthrough" and "Comfortably Numb"

== Special features ==
The 30 minutes of special features on the DVD include the tracks "I Put a Spell on You" (from Later with Jools Holland from June 1992), "Don't" (from a Leiber-Stoller Tribute concert from June 2001), and a performance of Shakespeare's Sonnet 18 (recorded on Gilmour's houseboat The Astoria). Additionally, there is a version of "High Hopes" performed by Gilmour's backing vocalists. Finally, there are lyrics, a home movie of the band and choir rehearsing at home, and a 'Spare Digits' feature - a camera on Gilmour's fretboards during six guitar solos.

== Quotes ==
I can show you places where the nerves are there. At the beginning of 'Shine On You Crazy Diamond', there's a closeup of me doing a vibrato on the acoustic guitar which is more than I'd ever intended. That was due to trembling. It wasn't as under control as one would like it to be.

— David Gilmour, 2002

How did you go about choosing the material for the shows? I went through the entire Pink Floyd catalogue, and I picked the tunes I liked. Then, after I figured out which ones would work with the instrumentation I had in mind, I spent about three months fiddling around in my home studio mocking up the arrangements.

— David Gilmour, 2003

== Charts ==
=== Weekly charts ===
Chart performance for David Gilmour in Concert
Chart (2002–09)	Peak position
Argentine Music DVD (CAPIF)	20
Dutch Music DVD (MegaCharts)	10
New Zealand Music DVD (RMNZ)	2
Portuguese Music DVD (AFP)	14
US Music Videos (Billboard)	6

== Certifications ==
Certifications for David Gilmour in Concert
Region	Certification	Certified units/sales
Argentina (CAPIF)	Platinum	8,000^{^}
France (SNEP)	Platinum	20,000^{*}
Germany (BVMI)	Gold	25,000^{^}
New Zealand (RMNZ)	3× Platinum	15,000^{^}
Poland (ZPAV)	Gold	5,000^{*}
Portugal (AFP)	Platinum	8,000^{^}
United Kingdom (BPI)	Platinum	50,000^{*}
^{*} Sales figures based on certification alone.^{^} Shipments figures based on certification alone.
