= David Gilmour Live 1984 =

1984 David Gilmour concert film

Pink Floyd's David Gilmour

Video by David Gilmour
- Released: September 1984
- Recorded: 30 April 1984
- Venue: Hammersmith Odeon (London)
- Genre: Progressive rock
- Length: 100 min.
- Label: CBS-Fox
- Director: Michael Hurll
- Producer: Norman Stone

David Gilmour video chronology
David Gilmour Live 1984 (1984)	David Gilmour in Concert (2002)

Pink Floyd's David Gilmour or simply David Gilmour is a film by David Gilmour from his 1984 tour from the album About Face for Europe.

The film is mainly a concert performance from The Hammersmith Odeon in London in April 1984, and also features promotional clips.

A documentary called Beyond The Floyd which followed Gilmour on the 1984 solo tour includes interviews with David on tour buses (the bus driver refers to David as ex-guitarist of Pink Floyd) and in hotel rooms. Also included is more live footage of concerts and soundchecks in Europe. It is now out of production.

The VHS was not released in Europe, apparently due to "lack of commercial interest". This concert footage is now to be found on DVD, released by Crime Crow Productions. The DVD, however, does not contain the extra footage that could be found on the VHS.

Similarly, Sony Music has shown little interest in releasing the title on DVD in the US, possibly due to the age of the concert as well as Gilmour's own mixed feelings about About Face as an album.

== Track listing ==
=== David Gilmour In Concert (Hammersmith Odeon, 30 April 1984) ===
1. "Until We Sleep" (David Gilmour)
2. "All Lovers Are Deranged" (Gilmour, Pete Townshend)
3. "There's No Way Out of Here" (Ken Baker)
4. "Short and Sweet" (Gilmour, Roy Harper)
5. "Run Like Hell" (Gilmour, Roger Waters)
6. "Out of the Blue" (Gilmour)
7. "Blue Light" (Gilmour)
8. "Murder" (Gilmour)
9. "Comfortably Numb" (Gilmour, Waters)

=== Videos ===
1. "Blue Light"
2. "All Lovers Are Deranged"

=== Documentary ===
1. Beyond The Floyd

== Personnel ==
- David Gilmour: guitars, vocals
- Mick Ralphs: guitars, vocals
- Mickey Feat: bass, vocals
- Raphael "Raff" Ravenscroft: saxophone, keyboards, percussion
- Gregg Dechert: keyboards, vocals
- Chris Slade: drums, percussion
- Jody Linscott: percussion
- Roy Harper: vocals (on "Short and Sweet"), percussion (on "Comfortably Numb")
- Nick Mason: drums (on "Comfortably Numb")
