= Love and Anger =

Love and Anger may refer to:

- "Love and Anger" (song), a 1989 song by Kate Bush
- Love and Anger (film), a 1969 anthology film
- Love and Anger (play), a 1989 play by George F. Walker
