= Fat Old Sun =

1970 song by Pink Floyd

Song by Pink Floyd

from the album Atom Heart Mother
- Published: Lupus Music
- Released: 2 October 1970 (UK); 10 October 1970 (US)
- Recorded: 11–13 June 1970 (mixed on 5 July 1970)
- Studio: Abbey Road Studios, London
- Genre: Psychedelic folk; psychedelic rock; progressive rock
- Length: 5:24
- Label: Harvest
- Songwriter: David Gilmour
- Producers: Pink Floyd, Norman Smith (executive producer)

Official audio
- "Fat Old Sun" on YouTube

"Fat Old Sun" is a song by English rock band Pink Floyd, written and sung by David Gilmour. It appears on their 1970 album Atom Heart Mother, and was performed live by the group from 1970–71 in a different arrangement. Gilmour has since played the track on all of his solo tours since 2006.

== Recording ==
Gilmour said the song was one of the first he wrote. He played most of the instruments on the studio recording, including acoustic and electric guitars, bass guitar and drums. Richard Wright was the only other group member to perform on the track, contributing organ.

Recording took place at Abbey Road Studios. The basic series of backing tracks were recorded on 11 June, with further overdubs happening over the next two days. A stock sound effect of bells was added to the start and end of the track; the same recording had been used for the Kinks' 1966 song "Big Black Smoke".

== Live performances ==
"Fat Old Sun" was performed live by Pink Floyd from 1970–71 on the Atom Heart Mother World Tour. On stage, the song was expanded and given a full electric arrangement in contrast to the acoustic-based studio recording, sometimes lasting as long as fifteen minutes. It was dropped from the live set when The Dark Side of the Moon began to be performed in 1972.

Pink Floyd performed the track for two BBC In Concert recordings at the Paris Theatre. These were later released on the box set The Early Years 1965–1972.

The song was adopted by David Gilmour and performed acoustically in the 2001/02 David Gilmour in Concert shows, minus the electric guitar solo. When the Floyd's manager, Steve O'Rourke, died in 2003, Gilmour, Wright and Nick Mason played "Fat Old Sun" and "The Great Gig in the Sky" at O'Rourke's funeral. Early during the tour in support of Gilmour's On an Island album in 2006, the song returned to the set list. This incarnation was composed of the lyrics followed by the concert's backing singers repeating the "sing to me" chorus, then a bluesy version of the guitar solo closer to the length of the album version (the 2006 incarnation clocked in at around seven minutes). A performance from the Royal Albert Hall is featured on Gilmour's DVD, Remember That Night. It is also featured on Gilmour's live album Live in Gdańsk. "Fat Old Sun" was performed during Gilmour's 2015–16 Rattle That Lock Tour and features on his 2017 live release, Live at Pompeii. Gilmour also performed the song at Richard Thompson's 70th birthday concert in September 2019. In 2024, the song was resurrected once again by Gilmour for his Luck and Strange tour. Since 2015, Gilmour has added jazzy organ solo to all performances of the song between the final verse and the guitar solo.

== Reception ==
In a review for the Atom Heart Mother album, Alec Dubro of Rolling Stone gave "Fat Old Sun" a negative review, calling the song "English folk at its deadly worst. It's soft and silly." Dubro said the same for "If". In another review for Atom Heart Mother, Irving Tan of Sputnik Music described "Fat Old Sun" as unmemorable. While Tan enjoyed "If", he described "Fat Old Sun" as too similar to "If", further describing that "on an album with only five songs, that becomes quickly noticeable."

== More information ==
This song was considered for the album Echoes: The Best of Pink Floyd (2001), as mooted by James Guthrie, the compilation's producer. "I wasn't allowed to put it on Echoes," Gilmour explained. "I was outvoted." The guitarist repeated this on Johnnie Walker's Radio 2 drivetime show in 2002. Atom Heart Mother is, consequently, unrepresented on Echoes.

"Fat Old Sun" is perhaps best described as a pastoral, a hymn of praise to the countryside (as were several early Pink Floyd songs, such as "Grantchester Meadows" from Ummagumma and "Green Is the Colour" from More). The bell sounds heard at the beginning and the end of the song were later used again in "High Hopes" from their album The Division Bell and in "Surfacing" from their album The Endless River.

== Personnel ==
- David Gilmour – lead vocals, electric guitar, acoustic guitar, pedal steel guitar, bass guitar, drums, percussion
- Richard Wright – Farfisa organ, Hammond organ
