= Castellorizon =

Song by David Gilmour

Instrumental by David Gilmour

from the album On an Island
- Released: 6 March 2006
- Genre: Progressive rock
- Length: 3:54
- Label: EMI (UK); Columbia Records (U.S.)
- Songwriter(s): David Gilmour
- Producer(s): David Gilmour; Phil Manzanera; Chris Thomas

On an Island track listing
- 10 tracks: 1. "Castellorizon"; 2. "On an Island"; 3. "The Blue"; 4. "Take a Breath"; 5. "Red Sky at Night"; 6. "This Heaven"; 7. "Then I Close My Eyes"; 8. "Smile"; 9. "A Pocketful of Stones"; 10. "Where We Start"

"Castellorizon" is the opening track on David Gilmour's third solo album, On an Island. It is an instrumental guitar solo, which starts off with an overture of various sounds from other tracks of the album before the guitar is introduced. The song is based on a night Gilmour spent on the Greek island of Kastellorizo. It segues into "On an Island", the title track. The song received a nomination for Best Rock Instrumental Performance at the 49th Grammy Awards. The song was nominated for the same Grammy Award again at the 51st Grammy Awards for a performance from Gilmour's Live in Gdańsk album.
