= Smile (David Gilmour song) =

Single by David Gilmour

from the album On an Island
- B-side: "Island Jam"
- Released: 13 June 2006
- Recorded: 2001
- Genre: Progressive rock, art rock
- Length: 4:03
- Label: EMI (UK); Columbia Records (US)
- Songwriter(s): David Gilmour; Polly Samson
- Producer(s): David Gilmour (Smile/Island Jam); Phil Manzanera (Smile); Chris Thomas (Smile)

David Gilmour singles chronology
"On an Island" (2006)	"Smile" (2006)	"Arnold Layne" (2006)

On an Island track listing
- 10 tracks: 1. "Castellorizon"; 2. "On an Island"; 3. "The Blue"; 4. "Take a Breath"; 5. "Red Sky at Night"; 6. "This Heaven"; 7. "Then I Close My Eyes"; 8. "Smile"; 9. "A Pocketful of Stones"; 10. "Where We Start"

"Smile" is a single by guitarist and vocalist David Gilmour, released on 13 June 2006. The song was on the UK charts for 1 week and peaked at 72.

== Live ==
The song was first performed at Gilmour's 2001 and 2002 live shows (and also on the accompanying DVD) where Gilmour introduced it as: "This is a new one so if you are bootlegging, start your machines now." It was eventually recorded at his houseboat studio, the Astoria, for the 2006 album On an Island. The song is in 3/4 time.

During the three nights at the Royal Albert Hall during his On an Island Tour in 2006, empty CD wallets bearing the Smile single cover, and a CD-sticker were left on seats of audience members who would discover them on arrival, each one bearing a unique number. The idea was to download the single from iTunes, burn it to a CD-R, place the CD-shaped sticker onto the burnt CD and keep it in the wallet.

"Island Jam" was initially available via Gilmour's website before being made more widely available.

An unmastered form of "Smile" can be heard briefly on the BBC2 show Three Men in a Boat which retraced a trip on the River Thames, and visited the houseboat.

== Track list ==
1. "Smile" (David Gilmour/Polly Samson) – 4:03
2. "Island Jam" (Gilmour) - 6:33

== Personnel ==
"Smile"

- David Gilmour - guitars, vocals, bass guitar, piano, slide guitar, percussion, Hammond organ
- Polly Samson - backing vocals
- Willie Wilson - drums
- Zbigniew Preisner - orchestration

"Island Jam"

- David Gilmour - guitar
- Guy Pratt - bass guitar
- Ged Lynch - drums
- Paul "Wix" Wickens - Hammond organ
