= This Heaven =

Promotional single by David Gilmour

from the album On an Island
- Released: October 2006
- Genre: Progressive rock
- Length: 4:25
- Label: EMI (UK); Columbia Records (US)
- Songwriter(s): David Gilmour; Polly Samson
- Producer(s): David Gilmour; Phil Manzanera; Chris Thomas

On an Island track listing
- 10 tracks: 1. "Castellorizon"; 2. "On an Island"; 3. "The Blue"; 4. "Take a Breath"; 5. "Red Sky at Night"; 6. "This Heaven"; 7. "Then I Close My Eyes"; 8. "Smile"; 9. "A Pocketful of Stones"; 10. "Where We Start"

"This Heaven" is a song written and recorded by former Pink Floyd lead singer and guitarist, David Gilmour. It is included as the sixth track from his third studio album, and his first post-Pink Floyd solo album, On an Island. It was one of two songs released in the US as promotional CD-Rs in October 2006. The song, along with the entire album, was performed live during Gilmour's 2006 On an Island tour.

== Track listing ==
US Promotional CD-R
No.	Title	Length
1.	"This Heaven"	4:25
2.	"This Heaven (edit)"	3:56
