= Take a Breath (song) =

Promotional single by David Gilmour

from the album On an Island
- Released: 3 March 2006 (Vinyl) October 2006 (CD-R)
- Genre: Progressive rock
- Length: 5:46
- Label: EMI (UK); Columbia Records (US)
- Songwriter(s): David Gilmour; Polly Samson
- Producer(s): David Gilmour; Phil Manzanera; Chris Thomas

On an Island track listing
- 10 tracks: 1. "Castellorizon"; 2. "On an Island"; 3. "The Blue"; 4. "Take a Breath"; 5. "Red Sky at Night"; 6. "This Heaven"; 7. "Then I Close My Eyes"; 8. "Smile"; 9. "A Pocketful of Stones"; 10. "Where We Start"

"Take a Breath" is a song written and recorded by David Gilmour, the former lead guitarist of the British rock band Pink Floyd. The song is included as the fourth track from his third studio album, On an Island.

Gilmour co-wrote the track with his wife, Polly Samson. As he revealed during a promotional interview for the album with Matthew Evans, the lyrics for the song exploit the theme of water (which runs through the whole album) and, in this case, being pulled underwater and drowning - both intended as symbols of man's mortality.

Along with "This Heaven", also on On an Island, it was released in the US as a promotional CD-R in October 2006. The song was performed live during Gilmour's 2006 On an Island tour, although it was performed in a different order to the album, played as the eighth song in the album set instead of fourth.

In 2007, the song was released in special promotional 7" singles, along with selected songs from On an Island, such as "Smile", "This Heaven", "A Pocketful of Stones", and "On an Island"

== Track listing ==
US Promotional CD-R
No.	Title	Length
1.	"Take a Breath"	5:46
2.	"Take a Breath (Live from the AOL Sessions, New York, April 2006)"	6:44

7" Promotional
No.	Title	Length
1.	"Take a Breath (Radio edit)"	3:36
