= On an Island =

Studio album by David Gilmour
- Released: 6 March 2006
- Recorded: 2001–05
- Studios: Astoria (Hampton); David Gilmour's farm (Sussex); British Grove Studios (London); Abbey Road Studios (London)
- Genres: Post-progressive; art rock; baroque pop; ambient
- Length: 51:36
- Labels: EMI (UK); Columbia Records (US)
- Producers: David Gilmour; Phil Manzanera; Chris Thomas

David Gilmour chronology
About Face (1984)	On an Island (2006)	Live in Gdańsk (2008)

Singles from On an Island
- 1. "On an Island" Released: 15 February 2006; 2. "Smile" Released: 13 June 2006

Professional ratings
Aggregate scores
Source	Rating
Metacritic	67/100
Review scores
Source	Rating
AllMusic	3.5/5 stars
Entertainment Weekly	C
The Guardian	3/5 stars
musicOMH	3/5 stars
Mojo	4/5 stars
PopMatters	6/10
Q	4/5 stars
Rolling Stone	2/5 stars
Tiny Mix Tapes	4/5 stars
Uncut	7/10

On an Island is the third solo studio album by Pink Floyd member David Gilmour. It was released in the UK on 6 March 2006, Gilmour's 60th birthday, and in the United States the following day. It was his first solo album in 22 years since About Face in 1984, and was released nearly 12 years after Pink Floyd's at-the-time final 1994 album The Division Bell.

== History ==
The album features Robert Wyatt, Jools Holland, Georgie Fame, David Crosby, Graham Nash, Pink Floyd keyboardist Richard Wright, early Pink Floyd member Bob Klose and Pink Floyd session and touring musician Guy Pratt. Chris Thomas and Roxy Music's Phil Manzanera assisted with production. Engineering duties were undertaken by long-time collaborator Andy Jackson. The lyrics were principally written by Gilmour's wife, writer Polly Samson.

== Recording ==
Much of the album was recorded in Gilmour's private studio aboard his houseboat Astoria. The track "Smile" was heard briefly in an unmastered form on the BBC2 show Three Men in a Boat which retraced a trip on the River Thames that passed the houseboat. Other sections were recorded at David's farm in Sussex and Mark Knopfler's British Grove Studios.

Orchestrations on the album were arranged by noted Polish film composer Zbigniew Preisner and conducted by Robert Ziegler. The orchestra was recorded at Abbey Road Studios by Simon Rhodes.

== Singles ==
The album also featured two singles; the title track "On an Island" and "Smile," the latter peaking at No. 72 on the UK Singles Chart. "On an Island" also peaked at No. 27 on the Billboard Mainstream Rock Tracks chart.

Promo Single edits of "Take a Breath" and "This Heaven" were issued to coincide with the U.S. leg of the tour, while "Smile" was the second single in the UK.

== Other releases ==
Copies of the album initially purchased from Best Buy in the United States contained an exclusive bonus audio CD with the instrumental track "Island Jam," which was subsequently released on the CD single for "Smile" in Europe.

The album was re-released in November 2006 with a bonus DVD of live tracks and other material.

A 5.1 mix of the album was released as part of the deluxe edition of "Live In Gdansk"

== Chart performance ==
On an Island entered the UK charts at No. 1, giving Gilmour his first chart-topping solo album. It also reached No. 1 on the European Chart, and peaked at No. 2 in Canada, Portugal and Iceland. It peaked at No. 6 on the Billboard 200 in the United States, making it Gilmour's first top 10 solo album in that country.

== Track listing ==
All music written by David Gilmour.

No.	Title	Lyrics	Length
1.	"Castellorizon"	Instrumental	3:54
2.	"On an Island"	Gilmour; Polly Samson	6:47
3.	"The Blue"	Samson	5:26
4.	"Take a Breath"	Samson	5:46
5.	"Red Sky at Night"	Instrumental	2:51
6.	"This Heaven"	Gilmour; Samson	4:24
7.	"Then I Close My Eyes"	Instrumental	5:26
8.	"Smile"	Samson	4:03
9.	"A Pocketful of Stones"	Samson	6:17
10.	"Where We Start"	Gilmour	6:45
Total length:			51:39

== Personnel ==
- David Gilmour – guitars (all), lead vocals (all except 1, 5, 7, "Island Jam"), lap steel guitars, electric piano (2), percussion (2, 3, 8–10), bass guitar (3, 8–10), piano (3, 8, 9), alto saxophone (5), cümbüş (7), bass harmonica (7), Hammond organ (7–10), harmonica (3)
- Guy Pratt – bass guitar (2, 4, "Island Jam")
- Richard Wright – Hammond organ (2), co-lead vocals (3)
- David Crosby – vocals (2)
- Graham Nash – vocals (2)
- Rado Klose – guitar (2, 3)
- Chris Stainton – Hammond organ (3)
- Andy Newmark – drums (2, 3, 6, 10), percussion (7)
- Jools Holland – piano (3)
- Polly Samson – piano (3), backing vocals (8)
- Phil Manzanera – guitar (4, 6, 7)
- Leszek Możdżer – piano (4, 9)
- Ged Lynch – drums (4, "Island Jam")
- Caroline Dale – cello (4, 5, 7)
- Chris Laurence – double bass (5, 9)
- Ilan Eshkeri – programming (5, 9)
- Georgie Fame – Hammond organ (6)
- BJ Cole – Weissenborn guitar (7)
- Robert Wyatt – cornet (7), percussion (7), vocals (7)
- Willie Wilson – drums (8)
- Alasdair Malloy – glass harmonica (7, 9)
- Lucy Wakeford – harp (9)
- Chris Thomas – keyboards (9)
- Zbigniew Preisner – orchestration (1, 2, 4–10)
- Paul "Wix" Wickens – Hammond organ ("Island Jam")

== Tour ==
Gilmour toured the album with Richard Wright, Phil Manzanera and long-time members of the live Pink Floyd band, Guy Pratt and Jon Carin. Steve DiStanislao was brought in as drummer. The shows included the entire On an Island album plus Pink Floyd songs such as "Shine on You Crazy Diamond", "Echoes", "Fat Old Sun", "Arnold Layne", "High Hopes", "Wish You Were Here" and "Comfortably Numb" among others. No songs from Gilmour's two previous solo albums were played. The tour is documented on the DVD/Blu-ray Remember That Night and the live album & DVD Live in Gdansk.

== Charts ==
=== Weekly charts ===
Chart (2006)	Peak position
Australian Albums (ARIA)	23
Austrian Albums (Ö3 Austria)	2
Belgian Albums (Ultratop Flanders)	9
Belgian Albums (Ultratop Wallonia)	3
Canadian Albums (Billboard)	2
Danish Albums (Hitlisten)	4
Dutch Albums (Album Top 100)	3
European Albums (Billboard)	1
Finnish Albums (Suomen virallinen lista)	4
French Albums (SNEP)	14
German Albums (Offizielle Top 100)	3
Hungarian Albums (MAHASZ)	2
Irish Albums (IRMA)	16
Italian Albums (FIMI)	1
New Zealand Albums (RMNZ)	2
Norwegian Albums (VG-lista)	1
Portuguese Albums (AFP)	4
Scottish Albums (Official Charts)	1
Spanish Albums (Promusicae)	47
Swedish Albums (Sverigetopplistan)	3
Swiss Albums (Schweizer Hitparade)	4
UK Albums (Official Charts)	1
US Billboard 200	6
US Top Rock Albums (Billboard)	3

=== Year-end charts ===
Chart (2006)	Position
Belgian Albums (Ultratop Wallonia)	49
Dutch Albums (Album Top 100)	55
French Albums (SNEP)	136
German Albums (Offizielle Top 100)	93
Hungarian Albums (MAHASZ)	83
Swedish Albums (Sverigetopplistan)	99

== Certifications and sales ==
Region	Certification	Certified units/sales
Canada (Music Canada)	Gold	50,000^{^}
France (SNEP)	Gold	50,000^{*}
Germany (BVMI)	Gold	100,000^{^}
Italy 2006 sales	—	100,000
Poland (ZPAV)	Platinum	20,000^{*}
Switzerland (IFPI Switzerland)	Gold	15,000^{^}
United Kingdom (BPI)	Platinum	300,000^{^}
United States	—	96,000
^{*} Sales figures based on certification alone.^{^} Shipments figures based on certification alone.
