= Pink Floyd live performances =

British rock band performances

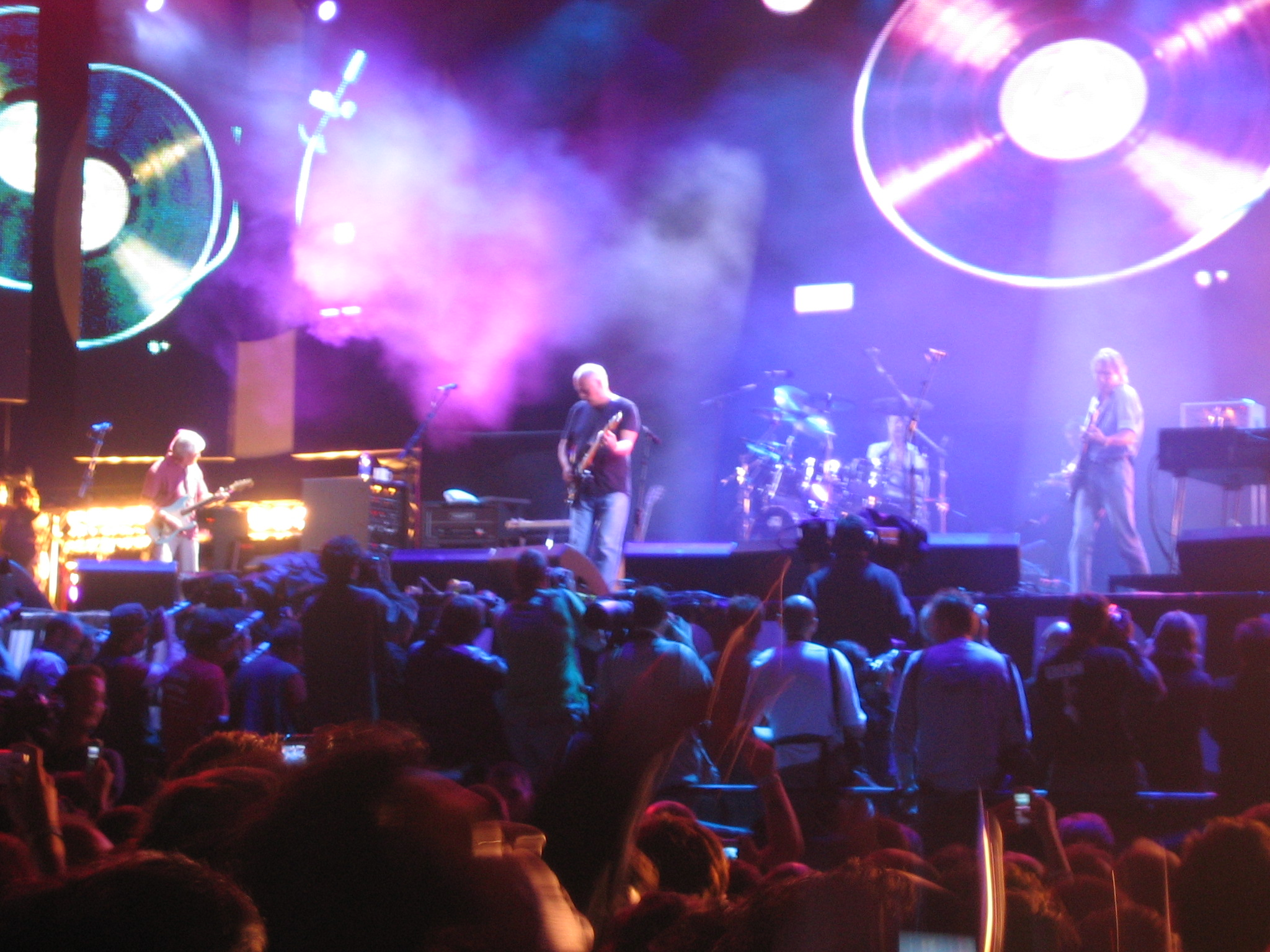
Pink Floyd's reunion, performing at Live 8 in London, July 2005

Pink Floyd are an English progressive rock band, formed in the mid-1960s in London.

== Performance history ==
=== Barrett era ===
Pink Floyd's earliest shows were performed in 1965. They included Bob Klose as a member of the band, which at first played mainly R&B covers. Klose left the band after 1965. The remaining four members played small (generally no more than 50 people), mostly unadvertised shows at the Marquee Club in London through June 1966. The set list continued to include R&B and psychedelia began to appear.

On 30 September 1966, Pink Floyd were invited to play All Saint's Church Hall to raise money for the nascent International Times newspaper and became the "house band". They began to use visual effects at these shows, and gradually stopped covering R&B. Word of these shows spread in the London underground culture and the band developed a following. On 23 December 1966, the first of the "International Times" associated gigs was played at the UFO Club in London. Mainstream interest about the counterculture was increasing, and part of the band's 20 January 1967 show at the UFO Club was broadcast in Granada TV's documentary entitled It's So Far Out, It's Straight Down. This was the first recording of the band playing live.

In April 1967, Pink Floyd were among 30 bands that played The 14 Hour Technicolor Dream benefit gig, which was organized for the "International Times" legal defense fund and held at Alexandra Palace in London. The other bands included The Who, The Move, The Pretty Things, Soft Machine, Tomorrow and The Creation. Guests included John Lennon, John Dunbar, Michael Caine, Yoko Ono, Julie Christie, Mick Jagger and David Hockney. Both the BBC and filmmaker Peter Whitehead filmed portions of the event. There is no known footage of Pink Floyd in the show.

On 12 May 1967, Pink Floyd performed at Queen Elizabeth Hall in London, in a concert entitled Games for May. At this show they debuted a multi-speaker pan pot system, controlled by a joystick from the stage, that allowed them to move the sound to remote loudspeakers. This precursor to their later "Azimuth Coordinator" was stolen after the show.

Their debut single, "Arnold Layne", charted well in the UK, and the band was invited to perform on the BBC2 music show The Look of the Week on 14 May 1967. The setlist for the broadcast consisted of "Pow R. Toc H." and "Astronomy Domine". This was their first British television appearance.

Pink Floyd appeared on the BBC2 music show Top of the Pops for three weeks in July 1967 after their second single "See Emily Play" reached No. 6 on the UK charts. By this time, guitarist and songwriter Syd Barrett's behavior had become difficult and unpredictable. On one occasion he remarked that if John Lennon did not have to appear on Top of the Pops, neither did he. Their management company, Blackhill Enterprises, convinced the band to cancel their August shows and go to Spain to recuperate.

Throughout the summer and into the autumn of 1967, copious drug use, especially of LSD, and constant pressure by the record company to write new hit songs, continued to affect Barrett's mental state. He became unable to make a meaningful contribution on stage, playing his guitar incoherently and sometimes not playing at all. On the band's first US tour in November 1967, he stared blankly into space during their 4 November American Bandstand performance, strummed listlessly and barely managed to mime the vocals to "Apples and Oranges". On 5 November, when they appeared on The Pat Boone Show, Barrett sat in silence, not answering questions. He refused to mime "See Emily Play" and Waters was forced to mime the track instead. (Waters confirmed this on the VH1's Legends: Pink Floyd episode). After the 22 December show, the rest of the band put out the word that they needed another guitarist. Jeff Beck and Davy O'List were considered. David Gilmour was brought in to augment Barrett during live shows, and for the first four UK shows of 1968 Pink Floyd was a five-man live act. On 26 January 1968, on their way to a show at Southampton University the others decided not to pick up Barrett, and he was out of the band.

=== Transition and experimentation ===
A typical 1968 set list included some of the following:

- "Astronomy Domine"
- "Interstellar Overdrive"
- "Set the Controls for the Heart of the Sun"
- "Pow R. Toc H."
- "Let There Be More Light"
- "The Massed Gadgets of Hercules" (first performed on 23 May 1968, renamed "A Saucerful of Secrets" )
- "Flaming"
- "Keep Smiling People" (a prototype version of "Careful with That Axe, Eugene")

On 29 June 1968, Pink Floyd headlined the first free Hyde Park concert organized by their management company, Black hill Enterprises, which later parted ways with the band over their decision to remove Barrett. Others performing were Tyrannosaurus Rex, Roy Harper and Jethro Tull.

The one in '68 was wonderful because it was much more a picnic in the park than a mini-Woodstock. A lovely day. It was important for us too because it reminded us of our, uh, roots -- whether spurious or not. They *were* our roots -- not personally, but as an enterprise. We were the house band.

— Nick Mason,

A second tour of the US during July and August 1968 (see A Saucerful of Secrets US Tour) was launched to support release of their second album, A Saucerful of Secrets. Throughout 1968 and 1969, shows increasingly consisted of post-Barrett compositions, although "Astronomy Domine" and "Interstellar Overdrive" were performed into the 1970s. The band's audiences changed during this time. Barrett-era crowds had consisted mainly of hippies who would dance to the music. The band now drew a more "intellectual" crowd, who would sit and remain quiet until the last note of a song was played. By early 1969, most of the band's excess earnings were spent on upgrading their sound equipment, rather than maintaining a permanent light show. If visuals were used, they were provided by the venue or the local promoter.

A typical 1969 set list would include some of the following:

See: The Man And The Journey Tour

- "The Man/The Journey"
- "Astronomy Domine"
- "Interstellar Overdrive"
- "Set the Controls for the Heart of the Sun"
- "Pow R. Toc H."
- "Let There Be More Light"
- "A Saucerful of Secrets"
- "Cymbaline"
- "Green is the Color"
- "Main Theme" (rarely played)
- "Careful with That Axe, Eugene"

The shows at Mothers, Birmingham on 27 April 1969 and the College of Commerce, Manchester on 2 May 1969 were recorded for the live part of the Ummagumma album. The show at Bromley Technical College on 26 April 1969 was also stated to have been recorded for the album.

On 14 April 1969, at the Royal Festival Hall in London, the band debuted their new pan pot 360-degree sound system, dubbed the "Azimuth Coordinator". This show, named "More Furious Madness from the Massed Gadgets of Au Ximenes", consisted of two experimental "suites", "The Man" and "The Journey". Most of the songs were either earlier material retitled, or released later under a different name.

A UK tour during May and June 1969 culminated in the show called "The Final Lunacy" at the Royal Albert Hall on 26 June 1969. Considered one of Floyd's most experimental concerts, it featured a crew member dressed as a gorilla, a fired cannon, and band members sawing wood on the stage. At the finale of "The Journey" suite the band was joined on stage by the brass section of the Royal Philharmonic Orchestra and the ladies of the Ealing Central Amateur Choir. At the, end a pink smoke bomb was let off.

An additional complete performance of "The Man/The Journey" occurred at the Concertgebouw, Amsterdam on 17 September 1969 and was taped and broadcast by Dutch radio station Hilversum 3. Portions of the suites were being performed as late as early 1970.

=== The "Atom Heart Mother" era ===
A typical 1970 set list included some of the following:

- "Astronomy Domine"
- "Interstellar Overdrive"
- "Set the Controls for the Heart of the Sun"
- "A Saucerful of Secrets"
- "Cymbaline"
- "Green is the Color"
- "Main Theme" (rarely played, and only in early 1970)
- "Careful with That Axe, Eugene"
- "Sysyphus." pts. 1-4 (rarely played, and only in early 1970)
- "Grantchester Meadows"
- "Embryo"
- "The Violent Sequence" (rarely played, and only in early 1970)
- "Heart Beat, Pig Meat" performed at Manchester Opera House on 8 February 1970
- "Atom Heart Mother"
- "Fat Old Sun" (beginning in September)
- "Alan's Psychedelic Breakfast" (only played a few times in December)

At gigs in early 1970, Pink Floyd performed an instrumental piece which had originally been intended for their soundtrack of Michelangelo Antonioni's film Zabriskie Point, referred to as "The Violent Sequence". This became the basis for "Us and Them" on The Dark Side of the Moon. It was identical to the music of the eventual song and was the earliest part of 'Dark Side' to have been performed live.

In January 1970, the band began performing an untitled instrumental piece which became the title track of their next album, Atom Heart Mother. At this point, it had no orchestra or choir accompaniment. The song debuted at the Bath Festival in Somerset on 27 June 1970 under the title "The Amazing Pudding", the first time with orchestra and choir.

It was announced as "The Atom Heart Mother" by John Peel on his BBC Radio 1 show "Peel's Sunday Concert" on 16 July 1970, a name suggested by him to the band, and it was introduced by the same name two days later at the Hyde Park free concert. Local orchestras and choirs were not always available on tour, and the band played a simpler version of the song when they performed live.

On 28 June 1970, Pink Floyd was the end-performance of the Kralingen Music Festival or "Stamping Ground" in a park near Rotterdam, The Netherlands. On 18 July 1970, they headlined a free concert in Hyde Park, London, organized by Blackhall Enterprises, and closed the show with "Atom Heart Mother". The song had been given the name after Roger Waters read an article in a newspaper about a woman who had a prototype heart pacemaker.

Pink Floyd also appeared at a small free festival in Canterbury on 31 August 1970, which was filmed. This was the final part of the Medicine Ball Caravan tour organized by Warner Brothers, later made into a film of the same name. Pink Floyd footage was not included. Over 500,000 people came to their show at Fête de Humanity, Paris on 12 September 1970, their largest crowd ever. Filmed by French TV, the show was never broadcast. An experimental track on the album Atom Heart Mother, "Alan's Psychedelic Breakfast", was performed at a few gigs in December 1970.

A recording was made of a Fillmore West show in San Francisco, California on 29 April 1970 on Wolfgang's Vault. The show included material from Ummagumma and Atom Heart Mother.

=== Early performances of "Echoes" ===
A typical 1971 set list included some of the following:

- "Astronomy Domine" (dropped from the setlist in June)
- "Set the Controls for the Heart of the Sun"
- "A Saucerful of Secrets"
- "Cymbaline"
- "Green Is the Color" (dropped from the setlist in August)
- "Careful with That Axe, Eugene"
- "Embryo"
- "Atom Heart Mother"
- "Fat Old Sun"
- "Echoes"
- "One of These Days" (beginning in late September / early October)

In January 1971 the band was working in the studio on a track of unconnected parts with the working title either "Nothing — Parts 1 to 24" or "Nothing Parts 1–36". The song made its live debut under the title "Return of the Son of Nothing" on 22 April 1971 in Norwich, England. Like "Atom Heart Mother" before it, it was a work in progress. It was later released as "Echoes" on the album Meddle.

The song was announced as "Echoes" on 6 August 1971 at Hakone, Japan, with additional lyrics at later August gigs. The show on 18 September 1971 at Montreux, Switzerland and subsequent shows did not have the additional lyrics. In 1972, during a German tour, Waters sardonically introduced Echoes as "Looking Through the Knotholes in Granny's Wooden Leg" (a Goon Show reference) on one occasion and "The March of the Dam Busters" on another. On another occasion, during a live radio broadcast, Waters had instructed compere John Peel to announce "One of These Days" to the home audience as "A poignant appraisal of the contemporary social situation."

After the band's Crystal Palace Garden Party performance in London on 15 May 1971, it was discovered that the use of fireworks had killed fish in the lake in front of the stage.

=== Eclipse - A Piece for Assorted Lunatics ===
A typical 1972 set list included:

First Set:

- "Breathe in the Air"
- "The Travel Sequence"
- "Time"
- "Home Again"
- "The Mortality Sequence" (aka "Religion")
- "Money"
- "The Violent Sequence"
- "Scat"
- "Lunatic"
- "Eclipse"

Second Set:

- "One of These Days"
- "Set the Controls for the Heart of the Sun" (or as an encore)
- "Careful with That Axe, Eugene" (or as an encore)
- "Echoes" (or as an encore)
- "Atom Heart Mother" (rarely, last performance on 22 May 1972)
- "A Saucerful of Secrets" (rarely in second set, usually as an encore)
- "Childhood's End" (rarely, introduced in November 1972)

Encore:
Rotated one of these three songs:

- "A Saucerful of Secrets" (last performance on 23 September 1972)
- "Set the Controls for the Heart of the Sun" (or in second set)
- "Echoes" (or in second set)

Occasionally, multiple song encores were performed, adding:

- "Blues"

With 98 shows, the most until 1994, 1972 was the last time Pink Floyd varied their set lists each night on a tour until the final one. Songs played in the second set and encore were swapped constantly, and the number of songs played in the encore varied from the usual one to two or three.

In 1972 Pink Floyd performed the debut of an entire album prior to its release. The original title of the album was Eclipse (A Piece for Assorted Lunatics), then The Dark Side of the Moon - A Piece for Assorted Lunatics, the name under which it made its press debut in February 1972 at London's Rainbow Theatre. The title changed for the first part of the US tour to Eclipse (A Piece for Assorted Lunatics) during April and May before reverting to Dark Side of the Moon - A Piece for Assorted Lunatics in September for the second part of the US tour and finally released in 1973 under the title of The Dark Side of the Moon.

One of the two shows at The Dome, Brighton, England on 28 June and 29 June was filmed by Peter Clifton for inclusion on his film Sounds of the City. Clips of these appear occasionally on television, and the performance of "Careful with That Axe, Eugene" is on the various artists video Superstars in Concert.

In November 1972, in the middle of the European leg of their 1972 world tour, and again in January 1973, Pink Floyd performed with the Roland Petit Ballet. The portion of the setlist for which the ballet was choreographed was "One of These Days", "Careful with That Axe, Eugene", "Obscured by Clouds", "When You're In" and "Echoes".

=== Dark Side of the Moon ===
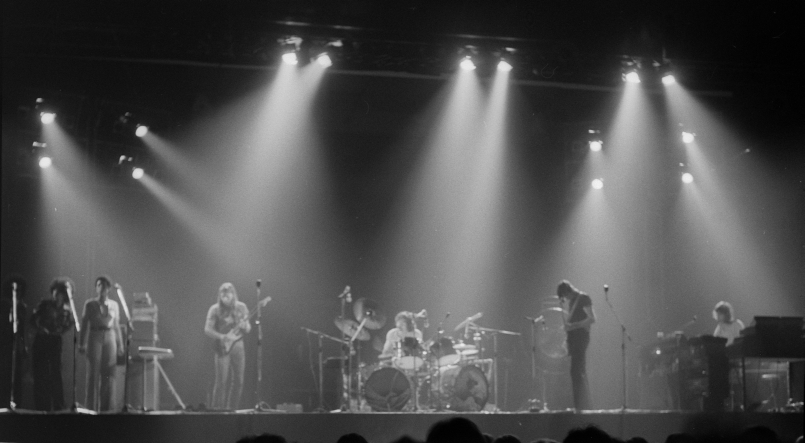
Dark Side of the Moon, Earls Court, 1973

An early 1973 set list (until mid-March) included:

First Set:

- "Echoes"
- "Obscured by Clouds"/"When You're In" (The two songs incorporated into a longer piece with a jamming guitar & keyboard section in the middle)
- "Childhood's End" (rarely)
- "Careful with That Axe, Eugene"

Second Set:
The Dark Side of the Moon entire album
Encore:

- "One of These Days"

For the remainder of 1973 (except 4 November), the set list included:

First Set:

- "Obscured by Clouds"
- "When You're In"
- "Set the Controls for the Heart of the Sun"
- "Careful with That Axe, Eugene"
- "Echoes"

Second Set:
The Dark Side of the Moon entire album
Encore:

- "One of These Days"

In 1973, the band moved Dark Side of the Moon to the second set (where it would stay through 1975), and played the album version of the piece, notably the revamped versions of "On the Run" and "The Great Gig in the Sky." In 1973 Pink Floyd undertook two short tours of the US, one in March to coincide with the release of The Dark Side of the Moon and one in June. Sandwiched between them were two nights at London's Earl's Court on 18 May and 19 May, where they debuted the special effect of a plane crashing into the stage at the end of the song "On the Run". This was also the first time that the band took additional musicians on tour with them. For earlier tour performances of "Atom Heart Mother" the band hired local musicians.

In June 1973, the chart success of The Dark Side of the Moon, which reached No. 1 in the US in late April, No. 2 in the UK, and the US-released single "Money", changed the nature of Pink Floyd's audiences. David Gilmour said, "It was 'Money' that made the difference, rather than 'The Dark Side of the Moon'. It gave us a much larger following, for which we should be thankful. ... People at the front shouting, 'Play Money! Gimme something I can shake my ass to!' We had to get used to it, but previously we'd been playing to 10,000 seaters where, in the quiet passages, you could hear a pin drop." They could now sell out stadiums.

On 4 November 1973, Pink Floyd played two shows at London's Rainbow Theatre for the benefit of musician Robert Wyatt, formerly the drummer of Soft Machine, a band they had played with in their UFO Club days. Wyatt fell from a fourth floor window in June 1973, breaking his back and becoming a paraplegic. The set list for these two shows were:

Main Set:
The Dark Side of the Moon entire album
Encore:

- "Obscured by Clouds"
- "When You're In"

=== 1974 Tours ===
A French Summer Tour set list included all of the following:

- "Raving and Drooling"
- "Shine On You Crazy Diamond"
- "Echoes"
- The Dark Side of the Moon (Entire album)

Encore (one of the following):

- "Careful with That Axe, Eugene"
- "One of These Days"

A British Winter Tour set list included all of the following:

- "Shine On You Crazy Diamond"
- "Raving and Drooling"
- "You've Got to be Crazy"
- The Dark Side of the Moon (Entire album)

Encore:

- "Echoes"

These early versions of "Shine On You Crazy Diamond", "Raving and Drooling" & "You've Got to be Crazy" were released as part of the Wish You Were Here Experience and Immersion sets.

=== 1975 North America Tour & Knebworth '75 ===
A typical 1975 set included all of the following:

- "Shine On You Crazy Diamond (Parts I-V)"
- "Have a Cigar"
- "Shine On You Crazy Diamond (Parts VI-IX)"
- "Raving and Drooling"
- "You've Got to be Crazy"
- The Dark Side of the Moon (entire album)

Encore:

- "Echoes"

In 1975, prior to the release of Wish You Were Here, the band launched a short tour two-month tour which sold out stadiums and arenas across America. The last gig of the tour was as headliner of the 1975 Knebworth Festival in England, which also featured The Steve Miller Band, Captain Beefheart and Roy Harper, who joined Pink Floyd on the stage to sing "Have a Cigar".

The band's special effects featured a fly-past by a pair of Spitfires. This was supposed to synchronise with the start of 'Breathe', but the band had technical difficulties and the planes flew over before the start of the set. Knebworth was the last time the band performed "Echoes" and the entire Dark Side of the Moon with Roger Waters.

=== In the Flesh ===
A typical 1977 set list included the following:

- Animals (entire album)
- Wish You Were Here (entire album)

Encore:

- "Money"
- "Us and Them"
- "Careful with That Axe, Eugene" (performed once in Oakland, California)
- "Drift Away Blues" (performed once in Montreal, Quebec, Canada)

In 1977, Pink Floyd embarked on a world tour in support of the "Animals" album. Although the album had not sold as well as their two previous releases, "Dark Side Of The Moon" and "Wish You Were Here", the band's popularity was at an all-time high. The band managed to sell out arenas and stadiums in both Europe and America, setting attendance records all along the way. In Chicago, the band played to an estimated audience of 95,000; in Cleveland and Montreal, they set attendance records for those venues by playing to over 80,000 people. The "In the Flesh" tour would later become widely known as their most memorable series of concert performances, and the last in which Roger Waters would accompany the band. The elaborate stage presentations, particularly those constructed for the outdoor venues, were their most complex and elaborate to date. Designed by Mark Fisher and Andrew Sanders, they featured a pyrotechnic "waterfall", umbrella-like canopies that could be deployed to protect the band from the elements, and a variety of characters associated with the "Animals" album; including "Algie", a 40-foot long inflatable pig that drifted out over the audience, the "Average American family" (which, at the time, included Mom, Dad and 2.5 children), and paper sheep that parachuted down on the crowds after being shot from cannons mounted to the sides of the stage. The musicians that accompanied the band on the tour included veteran saxophone player Dick Parry (occasionally playing keyboards as well) and guitarist Snowy White, who also filled in on bass guitar for some songs.

In the first half of each show, the band played all of the songs from Animals, but in a slightly different sequence than the album (typically starting with "Sheep", then "Pigs On the Wing (Part 1)", "Dogs", "Pigs On the Wing (Part 2)" and "Pigs (Three Different Ones)"). The second half of the shows consisted of Wish You Were Here being played in its exact running order ("Shine On You Crazy Diamond (Parts 1-5)", "Welcome to the Machine", "Have a Cigar", "Wish You Were Here" and "Shine On You Crazy Diamond (Parts 6-9)"). The encores would usually consist of either "Money" or "Us and Them" from Dark Side of the Moon or both. At the Oakland, California show on May 9, they played "Careful with That Axe, Eugene" as a third encore, the last time the song was ever performed live.

The tour started in Dortmund, West Germany on 23 January and proceeded through Europe, ending in Stafford, England on 31 March. Three weeks later, the North American leg of the tour opened in Miami, Florida on 22 April, concluding in Montreal, Quebec on 6 July. In the run-up to the band's four-night run at Madison Square Garden in New York City (1–4 July), tour promoters used an aggressive marketing strategy, filling pages of The New York Times and Billboard magazine with ads. In May, there was a Pink Floyd parade on 6th Avenue featuring both inflatable and live animals.

Another memorable performance occurred in Cleveland, Ohio on 25 June. The show was held at Cleveland Municipal Stadium, just a short distance from Burke Lakefront Airport. Most of the shows opened with a recording of jet airplane taking off, but promoters secretly arranged for the band's Boeing 737 jet to do a low flyover directly over the stadium as the show opened. The FAA later fined the promoters $1,500 over the incident. The show was also delayed briefly by a fan that grabbed the tether line for the inflatable pig and wouldn't release it. At their performance in Boston two nights later, Waters jokingly said "We're going to take a PIG break, back in 20 minutes". He closed the show by gratefully commenting that this had been "the perfect end to the perfect day, good night and God bless".

As the tour began, everyone was in good spirits, but the later shows were marred by Roger Waters' increasing annoyance with the raucous fans in attendance. During the last show in Montreal, a noisy fan near the stage irritated Waters to such an extent that he spat on him. The act so disgusted David Gilmour that he left the stage prior to the final encore, "Drift Away Blues", leaving Snowy White to fill in as the roadies began dismantling the stage equipment. The insatiable audience clamored for the band to keep playing, and a small riot broke out in front of the stage following the band's eventual exit. Later that night, Waters recounted the incident to his friend, music producer Bob Ezrin, and expressed his growing feelings of alienation toward their fans. Those feeling of detachment became the starting and focal point for Pink Floyd's next album, The Wall.

=== The Wall live ===
The 1980/1981 set lists comprised the entire album, The Wall.

Pink Floyd mounted its most elaborate stage show in conjunction with the tour of The Wall. A band of session musicians played the first song, wearing rubber face masks taken from the real band members, then backed up the band for the remainder of the show. Most notable was the giant wall constructed between the band and the audience.

The costs of the tour were estimated to have reached US$1.5 million even before the first performance. The New York Times stated in its 2 March 1980 edition that:

The 'Wall' show remains a milestone in rock history though and there's no point in denying it. Never again will one be able to accept the technical clumsiness, distorted sound and meagre visuals of most arena rock concerts as inevitable" and concluded that "the 'Wall' show will be the touchstone against which all future rock spectacles must be measured.

The show was designed by Mark Fisher with art direction by Gerald Scarfe.

The Wall concert was only performed a handful of times each in four cities: Los Angeles, Uniondale (Long Island), Dortmund, and London (at Earl's Court). The primary 'tour' occurred in 1980, but the band performed eight shows at Dortmund (14–20 February 1981) and five more shows at Earl's Court (13–17 June) for filming, with the intention of integrating the shows into the upcoming movie. The resulting footage was deemed substandard and scrapped; years later, Roger Waters has given conflicted answers on the status of the concert films stating from "trying to locate this footage for historical purposes but was unsuccessful and considers it to be lost forever" to "I have all of the film but am reluctant to release". There are several unofficial videos of the entire live show in circulation and some footage is shown on the Behind the Wall documentary.

Gilmour and Mason attempted to convince Waters to expand the show for a more lucrative, large-scale stadium tour, but because of the nature of the material (one of the primary themes is the distance between an artist and his audience) Waters balked at this. In fact, Waters had reportedly been offered a guaranteed US$1 million for each additional stadium concert, but declined the offer, insisting that such a tour would be hypocritical.

These shows are documented on the album Is There Anybody Out There? The Wall Live 1980-81.

Waters recreated the Wall show in Berlin in 1990, alongside the ruins of the Berlin Wall, and was joined by a number of guest artists (including Bryan Adams, Scorpions, Van Morrison, The Band, Tim Curry, Cyndi Lauper, Sinéad O'Connor, Marianne Faithfull, Joni Mitchell, Ute Lemper and Thomas Dolby). This concert was even bigger than the previous ones, as Waters built a 550-foot (170 m) long and 82-foot (25 m) high wall. The size of the theatrical features of The Wall were increased to cater for a sold-out audience of 200,000 people and of another estimated 500 million, in 35 countries, watching on television. After the concert began, the gates were opened and an estimated 300,000 to 500,000 people were able to watch the concert. This show is available on The Wall Live in Berlin album and DVD.

Roger staged another tour of The Wall in 2010 saying of the story "It has occurred to me that maybe the story of my fear and loss with its concomitant inevitable residue of ridicule, shame and punishment, provides an allegory for broader concerns: Nationalism, racism, sexism, religion, Whatever! All these issues and ‘isms are driven by the same fears that drove my young life."

=== A Momentary Lapse of Reason ===
After the release of A Momentary Lapse of Reason in 1987, Pink Floyd embarked on an 11-week tour to promote the album. The two remaining members of the band, David Gilmour and Nick Mason, along with Richard Wright, had just won a legal battle against Roger Waters and the future of the group was uncertain. Having the success of The Wall shows to live up to, the concerts' special effects were more impressive than ever. The initial "promotional tour" was extended, and finally lasted almost two years, ending in 1989 after playing around 200 concerts to about 5.5 million people in total, including 3 dates at Madison Square Garden (5–7 October 1987) and 2 nights on Wembley Stadium (5–6 August 1988). The tour took Pink Floyd to various exotic locations they had never played before such as shows in the forecourt of the Palace of Versailles, Moscow's Olympic Stadium, De Kuip Rotterdam and Venice, despite fears and protests that the sound would damage the latter city's foundations.

These shows are documented by the Delicate Sound of Thunder album and video.

Pink Floyd was the second highest grossing act of 1987 and the highest grossing of 1988 in the U.S. Financially, Pink Floyd was the biggest act of these two years combined, grossing almost US$60 million from touring, about the same as U2 and Michael Jackson, their closest rivals, combined. Worldwide, the band grossed around US$135 million.

The tour marked the first time that the band played in Russia, Norway, Spain, New Zealand and was the first time they had played in Australia since 1971.

A further concert was held at the Knebworth Festival in 1990, a charity event that also featured other Silver Clef Award winners. Pink Floyd was the last act to play, to an audience of 125,000. During this gig Clare Torry sang backing vocals making it the second and last time she did so. Vicki and Sam Brown also attended as backing vocalists, as well as Candy Dulfer with a saxophone solo. The £60,000 firework display that ended the concert was entirely financed by the band.

=== The Division Bell ===
The Division Bell Tour in 1994 was promoted by Canadian concert impresario Michael Cohl and became the highest-grossing tour in rock music history to that date, with the band playing the entirety of The Dark Side of the Moon in some shows, for the first time since 1975.

The concerts featured more elaborate special effects than the previous tour, including two custom designed airships. The arch-shaped stage was designed by Marc Brickman and Mark Fisher with lighting by Marc Brickman. Three stages leapfrogged around North America and Europe, each 180 feet (55 m) long and featuring a 130-foot (40 m) arch modelled on the Hollywood Bowl. All in all, the tour required 700 tons of steel carried by 53 articulated trucks, a crew of 161 people and an initial investment of US$4 million plus US$25 million of running costs just to stage. This tour played to 5.5 million people in 68 cities; each concert gathered an average 45,000 audience. At the end of the year, the Division Bell Tour was announced as the highest-grosing tour at the time, with worldwide gross of over £150 million (about US$250 million). In the U.S. alone, it grossed US$103.5 million from 59 concerts.

These shows are documented by the Pulse album and Pulse (1995 film).

=== Post-Pulse era ===
==== 1996: Rock and Roll Hall of Fame performance ====
In 1996, Gilmour and Wright performed "Wish You Were Here" with Billy Corgan (of The Smashing Pumpkins fame) at their Rock and Roll Hall of Fame induction.

==== 2001: David Gilmour & Nick Mason statements about Pink Floyd touring again in the future ====
In an interview with BBC Radio 2 in October, 2001, Gilmour implied that the Echoes: The Best of Pink Floyd compilation (released in November 2001) "probably" signaled the end of the band. "You never know exactly what the future (holds)", Gilmour said. "I'm not going to slam any doors too firmly, but I don't see myself doing any more of that, and I certainly don't see myself going out on a big Floyd tour again." A few days later in an interview with Launch.com, Nick Mason contradicted the statement, saying "I don't feel I've retired yet. You know, if everyone wanted to, we could certainly still do something. I've spent 30 years waiting for the planets to align. I'm quite used to it."

==== 2002: David Gilmour in Concert DVD release ====
David Gilmour released a solo concert DVD called David Gilmour in Concert in November 2002 which was compiled from shows on 22 June 2001 and 17 January 2002 at The Royal Festival Hall in London. Richard Wright, Robert Wyatt, and Bob Geldof (Pink in The Wall film) make guest appearances.

==== 2003: Steve O'Rourke's funeral performance ====
Longtime manager Steve O'Rourke died on 30 October 2003. Gilmour, Mason and Wright performed "Fat Old Sun" and "The Great Gig in the Sky" at his funeral at Chichester Cathedral, contrary to reports in the media claiming they played "Wish You Were Here".

==== 2005: Live 8 performance ====
On 2 July 2005 Pink Floyd performed at the London Live 8 concert with Roger Waters rejoining David Gilmour, Nick Mason and Richard Wright. It was the quartet's first performance together in over 24 years, having not performed in that configuration since a 17 June 1981 gig at Earls Court in London as part of a charitable fundraiser.

Gilmour announced the Live 8 reunion on 12 June 2005:

Like most people I want to do everything I can to persuade the G8 leaders to make huge commitments to the relief of poverty and increased aid to the third world. It's crazy that America gives such a paltry percentage of its GNP to the starving nations. Any squabbles Roger and the band have had in the past are so petty in this context, and if re-forming for this concert will help focus attention then it's got to be worthwhile.

The band's set consisted of "Speak to Me/Breathe/Breathe (Reprise)", "Money", "Wish You Were Here", and "Comfortably Numb". This is the only known occurrence when Pink Floyd played "Breathe" and "Breathe (Reprise)" together as a single piece. As on the original recordings, Gilmour sang the lead vocals on "Breathe" and "Money", and shared them with Waters on "Comfortably Numb". For "Wish You Were Here", Waters sang half of the verse's lyrics, unlike the original recording. When Waters was not singing, he was often enthusiastically mouthing the lyrics off-microphone. During the guitar introduction of "Wish You Were Here", Waters said:

It's actually quite emotional standing up here with these three guys after all these years. Standing to be counted with the rest of you. Anyway, we're doing this for everyone who's not here, but particularly, of course, for Syd.

They were augmented by guitarist/bassist Tim Renwick (guitarist on Roger Waters' 1984 solo tour, who has since become Pink Floyd's backing guitarist on stage); keyboardist/lap steel guitarist/backup vocalist Jon Carin (Pink Floyd's backing keyboardist from 1987 onward who also toured with both Waters and Gilmour); saxophonist Dick Parry (who played on the original recording of the song) during "Money"; and backing singer Carol Kenyon during "Comfortably Numb".

During "Breathe", on the screen behind them, film of the iconic pig from the Animals album was shown flying over Battersea Power Station (itself visible on the horizon in television broadcasts of the performance), and during "Money", a shot of The Dark Side of the Moon record being played was shown. During "Comfortably Numb", the three giant screens showed the Pink Floyd Wall (from the cover of The Wall), and during the final guitar solo, the words "Make Poverty History" were written on the wall.

At the end, after the last song had been played, Gilmour said "thank you very much, good night" and started to walk off the stage. Waters called him back, however, and the band shared a group hug that became one of the most famous pictures of Live 8. As they proceeded to walk off, Nick Mason threw his drumsticks into the audience. With Wright's subsequent death, in September 2008, this was to be the final concert to feature all four bandmates playing together.

==== 2007: Syd Barrett tribute concert ====
On 10 May 2007 Pink Floyd (Wright, Gilmour and Mason), joined by Andy Bell of Oasis on bass and Jon Carin on keys, performed at London's Barbican Centre as part of "The Madcap's Last Laugh", a tribute concert for Syd Barrett who had died the previous year. They played "Arnold Layne", and later joined other artists to perform "Bike". This would be the last time Wright appeared as part of Pink Floyd, before his own death the following year.

Roger Waters appeared in the concert performing his own song "Flickering Flame", also with Jon Carin on keys, but did not take part in either song with the members of Pink Floyd.

In 2020, the live recording of "Arnold Layne" from this concert was released as a single for Record Store Day.

== Backing musicians ==
Because of the increasingly complex nature of Pink Floyd's music, more and more musicians besides the band were required on stage to recreate sounds achieved in the studio. Some performances of Atom Heart Mother featured an entire orchestra and choir, reputedly a nightmare to bring on tour. Less 'weighty' contributions from other musicians followed. In 1973 Dick Parry provided saxophone for Dark Side of the Moon and reprised this for live performances in every subsequent tour except those promoting The Wall and A Momentary Lapse of Reason, the latter in which Scott Page provided sax. For 1977's Animals promotion, Snowy White was brought in as an additional guitarist. He returned for The Wall shows along with a complete "surrogate band" consisting of Peter Wood (keyboards), Willie Wilson (drums) and Andy Bown (bass). Andy Roberts replaced White for the 1981 shows. For the A Momentary Lapse of Reason and Division Bell tours, Jon Carin (whom David Gilmour had met at Live Aid playing in Bryan Ferry's backing band) provided additional synthesizers and keyboards, Guy Pratt replaced Roger Waters on bass, Tim Renwick provided additional guitar and Gary Wallis additional percussion. Several backing vocalists, (the most notable of whom are Rachel Fury, Clare Torry, Sam Brown, Margaret Taylor, Durga McBroom and Carol Kenyon) have accompanied the band on and off from Dark Side of the Moon onwards. During their performance at Live 8, Pink Floyd used Tim Renwick, Jon Carin, Dick Parry and Carol Kenyon.

== Special effects ==
An integral part of almost every Pink Floyd live show has been the elaborate stage lighting and visual and special effects. Pink Floyd's sound, lighting and other stage technology set standards in the music industry. The band developed innovative use of sound effects and panning quadrophonic speaker systems in live performances from the mid-1960s until their final concerts decades later, including use of immersive live visuals.

=== Dynamic lighting ===
Pink Floyd were among the first bands to use a dedicated travelling light show in their performances. During the Barrett era, dynamic liquid light shows were projected on to enormous screens behind the band while they played. The show also incorporated large numbers of manually controlled strobe lights. These effects obscured the band, leaving just their shadows, and when he was not required to play, Barrett would raise his arms and make his shadow grow, shrink and undulate. The band developed many of these lighting techniques through an early association with light artist Mike Leonard.

When psychedelia fell out of fashion around 1970, elevated platforms of the type used for maintenance work on high buildings were brought on tour, filled with lighting equipment, and raised and lowered during performances. After the departure of Roger Waters in 1985, the Pink Floyd light show became much bigger and Marc Brickman, the group's lighting designer, utilized hundreds of automated intelligent lighting fixtures and state-of-the-art lasers. By the 1994 Division Bell tour, the show was using powerful, isotope-splitting, copper-vapour lasers, costing over $120,000 each, which had previously only been used in nuclear research and high speed photography work.

A large, circular projection panel first appeared in 1974 during performances of Dark Side of the Moon, and became a fixture thereafter. The high quality, wide angle projection needed for this required high-speed, 35mm, 10,000 watt xenon film projectors with custom lenses, all of which were designed, built and toured by Associates & Bran Ferren. Specially recorded films and animations were projected on to the screen, and for the 1977 "In the Flesh" and the 1980–1981 "The Wall Live" tours, coloured spotlights were fixed around the rim. This effect reached a climax with the dancing patterns of multi-colored lights in the A Momentary Lapse of Reason and Division Bell tours. On the Division Bell tour, the screen could be retracted behind the stage when not required. During the final guitar solo in "Comfortably Numb", it was tilted horizontally with its peripheral lights focused into a single spotlight on the stage,

Several generations of giant glitter balls began with the Dark Side of the Moon tour. By the Division Bell tour, the ball had evolved into a globe, 4.9 meters in diameter, which rose from the mixing station to a height of 21.3 meters before opening into an array of petals 7.3 meters wide during the final guitar solo of "Comfortably Numb", revealing a 12 kilowatt Phoebus HMI lamp.

=== Props and pyrotechnics ===
Pink Floyd made extensive use of pyrotechnics such as exploding flashpots, an exploding gong, fireworks and dry ice in performances throughout their career. On the 1973 tour to promote The Dark Side of the Moon, a large scale model plane flew over the audience and crashed on to the stage with a spectacular explosion, an effect repeated at the start of The Wall and the Division Bell shows. During shows to promote A Momentary Lapse of Reason, a similar effect was achieved with a flying bed.

Large helium balloons were first introduced during the Dark Side of the Moon tours, and in 1975 they began to play a central part in the live show. For the US leg of the 1975 tour, a pyramid-shaped dirigible was floated above the stage. It proved unstable in windy conditions and blew into the crowd, which tore it into pieces for souvenirs. The trademark giant pig was brought in for the Animals tour in 1977, floating over the audience, as well as a grotesque 'Nuclear Family', a refrigerator filled with worms, a television and a Cadillac. In some shows, an envelope of propane gas was put inside the pig, causing it to explode. The use of inflatables reached its peak in 1980–1981 during The Wall shows, in which several of the characters from the album were brought to life in the form of giant, fully mobile string puppets with menacing spotlights for eyes. The characters were designed by satirical artist Gerald Scarfe.

Special effects reached a new and outrageous level during the Wall shows. A 160-foot (49 m) long, 35-foot (11 m) high wall made from 340 white blocks was built across the front of the stage, between the audience and the band, during the first half of the show. The last block was put in place as Roger Waters sang "goodbye" at the end of the song "Goodbye Cruel World." In the second half of the show, the band was unseen, except for a hole in the wall that simulated a hotel room where Roger Waters "acted out" the story of Pink, and an appearance by David Gilmour on top of the wall to perform the climactic guitar solo in "Comfortably Numb." Other parts of the story were told by Scarfe's animations projected on to the wall. These animations were later integrated into the film Pink Floyd: The Wall. At the finale of the concert, the wall was demolished amidst sound effects and a spectacular light show.

== Major tours and concerts ==
- 30 September 1966 – The All Saints Church Hall Concert - London Free School/International Times Benefit Show
- 29–30 April 1967 – The 14 Hour Technicolor Dream concerts
- 12 May 1967 – Games for May concert
- 4–12 November 1967 – First US Tour (Note: A number of October/November 1967 Pink Floyd shows in the US were cancelled due to problems getting work permits in time: in particular the three shows on 26, 27 and 28 October 1967 at the Fillmore West in San Francisco, California.)
- 29 June 1968 – Midsummer High Weekend concert
- February – December 1968 – Pink Floyd World Tour 1968
- May – September 1969 – The Man and The Journey Tour
- 25 October 1969 - Actual Festival Agouties, Belgium
- 27 June 1970 – The Bath Festival of Blues and Progressive Music concert
- 28 June 1970 - The Holland Pop Festival in Kralingen Rotterdam
- September 1970 – October 1971 – Atom Heart Mother World Tour
- October – November 1971 – Meddle Tour
- January 1972 – November 1973 – Dark Side of the Moon Tour
- June 1974 – French Summer Tour
- November – December 1974 – British Winter Tour
- April – July 1975 – Wish You Were Here Tour
- January – July 1977 – In the Flesh Tour
- February 1980 – June 1981 – The Wall Tour (Is There Anybody Out There? The Wall Live 1980–81)
- September 1987 – August 1988 – A Momentary Lapse of Reason Tour (as documented by Delicate Sound of Thunder)
- May 1989 – July 1989 – Another Lapse Tour
- 30 June 1990 – Knebworth Festival concert
- 18 September 1993 – Cowdray Ruins concert
- March – October 1994 – The Division Bell Tour (as documented by Pulse)
- 17 January 1996 – Rock and Roll Hall of Fame performance
- 2 July 2005 – Live 8 concert
- 10 May 2007 – Syd Barrett Tribute concert
