= The Man and The Journey Tour =

1969 concert tour by Pink Floyd

- Tour by Pink Floyd
- Poster to the concerts in Brussels, Belgium
- Location: Europe
- Start date: 27 March 1969
- End date: 24 September 1969
- Legs: 1
- No. of shows: 29 (31 scheduled)

Pink Floyd concert chronology
- Pink Floyd World Tour 1968 (1968); The Man and The Journey Tour (1969); Atom Heart Mother World Tour (1970–1971)

The Man and The Journey tour was an informal (mostly English) concert tour of a few dates by Pink Floyd during which the conceptual music piece The Man and The Journey was played.

== Setlist ==
At most shows Pink Floyd performed The Man and The Journey, however at some shows this was not performed - these shows had a shorter set which usually included "Astronomy Domine", "Set the Controls for the Heart of the Sun" and unaltered versions of "Careful with That Axe, Eugene" and "A Saucerful of Secrets" as heard on Ummagumma. At concerts in Europe in early 1970, "The Man" section (first set) of The Man and the Journey was still performed, but "The Journey" section was not.

=== The Man and The Journey set list ===
This set list is from the 17 September 1969 show in Amsterdam.

First set

1. "Daybreak" ("Grantchester Meadows")
2. "Work" (Percussion and vibraphone with musical sawing and hammering)
3. "Teatime" (The band members were served tea on stage)
4. "Afternoon" ("Biding My Time")
5. "Doing It!" ("Entertainment" section of "The Grand Vizier's Garden Party" with tape effects. Earlier dates had an improvised drum and gong solo, with Farfisa organ and tape effects or "Up The Khyber" with tape effects)
6. "Sleep" ("Quicksilver")
7. "Nightmare" (Extended "Cymbaline" with tape effects. Improvisation with tape effects on early dates)
8. "Labyrinth" (instrumental alarm clock sounds and tape effects)

Second set

1. "The Beginning" ("Green is the Colour")
2. "Beset by Creatures of the Deep" ("Careful with That Axe, Eugene")
3. "The Narrow Way, Part 3"
4. "The Pink Jungle" (Extended "Pow R. Toc H.". Improvisation on early dates)
5. "The Labyrinths of Auximines" (Middle instrumental section of "Let There Be More Light". Improvisation on early dates)
6. "Footsteps/Doors" (tape effects)
7. "Behold the Temple of Light" (beginning of "The Narrow Way, Part 3 extended with jamming")
8. "The End of the Beginning" ("Celestial Voices")

Encore (when played)

1. "Interstellar Overdrive" (April 14 in London and May 24 in Sheffield) or "Set the Controls for the Heart of the Sun" (22 June in Manchester and 26 June in London)

=== Other shows ===
When The Man and The Journey was not performed, the shows usually contained all or some of the following:

1. "Astronomy Domine"
2. "Careful with That Axe, Eugene"
3. "Interstellar Overdrive"
4. "Green Is the Colour"
5. "Pow R. Toc H."
6. "Set the Controls for the Heart of the Sun"
7. "Let There Be More Light"
8. "A Saucerful of Secrets"

For the recording of Top Gear for BBC Radio 1, the band performed:

1. "Grantchester Meadows"
2. "Cymbaline"
3. "The Narrow Way, Part 3"
4. "Green Is the Colour"
5. "Careful with That Axe, Eugene" (truncated version)

This performance was released as part of The Early Years 1965–1972 box set in 2016.

== Tour dates ==
Date	City	Country	Venue	Notes
Europe
27 March 1969	Chesterfield	England	St James's Hall	The Man and The Journey not performed
14 April 1969	London	England	Royal Festival Hall	First performance of The Man and The Journey; Rick Wright played the Hall's pipe organ
19 April 1969	Stuttgart	West Germany	SDR TV Villaberg TV Studios	
23 April 1969	Hamburg	West Germany	NDR Funkhaus	
26 April 1969	London	England	Bromley Technical College	The Man and The Journey not performed
27 April 1969	Birmingham	England	Mothers	The Man and The Journey not performed Shows recorded for Ummagumma
2 May 1969	Manchester	England	Manchester College of Commerce	The Man and The Journey not performed Shows recorded for Ummagumma
3 May 1969	London	England	Queen Mary College	The Man and The Journey not performed
9 May 1969	Southampton	England	University of Southampton Students' Union	The Man and The Journey not performed
9 May 1969	Camden	England	Camden Festival '69	The Man and The Journey not performed
10 May 1969	Nottingham	England	Notts County F.C.	
12 May 1969	London	England	BBC Radio 1 (Top Gear)	The Man and The Journey not performed
15 May 1969	Coventry	England	Locarno Ballroom	
16 May 1969	Leeds	England	Town Hall	
24 May 1969	Sheffield	England	City Oval Hall	
25 May 1969	London	England	Roundhouse	
29 May 1969	Bristol	England	HTV TV Studios (Fusions)	
30 May 1969	Croydon	England	Fairfield Halls	
31 May 1969	Oxford	England	Pembroke College	
8 June 1969	Cambridge	England	Rex Ballroom	
10 June 1969	Belfast	Northern Ireland	Ulster Hall	
13 June 1969	Exeter	England	University of Exeter	
14 June 1969	Bristol	England	Colston Hall	
15 June 1969	Portsmouth	England	Guildhall	
16 June 1969	Brighton	England	Brighton Dome	
20 June 1969	Birmingham	England	Town Hall	
21 June 1969	Liverpool	England	Philharmonic Hall	
22 June 1969	Manchester	England	Free Trade Hall	
24 June 1969	Oxford	England	The Queen's College	
26 June 1969	London	England	Royal Albert Hall	Rick Wright played the Hall's pipe organ
9 August 1969	Amsterdam	Netherlands	Paradiso Club	The Man and The Journey not performed Performance broadcast on local radio
17 September 1969	Amsterdam	Netherlands	Concertgebouw	Rick Wright played the theatre's pipe organ Performance recorded and broadcast on VPRO radio station
24 September 1969	Maastricht	Netherlands	Staargebouw	
26 September 1969	Brussels	Belgium	Théâtre 140	
27 September 1969	Brussels	Belgium	Théâtre 140	
28 September 1969	Brussels	Belgium	Théâtre 140	

== Release ==
The 27 April (Birmingham) and 2 May (Manchester) concerts were recorded and parts released on the live half of the Ummagumma album, in November 1969. The recordings from 6 September and 17 September 1969 in Amsterdam were released as part of the box set The Early Years 1965-1972 in 2016. They are included in the volume titled 1969: Dramatis/ation. The volume also contains video footage from a rehearsal at the Royal Festival Hall, London on 14 April 1969.

== Personnel ==
- David Gilmour – electric and acoustic guitars, percussion, vocals
- Roger Waters – bass, nylon-string acoustic guitar, percussion, vocals, vocalisations
- Richard Wright – Farfisa organ, vibraphone, trombone, vocals, pipe organs (where available)
- Nick Mason – drums, percussion
