= Narrow Way =

Narrow Way may refer to:

- "The Narrow Way", a section on Pink Floyd's album Ummagumma
- "Narrow Way" (song), a song by Bob Dylan from the album Tempest
- Mare Street in the London Borough of Hackney, specifically its northernmost, pedestrianised section
