= Pink Floyd: Their Mortal Remains =

Exhibition on the history of the UK rock band Pink Floyd

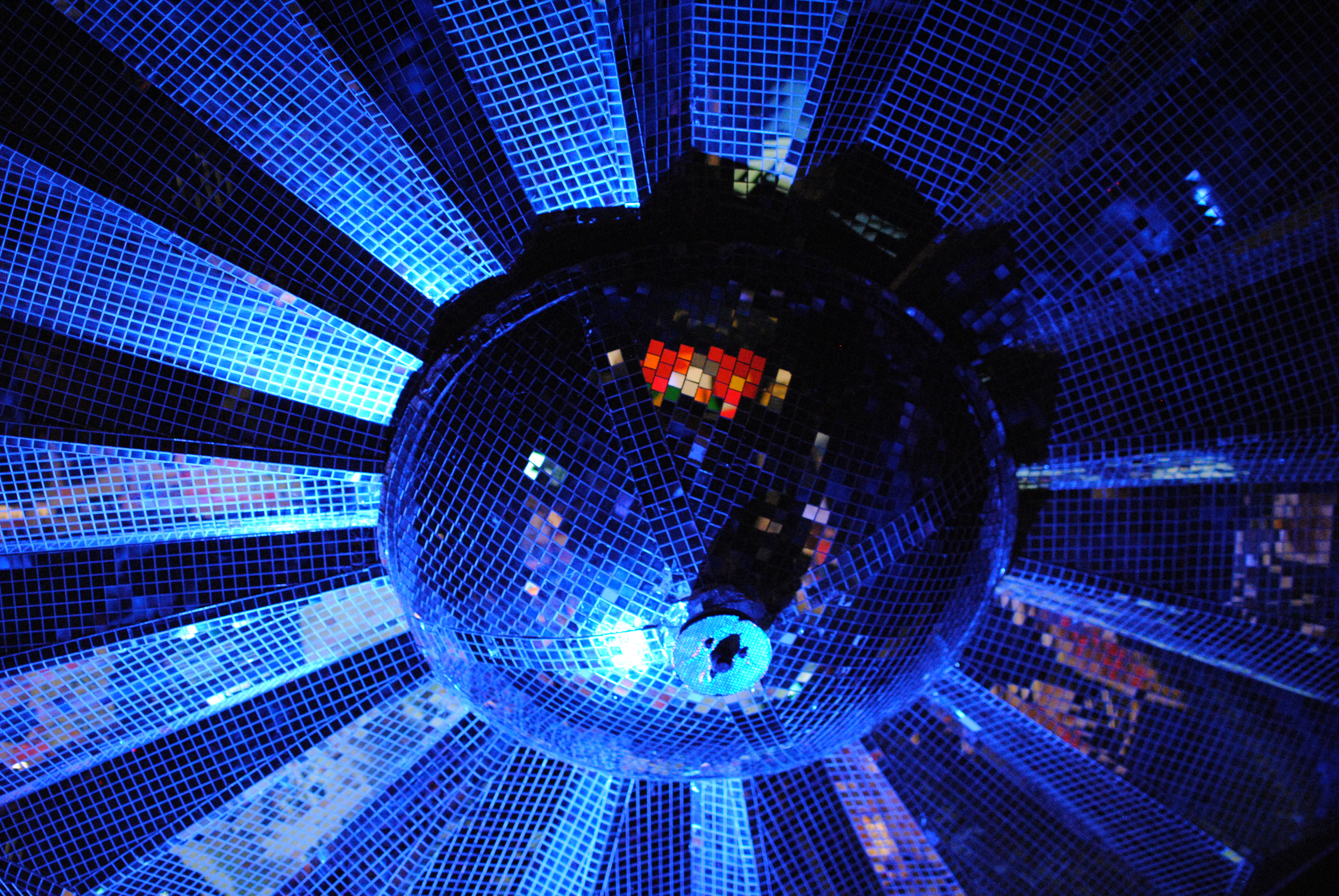
- Pink Floyd's 1975–1977 "Rotating flower-petal mirror ball" at the V&A
- Date: 13 May 2017–present
- Type: Museum exhibition
- Theme: Pink Floyd
- Website: www.pinkfloydexhibition.com

Pink Floyd: Their Mortal Remains is a touring exhibition of the history of the English rock band Pink Floyd, which opened on 13 May 2017 (with a museum members' preview on 12 May) at the Victoria and Albert Museum in London, England, and was originally scheduled to run until 1 October. After high visitor numbers, the exhibition's run was extended by two weeks, to 15 October 2017. It followed the V&As successful David Bowie Is exhibition.

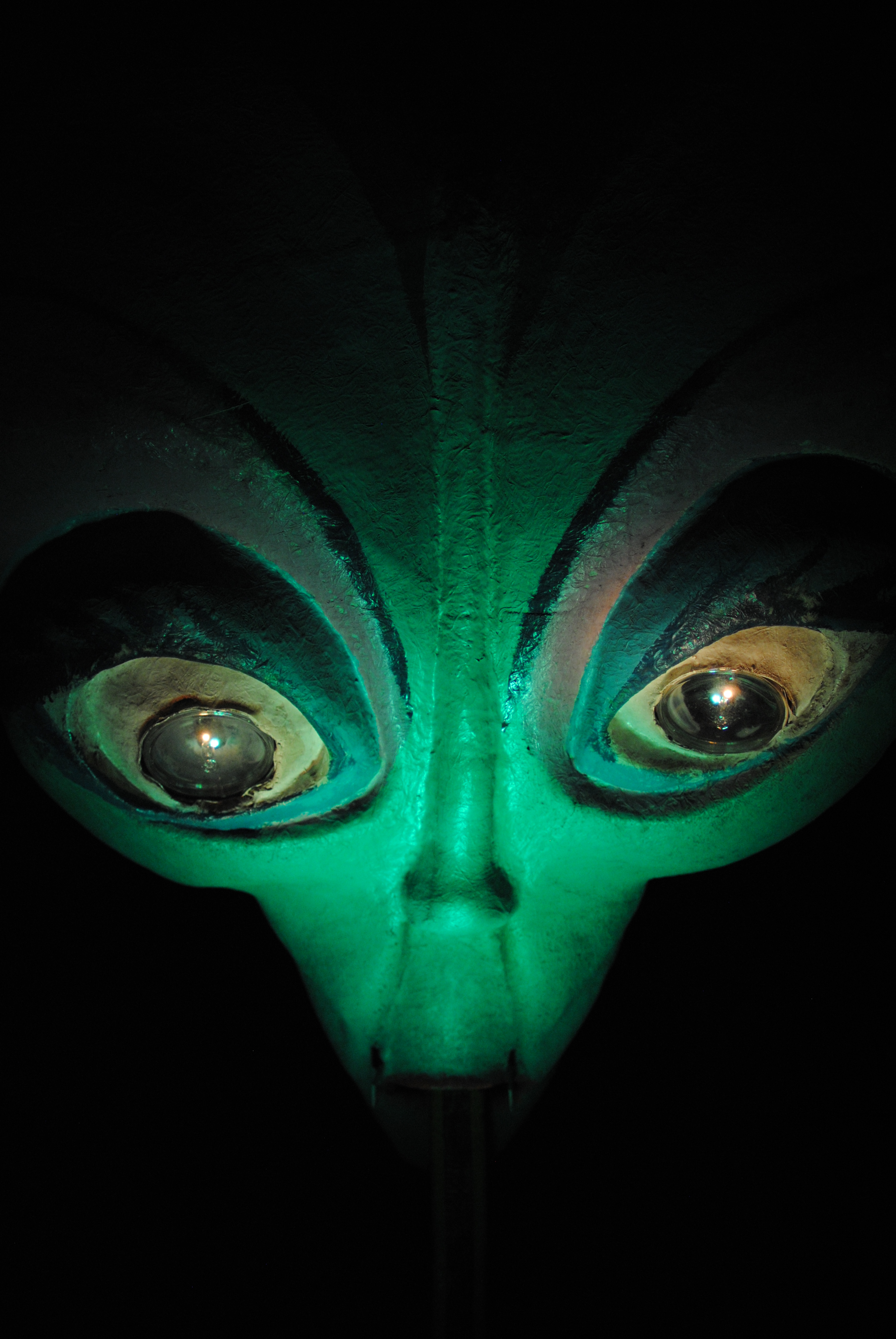
Head of the 'wife' puppet from the original The Wall concerts

== Naming and marketing ==
The exhibition's title reflects the lyric "I've got a grand piano to prop up my mortal remains", from the song "Nobody Home", on The Wall. It was promoted with media appearances by all three surviving band members (David Gilmour, Nick Mason, and Roger Waters), and designer Aubrey Powell; as well as the flying of an inflatable pig over the V&A, and at the BBC's Broadcasting House.

== Content ==
Treating the band's history in chronological order, the exhibition ends with their 2005 reunion at Live 8, with footage of the band performing "Comfortably Numb", using specially-remixed audio, delivered via AMBEO, a Sennheiser 3D audio technology, over 17 channels and 25 speakers, seven of which are subwoofers.

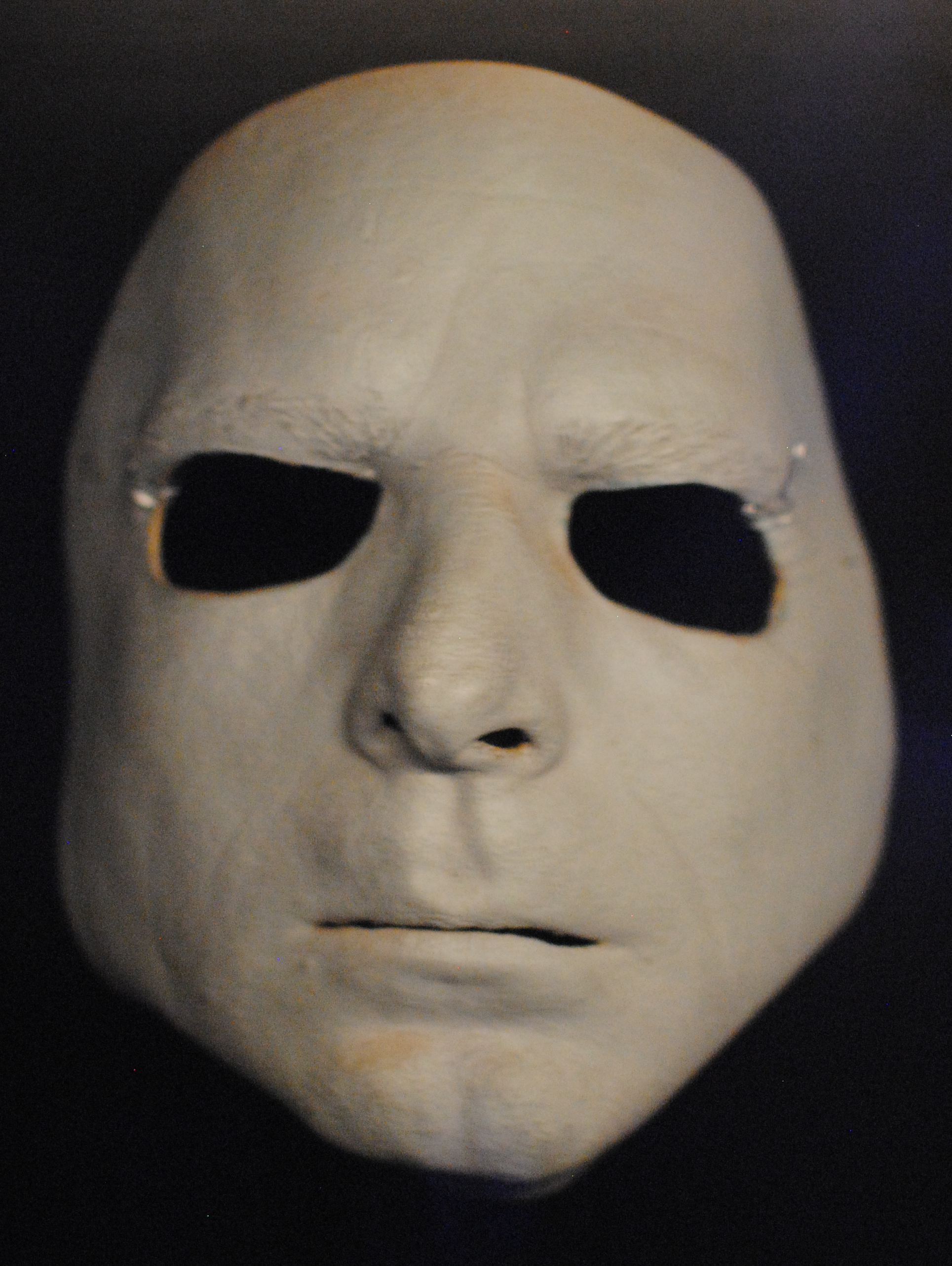
Mask cast from Richard Wright's face and worn by a member of the "surrogate band" during 'In the Flesh?', the opening number of The Wall concerts, in order to fool audiences into thinking the surrogate was Wright

Objects shown include documents such as a page from Nick Mason's diary for 1968 and a 1975 tour rider, a "flower petal" shaped mirrorball used from 1973 to 1975, instruments, plus equipment including the Azimuth Co-ordinator and the band's Binson Echorec Baby effects unit. There are several props from the 1980 and 1981 The Wall concerts, including the face masks worn by members of the 'surrogate band', to make them look like Pink Floyd. Also on show are a hand-written letter from Syd Barrett to Jenny Spires, his then girlfriend; and his bicycle.

== Future touring ==
The organisers plan to tour the exhibition internationally, for up to ten years. In November 2017, it was announced that the second venue would be Rome, Italy, opening on 19 January 2018. The Los Angeles exhibition was originally scheduled to begin in August, 2021. It was delayed for 3 weeks due to global shipping delays caused by the Covid-19 pandemic. The show opened on 3 September 2021 instead. In October 2022, it was announced that the exhibition would be shown in Montreal, Canada, from 4 November 2022, to 31 December 2022. It would be extended three times to close 2 April 2023.

== Attendance ==
By late August 2017, the London exhibition had been seen by 300,000 visitors and was extended by two weeks to 15 October.

== Venues ==
Opening Date	Closing Date	Duration (days)	City	Country	Venue
13 May 2017	15 October 2017	155	London	United Kingdom	Victoria and Albert Museum
19 January 2018	27 May 2018	127	Rome	Italy	Museum of Contemporary Art of Rome
15 September 2018	10 February 2019	148	Dortmund	Germany	Dortmunder U
10 May 2019	27 October 2019	170	Madrid	Spain	IFEMA Espacio 5.1
3 September 2021	9 January 2022	131	Los Angeles	United States	Vogue Multicultural Museum
4 November 2022	2 April 2023	123	Montreal	Canada	Arsenal art contemporain
16 June 2023	1 October 2023	107	Toronto	Canada	Better Living Centre
10 September 2024	17 November 2024	68	Buenos Aires	Argentina	Pabellón Frers – La Rural
