= Biding My Time =

Song by Pink Floyd

from the album Relics
- Released: 14 May 1971
- Recorded: 9 July 1969
- Length: 5:18
- Label: Starline (Original); MFP (Reissue) (UK); Harvest/Capitol (US)
- Songwriter: Roger Waters
- Producer: Norman Smith

"Biding My Time" is a song written by Pink Floyd bassist Roger Waters.

== Prior performance and recording ==
Prior to the Relics compilation album, "Biding My Time" was an unreleased recording that was recorded during the Ummagumma sessions in 1969. The composition was heard only by fans who attended concerts where the band performed their early concept piece, The Man and The Journey, where the song appeared under the title "Afternoon". During the song a trombone can be heard which is played by keyboardist Rick Wright. The lyrics talk about the narrator "wasting his time", "resting his mind", and spending time with a woman he loves and forgetting the "bad days" when they both "was "workin' from nine to five".

== Personnel ==
- Roger Waters – lead vocals, bass guitar
- David Gilmour – acoustic and electric guitars
- Richard Wright – piano, trombone, Hammond organ
- Nick Mason – drums, percussion
