= The Man and The Journey =

Music performed in concert by Pink Floyd

The Man and The Journey is a suite of music by Pink Floyd, performed in concert during The Man and The Journey Tour in 1969. It consisted of several of their early songs, some unreleased songs, and material later included on More and Ummagumma. The concerts featured visual performance elements such as the sawing and construction of a table, and consumption of afternoon tea onstage. The themes of insanity and everyday life are similar to what would later be explored in the album The Dark Side of the Moon.

== Background ==
The concept was first performed 14 April 1969 at the Royal Festival Hall in a show billed as The Massed Gadgets of Auximenes – More Furious Madness from Pink Floyd. A truncated version of the show was recorded 12 May 1969 for the Top Gear radio programme. The 17 September performance at the Concertgebouw in Amsterdam is the most widely bootlegged of the shows on the tour (however, incomplete) because it was broadcast by radio station VPRO. Plans for an official live album release of The Man and The Journey were considered, but abandoned in favour of Ummagumma.

== Track list and release ==
A live recording of The Man and The Journey was released for the first time in 2016 as part of the boxset, The Early Years 1965–1972, included in the 1969: Dramatis/ation volume. This was recorded in Amsterdam on 17 September 1969. "The End of the Beginning" features Rick Wright playing the Concertgebouw's pipe organ, instead of his Farfisa organ, which was usually used.

The track list for this version is as follows (as given in the Early Years set):

| No. | Title | Length |
|---|---|---|
| 1. | "Daybreak" ("Grantchester Meadows") | 8:14 |
| 2. | "Work" | 4:12 |
| 3. | "Afternoon" ("Biding My Time") | 6:39 |
| 4. | "Doing It" | 3:54 |
| 5. | "Sleeping" | 4:38 |
| 6. | "Nightmare" ("Cymbaline") | 9:15 |
| 7. | "Labyrinth" | 1:10 |
| 8. | "The Beginning" ("Green Is the Colour") | 3:25 |
| 9. | "Beset by Creatures of the Deep" ("Careful with That Axe, Eugene") | 6:27 |
| 10. | "The Narrow Way, Part 3" | 5:11 |
| 11. | "The Pink Jungle" ("Pow R. Toc H.") | 4:56 |
| 12. | "The Labyrinths of Auximines" | 3:20 |
| 13. | "Footsteps" / "Doors" | 3:12 |
| 14. | "Behold the Temple of Light" | 5:32 |
| 15. | "The End of the Beginning" ("A Saucerful of Secrets (Parts III–IV)") | 6:31 |
| Total length: | | 76:35 |

== See also ==
- The Man and The Journey Tour
- List of unreleased songs recorded by Pink Floyd
