= Elfin Oak =

Public artwork in Kensington Gardens, London

Coordinates: 51°30′31.20″N 0°11′16.57″W

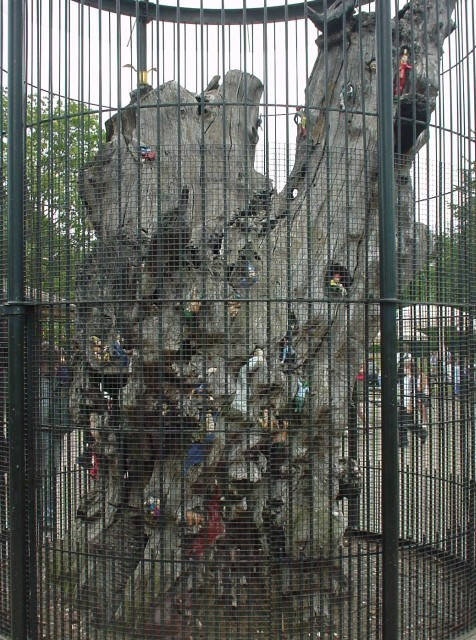
Elfin Oak

The Elfin Oak is the stump of a 900-year-old oak tree located in Kensington Gardens, London, carved and painted to look as though elves, gnomes, fairies and small animals are living in its bark.

The hollow log, donated by Lady Fortescue, originally came from Richmond Park, and was moved to Kensington Gardens in 1928 as part of George Lansbury's scheme of public improvements in London. Over the next two years the illustrator Ivor Innes carved the figures of the "Little People" into it. These included Wookey the witch, with her three jars of health, wealth and happiness, Huckleberry the gnome, carrying a bag of berries up the Gnomes' Stairway to the banquet within Bark Hall, and Grumples and Groodles the Elves, being awakened by Brownie, Dinkie, Rumplelocks and Hereandthere stealing eggs from the crows' nest.

Innes also illustrated a 1930 children's book written by his wife Elsie and based on the Elfin Oak. In it, Elsie wrote:

for centuries now it has been the home of fairies, gnomes, elves, imps, and pixies. In the nooks and crannies they lurk, or peer out of holes and crevices, their natural windows and doorways. It is their hiding-place by day, their revelry place by night, and when the great moon tops the bare branchless tree the Elfin Clans come out to play and frolic in the moonlight.

The inside cover of Pink Floyd's 1969 album Ummagumma features a picture of David Gilmour in front of the Elfin Oak.

The comedian Spike Milligan was a lifelong fan of the tree, and in 1996 personally financed a successful campaign to have it restored. The team was led by sculptor Marcus Richards and a group of art students from Byam Shaw School of Art. Milligan himself personally repainted much of tree. In December 1997 Heritage Minister Tony Banks declared it a Grade II listed structure.

== Detail ==
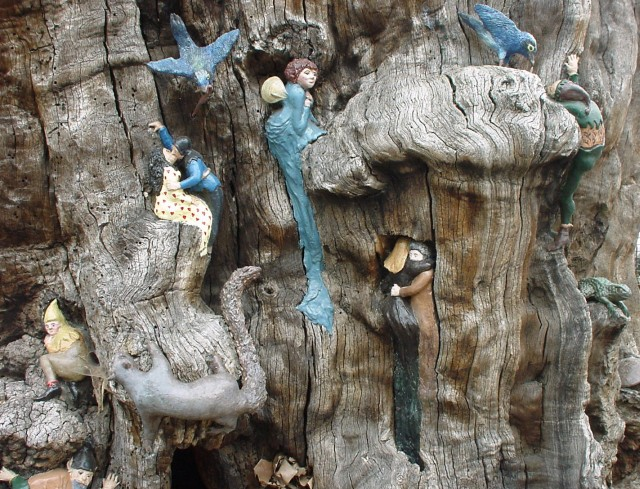
Detail of the tree

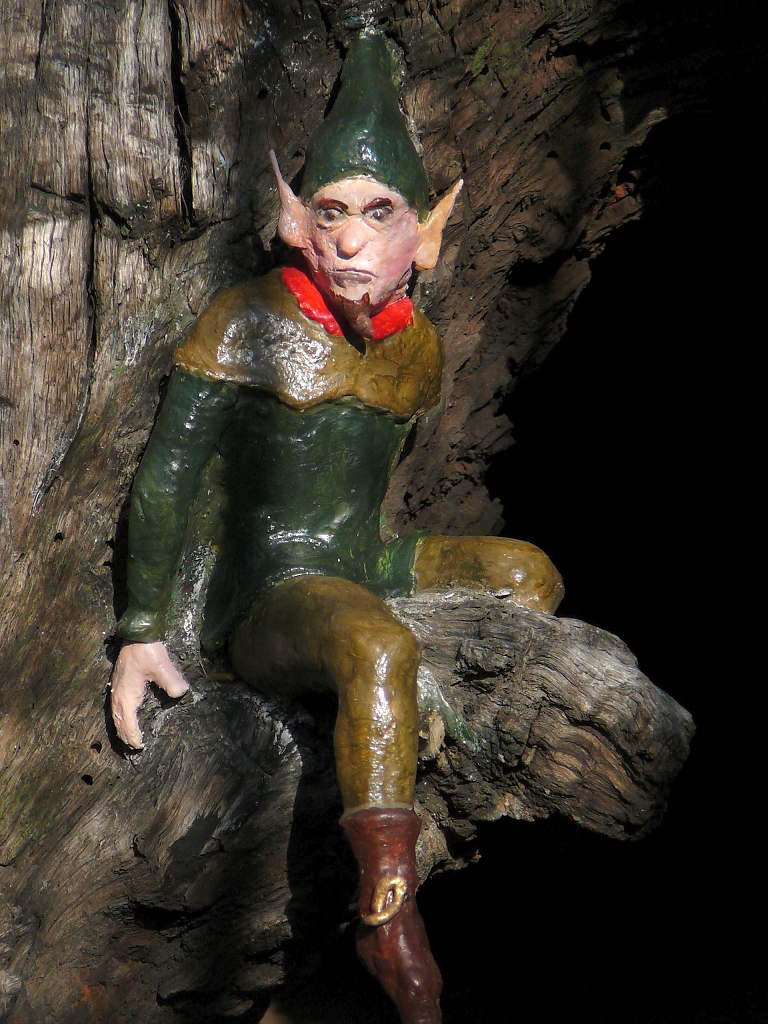
Close-up of a figure on the tree
