= Cymbaline =

Song by Pink Floyd

from the album Soundtrack from the Film More
- Released: 13 June 1969
- Recorded: March 1969
- Genre: Psychedelic rock; psychedelic folk
- Length: 4:49
- Label: EMI Columbia (UK); Tower (US)
- Songwriter: Roger Waters
- Producer: Pink Floyd

"Cymbaline" is a Pink Floyd song from the album Soundtrack from the Film More.

== Lyrics ==
Its lyrics vividly tell the tale of a "nightmare", which was the title of the song when it was first introduced in Floyd's The Man and The Journey Tour shows. The lyrics include a reference to the character Doctor Strange, who was popular at the time due to the psychedelic nature of his adventures and who had appeared on the cover of their previous album A Saucerful of Secrets.

== Recording ==
The recording of "Cymbaline" on the album is different from the one in the film (the latter version is heard on a record player in a bedroom). The vocals are a different take, though both versions are sung by David Gilmour. The lyrics are also different in one place, changing the line "will the tightrope reach the end, will the final couplet rhyme" to "standing by with a book in his hand, and it's P.C. 49".

The song features a sparse arrangement of nylon-string guitar, bass, piano, drums, bongos, and Farfisa organ entering when Gilmour does a scat solo.

The Pink Floyd website credits the woodwind parts (tin whistle or flute) to Nick Mason's wife, Lindy Mason.

Pink Floyd played "Cymbaline" from early 1969 until their last show of 1971, and it was the longest-surviving More piece in the band's live shows. It was dropped from their act along with "Fat Old Sun" and "Embryo" when they began performing Eclipse: A Piece for Assorted Lunatics, an early version of The Dark Side of the Moon.

== Live performances ==
When the band performed the song live, they made the following changes to the song:

- The pace of the song was slower and more deliberate, creating an even more sombre atmosphere than the studio version.
- Richard Wright almost always used Farfisa organ in place of piano (the exception being their performance at KQED studios in San Francisco on April 29, 1970, in which the studio had a piano).
- David Gilmour played electric guitar and performed a guitar solo over where the scat solo occurred in the song.
- In the spring of 1970, the key of the fadeout section was changed from E-minor to B-minor. During this section, Roger Waters would bang a gong instead of bongos as the music faded away. After the B-minor section, the band presented a selection of sound effects such as footsteps and creaking doors, courtesy of the Azimuth Co-ordinator they employed on stage. The effects represented the "nightmare", which would conclude with the sound of a loud explosion. Thanks to the panning sounds created by the Azimuth Co-ordinator, the sounds would surround the audience and the footsteps would move from left to right through the back of the venue.
- By mid-1969/early 1970, the band would follow the instrumental and/or sound effects section with a repeat of the third verse ("The lines converging where you stand...").

== Personnel ==
- David Gilmour – lead vocals, classical guitar
- Richard Wright – Farfisa organ, piano
- Roger Waters – bass guitar
- Nick Mason – drums, bongos

== Covers ==
The song has been covered by fellow English space rock band Hawkwind. The 1996 CD reissue version of their eponymous debut album (1970) includes "Cymbaline" as track 13, in the bonus tracks section.

Fluteplayer Hubert Laws released an instrumental version on his 1969 album Crying Song.

The German progressive rock band RPWL covered the song under the title of "Nightmare" in their 2016 album RPWL Plays Pink Floyd's The Man and the Journey.
