= Embryo (Pink Floyd song) =

Song by Pink Floyd

from the album Picnic – A Breath of Fresh Air
- Released: 1970
- Recorded: 26 November, 3–4 December 1968
- Studio: Abbey Road, London
- Genre: Psychedelic folk, art rock
- Length: 4:39
- Label: Harvest (UK)
- Songwriter: Roger Waters
- Producer: Norman Smith

"Embryo" (sometimes called "The Embryo") is a song by the English rock band Pink Floyd. It was written by Roger Waters, recorded in 1968, and regularly performed live in 1970–71, but never released on any Pink Floyd studio album.

A studio version appeared in 1970 on the Harvest Records sampler Picnic – A Breath of Fresh Air, and also on the 1983 band compilation Works. Live performances expanded on the studio original, stretching beyond ten minutes. Multiple renditions of "Embryo" appeared on the band's 2016 box set The Early Years 1965–1972; two versions were also included on the smaller 2-disc compilation The Early Years 1967–1972: Cre/ation.

== Studio version ==
The studio version of the song was recorded in late 1968 and intended for the album Ummagumma. Roger Waters wrote the music and lyrics, which dealt with an unborn child about to enter the world. David Gilmour sang the lead vocal, while Richard Wright contributed piano and Mellotron. Waters spoke vocal gibberish with his voice sped up in a similar way to his work with Ron Geesin.

The first recording session began on 26 November. The group kept the first take, but replaced it with a new recording on 3 December. Overdubs were recorded the next day, but then the track was abandoned. Gilmour later said, "we all went off it for some reason". The band decided to make the studio half of Ummagumma a series of solo projects, and so the group-recorded "Embryo" was dropped from the running order. A three-minute version, similar to the studio cut, was recorded live at a BBC session in December 1968.

The track was first released on the 1970 multi-artist sampler album Picnic – A Breath of Fresh Air. The record company, Harvest Records obtained clearance from producer Norman Smith to use the track, but the band did not consent to this release and asked the label to remove it. Consequently, the album was withdrawn from sale. It later appeared on the US compilation album Works. It was reissued in 2007 on A Breath of Fresh Air – A Harvest Records Anthology 1969–1974 (one of only three tracks from the original sampler album to be included in the similarly-titled anthology).

"Embryo" was finally granted widespread release in the 2016–2017 Early Years box set. The set includes the original studio recording, the 1968 BBC live session, and two BBC live performances from 1970 and 1971.

== Live performances ==
Pink Floyd regularly played the song in concert in 1970–71. The earliest known performance was on 18 January 1970, at the Fairfield Halls, Croydon, followed by 11 February 1970, at the Town Hall, Birmingham.

Live performances featured a different arrangement from the studio version, which was expanded to include instrumental jamming, lasting between 10 and 25 minutes. The lead vocal was harmonized by Gilmour and Richard Wright, and Gilmour contributed a lead guitar motif between verses. After two verses, Waters led a jam played around a two-bar riff on bass while tape-recorded noises of young children played in the background, which could be panned around the venue using the azimuth co-ordinator. Following this, Gilmour played a "whale song" effect (by reversing the cables on his wah-wah pedal), which would later be used in the song "Echoes". Some live performances included Waters making various squeaks and squeals into his reverberated vocal mic (similar to those in "Several Species of Small Furry Animals Gathered Together in a Cave and Grooving with a Pict").

"Embryo" was recorded for two BBC Radio concerts at the Paris Theatre, London, compered by John Peel. The first one was performed on 16 July 1970 and transmitted three days later. At the concert, Peel complemented the performance of "Embryo", calling it "very hopeful, optimistic music". The second performance was recorded on 30 September 1971 and broadcast on 12 October.

The last time "Embryo" was played was on 20 November 1971 at the conclusion of the band's North American tour in Cincinnati. This final rendition lasted 25 minutes, in part due to technical difficulties onstage that forced the group to keep jamming.

== Personnel ==
Studio version

According to Jean-Michel Guesdon and Philippe Margotin:

- David Gilmour – lead and backing vocals, acoustic guitar, electric guitar
- Richard Wright – piano, Mellotron
- Roger Waters – bass guitar, tape effects (sped-up gibberish)
- Nick Mason – cymbal

Live version

- David Gilmour – co-lead vocals, electric guitar
- Richard Wright – co-lead vocals, Hammond organ
- Roger Waters – bass guitar
- Nick Mason – drums

== Cover versions ==
- A cover of the song, by German psychedelic/Krautrock band Fantasyy Factoryy, appears on the 2001 compilation CD More Relics – A Tribute To Pink Floyd, issued by Sysyphus Records.
