= The Narrow Way =

Song by Pink Floyd

from the album Ummagumma
- Released: 25 October 1969 (UK); 10 November 1969 (US)
- Recorded: 2 May 1969
- Genre: Psychedelic rock, progressive rock, psychedelic folk
- Length: 12:17
- Label: Harvest
- Songwriter: David Gilmour
- Producer: Norman Smith

"The Narrow Way" is the second suite on the studio half of Pink Floyd's fourth album Ummagumma. It is a three-part song written and performed entirely by David Gilmour, using multiple overdubs to play all the instruments himself.

== Different parts ==
Part One (3:27)

Part one of the song was called "Baby Blue Shuffle in D Major" when played by the band in a BBC broadcast on 2 December 1968; it also strongly resembles the tracks "Rain in the Country (take 1)" and "Unknown Song" recorded (but eventually not used) for the soundtrack of Michelangelo Antonioni's film Zabriskie Point in November/December 1969. This portion features layered acoustic guitar with some spacey effects overtop.

Part Two (2:53)

Part two features an electric guitar and percussion which modulate heavily at the end, forming a drone that leads into part three.

Part Three (5:57)

Part three of the song features Gilmour's only vocal contribution to the studio part of the album. This final part was incorporated into The Man and the Journey by the full band on their 1969 tour.

== Personnel ==
- David Gilmour – guitars, vocals, bass, piano, organ, mellotron, drums, percussion
