= Several Species of Small Furry Animals Gathered Together in a Cave and Grooving with a Pict =

Song by Pink Floyd

Song by Pink Floyd

from the album Ummagumma
- Released: 25 October 1969 (UK); 10 November 1969 (US)
- Recorded: 2 May 1969
- Genre: Experimental; musique concrète
- Length: 4:59
- Label: Harvest
- Songwriter: Roger Waters
- Producer: Norman Smith

Official audio
- "Several Species of Small Furry Animals Gathered Together in a Cave and Grooving with a Pict" on YouTube

"Several Species of Small Furry Animals Gathered Together in a Cave and Grooving with a Pict" is a track written and performed by Roger Waters from the 1969 Pink Floyd double album, Ummagumma.

== Sounds and recording ==
Extract from the song
The bulk of the song consists of a variety of tape loops stuck together in different speeds and directions.

The track consists of several minutes of noises resembling rodents and birds simulated by voices, utilizing techniques such as tapping the microphone played at different speeds, followed by Waters providing a few stanzas of spoken word in an exaggerated Scottish burr. This poem was improvised in the studio.

The Picts were the indigenous people of what is now Scotland who merged with the Scots.

There is a hidden message in the song at about 4:32. If played at 16 rpm, Waters can be heard saying, "That was pretty avant-garde, wasn't it?" Playing it at 45 rpm reveals a second message from Waters: "Bring back my guitar."

A small sample of these effects appears at about 4:48 on Waters' other track on Ummagumma, "Grantchester Meadows".

"It's not actually anything, it's a bit of concrete poetry. Those were sounds that I made, the voice and the hand slapping were all human generated – no musical instruments."

— Roger Waters, interview with the University of Regina's The Carillon, October 1970

== In popular culture ==
The title of the Man or Astro-man? song "Many Pieces of Large Fuzzy Mammals Gathered Together at a Rave and Schmoozing with a Brick" is based on this song.

A quotation in the Karl Edward Wagner novel Bloodstone (1975) pays tribute to the song: "several species of small furry animals gathered together in cave and grooving with a pict."

== Personnel ==
Personnel per Paul Stump.

- Roger Waters – voices, tape effects
- David Gilmour - high-pitched voice
