= A Saucerful of Secrets (instrumental) =

Instrumental by Pink Floyd

from the album A Saucerful of Secrets
- Released: 29 June 1968
- Recorded: April – May 1968
- Studio: Abbey Road Studios, London
- Genre: Avant-garde
- Length: 11:57 (A Saucerful of Secrets version); 12:48 (Ummagumma version); 12:46 (Live at Pompeii version)
- Label: EMI Columbia (UK); Tower (US)
- Songwriters: Roger Waters; David Gilmour; Nick Mason; Richard Wright
- Producer: Norman Smith

"A Saucerful of Secrets" is a multi-part instrumental composition by English rock band Pink Floyd from their 1968 album of the same name. It is nearly 12 minutes long and was composed by Roger Waters, Richard Wright, Nick Mason and David Gilmour. The track features guitar feedback, a percussion solo section and wordless vocals.

== Background ==
The track was composed by Roger Waters and Nick Mason drawing an architectural diagram for how the music should progress. David Gilmour later said he initially wasn't sure what to play. Waters remarked it was the first thing the group had recorded after Syd Barrett's departure that was any good.

The group split the track into three sections that could be recorded independently and subsequently mixed together. Recording began on April 3 on the first two parts of track, which was re-recorded two days later. A first attempt at the third section was made at this time, but re-recorded on 9 April, with overdubs added the next day. The whole piece was mixed on 23-24 April and 1 May.

The song was Gilmour's first songwriting credit with Pink Floyd. On the original vinyl and early CD issues, his name was misspelled as "Gilmore". This was corrected with the remastered version released in 1994.

== Structure ==
Although the song is listed on all pressings of the album as "A Saucerful of Secrets", some pressings of Ummagumma break the piece into four different sections. The first part, "Something Else", was logged as "Richard's Rave Up" when the song was recorded at EMI Studios. The second part was recorded as "Nick's Boogie" before being retitled as "Syncopated Pandemonium", while the last part is titled "Celestial Voices". Waters once stated that the song was about a battle and the aftermath. "Something Else" represents the setup of the battle. "Syncopated Pandemonium" represents the actual battle. "Storm Signal" represents the view of the dead after the battle has ended, and "Celestial Voices" represents the mourning of the dead.

The first part, "Something Else" was based around the sound of a closely miked cymbal, recording frequencies that are lost when struck with force. It also included prepared piano, Farfisa organ, Mellotron and various manipulated voices. The second part, "Syncopated Panedemonium" centered on a drum loop. On top of this the group recorded cymbals recorded backwards, and piano. Gilmour recorded his part by running a leg from a microphone stand across the guitar fretboard. The third movement, "Storm Signal" / "Celestial Voices" features Richard Wright on Hammond organ.

== Live performances ==
Pink Floyd performed the work live regularly from 1968 to 1972. It was titled "The Massed Gadgets of Hercules" in its earliest performances.

Live performances of the song differed significantly from the studio version. The closely miked cymbal sound that starts the piece was instead performed as a two-note drone on the bass. For the "Syncopated Pandemonium" section, Richard Wright usually played his Farfisa organ instead of pounding the keys on a grand piano with his fists as on the studio recording (the version on Pompeii being an exception), and Roger Waters would smash on a gong. The "Celestial Voices" section started with just organ as per the studio version, but the band gradually added drums, bass, guitar, and wordless vocals provided by Gilmour.

A live version of the track is available on their 1969 double album Ummagumma, and an alternative version is seen and heard in the film Pink Floyd: Live at Pompeii, which was performed at the director Adrian Maben's request, as he thought it would be a good addition to the film. It was performed occasionally as an encore in 1972, with the last performance on 23 September 1972 at the Winterland Auditorium, San Francisco, California. Mason and Wright briefly considered resurrecting the instrumental for the 1987 Momentary Lapse of Reason tour, but Gilmour suggested that it sounded too archaic.

"Syncopated Pandemonium", the second part of the track, was one of the many tracks that were played at some point or another as "Doing It" (part of the conceptual concert The Man and The Journey, the focus of their 1969 tour). Others include "The Grand Vizier's Garden Party (Entertainment)", "Up the Khyber", "Party Sequence". All of these prominently feature drums.

The "Celestial Voices" section was used as the finale to The Man and the Journey concept suite, renamed to "The End of the Beginning". At a performance of the suite on 26 June 1969 at the Royal Albert Hall, Pink Floyd were joined by a full brass band and choir for the piece. Wright played the Royal Albert Hall pipe organ.

Mason revived the track for Nick Mason's Saucerful of Secrets shows from 2018 onwards. A recording is included on their 2020 live album Live at the Roundhouse.

== Personnel ==
- David Gilmour – slide guitar, vocals
- Richard Wright – Farfisa organ, Hammond organ, Mellotron, piano, vibraphone, vocals
- Roger Waters – bass guitar, cymbals, vocals
- Nick Mason – drums, chimes

== Cultural references ==
- The album The Dark Side of the Moog II (1994) by Klaus Schulze and Pete Namlook is subtitled "A Saucerful of Ambience".

== Bibliography ==
- Guesdon, Jean-Michel; Margotin, Philippe (2017). Pink Floyd All the Songs – The Story Behind Every Track. Running Press. ISBN 978-0-316-43923-7.
