= Umma gumma =

Scientific classification
- Kingdom: Animalia
- Phylum: Arthropoda
- Class: Insecta
- Order: Odonata
- Suborder: Zygoptera
- Family: Calopterygidae
- Genus: Umma
- Species: U. gumma

Binomial name
- Umma gumma Dijkstra, Mézière & Kipping, 2015

Species of damselfly

Umma gumma is a species of damselfly in the family Calopterygidae. The genus name was established in 1890 and this species described in 2015 from Africa was found to belong to the genus. The species was named after the Pink Floyd album Ummagumma.
