= Pink Floyd pigs =

Inflatable flying pigs used as props by Pink Floyd

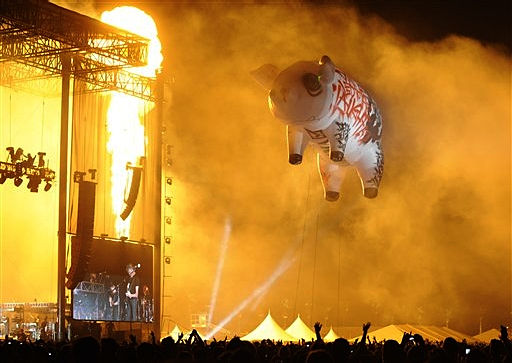
The giant inflatable pig of The Dark Side of the Moon Live tour at Coachella Music Festival in April 2008.

Inflatable flying pigs were one of the staple props of Pink Floyd's live shows. The first balloon was a sow, with a male pig balloon later introduced in their 1987 tour. Pigs appeared numerous times in concerts by the band, promoting concerts and record releases, and on the cover of their 1977 album Animals.

The image rights for the pigs passed to Roger Waters when he split from the rest of the group, though the pigs continued to be used by both Pink Floyd and Roger Waters in their gigs after his departure.

== Animals ==
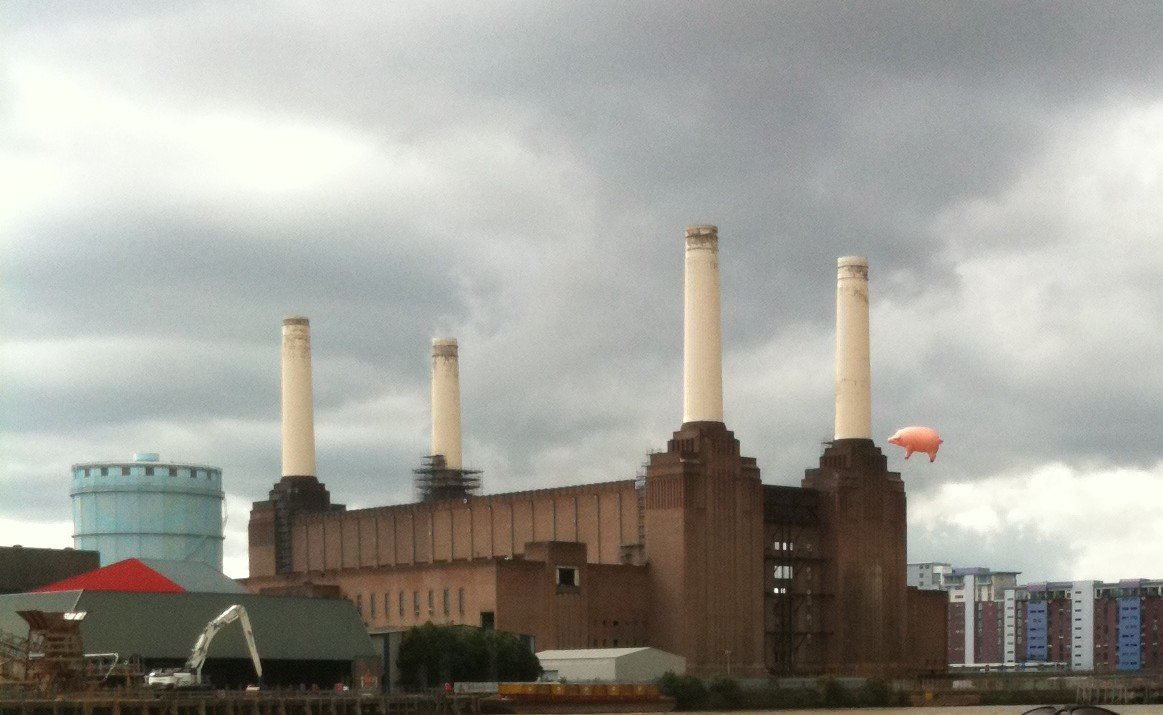
Algie replica flying over the Battersea Power Station on 26 September 2011

The original Pink Floyd pig, a 12-metre (40 ft), helium-filled balloon, was designed by Roger Waters and built in December 1976 by the artist Jeffrey Shaw with help of design team Hipgnosis, in preparation for shooting the cover of the Animals album. Plans were made to fly it over Battersea Power Station for a three-day photo-shoot, with a marksman standing by to shoot the pig down if it broke free. On the first day, poor weather and delays meant the pig was not launched, and the marksman was told he was not needed.

On the second day, 3 December 1976, the marksman was not present because no one had told him to return. A gust of wind tore the pig loose. It disappeared from sight within five minutes, and was spotted by airline pilots at thirty thousand feet in the air. Flights at Heathrow Airport were cancelled as the huge inflatable pig continued eastwards across flight lanes and out over the English Channel, finally landing that night on a farm in Kent, where it frightened a herd of cows.

The pig was recovered and repaired for the resumption of photography for the album cover, but the sky was cloudless and blue, thus "boring". However, the pictures of the sky from the first day were deemed suitable, so the album cover was created using a composite of photos from the first and third days.

The pig that was originally floated above Battersea Power Station was called "Algie".

== Use in the In the Flesh & The Wall tours ==
After the album Animals was released in 1977, Pink Floyd began their In the Flesh tour. During concerts, the pig appeared around the PA stacks in a cloud of black smoke during performances of "Pigs (Three Different Ones)". The pig also appeared during each of Pink Floyd's The Wall concerts, black instead of pink, with a crossed hammers logo on its side. Waters would often refer to it directly before "Run Like Hell" (the pig appeared during the end of the previous song, "In the Flesh"). A short speech in reference to the pig and/or the song was given in every show, with each speech being different; this oddity has been used by bootleggers to identify which date a recording of the Wall tour was made. At the Berlin concert, it was only the head and it had fangs and red eyes.

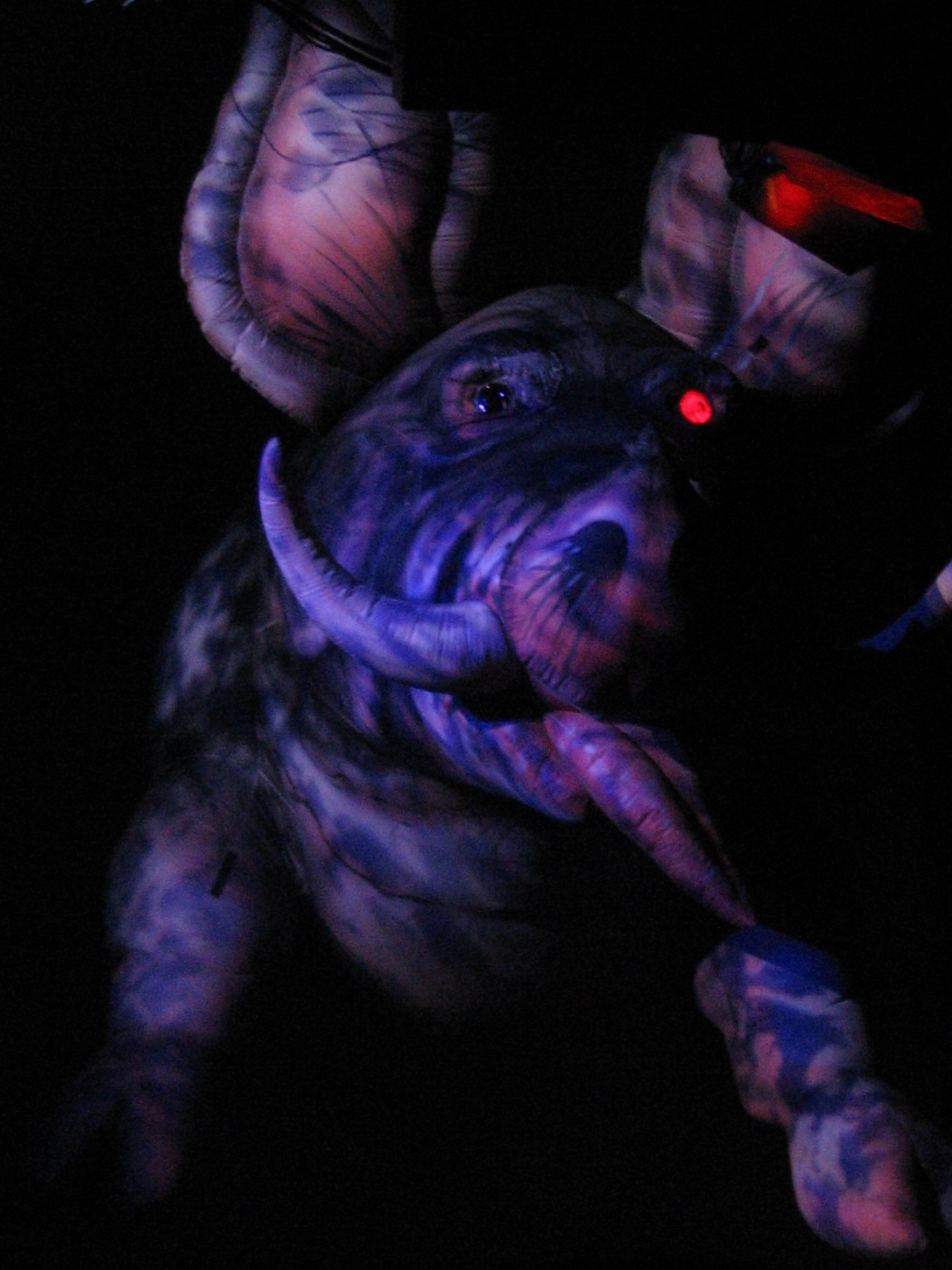
Backdrop from a Pink Floyd tour

== Pink Floyd's use of the pig post-Roger Waters ==
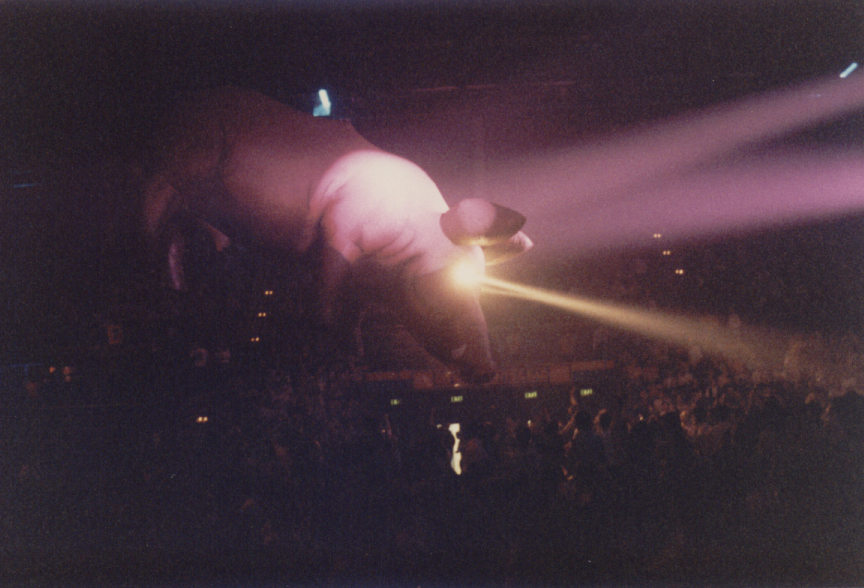
Pink Floyd concert at Docklands Arena, July 1989

For the 1987–1989 tour, the band added testicles to the pig, which David Gilmour has said was an attempt to get around Roger Waters having the image rights for the pig.

The pig briefly appeared on 10 June 1988 at Beaujoire stadium in Nantes, France; it flew above the crowd for a very short time, after which it was seen to deflate.

The pig is shown to be flown over the audience during the performance of "One of These Days" in the Delicate Sound of Thunder concert video, where it appears black with illuminated eyes.

Pink Floyd added a 'deflated' pig to Roger Waters' auction of animation art from the film The Wall at Christie's London, on 21 September 1990, but the lot was withdrawn before the auction started.

During the 1994 tour, two warthog-like pigs with protruding tongues were shown at the top of the stage side's speaker towers, sometimes just deflated, sometimes dropped on the ground after "One of These Days". This was also during Pulse, but for the VHS, Laserdisc, DVD and Blu-Ray releases, footage of the pigs falling was edited out.

The pig made another appearance before the release of Echoes: The Best of Pink Floyd, when Capitol Records flew a replica of the original pig from Animals over the Capitol Records Tower in Hollywood, California.

One damaged inflatable pig, believed to be from the 1988 Pink Floyd tour, was repaired by Nga Keith and flown again over a concert by the band The String Cheese Incident in Austin, Texas on 20 September 2003. Reportedly purchased by The String Cheese Incident manager Mike Luba from a former Pink Floyd stagehand, the 40-foot pig flew again over the Austin City Limits Music Festival audience during a cover of Pink Floyd's "Another Brick in the Wall (Part II)".

During their Live 8 reunion with Waters, footage of Algie, over Battersea Power Station, was shown on a giant video screen behind the band.

A replica of Algie was tethered above Battersea Power Station on 26 September 2011 to promote the Why Pink Floyd...? campaign, involving the reissue of the band's first 14 studio albums.

== Roger Waters solo tours ==
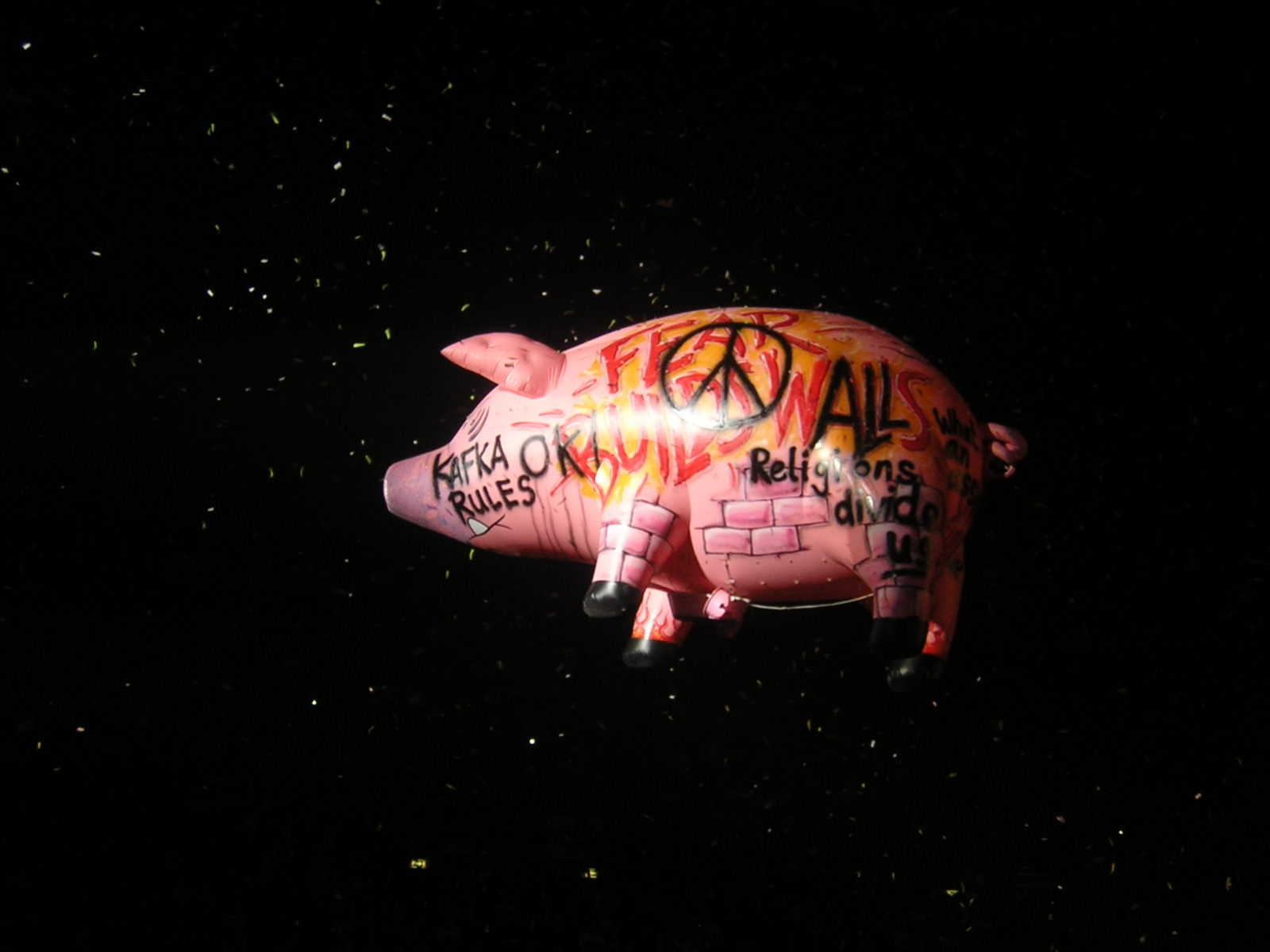
An inflatable pig released at the Roger Waters show in June 2007.

- During a concert in Summerfest 2006, the pig had a message printed on it reading "Impeach Bush".
- In a concert in Argentina on 2007, a pig flew and ended up on the Río de la Plata.
- At Argentina tour dates in 2007, the pig had the "Nunca Más" (Never again) inscription on its chest, referring to the famous slogan with which the Argentine people referred to the 1976-1983 military dictatorship during which 30,000 people were forcibly disappeared and later assassinated.
- During Waters' performance at the 2008 Coachella Festival, one of the giant inflatable pigs being used as a prop became untethered and floated away into the California desert. Organizers of the festival had offered a $10,000 reward plus free lifetime tickets to the festival in return for the pig's recovery. The pig was found three days later at a nearby country club.
- Likewise, during the concert in Dallas, TX on 2 May 2008, and Houston, TX on 4 May, the pig floated away.
- During a concert in Chicago on 8 June 2012 at Wrigley Field, the pig crashed into the crowd behind home plate and was ripped to pieces by the crowd.
- During his Us + Them tour in 2017, the pig had a message printed on it reading "PIGGY BANK OF WAR" and underneath printed "BOMBS AND DEATH COME FROM HERE" with an arrow pointed toward the pig's rear.
- During Waters' This Is Not a Drill tour in 2022, the pig was printed with "FUCK THE POOR" on one side and "STEAL FROM THE POOR GIVE TO THE RICH" on the other side and was decorated with various images such as drones, coffins, and fighter-jets. The pig was flown during the intermission and the first few numbers of the second set; its eyes were covered by a mask representing the Meta logo and were illuminated red during the performances of "In the Flesh" and "Run Like Hell."

== Other media ==
- An inflatable pig can be seen floating above Battersea Power Station in the 2010 movie Nanny McPhee Returns as the nanny and children make a motorcycle trip to London to locate the children's father.
- An inflatable pig can also be seen floating outside Battersea Power Station in the 2006 movie Children of Men.
- During the "Isles of Wonder" short film shot by Danny Boyle and shown as part of the Opening Ceremonies of the 2012 Summer Olympics in London, the camera zooms down the length of the Thames River, from a small spring in the countryside all the way to the Olympic venue. During the fly-by, a pig can be seen floating above the Battersea Power Station.
- The pig can be seen floating about the neighbourhood in the video game The Sims 2.
- An inflatable pig can be seen floating above Battersea Power Station in the Zwift cycling app.
- A large toy sheep above a power plant reminiscent of the Battersea Power Station is shown on the cover of The Orb album Live 93.
- A floating pig can be seen in the "Roger Waters – Comfortably Numb 2022" video, released 18 November 2022.
