= Mothers (music venue) =

Music venue in Erdington, England

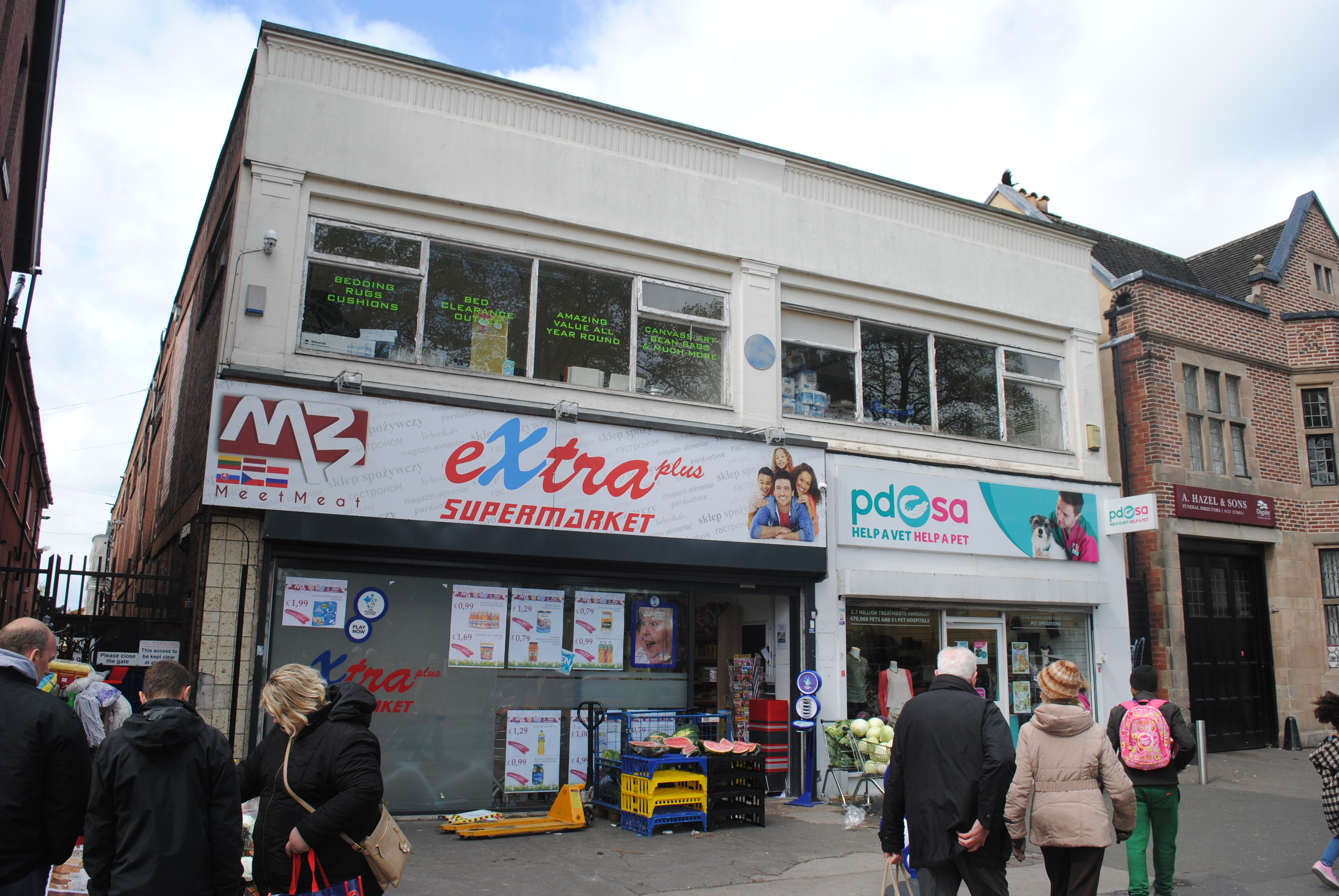
- The building on 27 April 2019, the 50th anniversary of the concert recorded for Pink Floyd's Ummagumma album.
- Interactive map of Mothers
- Former names: Carlton Ballroom
- Address: High Street
- Location: Erdington, Birmingham, England
- Coordinates: 52.523195°N 1.840335°W
- Owner: John Singer; John 'Spud' Taylor; Phil Myatt
- Type: Music venue

Construction
- Opened: 9 August 1968
- Closed: 3 January 1971

Mothers (formerly the Carlton Ballroom) was a club in the Erdington district of Birmingham, England, during the late 1960s and early 1970s. It opened above an old furniture store in Erdington High Street on 9 August 1968. The club, run by John Singer, John 'Spud' Taylor and promoter Phil Myatt, closed its doors on 3 January 1971. Between those dates more than 400 acts performed there, many of whom went on to great success.

Well-known live recordings made in Mothers include those released by Pink Floyd on Ummagumma, recorded on 27 April 1969, and parts of "Facelift" by Soft Machine, released on Third, recorded on 11 January 1970.

Rory Gallagher's band Taste played regularly, and The Who performed their rock opera Tommy there. Traffic's debut took place at the club, and fledgling heavy metal bands like Deep Purple, Judas Priest (whose vocalist Rob Halford mentions Mothers in a song on his 2000 solo album Resurrection) and Black Sabbath played some of their earliest gigs there.

Some of the other well-known rock bands and artists to play Mothers include: Family, Fleetwood Mac, John Mayall's Bluesbreakers, Eclection, Edgar Broughton Band, Free, Roy Harper, Blodwyn Pig, Strawbs, Quintessence, Steppenwolf, the Deviants, Jethro Tull, Jon Hiseman's Colosseum, Skid Row (with Gary Moore), the Nice, Tyrannosaurus Rex, Elton John, King Crimson, Led Zeppelin, The Chicago Transit Authority, Moby Grape, Canned Heat (there is a reference to the club in the sleeve notes of their 1969 compilation Canned Heat Cookbook), Grateful Dead, Moody Blues and the Bonzo Dog Doo-Dah Band.

While returning home to London from a performance at Mothers on 12 May 1969, Fairport Convention's van crashed on the M1 motorway, killing drummer Martin Lamble, 19, and Jeannie Franklyn, guitarist Richard Thompson's girlfriend. The rest of the band suffered injuries of varying severity.

Mothers was voted the number one rock venue in the world by America's Billboard magazine. John Peel, a regular DJ at the club, was quoted as saying: "People are amazed to hear that for a few years the best club in Britain was in Erdington."

Roy Harper later told Brum Beat magazine:

That was the first club outside London that meant anything at all and that's why there's been this long association with Birmingham. I played there about six times between 1968 and 1970. I have always enjoyed playing here.

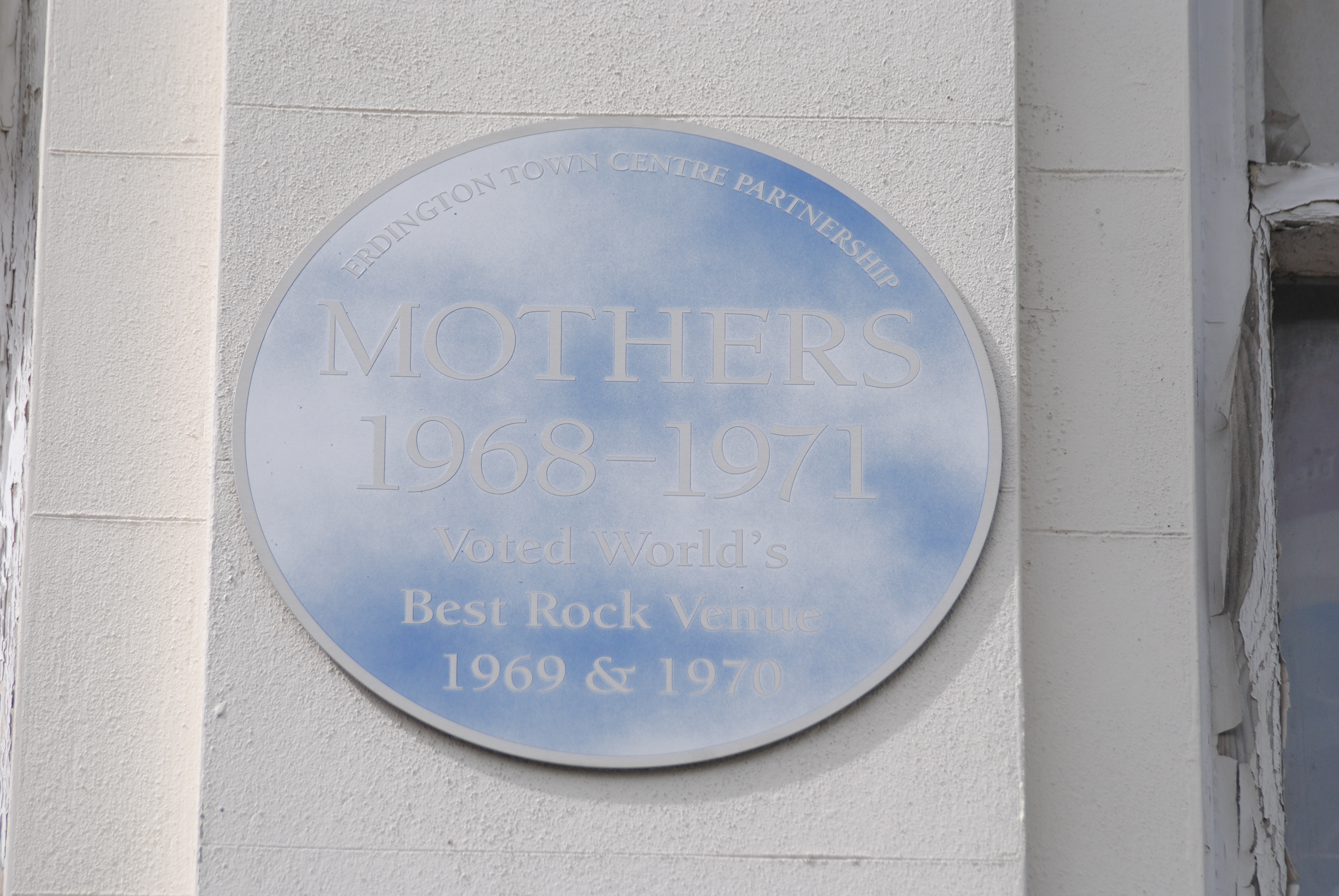
The blue plaque, colours fading, seen in April 2019

A blue plaque was unveiled at the former Mothers building on 13 July 2013.
