= Pow R. Toc H. =

Instrumental by Pink Floyd

from the album The Piper at the Gates of Dawn
- Released: 5 August 1967
- Recorded: March–April 1967
- Studio: Abbey Road, London, UK
- Genre: Experimental
- Length: 4:26
- Label: EMI Columbia (UK); Tower (US)
- Songwriters: Syd Barrett; Roger Waters; Richard Wright; Nick Mason
- Producer: Norman Smith

Official audio
- "Pow R. Toc H." on YouTube

"Pow R. Toc H." is an instrumental, with vocal effects, by the English rock band Pink Floyd on their 1967 album The Piper at the Gates of Dawn. It is the band’s first instrumental. In addition to the vocal effects, the piano is a prominent instrument in the piece.

== Background ==
Toc H. was the army signallers' code for "TH", representing Talbot House, a club where officers and enlisted men were equals, which later became an interdenominational Christian fellowship organization serving the community.

According to Nick Mason, the original four members of Pink Floyd (Syd Barrett, Roger Waters, Richard Wright and Nick Mason) were present at Abbey Road Studios and watched the Beatles record "Lovely Rita" from Sgt. Pepper's Lonely Hearts Club Band. Voice effects and noises similar to those used in "Lovely Rita" could be heard in "Pow R. Toc H.", recorded in the next studio during the same period.

Waters also uses the "scream" he later used in "Careful with That Axe, Eugene".

== Alternative and live versions ==
"Pow R. Toc H." was renamed "The Pink Jungle" in the "Journey" part of The Man and The Journey. Pink Floyd performed the song live from 1967 to 1969.

== Personnel ==
- Syd Barrett – acoustic guitar, electric guitars, vocal percussion
- Roger Waters – bass guitar, screams
- Richard Wright – Farfisa organ, piano, additional vocalisations
- Nick Mason – drums, percussion
