= Grantchester Meadows (song) =

1969 song by Pink Floyd

Song by Pink Floyd

from the album Ummagumma
- Released: 25 October 1969 (UK); 10 November 1969 (US)
- Recorded: 2 May 1969
- Genre: Psychedelic folk, experimental
- Length: 7:26
- Label: Harvest
- Songwriter: Roger Waters
- Producer: Norman Smith

Official audio
- "Grantchester Meadows" (2011 Remastered Version) on YouTube

"Grantchester Meadows" is the second track from the studio disc of the 1969 Pink Floyd album Ummagumma.

== Composition ==
The song was written and performed entirely by Roger Waters. The song features his lyrics accompanied by an acoustic guitar, while a tape loop of a skylark sings in the background throughout the entire song. At approximately 4:13, the sound of a honking Bewick's swan is introduced, followed by the sound of it taking off from water. As the instrumental track fades out, a fly which has been heard buzzing throughout the song, is chased after by an unidentified person (represented by the sound of footsteps) and finally swatted, cutting abruptly to the next track.

This song was one of several to be considered for, but ultimately excluded from, the band's "best of" album, Echoes: The Best of Pink Floyd. A live version of the song was released as the first single to promote The Early Years 1965–1972 box set in 2016.

== Lyrics ==
The lyrics describe a pastoral and dream-like scene at Grantchester Meadows in Cambridgeshire, close to where fellow band member David Gilmour lived at the time. This type of pastoral ballad was typical of Roger Waters' compositional approach in the late sixties and early seventies. It was a style that he was to continue on his first album outside of Pink Floyd – Music from "The Body" (in collaboration with Ron Geesin) – and "If" from Atom Heart Mother. It is one of several Pink Floyd songs that praise the British countryside.

== Sound ==
The song is noted for its use of stereo effects and sound panning to create an illusion of space and depth.

== Live ==
"Grantchester Meadows" was incorporated into Pink Floyd's The Man and The Journey concert suite as "Daybreak". It was performed live during the 1970 US tour, often opening the show. Live renditions of the song included Gilmour on a second acoustic guitar and providing vocals during the chorus, as well as Richard Wright playing two piano solos—one after the second verse's chorus and one during the coda (these solos were later played on the Farfisa organ).

== Personnel ==
- Roger Waters – acoustic guitars, vocals, tape effects

Additional live personnel

- David Gilmour – second acoustic guitar, chorus vocals
- Richard Wright – piano, later Farfisa organ
