= Ummagumma =

1969 album by Pink Floyd

Studio album / Live album by Pink Floyd
- Released: 7 November 1969
- Recorded: September 1968 – July 1969 (studio); 27 April and 2 May 1969 (live)
- Venues: Mothers Club, Birmingham; Manchester College of Commerce, Manchester
- Studios: EMI, London
- Genres: Experimental; avant-garde; psychedelic rock; progressive rock; space rock
- Length: 86:32; 39:24 (live album); 46:51 (studio album)
- Label: Harvest
- Producers: Pink Floyd; Norman Smith

Pink Floyd chronology
More (1969)	Ummagumma (1969)	Atom Heart Mother (1970)

Ummagumma is a part-studio, part-live album by the English rock band Pink Floyd. It is a double album and was released on 7 November 1969 by Harvest Records. The first disc consists of live recordings from concerts at Mothers Club in Birmingham and the College of Commerce in Manchester that contained part of their normal set list of the time, while the second contains solo tracks by each member of the band recorded at EMI Studios, counting as Pink Floyd's fourth studio album. The artwork was designed by regular Pink Floyd collaborators Hipgnosis and features a number of pictures of the band combined to give a Droste effect.

The album's title supposedly comes from Cambridge slang for sex, commonly used by Pink Floyd friend and occasional roadie Iain "Emo" Moore, who would say, "I'm going back to the house for some ummagumma". According to Moore, he made up the term himself. Drummer Nick Mason later said the album was so titled "because it sounded interesting and nice".

Although Ummagumma was well received at the time of release, and was a top-five hit in the UK album charts, it has since been looked upon unfavourably by critics and by the band, who have expressed lukewarm opinions about it in interviews. The album has been reissued on CD several times, along with the rest of their catalogue.

== Background and recording ==
Several Species of Small Furry Animals Gathered Together in a Cave and Grooving with a Pict
This song on the studio disc featured a variety of vocal and percussion effects sped up, slowed down, reversed, and spliced together.

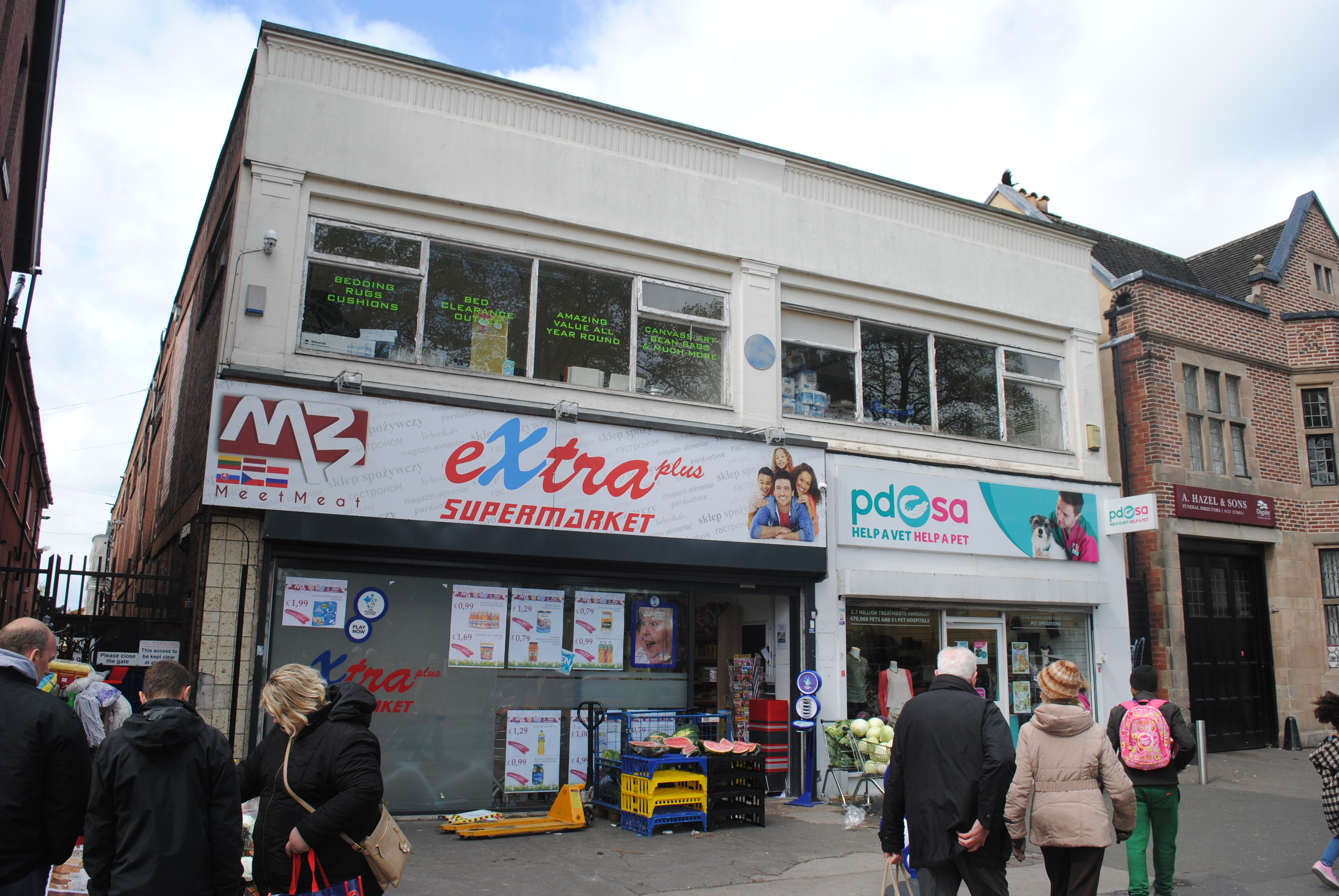
The site of Mothers Club, above shops in Birmingham's Erdington suburb, where some of the live album was recorded (seen on 27 April 2019 – the 50th anniversary of the concert). Note blue plaque commemorating the venue.

The original idea behind the live album was to feature fan favourites that would subsequently be dropped from the set. Although the sleeve notes say that the live material was recorded in June 1969, the live album of Ummagumma was recorded live at Mothers Club in Birmingham on 27 April 1969 and at Manchester College of Commerce on 2 May as part of The Man and The Journey Tour. Keyboardist Richard Wright later said the recording of "A Saucerful of Secrets" was a composite from both gigs. A show at Bromley Technical College on 26 April was also recorded but not used. The band had also recorded a live version of "Interstellar Overdrive" (from The Piper at the Gates of Dawn) intended for placement on side one of the live album, and "Embryo", which was recorded in the studio before it was decided that the band members each come up with their own material.

The studio album was recorded in stages between September 1968 and July 1969. The structure came as a result of Wright wanting to make "real music", where the four group members (in order: Wright, Roger Waters, David Gilmour and Mason) each had half an LP side to create a solo work without involvement from the others. Wright's contribution, "Sysyphus", was named after a character in Greek mythology, usually spelled "Sisyphus", and contained a combination of various keyboards, including piano and Mellotron. Although initially enthusiastic about making a solo contribution, Wright later described it as "pretentious".

Waters' "Grantchester Meadows" was a more pastoral acoustic offering that referred back to his youth in the Cambridge suburbs. It originated from an instrumental piece that had been occasionally performed live and was usually played as an opening to concerts during 1969, with vocals. His other track, "Several Species of Small Furry Animals Gathered Together in a Cave and Grooving with a Pict", contained a variety of vocal and percussion effects treated at various speeds, both forwards and backwards, and was influenced by Ron Geesin, who would later collaborate with both Waters and Pink Floyd. The two tracks were bridged by the sound of a fly being swatted.

Gilmour has since stated he was apprehensive about creating a solo work, and admits he "went into a studio and started waffling about, tacking bits and pieces together", although part one of "The Narrow Way" had already been performed as "Baby Blue Shuffle in D Major" in a BBC radio session in December 1968. Gilmour said he "just bullshitted" through the piece. He asked Waters to write some lyrics for his pieces, but Waters refused to do so. The third part of the suite was briefly performed live in early 1969.

Mason's three-part "The Grand Vizier's Garden Party" featured his then wife, Lindy, playing a flute solo on the first and third parts, the latter using overdub. She was not credited. The seven-minute second part incorporated percussion, tape effects and drum soloing. Although this track was not performed live, a similar drum solo, "Doing It", was incorporated into The Man live suite.

== Style ==
According to Bruce Eder of AllMusic, the album is "more experimental" than previous releases by Pink Floyd, and "each member [gets] a certain amount of space on the record to make [their] own music".

== Artwork and packaging ==
The album was the first album by the band released on the Harvest label. The cover artwork shows a Droste effect featuring the group, with a picture hanging on the wall showing the same scene, except that the band members have switched positions, and this is then repeated two more times. On most older editions, in the very center of the Droste pattern is a tiny rendering of the band's previous LP A Saucerful of Secrets; newer editions depict the Droste pattern repeating indefinitely. The cover of the original LP varies between the British, United States, Canadian and Australian releases. The British version has the Gigi soundtrack album leaning against the wall immediately above the "Pink Floyd" letters. Storm Thorgerson explained that the album was introduced as a red herring to provoke debate, and that it has no intended meaning. On most copies of US and Canadian editions, the Gigi cover is airbrushed to a plain white sleeve, apparently because of copyright concerns, but the earliest US copies do show the Gigi cover, and it was restored for the US remastered CD edition. On the Australian edition, the Gigi cover is completely airbrushed, not even leaving a white square behind. The house used as the location for the front cover of the album is located in Great Shelford, near Cambridge.

On the rear cover, roadies Alan Styles (who also appears in "Alan's Psychedelic Breakfast") and Peter Watts are shown with the band's equipment laid out on a taxiway at London Biggin Hill Airport. This concept was proposed by Mason, with the intention of replicating the "exploded" drawings of military aircraft and their payloads, which were popular at the time. The inner gatefold art shows separate black-and-white photos of the band members. Gilmour is seen standing in front of the Elfin Oak. Original vinyl editions showed Waters with his first wife, Judy Trim, but she has been cropped out of the picture on most CD editions (with the original photo's caption "Roger Waters (and Jude)" accordingly changed to just "Roger Waters"). The uncropped picture was restored for the album's inclusion in the box set Oh, by the Way.

On the US and Canadian release there are additional titles of the four sections of the song "A Saucerful of Secrets". These titles did not appear on British editions, nor on any copies of the earlier album A Saucerful of Secrets.

== Release history ==
Ummagumma was released in the UK and US on 7 and 8 November 1969, respectively. It reached number 5 on the UK albums chart and number 74 in the US, marking the first time the band reached the top 100 there. Similarly in Canada, it was their first appearance on the charts, reaching number 78. The album was certified gold in the US in February 1974 and platinum in March 1994. US versions of the cassette retained only "Astronomy Domine" from the live set and omitted the three other tracks. In 1987, the album was re-released on a two-CD set. A digitally remastered version was issued in 1994.

In 2009, to mark the 40th anniversary of the album's release, Thorgerson sold a limited number of autographed lithographs of the front cover.

In 2011, it was reissued featuring a remastered version with various other material. Although the 2011 re-release campaign Why Pink Floyd...? presented all fourteen albums newly remastered in 2011, only the studio disc of Ummagumma was remastered – the live disc is the previous 1994 version. Both the live and studio album were re-issued in 2016 with Pink Floyd Records label.

== Reception and legacy ==
Professional ratings
Review scores
Source	Rating
AllMusic	3.5/5 stars
The Daily Telegraph	3/5 stars
The Great Rock Discography	7/10
Encyclopedia of Popular Music	2/5 stars
MusicHound	2.5/5
Paste	5.0/10
The Rolling Stone Album Guide	2.5/5 stars
Sputnikmusic	4/5
Tom Hull	B

On release, Ummagumma received favourable reviews. International Times was particularly positive about the live album, with the reviewer describing it as "probably one of the best live recordings I have ever heard". Stylus Magazine was very positive towards the album, saying the live album was "as a visceral document of the early Floyd's proclivity for atmospheric, energetic jamming, there's nothing else like it" and that the studio one "somehow transcends its fractured construction to make a full album-length statement".

However, retrospective reviewers have given it mixed-to-negative ratings. Rolling Stone and MusicHound each awarded the album a score of 2.5 out of 5, while Paste, reviewing the 2011 re-release, described the album as "rock excess of the worst kind", although the writer praised the live version of "Careful with that Axe, Eugene". In his review for the Pink Floyd studio album Atom Heart Mother (1970), Robert Christgau suggested that Ummagumma's "hypnotic melodies" made it "an admirable record to fall asleep to". Paul Stump, in his book The Music's All that Matters: A History of Progressive Rock, approved of the first disc for its "often involvingly spiritual live improvisation", while deriding most of the studio disc, going so far as to liken "Sysyphus" to "an excitable two-year-old let loose on the bass end of a piano keyboard". However, he praised both of Waters's solo contributions and the editing and splicing techniques used on "The Grand Vizier's Tea Party". Bradley Smith's The Billboard Guide to Progressive Music (1997) recognises the studio disc as the more significant half of the record and also as "perhaps one of the most adventurous recordings ever released by a major label group".

The band have since been dismissive and critical of the work. Recalling the album in later years, Waters said: "Ummagumma – what a disaster!" In 1995, Gilmour described the album as "horrible", though he thought the live album might be acceptable musically. In a 1984 interview, Mason said: "I thought it was a very good and interesting little exercise, the whole business of everyone doing a bit. But I still feel really that that's quite a good example of the sum being greater than the parts ..." Later, he described it as "a failed experiment", adding that "the most significant thing is that we didn't do it again".

=== Dragonfly species ===
In December 2015 scientists named a newfound insect of the genus Umma – a damselfly – Umma gumma after the album.

== Track listing ==
Live album

Side one
No.	Title	Writer(s)	Original album	Length
1.	"Astronomy Domine"	Syd Barrett	The Piper at the Gates of Dawn, 1967	8:25
2.	"Careful with That Axe, Eugene"	Roger Waters; Richard Wright; Nick Mason; David Gilmour	B-side of "Point Me at the Sky" single, 1968	8:47
Total length:				17:12

Side two
No.	Title	Writer(s)	Original album	Length
1.	"Set the Controls for the Heart of the Sun"	Waters	A Saucerful of Secrets, 1968	9:21
2.	"A Saucerful of Secrets" I. "Something Else" (3:22) II. "Syncopated Pandemonium" (2:52) III. "Storm Signal" (0:58) IV. "Celestial Voices" (5:39)	Waters; Wright; Mason; Gilmour	A Saucerful of Secrets, 1968	12:51
Total length:				22:12 39:24

Studio album

Side three
No.	Title	Writer(s)	Length
1.	"Sysyphus" "Part I" (1:10) "Part II" (3:31) "Part III" (1:50) "Part IV" (7:01)	Wright	13:32 (Note: These times reflect CD track divisions. However, track divisions on original vinyl releases have the CD's "Part I & II" combined into one part and the CD's "Part IV" split into two parts. The vinyl track divisions, rather than the CD ones, reflect the actual breaks in the music.)
2.	"Grantchester Meadows"	Waters	7:23
3.	"Several Species of Small Furry Animals Gathered Together in a Cave and Grooving with a Pict"	Waters	4:47
Total length:			25:42

Side four
No.	Title	Writer(s)	Length
1.	"The Narrow Way" "Part I" (3:26) "Part II" (2:52) "Part III" (5:56)	Gilmour	12:14
2.	"The Grand Vizier's Garden Party" "Part I: Entrance" (1:00) "Part II: Entertainment" (7:07) "Part III: Exit" (0:42)	Mason	8:55
Total length:			21:09 46:51 (86:32)

== Personnel ==
Pink Floyd

- David Gilmour – lead guitar, vocals (live album); voices on "Several Species of Small Furry Animals Gathered Together in a Cave and Grooving with a Pict"; acoustic and electric guitars, bass guitar, keyboards, drums and vocals on "The Narrow Way"
- Nick Mason – drums (live album); percussion, effects on "The Grand Vizier's Garden Party" parts 1 & 2
- Roger Waters – bass guitar, vocals (live album); acoustic guitars and vocals on "Grantchester Meadows", voices on "Several Species of Small Furry Animals Gathered Together in a Cave and Grooving with a Pict"
- Richard Wright – keyboards, vocals (live album); organ, piano, Mellotron and percussion on "Sysyphus"

Additional personnel

- Lindy Mason – flutes on "The Grand Vizier's Garden Party" Parts 1 & 3 (uncredited)
- Brian Humphries – engineering (live album)
- Pink Floyd – production (live album)
- Peter Mew – engineering (studio album)
- Norman Smith – production (studio album)
- Hipgnosis – sleeve design and photographs

== Charts ==
1969–1970 weekly chart performance for Ummagumma
Chart (1969–1970)	Peak position
Canada Top Albums/CDs (RPM)	78
Dutch Albums (Album Top 100)	5
German Albums (Offizielle Top 100)	25
UK Albums (Official Charts)	5
US Billboard 200	74

2011–2012 weekly chart performance for Ummagumma
Chart (2011–2012)	Peak position
Belgian Albums (Ultratop Wallonia)	89
French Albums (SNEP)	117
Spanish Albums (Promusicae)	88

== Certifications ==
Certifications for Ummagumma
Region	Certification	Certified units/sales
France (SNEP)	Gold	100,000^{*}
Italy (FIMI) sales since 2009	Gold	25,000^{*}
United Kingdom (BPI) sales since 2011	Gold	100,000^{‡}
United States (RIAA)	Platinum	1,000,000^{^}
^{*} Sales figures based on certification alone.^{^} Shipments figures based on certification alone.^{‡} Sales+streaming figures based on certification alone.
