= Azimuth Co-ordinator =

Sound system

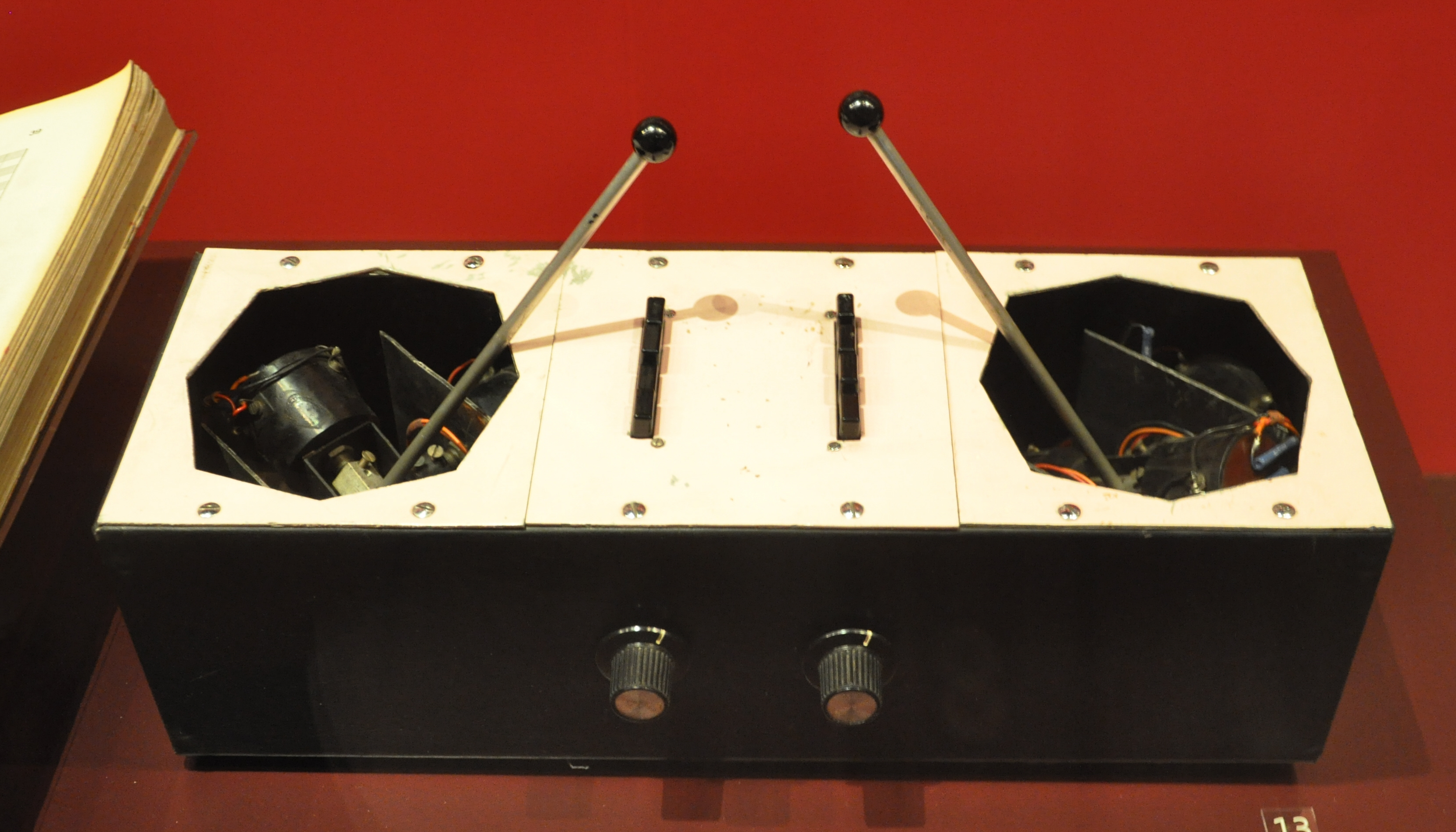
Azimuth Co-ordinator used by Pink Floyd, made by Bernard Speight, 1969 (Victoria & Albert Museum, London)

The Azimuth Co-ordinator was the first panning control for a quadraphonic sound system, at that time a new concept. Pink Floyd became the first band to use it in their early shows.

The Azimuth Co-ordinator uses four rotary rheostats housed in a large box. The rheostats were converted from their standard 270 degrees rotation to operate over the narrower 90 degree range imposed by the physical constraints of the control lever with the box top aperture. The system was operated using two joysticks, which allowed an audio signal to be panned between up to six loudspeakers placed around the hall.

During Pink Floyd's live shows, the Azimuth Co-ordinator was operated by keyboardist Rick Wright. As he operated the joystick, the source of the sound moved from speaker to speaker around the auditorium. With the controls in the central position, the sound output would be equal in all speakers.

It was constructed by technical engineer Bernard Speight at EMI Recording Studios. The original was stolen after the first concert at the Queen Elizabeth Hall in London, England. A second was built for the concert at the Royal Festival Hall in London on 14 April 1969. It had two pan pots and four channels.

Lost for many years, it was found under the aegis of London's Victoria and Albert Museum, and displayed as part of their Theatre Collections gallery from March 2009. It is also included as part of the V&A's 2017 Their Mortal Remains exhibition.
