= List of awards and nominations received by Pink Floyd =

Pink Floyd awards and nominations
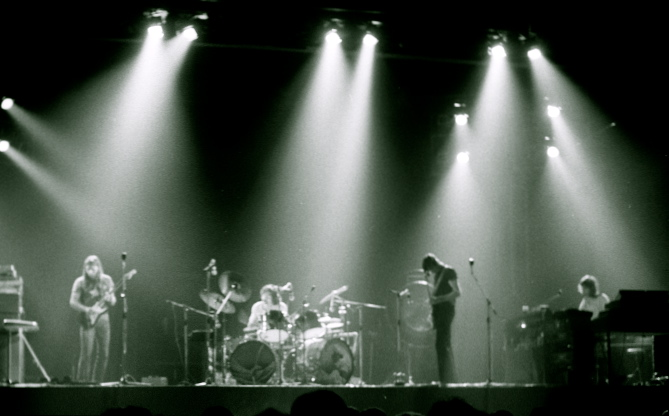
Awards and nominations
Award	Wins	Nominations

Totals (Note: Certain award groups do not simply award one winner. They acknowledge several different recipients, have runners-up, and have third place. Since this is a specific recognition and is different from losing an award, runner-up mentions are considered wins in this award tally. For simplification and to avoid errors, each award in this list has been presumed to have had a prior nomination.)
- Wins: 25
- Nominations: 31

This is a list of awards and nominations received by Pink Floyd. Overall, the English rock band Pink Floyd has received 25 awards and 31 nominations.

== Awards and nominations for Pink Floyd ==
Award	Year	Nominee(s)	Category	Result	Ref.
American Music Awards	1981	"Another Brick in the Wall"	Favorite Pop/Rock Song	Nominated	
American Music Awards	1995	Themselves	Favorite Pop/Rock Band/Duo/Group	Nominated	
BAFTA Film Awards	1983	"Another Brick in the Wall"	Best Original Song	Won	
BAFTA Film Awards	1983	Pink Floyd – The Wall	Best Sound	Won	
BMI Pop Awards	1993	"Another Brick in the Wall"	1 Million Award	Won	
Brit Awards	1977	Themselves	British Group	Nominated	
Brit Awards	1977	The Dark Side of the Moon	British Album of the Year	Nominated	
Brit Awards	1995	The Division Bell	British Album of the Year	Nominated	
Brit Awards	1995	Themselves	British Album of the Year	Nominated	
Demmy Awards	2005	"Breathe"	Best Multichannel Track	Nominated	
ECHO Awards	1995	Themselves	Best International Group	Won	
ECHO Awards	2007	Pulse	Best International Music DVD	Won	
ECHO Awards	2015	Themselves	Best International Group	Won	
ECHO Awards	2015	The Endless River	Best International Album	Nominated	
Grammy Awards	1981	The Wall	Album of the Year	Nominated	
Grammy Awards	1981	The Wall	Best Rock Performance by a Duo or Group with Vocal	Nominated	
Grammy Awards	1990	Delicate Sound of Thunder	Best Music Video - Long Form	Nominated	
Grammy Awards	1995	"Marooned"	Best Rock Instrumental Performance	Won	
Grammy Hall of Fame	1999	The Dark Side of the Moon	Hall of Fame	Won	
Grammy Hall of Fame	2008	The Wall	Hall of Fame	Won	
Hennemusic Rock News Awards	2014	Themselves	Artist of the Year	Nominated	
Hennemusic Rock News Awards	2018	Themselves	Story of the Year	Won	
Hennemusic Rock News Awards	2018	Themselves	Artist of the Year	Nominated	
Hennemusic Rock News Awards	2020	Themselves	Artist of the Year	Won	
Hennemusic Rock News Awards	2020	Themselves	Story of the Year	Won	
Ivor Novello Awards	1980	"Another Brick in the Wall"	The Best-Selling 'A' Side	Nominated	
Ivor Novello Awards	1981	"Another Brick in the Wall"	International Hit of the Year	Won	
Ivor Novello Awards	1992	Themselves	Outstanding Contribution to British Music	Won	
Juno Awards	1976	Wish You Were Here	International Album of the Year	Nominated	
Juno Awards	1981	The Wall	International Album of the Year	Won	
Juno Awards	1981	"Another Brick in the Wall"	International Single of the Year	Won	
MTV Video Music Awards	1988	"Learning to Fly"	Best Concept Video	Won	
MTV Video Music Awards	1988	"Learning to Fly"	Best Direction in a Video	Nominated	
MTV Video Music Awards	1988	"Learning to Fly"	Best Cinematography in a Video	Nominated	
Polar Music Prize	2008	Themselves	For international recognition of excellence in the world of music	Won	
Pollstar Concert Industry Awards	1988	A Momentary Lapse of Reason tour	Major Tour of the Year	Nominated	
Pollstar Concert Industry Awards	1988	A Momentary Lapse of Reason tour	Concert Industry Event Of The Year	Nominated	
Pollstar Concert Industry Awards	1988	A Momentary Lapse of Reason tour	Comeback Tour Of The Year	Won	
Pollstar Concert Industry Awards	1988	A Momentary Lapse of Reason tour	Most Creative Stage Set	Won	
Pollstar Concert Industry Awards	1989	A Momentary Lapse of Reason tour	Major Tour of the Year	Won	
Pollstar Concert Industry Awards	1989	A Momentary Lapse of Reason tour	Most Creative Stage Production	Won	
Pollstar Concert Industry Awards	1995	The Division Bell Tour	Most Creative Stage Production	Won	
Pollstar Concert Industry Awards	1995	The Division Bell Tour	Major Tour of the Year	Nominated	
Progressive Music Awards	2012	Why Pink Floyd...?	Grand Design	Won	
Progressive Music Awards	2012	Themselves	Lifetime Achievement Award	Nominated	
Progressive Music Awards	2012	Roger Waters	Prog God	Nominated	
Progressive Music Awards	2015	Themselves	Artist of the Year	Nominated	
Progressive Music Awards	2015	The Endless River	Album of the Year	Nominated	
Progressive Music Awards	2015	The Endless River	Grand Design	Nominated	
Progressive Music Awards	2017	Pink Floyd: Their Mortal Remains	Event of the Year	Nominated	
Progressive Music Awards	2017	The Early Years 1965–1972	Reissue of the Year	Nominated	
Progressive Music Awards	2017	Roger Waters	Artist of the Year	Nominated	
Progressive Music Awards	2019	Nick Mason	Prog God	Won	
World Music Awards	2014	Themselves	World's Best Group	Nominated	
World Music Awards	2014	Themselves	World's Best Live Act	Nominated	
Žebřík Music Awards	1994	The Division Bell Tour	Best International Concert	Won	
Žebřík Music Awards	2005	Themselves	Best International Surprise	Nominated	
Žebřík Music Awards	2006	Pulse	Best International Music DVD	Nominated	
