= The Division Bell Tour =

1994 concert tour by Pink Floyd

- Tour by Pink Floyd
- Promotional poster for the London concerts
- Location: Europe; North America
- Associated album: The Division Bell
- Start date: 30 March 1994
- End date: 29 October 1994
- Legs: 2
- No. of shows: 110

Pink Floyd concert chronology
- A Momentary Lapse of Reason Tour (1987–1989); The Division Bell Tour (1994)

The Division Bell Tour was the final concert tour by the English rock band Pink Floyd, held in 1994 to support their album The Division Bell. Pink Floyd went on indefinite hiatus after the tour eventually disbanding officially in 2008 with the death of Richard Wright. Recordings were released on the 1995 live album Pulse.

== History ==
Pink Floyd spent most of March 1994 rehearsing in a hangar at Norton Air Force Base in California and a soundstage at Universal Studios Florida. The Division Bell Tour was promoted by the Canadian musician Michael Cohl and became the highest-grossing tour in rock music history to that date. Pink Floyd played the entirety of their 1973 album The Dark Side of the Moon in some shows. They first played the whole of The Dark Side of the Moon on 15 July at the Pontiac Silverdome in Pontiac, Michigan, which was the first time since 1975 it was played.

The concerts featured even more special effects than the previous tour, including two custom designed airships. Three stages leapfrogged around North America and Europe, each 180 feet (55 m) long and featuring a 130-foot (40 m) arch resembling the Hollywood Bowl venue. All in all, the tour required 700 tons of steel carried by 53 articulated trucks, a crew of 161 people and an initial investment of US$4 million plus US$25 million of running costs just to stage. This tour played to over 5 million people in 68 cities; each concert gathered an average audience of 45,000.

The shows are documented by the Pulse album, video and DVD. The final concert of the tour on 29 October 1994 turned out to be the final full-length Pink Floyd performance, and the last time Pink Floyd played live before their one-off 18-minute reunion with Roger Waters at Live 8 on 2 July 2005, their first live appearance as a quartet in 24 years since The Wall Tour (1980–1981), as well as their last before Richard Wright's death in 2008.

== Sponsorship ==
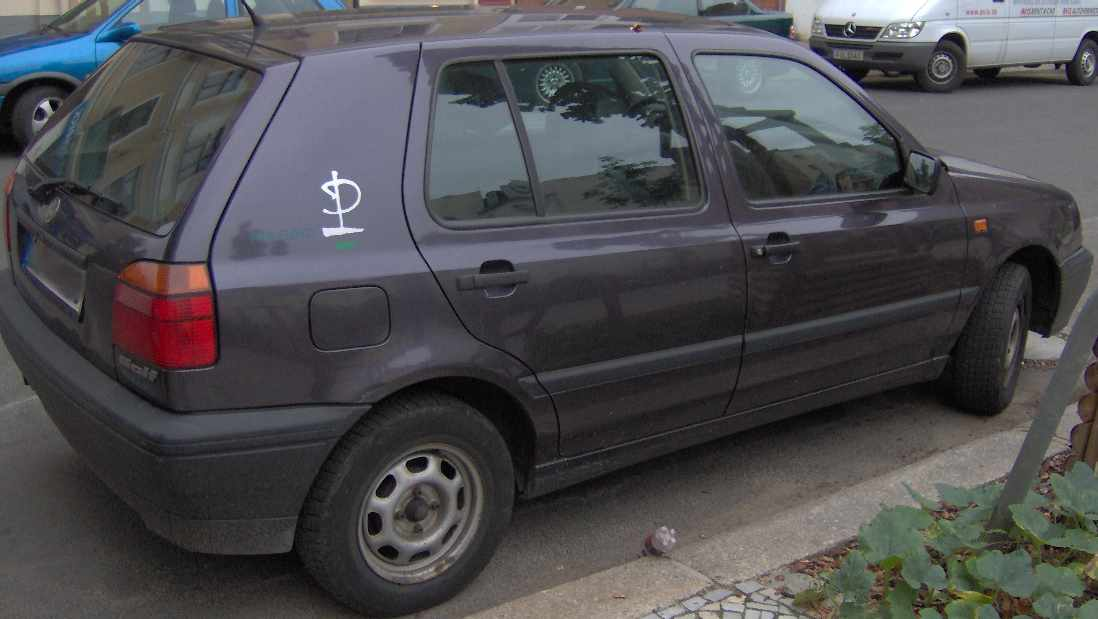
A Volkswagen Golf Pink Floyd Edition

The tour was sponsored in Europe by Volkswagen, which also issued a commemorative version of its top-selling car, the Golf Pink Floyd, one of which was given as a prize at each concert. It was a standard Golf with Pink Floyd decals and a premium stereo, and had Volkswagen's most environmentally friendly engine, at Gilmour's insistence. In 1995, Gilmour said he had donated the money he had made from the sponsorship to charity, and was uncomfortable with it: "I don't want [Volkswagen] to be able to say they have a connection with Pink Floyd, that they're part of our success. We will not do it again."

== Sales ==
At the end of the year, the Division Bell Tour was announced as the biggest tour ever, with worldwide gross of over £150 million (about US$250 million). In the U.S. alone, it grossed US$103.5 million from 59 concerts. Less than a year later, the Rolling Stones' Voodoo Lounge Tour finished with a worldwide gross of over US$300 million. The Rolling Stones, AC/DC, Metallica, U2, the Police, Bon Jovi, Madonna and the former Pink Floyd member Roger Waters are the only acts to achieve a higher worldwide gross from a tour, even when adjusting for inflation. The stage set was designed by Stufish Entertainment Architecture, led by the architect Mark Fisher.

== Personnel ==
Pink Floyd:

- David Gilmour – guitars, lead vocals, console steel guitar
- Nick Mason – drums, percussion
- Richard Wright – keyboards, co-lead vocals on 'Astronomy Domine," "Time" and "Comfortably Numb", backing vocals

Additional musicians:

- Guy Pratt – bass, co-lead vocals on "Comfortably Numb" and "Run Like Hell", backing vocals
- Jon Carin – keyboards, co-lead vocals on "Comfortably Numb" and "Hey You", backing vocals
- Gary Wallis – percussion, additional drums
- Tim Renwick – guitars, backing vocals
- Dick Parry – saxophones
- Sam Brown – backing vocals, co-lead vocals on "The Great Gig in the Sky"
- Claudia Fontaine – backing vocals, co-lead vocals on "The Great Gig in the Sky"
- Durga McBroom – backing vocals, co-lead vocals on "The Great Gig in the Sky"
- Douglas Adams – guitars, special guest for 28 October 1994 concert

== Tour dates ==
List of 1994 concerts
| Date | City | Country | Venue | Attendance | Revenue |
|---|---|---|---|---|---|
| 30 March | Miami Gardens | United States | Joe Robbie Stadium | 54,738 / 54,738 | $1,975,665 |
| 3 April | San Antonio | United States | Alamodome | 44,331 / 44,331 | $1,499,188 |
| 5 April | Houston | United States | Rice Stadium | 45,021 / 47,000 | $1,502,047 |
| 9 April | Mexico City | Mexico | Autódromo Hermanos Rodríguez | 90,476 / 90,476 | $5,235,862 |
| 10 April | Mexico City | Mexico | Autódromo Hermanos Rodríguez | 90,476 / 90,476 | $5,235,862 |
| 14 April | San Diego | United States | Jack Murphy Stadium | 51,610 / 51,610 | $1,594,069 |
| 16 April | Pasadena | United States | Rose Bowl | 129,060 / 129,060 | $4,703,290 |
| 17 April | Pasadena | United States | Rose Bowl | 129,060 / 129,060 | $4,703,290 |
| 20 April | Oakland | United States | Oakland–Alameda County Coliseum | 155,662 / 155,662 | $5,249,778 |
| 21 April | Oakland | United States | Oakland–Alameda County Coliseum | 155,662 / 155,662 | $5,249,778 |
| 22 April | Oakland | United States | Oakland–Alameda County Coliseum | 155,662 / 155,662 | $5,249,778 |
| 24 April | Tempe | United States | Sun Devil Stadium | 63,827 / 63,827 | $2,259,833 |
| 26 April | El Paso | United States | Sun Bowl Stadium | 34,945 / 37,000 | $1,148,228 |
| 28 April | Irving | United States | Texas Stadium | 87,400 / 87,400 | $2,944,618 |
| 29 April | Irving | United States | Texas Stadium | 87,400 / 87,400 | $2,944,618 |
| 1 May | Birmingham | United States | Legion Field | 55,169 / 55,169 | $2,944,618 |
| 3 May | Atlanta | United States | Bobby Dodd Stadium | 71,272 / 80,000 | $2,426,720 |
| 4 May | Atlanta | United States | Bobby Dodd Stadium | 71,272 / 80,000 | $2,426,720 |
| 6 May | Tampa | United States | Tampa Stadium | 55,987 / 55,987 | $2,038,815 |
| 8 May | Nashville | United States | Vanderbilt Stadium | 41,169 / 41,169 | $1,348,505 |
| 10 May | Raleigh | United States | Carter–Finley Stadium | 46,656 / 48,000 | $1,597,283 |
| 12 May | Clemson | United States | Memorial Stadium | 50,569 / 50,569 | $1,733,619 |
| 14 May | New Orleans | United States | Louisiana Superdome | 41,475 / 41,475 | $1,401,445 |
| 18 May | Foxborough | United States | Foxboro Stadium | 137,175 / 137,175 | $4,975,365 |
| 19 May | Foxborough | United States | Foxboro Stadium | 137,175 / 137,175 | $4,975,365 |
| 20 May | Foxborough | United States | Foxboro Stadium | 137,175 / 137,175 | $4,975,365 |
| 22 May | Montreal | Canada | Olympic Stadium | 187,302 / 187,302 | $5,301,117 |
| 23 May | Montreal | Canada | Olympic Stadium | 187,302 / 187,302 | $5,301,117 |
| 24 May | Montreal | Canada | Olympic Stadium | 187,302 / 187,302 | $5,301,117 |
| 26 May 1994 | Cleveland | United States | Cleveland Stadium | 108,205 / 110,000 | $3,807,153 |
| 27 May | Cleveland | United States | Cleveland Stadium | 108,205 / 110,000 | $3,807,153 |
| 29 May | Columbus | United States | Ohio Stadium | 75,250 / 75,250 | $2,406,920 |
| 31 May | Pittsburgh | United States | Three Rivers Stadium | 55,054 / 55,054 | $1,879,330 |
| 2 June | Philadelphia | United States | Veterans Stadium | 152,264 / 152,264 | $5,091,120 |
| 3 June | Philadelphia | United States | Veterans Stadium | 152,264 / 152,264 | $5,091,120 |
| 4 June | Philadelphia | United States | Veterans Stadium | 152,264 / 152,264 | $5,091,120 |
| 6 June | Syracuse | United States | Carrier Dome | 38,901 / 38,901 | $1,338,073 |
| 10 June | New York City | United States | Yankee Stadium | 103,690 / 103,690 | $3,765,090 |
| 11 June | New York City | United States | Yankee Stadium | 103,690 / 103,690 | $3,765,090 |
| 14 June | Indianapolis | United States | Hoosier Dome | 44,762 / 44,762 | $1,487,448 |
| 16 June | Ames | United States | Cyclone Stadium | 46,273 / 46,273 | $1,514,838 |
| 18 June | Denver | United States | Mile High Stadium | 69,788 / 69,788 | $2,375,714 |
| 20 June | Kansas City | United States | Arrowhead Stadium | 57,003 / 57,003 | $1,914,318 |
| 22 June | Minneapolis | United States | Hubert H. Humphrey Metrodome | N/A | N/A |
| 25 June | Vancouver | Canada | BC Place | N/A | N/A |
| 26 June | Vancouver | Canada | BC Place | N/A | N/A |
| 28 June | Edmonton | Canada | Commonwealth Stadium | 57,701 / 57,701 | $1,834,004 |
| 1 July | Winnipeg | Canada | Winnipeg Stadium | 42,616 / 42,616 | $1,234,117 |
| 3 July | Madison | United States | Camp Randall Stadium | 60,960 / 60,960 | $1,942,780 |
| 5 July | Toronto | Canada | Exhibition Stadium | 158,593 / 158,593 | $4,431,108 |
| 6 July | Toronto | Canada | Exhibition Stadium | 158,593 / 158,593 | $4,431,108 |
| 7 July | Toronto | Canada | Exhibition Stadium | 158,593 / 158,593 | $4,431,108 |
| 9 July | Washington, D.C. | United States | Robert F. Kennedy Memorial Stadium | 98,570 / 98,570 | $3,313,378 |
| 10 July | Washington, D.C. | United States | Robert F. Kennedy Memorial Stadium | 98,570 / 98,570 | $3,313,378 |
| 12 July | Chicago | United States | Soldier Field | 51,981 / 51,981 | $2,056,105 |
| 14 July | Pontiac | United States | Pontiac Silverdome | 111,355 / 111,355 | $3,772,950 |
| 15 July | Pontiac | United States | Pontiac Silverdome | 111,355 / 111,355 | $3,772,950 |
| 17 July | East Rutherford | United States | Giants Stadium | 118,554 / 118,554 | $4,474,220 |
| 18 July | East Rutherford | United States | Giants Stadium | 118,554 / 118,554 | $4,474,220 |
| 22 July | Lisbon | Portugal | Estádio José Alvalade | | |
| 23 July | Lisbon | Portugal | Estádio José Alvalade | | |
| 25 July | San Sebastián | Spain | Anoeta | | |
| 27 July | Barcelona | Spain | Estadi Olímpic Lluís Companys | | |
| 30 July | Chantilly | France | Hippodrome de Chantilly | | |
| 31 July | Chantilly | France | Hippodrome de Chantilly | | |
| 2 August | Cologne | Germany | Müngersdorfer Stadion | | |
| 4 August | Munich | Germany | Olympiastadion | | |
| 6 August | Basel | Switzerland | St. Jakob Stadium | | |
| 7 August | Basel | Switzerland | St. Jakob Stadium | | |
| 9 August | Montpellier | France | Parc du Château de Grammont | | |
| 11 August | Bordeaux | France | Esplanade des Quinconces | | |
| 13 August | Hockenheim | Germany | Hockenheimring | | |
| 16 August | Hanover | Germany | Niedersachsenstadion | | |
| 17 August | Hanover | Germany | Niedersachsenstadion | | |
| 19 August | Vienna | Austria | Flughafen, Wiener Neustadt | | |
| 21 August | Berlin | Germany | Maifeld am Glockenturm | | |
| 23 August | Gelsenkirchen | Germany | Parkstadion | | |
| 25 August | Copenhagen | Denmark | Parken Stadium | | |
| 27 August | Gothenburg | Sweden | Ullevi | | |
| 29 August | Oslo | Norway | Valle Hovin | | |
| 30 August | Oslo | Norway | Valle Hovin | | |
| 2 September | Werchter | Belgium | Werchter festival ground | | |
| 3 September | Rotterdam | Netherlands | Stadion Feijenoord | | |
| 4 September | Rotterdam | Netherlands | Stadion Feijenoord | | |
| 5 September | Rotterdam | Netherlands | Stadion Feijenoord | | |
| 7 September | Prague | Czech Republic | Strahov Stadium | | |
| 9 September | Strasbourg | France | Stade de la Meinau | | |
| 11 September | Lyon | France | Stade de Gerland | | |
| 13 September | Turin | Italy | Stadio delle Alpi | | |
| 15 September | Udine | Italy | Stadio Friuli | | |
| 17 September | Modena | Italy | Festa de l'Unità | | |
| 19 September | Rome | Italy | Cinecittà | | |
| 20 September | Rome | Italy | Cinecittà | | |
| 21 September | Rome | Italy | Cinecittà | | |
| 23 September | Lyon | France | Stade de Gerland | | |
| 25 September | Lausanne | Switzerland | Stade Olympique de la Pontaise | | |
| 13 October | London | England | Earls Court Exhibition Centre | 273,474 / 273,474 | $9,188,726 |
| 14 October | London | England | Earls Court Exhibition Centre | 273,474 / 273,474 | $9,188,726 |
| 15 October | London | England | Earls Court Exhibition Centre | 273,474 / 273,474 | $9,188,726 |
| 16 October | London | England | Earls Court Exhibition Centre | 273,474 / 273,474 | $9,188,726 |
| 17 October (Note: The concert in London on 17 October 1994 originally took place on 12 October, but it was cancelled and rescheduled after a seating stand collapse during the concert.) | London | England | Earls Court Exhibition Centre | 273,474 / 273,474 | $9,188,726 |
| 19 October | London | England | Earls Court Exhibition Centre | 273,474 / 273,474 | $9,188,726 |
| 20 October | London | England | Earls Court Exhibition Centre | 273,474 / 273,474 | $9,188,726 |
| 21 October | London | England | Earls Court Exhibition Centre | 273,474 / 273,474 | $9,188,726 |
| 22 October | London | England | Earls Court Exhibition Centre | 273,474 / 273,474 | $9,188,726 |
| 23 October | London | England | Earls Court Exhibition Centre | 273,474 / 273,474 | $9,188,726 |
| 26 October | London | England | Earls Court Exhibition Centre | 273,474 / 273,474 | $9,188,726 |
| 27 October | London | England | Earls Court Exhibition Centre | 273,474 / 273,474 | $9,188,726 |
| 28 October | London | England | Earls Court Exhibition Centre | 273,474 / 273,474 | $9,188,726 |
| 29 October | London | England | Earls Court Exhibition Centre | 273,474 / 273,474 | $9,188,726 |

=== Cancelled shows ===
List of cancelled shows
| Date | City | Country | Venue | Reason |
|---|---|---|---|---|
| 1 September 1994 | Helsinki | Finland | Olympiastadion | Poor sales |

== See also ==
- List of highest-grossing concert tours
- List of most-attended concert tours
