= Rattle That Lock =

Studio album by David Gilmour
- Released: 18 September 2015
- Recorded: 2010–2015
- Studio: Medina Studio (Hove); Astoria Studio (Hampton); Abbey Road Studios (London); AIR Studios (London)
- Genre: Rock; jazz; ambient
- Length: 51:28
- Label: Columbia
- Producer: David Gilmour; Phil Manzanera

David Gilmour chronology
Metallic Spheres (2010)	Rattle That Lock (2015)	Live at Pompeii (2017)

Singles from Rattle That Lock
- 1. "Rattle That Lock" Released: 17 July 2015; 2. "Today" Released: 4 September 2015; 3. "Faces of Stone" Released: 6 November 2015; 4. "In Any Tongue" Released: 4 March 2016

Professional ratings
Aggregate scores
Source	Rating
AnyDecentMusic?	6.5/10
Metacritic	75/100
Review scores
Source	Rating
AllMusic	3.5/5 stars
Drowned in Sound	7/10
The Guardian	3/5 stars
Louder Sound	3.5/5 stars
Mojo	4/5 stars
The Music	3/5 stars
Q	4/5 stars
Record Collector	4/5 stars
Renowned for Sound	4/5 stars
Rolling Stone	3.5/5 stars

Rattle That Lock is the fourth solo studio album by the English musician David Gilmour. It was released on 18 September 2015 via Columbia Records. The artwork for the album was created by Dave Stansbie from The Creative Corporation under the direction of Aubrey Powell, who has worked with Gilmour and Pink Floyd since the late 1960s.

The album received generally positive reviews from critics and was a commercial success, becoming Gilmour's second number one solo album in the United Kingdom. Gilmour supported the album with the Rattle That Lock Tour throughout 2015 and 2016, with a performance from the tour at the Amphitheatre of Pompeii being made into the live album and video, Live at Pompeii (2017).

== Recording ==
The album was recorded at Gilmour's recording studios. Phil Manzanera, co-producer of the album, estimated that Gilmour had been writing the material for Rattle That Lock over the previous five years, though he pointed out that one piano piece was recorded 18 years ago in Gilmour's living room. Most of the album was recorded at Medina Studio, in Hove – the additional recording was at the Astoria houseboat studio, in both cases by long time collaborator, engineer Andy Jackson and Damon Iddins. The final Pink Floyd album, The Endless River, was similarly recorded and produced using a combination of the two studios. Orchestra parts were recorded at AIR Studios in London and the Liberty Choir were recorded in a South London church. The album was mixed at Astoria and mastering for all formats was performed by James Guthrie and Joel Plante at das boot recording in Lake Tahoe, California.

The title track "Rattle That Lock" was inspired by and makes use of the SNCF jingle, composed by Michaël Boumendil. Gilmour heard and recorded the jingle on his iPhone at Aix-en-Provence station while travelling to visit friends. When Boumendil first got a phone message from Gilmour, he thought it might be a prank, so didn't return the call. The lyrics for the track were written by Gilmour's wife and long time collaborator Polly Samson and are based around the themes of Book II of John Milton's Paradise Lost. The musicians Mica Paris and Louise Marshall, together with the Liberty Choir, perform on the track.

David's son Gabriel performs piano on the song "In Any Tongue," his recording debut.

== Promotion ==
=== Radio ===
"Rattle That Lock" was the first single released from the album, it had its first radio airplay on BBC Radio 2's The Chris Evans Breakfast Show during the morning of 17 July 2015. The single was made available for digital download immediately afterwards. Also, David granted U.S. radio DJ Redbeard an interview and premiered the album in the United States on an episode of In the Studio the week of the album's U.S. release.

For the week beginning on 3 August 2015, BBC Radio 2 made "Rattle That Lock" their Record of the Week, guaranteeing the song at least one play per day.

=== Music video ===
On 31 July 2015, a music video for "Rattle That Lock" was released on Gilmour's website and promoted via social media outlets. The video was created by Trunk Animation under direction from Alasdair Brotherston and Jock Mooney, produced by Richard Barnett and involved 12 animators, artists and compositors. Aubrey Powell of Hipgnosis served as Creative Director for the video. The video depicts the fall of Lucifer from the Kingdom of Heaven and his subsequent journey through Pandæmonium, Purgatory and Chaos to corrupt the virgin Earth and become Satan, as told in the epic poem Paradise Lost.

== Artwork ==
The album's cover features a landscape photograph by Rupert Truman of StormStudios with painted corvidae escaping a locked cage. The album book's photographs were taken by Kevin Westenberg, with Polly Samson contributing recording session photographs. Aubrey Powell of Hipgnosis is credited as creative director.

== Tour ==
The Rattle That Lock tour was scheduled to begin on 12 September 2015 in Pula, Croatia with a special album preview show on 5 September 2015 in Brighton, England. It ended on 12 April 2016 in New York City, US with a three-month break between the South American and American legs. Gilmour also performed a one-off charity show at Wrocław, Poland on 25 June 2016.

On 17 September 2016, Gilmour performed a concert in France at the Roman Theatre of Orange (Théâtre antique d'Orange). For the occasion, due to the relationship between the song "Rattle that Lock" and the SNCF jingle, SNCF joined with Sony Music for the special event. On the eve of the concert, a few selected people took a private TGV (High Speed Train) from Paris to Orange and were afforded VIP status during the concert.

Most of the venues on the European leg of the tour were Roman amphitheatres, similar to the one featured in Pink Floyd: Live at Pompeii (1971). Gilmour also played two historic venues in London: the Royal Albert Hall and KOKO (formerly the Camden Palace theatre). He also played the historic Auditorium Theatre in Chicago, having last performed there with Pink Floyd in 1972. In July 2016, David and his band played two concerts in Pompeii and, in 2017, selected cinemas around the world showed the film Live at Pompeii which was later released on multiple formats.

The touring band was made up of mostly the same musicians who accompanied Gilmour on his On an Island Tour of 2006 and include Phil Manzanera, Guy Pratt, Jon Carin and Steve DiStanislao. Kevin McAlea, who performed with Carin at Kate Bush's Before the Dawn shows in 2014, also played keyboards on the tour in place of Richard Wright.

== Track listing ==
All music by David Gilmour, except "Rattle That Lock", written by Gilmour and Michaël Boumendil. All lyrics by Polly Samson, except where noted.

Side one
No.	Title	Lyrics	Length
1.	"5 A.M."	Instrumental	3:04
2.	"Rattle That Lock"		4:55
3.	"Faces of Stone"	Gilmour	5:32
4.	"A Boat Lies Waiting"		4:34
5.	"Dancing Right in Front of Me"	Gilmour	6:11

Side two
No.	Title	Lyrics	Length
6.	"In Any Tongue"		6:46
7.	"Beauty"	Instrumental	4:28
8.	"The Girl in the Yellow Dress"		5:25
9.	"Today"		5:55
10.	"And Then..."	Instrumental	4:29
Total length:			51:28

== Personnel ==
Credits are adapted from the album's liner notes.

- David Gilmour – lead vocals (All except 1, 7, 10); guitars (all); keyboards (all except 8); piano (1, 3–5); SNCF sample (2); Hammond organ (2, 5, 9); bass guitar (5–7, 10); bass harmonica (7); electric piano (9, 10)
- Jon Carin – electric piano (9)
- David Crosby – backing vocals (4)
- Graham Nash – backing vocals (4)
- Danny Cummings – percussion (3–5, 7, 10)
- Steve DiStanislao – drums (2, 3, 5, 7, 9); percussion (2, 3, 7); backing vocals (2)
- Roger Eno – piano (4, 7)
- Martin France – drums (8)
- Gabriel Gilmour – piano (6)
- Jools Holland – piano (8)
- Damon Iddins – accordion (3); calliope keyboard (3)
- Rado Klose – guitar (8)
- Chris Laurence – double bass (8)
- The Liberty Choir – backing vocals (2)
- Phil Manzanera – Hammond organ (2, 3); keyboard elements (2, 3, 6); acoustic guitar (3, 9)
- Louise Marshall – backing vocals (2, 9)
- Andy Newmark – drums (5, 6, 10)
- Eira Owen – French horn (3)
- John Parricelli – guitar (8)
- Mica Paris – backing vocals (2, 9)
- Guy Pratt – bass guitar (2, 9)
- Mike Rowe – electric piano (9)
- Polly Samson – backing vocals (9)
- Yaron Stavi – bass guitar (2); double bass (2, 4, 5); backing vocals (2)
- Colin Stetson – saxophone (8)
- Richard Wright – voice sample (4)
- Robert Wyatt – cornet (8)
- Zbigniew Preisner – orchestration (1, 3, 5, 6, 9, 10)
- Michaël Boumendil – original SNCF jingle (2)

Barn Jam personnel

- David Gilmour – guitars
- Richard Wright – keyboards
- Guy Pratt – bass guitar
- Steve DiStanislao – drums

== Chart performance ==
=== Weekly charts ===
Chart (2015)	Peak position
Australian Albums (ARIA)	2
Austrian Albums (Ö3 Austria)	2
Belgian Albums (Ultratop Flanders)	1
Belgian Albums (Ultratop Wallonia)	1
Brazilian Albums (ABPD)	9
Canadian Albums (Billboard)	2
Croatian International Albums (HDU)ERROR in "Croatia": Missing parameters: id.	2
Czech Albums (ČNS IFPI)	1
Danish Albums (Hitlisten)	3
Dutch Albums (Album Top 100)	2
Finnish Albums (Suomen virallinen lista)	3
French Albums (SNEP)	1
German Albums (Offizielle Top 100)	2
Hungarian Albums (MAHASZ)	9
Irish Albums (IRMA)	2
Italian Albums (FIMI)	1
New Zealand Albums (RMNZ)	1
Norwegian Albums (VG-lista)	1
Polish Albums (ZPAV)	1
Portuguese Albums (AFP)	1
Scottish Albums (OCC)	1
South Korean International Albums (Circle)	3
Spanish Albums (Promusicae)	6
Swedish Albums (Sverigetopplistan)	1
Swiss Albums (Schweizer Hitparade)	2
UK Albums (OCC)	1
UK Rock & Metal Albums (OCC)	1
US Billboard 200	5
US Top Rock Albums (Billboard)	1

=== Year-end charts ===
Chart (2015)	Position
Austrian Albums (Ö3 Austria)	72
Belgian Albums (Ultratop Flanders)	52
Belgian Albums (Ultratop Wallonia)	36
Canadian Albums (Billboard)	45
Dutch Albums (Album Top 100)	31
French Albums (SNEP)	58
German Albums (Offizielle Top 100)	50
Italian Albums (FIMI)	27
New Zealand Albums (RMNZ)	43
Swiss Albums (Schweizer Hitparade)	42
UK Albums (OCC)	35
US Top Rock Albums (Billboard)	35
Chart (2016)	Position
Belgian Albums (Ultratop Flanders)	156
Italian Albums (FIMI)	95

== Certifications ==
Region	Certification	Certified units/sales
Canada (Music Canada)	Gold	40,000^{^}
France (SNEP)	Gold	50,000^{*}
Germany (BVMI)	Gold	100,000^{‡}
Italy (FIMI)	Platinum	50,000^{*}
Poland (ZPAV)	Gold	10,000^{‡}
Switzerland (IFPI Switzerland)	Gold	10,000^{‡}
United Kingdom (BPI)	Gold	100,000^{*}
^{*} Sales figures based on certification alone.^{^} Shipments figures based on certification alone.^{‡} Sales+streaming figures based on certification alone.
