= Seamus (song) =

Song by Pink Floyd

from the album Meddle
- Released: 5 November 1971
- Recorded: 24–28 May 1971 (mixed on 26 July 1971)
- Studio: AIR, London (recording); Morgan, London (mixing)
- Genre: Country blues; novelty
- Length: 2:15
- Label: Harvest
- Songwriters: David Gilmour; Roger Waters; Richard Wright; Nick Mason
- Producer: Pink Floyd

"Seamus" is the fifth song on Pink Floyd's 1971 album Meddle. The group performs it in the style of country blues, with vocals, an acoustic slide guitar in an open D tuning, and piano. The song is named after the Border Collie Seamus (belonging to Humble Pie leader Steve Marriott) who howls throughout the 2:15 piece. Group biographer Nicholas Schaffner calls the tune "dispensable"; David Gilmour added "I guess it wasn't really as funny to everyone else [as] it was to us".

== "Mademoiselle Nobs" ==
The film director Adrian Maben captured Pink Floyd's only live performance of "Seamus" (in a greatly altered form, excluding lyrics, and retitled "Mademoiselle Nobs") in his film Pink Floyd: Live at Pompeii. To recreate the song, David Gilmour played harmonica instead of singing and Roger Waters played one of Gilmour's Stratocaster guitars. A female Borzoi (Russian Wolfhound) named Nobs, which belonged to Madonna Bouglione (the daughter of circus director Joseph Bouglione), was brought to the studio to provide howling accompaniment as Seamus did in the Meddle album version. There is also an audible bass guitar in this recording, likely overdubbed during mixing of the film soundtrack at another studio. For the 2016 surround sound mix of the film, released as part of the box set The Early Years 1965–1972 (2016), "Mademoiselle Nobs" was omitted for undisclosed reasons.

== Reception ==
In a review for the Meddle album, Jean-Charles Costa of Rolling Stone described "Seamus" as "a great pseudo-spoof blues tune with David Gilmour's dog [sic] Seamus taking over the lead 'howl' duties". In a more negative review, Classic Rock Review described "Seamus" a "throwaway" that's "meant to be a humorous filler with an annoying, howling dog throughout". Classic Rock Review further said that Pink Floyd fans have ranked "Seamus" as one of their worst songs.

== Personnel ==
- David Gilmour – acoustic guitar and vocals (Meddle), harmonica (Live at Pompeii)
- Roger Waters – bass guitar (Meddle, studio overdub on Live at Pompeii), electric guitar (Live at Pompeii)
- Richard Wright – piano (Meddle), dog microphone (Live at Pompeii)

with canine participant:

- Seamus (Meddle) – howling
- Nobs (Live at Pompeii) – howling
