= Live at Pompeii =

Live album by David Gilmour
- Released: 29 September 2017
- Recorded: 7–8 July 2016
- Venue: Amphitheatre of Pompeii
- Genre: Progressive rock, blues rock
- Length: 148 min (CD, LP, download); 155 min (DVD, BD); 426 min (deluxe boxset)
- Label: Columbia
- Director: Gavin Elder
- Producer: David Gilmour

David Gilmour chronology
Rattle That Lock (2015)	Live at Pompeii (2017)	Luck and Strange (2024)

David Gilmour video chronology
Live in Gdańsk (2008)	Live at Pompeii (2017)

Singles from Live at Pompeii
- 1. "Rattle That Lock" Released: 28 July 2017; 2. "One of These Days" Released: 8 September 2017; 3. "Run Like Hell" Released: 29 September 2017

Professional ratings
Review scores
Source	Rating
AllMusic	3.5/5 stars
Classic Rock	8/10
Den of Geek	4/5 stars
The Guardian	5/5 stars
laut.de	4/5 stars
Record Collector	4/5 stars

Live at Pompeii is a live album and concert film by David Gilmour, the guitarist of Pink Floyd. It was recorded in July 2016 at the Amphitheatre of Pompeii, where Pink Floyd: Live at Pompeii was staged 44 years prior. It documents his 2015–16 world tour to promote his album, Rattle That Lock (2015). The film was directed by Gavin Elder. The album was released on 29 September 2017 and is available on Compact Disc, vinyl, digital download, DVD, Blu-ray and a deluxe box set containing the CD album and Blu-ray, plus a bonus Blu-ray of extra features.

== Promotion ==
A digital single containing "Rattle That Lock" was released to promote the album on 28 July 2017. "One of These Days" was released as a single on 8 September 2017, and "Run Like Hell" was released as a single on 29 September 2017.

Gilmour's official YouTube channel released preview videos during the period leading up to release. The full video for "Rattle That Lock" was uploaded on 2 August 2017. An excerpt from "One of These Days" was also uploaded the same day. On August 9th an excerpt from "A Boat Lies Waiting" was uploaded. An excerpt from "Today" was uploaded on 23 August 2017. On 30 August 2017 an excerpt from "Time" was uploaded. As well as preview videos, an electronic press kit (EPK) was uploaded to the channel. On 8 September 2017 the full video of "One of These Days" was uploaded, followed by "Run Like Hell" on 29 September. Promo videos for "Dancing Right In Front of Me", "Wish You Were Here", "The Great Gig in the Sky", "The Girl in the Yellow Dress" (Note: From Wrocław performance (bonus material); the performance at Pompeii was edited out of the live movie and album.) and "Comfortably Numb" were all added during the days before the album's release.

=== Cinema ===
On 13 September 2017 there was a worldwide cinema screening of Live at Pompeii prior to its 29 September release. The cinema version omitted some of the songs which feature on the full release.

Cinema track listing

1. Intro film featuring rehearsals and interviews.
2. "5 A.M."
3. "Rattle That Lock"
4. "What Do You Want from Me"
5. "The Great Gig In the Sky"
6. "A Boat Lies Waiting"
7. "Wish You Were Here"
8. "In Any Tongue"
9. "High Hopes"
10. "One of These Days"
11. "Shine On You Crazy Diamond"
12. "Sorrow"
13. "Run Like Hell"
14. "Time / Breathe (Reprise)"
15. "Comfortably Numb"
16. "Beauty" (end credits) (studio recording)

The songs "Faces of Stone", "The Blue", "Money", "Fat Old Sun", "Coming Back to Life", "On an Island" and "Today" were omitted from the cinema version.

=== Television ===
On 22 December 2017 a 60-minute TV version of Live at Pompeii premiered on Arte, a Franco-German broadcaster. The tracklist included "Faces of Stone" and "Coming Back to Life", but was greatly edited, cutting out portions of "Sorrow" and "Comfortably Numb".

TV track listing

1. "5 A.M."
2. "Rattle That Lock"
3. "Faces of Stone"
4. "The Great Gig In the Sky"
5. "Wish You Were Here"
6. "In Any Tongue"
7. "Coming Back to Life"
8. "Sorrow"
9. "Comfortably Numb"

== Track listing ==
=== CD, LP and download ===
Side one / CD 1
No.	Title	Writer(s)	Length
1.	"5 A.M."	Gilmour	3:13
2.	"Rattle That Lock"	Gilmour, Polly Samson, Michaël Boumendil	5:23
3.	"Faces of Stone"	Gilmour	6:00
4.	"What Do You Want from Me"	Gilmour, Richard Wright, Samson	4:30
Total length:			19:06

Side two
No.	Title	Writer(s)	Length
5.	"The Blue"	Gilmour / Samson	6:33
6.	"The Great Gig in the Sky"	Wright	6:02
7.	"A Boat Lies Waiting"	Gilmour, Samson	4:55
Total length:			17:30

Side three
No.	Title	Writer(s)	Length
8.	"Wish You Were Here"	Gilmour, Roger Waters	5:18
9.	"Money"	Waters	8:13
10.	"In Any Tongue"	Gilmour, Samson	7:47
Total length:			21:18

Side four
No.	Title	Writer(s)	Length
11.	"High Hopes"	Gilmour, Samson	9:31
12.	"One of These Days"	Waters, Gilmour, Wright, Nick Mason	6:32
Total length:			16:03

Side five / CD 2
No.	Title	Writer(s)	Length
1.	"Shine On You Crazy Diamond"	Gilmour, Wright, Waters	12:32
2.	"Fat Old Sun"	Gilmour	6:05
Total length:			18:37

Side six
No.	Title	Writer(s)	Length
3.	"Coming Back to Life"	Gilmour	7:18
4.	"On an Island"	Gilmour, Samson	7:01
5.	"Today"	Gilmour, Samson	6:40
Total length:			20:59

Side seven
No.	Title	Writer(s)	Length
6.	"Sorrow"	Gilmour	10:50
7.	"Run Like Hell"	Gilmour, Waters	7:16
Total length:			18:06

Side eight
No.	Title	Writer(s)	Length
8.	"Time / Breathe (Reprise)"	Mason, Waters, Wright, Gilmour	6:45
9.	"Comfortably Numb"	Gilmour, Waters	9:59
Total length:			16:44

=== DVD and BD ===
- Concert footage
1. "5 A.M."
2. "Rattle That Lock"
3. "Faces of Stone"
4. "What Do You Want from Me"
5. "The Blue"
6. "The Great Gig In the Sky"
7. "A Boat Lies Waiting"
8. "Wish You Were Here"
9. "Money"
10. "In Any Tongue"
11. "High Hopes"
12. "One of These Days"
13. "Shine On You Crazy Diamond"
14. "Fat Old Sun"
15. "Coming Back to Life"
16. "On an Island"
17. "Today"
18. "Sorrow"
19. "Run Like Hell"
20. "Time" / "Breathe (Reprise)"
21. "Comfortably Numb"
22. "Beauty" (closing credits) (studio recording)
- Pompeii Then and Now documentary.

=== Deluxe box set ===
The boxset contains the 2-CD album and the video on BD. It also contains the following:

Bonus BD of live material and documentaries

- South America concert footage:
1. "Astronomy Domine" (Syd Barrett)
2. "Us and Them" (Wright / Waters)
3. "Today"
4. "Time" / "Breathe (Reprise)"
5. "Comfortably Numb"
- Wrocław, Poland, June 2016 with the NFM Wrocław Philharmonic Orchestra concert footage:
1. "5 A.M."
2. "Rattle That Lock"
3. "Dancing Right In Front of Me" (Gilmour)
4. "The Girl In the Yellow Dress" (with Leszek Możdżer) (Gilmour / Samson)
5. "In Any Tongue"
- Europe 2015 documentary
- South America 2015 documentary
- North America 2016 documentary
- Europe 2016 documentary
- BBC documentary: David Gilmour: Wider Horizons

Collectables

- 24-page hardback photo book
- 8-page Pompeii guide titled The Amphitheatre at Pompeii – An Interview with Mary Beard
- 4 postcards
- 2-sided poster (the obverse replicates the album artwork, the reverse is a replica of the posters used to promote the Pompeii shows)

== Personnel ==
Pompeii and Wrocław

- David Gilmour – electric guitars, acoustic guitars, classical guitar, console steel guitar, lead and backing vocals, cymbals on "One of These Days", whistling on "In Any Tongue"
- Chester Kamen – electric guitars, acoustic guitars, classical guitar, 12-string acoustic guitar, high-strung acoustic guitar on "Comfortably Numb", backing vocals, harmonica on "The Blue"
- Guy Pratt – bass guitars, double bass, backing vocals, co-lead vocals on "Run Like Hell"
- Greg Phillinganes – piano, keyboards, backing vocals, co-lead vocals on "Time"
- Chuck Leavell – organ, keyboards, accordion, backing vocals, co-lead vocals on "Comfortably Numb"
- Steve DiStanislao – drums, percussion, backing vocals, aeoliphone on "One of These Days"
- João Mello – saxophones, clarinet, additional keyboards on "The Blue", high-strung acoustic guitar on "In Any Tongue"
- Bryan Chambers – backing vocals, lead vocals on "In Any Tongue" and "The Great Gig in the Sky", tambourine
- Lucita Jules – backing vocals, lead vocals on "The Great Gig in the Sky"
- Louise Clare Marshall (Pompeii only) – backing vocals, cowbell, lead vocals on "The Great Gig in the Sky"
- David Gilmour – Mixing
- Andy Jackson - Mixing
- Damon Iddins - Mixing
- Creative Direction - Polly Samson
- FOH Sound Engineer - Colin Norfield
- Monitor Engineer - Gavin Tempany
- Recording Engineer - Damon Iddins
- Sound FX - Damon Iddins
- Lighting Operator - Mark Risk

with:

- Leszek Możdżer – piano on "The Girl in the Yellow Dress" (Wrocław, 25 June 2016)
- Wrocław Philharmonic Orchestra conducted by Zbigniew Preisner (Wrocław, 25 June 2016)

South America

- David Gilmour – electric guitars, lead and backing vocals
- Phil Manzanera – electric guitars, acoustic guitars, backing vocals, high-strung acoustic guitar on "Comfortably Numb"
- Jon Carin – piano, keyboards, electric guitars, backing vocals, co-lead vocals on "Time" and "Comfortably Numb"
- Kevin McAlea – keyboards
- Steve DiStanislao – drums, percussion, backing vocals
- João Mello – saxophones
- Bryan Chambers – backing vocals
- Lucita Jules – backing vocals
- David Gilmour – Mixing
- Andy Jackson - Mixing
- Damon Iddins - Mixing
- Creative Direction - Polly Samson
- FOH Sound Engineer - Colin Norfield
- Monitor Engineer - Gavin Tempany
- Recording Engineer - Damon Iddins
- Sound FX - Damon Iddins
- Lighting Operator - Mark Risk

== Charts ==
=== Weekly charts ===
Chart (2017–2018)	Peak position
Australian Albums (ARIA)	50
Austrian Albums (Ö3 Austria)	6
Belgian Albums (Ultratop Flanders)	4
Belgian Albums (Ultratop Wallonia)	6
Canadian Albums (Billboard)	19
Croatian International Albums (HDU)	29
Czech Albums (ČNS IFPI)	1
Danish Albums (Hitlisten)	21
Dutch Albums (Album Top 100)	2
Finnish Albums (Suomen virallinen lista)	9
French Albums (SNEP)	9
German Albums (Offizielle Top 100)	2
Hungarian Albums (MAHASZ)	6
Irish Albums (IRMA)	24
Italian Albums (FIMI)	1
New Zealand Albums (RMNZ)	31
Norwegian Albums (VG-lista)	4
Polish Albums (ZPAV)	7
Portuguese Albums (AFP)	2
Portuguese Music DVD (AFP)	1
Scottish Albums (OCC)	3
Spanish Albums (PROMUSICAE)	6
Swedish Albums (Sverigetopplistan)	12
Swiss Albums (Schweizer Hitparade)	4
UK Albums (OCC)	3
UK Rock & Metal Albums (OCC)	1
US Billboard 200	45
US Top Rock Albums (Billboard)	8

=== Year-end charts ===
Chart (2017)	Position
Belgian Albums (Ultratop Flanders)	89
Belgian Albums (Ultratop Wallonia)	56
Czech Albums (ČNS IFPI)	5
German Albums (Offizielle Top 100)	28
Italian Albums (FIMI)	59

Chart (2018)	Position
German Albums (Offizielle Top 100)	84

== Certifications ==
Region	Certification	Certified units/sales
Australia (ARIA) video	Gold	7,500^{^}
France (SNEP) video	2× Platinum	20,000^{*}
Germany (BVMI)	Gold	100,000^{‡}
Italy (FIMI)	Gold	25,000^{*}
^{*} Sales figures based on certification alone.^{^} Shipments figures based on certification alone.^{‡} Sales+streaming figures based on certification alone.

== See also ==
- Pink Floyd: Live at Pompeii
