= Faces of Stone =

Single by David Gilmour

from the album Rattle That Lock
- Released: 6 November 2015
- Genre: Progressive rock
- Length: 5:32 (album version); 3:53 (radio version)
- Label: Columbia
- Songwriter(s): David Gilmour
- Producer(s): David Gilmour; Phil Manzanera

David Gilmour singles chronology
"Today" (2015)	"Faces of Stone" (2015)	"In Any Tongue" (2016)

"Faces of Stone" is a single by English rock musician and former Pink Floyd member David Gilmour, and the third track on his fourth solo studio album, Rattle That Lock. It was released as a single on 6 November 2015, with the album being released on 18 September 2015 by Columbia Records. The song lyrics and music were composed by Gilmour.

== Music video ==
On 27 October 2015, a music video was released through Gilmour's official YouTube channel. It was directed by Aubrey Powell of Hipgnosis, combines footage of Gilmour filmed at his Medina studio with archive footage from the 1944 silent experimental short At Land featuring surrealist filmmaker Maya Deren.

== Personnel ==
Musicians

- David Gilmour – vocals, guitars, keyboards, piano, production, acoustical engineering, mixing
- Phil Manzanera – hammond organ, acoustic guitar, keyboard elements, production
- Damon Iddins – Accordion, calliope elements
- Steve DiStanislao – drums, percussion
- Danny Cummings – percussion
- Eira Owen – horn
- Zbigniew Preisner – orchestration and orchestral arrangements
- Robert Ziegler – conducting orchestra
- Rolf Wilson – orchestra leader

Production

- Andy Jackson – engineering, mixing, choir registration
- Damon Iddins – technical assistance, choir registration
- Mike Boddy – additional sound engineering at Gallery Studios
  - Andres Mesa – technical assistance
- Geoff Foster – engineering orchestral parts
  - Laurence Anslow, John Prestage – technical assistance
- James Guthrie – mastering
