= Rattle That Lock Tour =

2015–16 concert tour by David Gilmour

- Tour by David Gilmour
- Location: Europe; North America; South America
- Associated album: Rattle That Lock
- Start date: 12 September 2015
- End date: 30 September 2016
- Legs: 5
- No. of shows: 50
- Box office: $78.1 million

David Gilmour concert chronology
- On an Island Tour (2006); Rattle That Lock Tour (2015–2016); Luck and Strange (2024)

The Rattle That Lock Tour was a concert tour by the English singer and musician David Gilmour to support his fourth solo studio album, Rattle That Lock. The tour became a commercial success, grossing $47 million and selling 288,997 tickets in 16 shows in the 2015 total. It was the 76th highest grossing of the year, according to Pollstar's annual year end tour chart. The tour covered 50 performances – 17 more than his On an Island Tour in 2006. The tour is documented on the live release Live at Pompeii (2017).

== Background ==
The first eight tour dates (in Europe) were announced on 4 March 2015, with two more dates added later. The concerts are spread across six European countries at nine different venues. The dates were planned to coincide with the release of Gilmour's new album. The two new dates were announced on 6 March 2015 at the Royal Albert Hall, and were added due to high ticket demand for the three concerts already planned at the venue. On 19 June 2015, a date was announced for a show in Wrocław, Poland, on 25 June 2016. Four North American dates were also announced on 16 July 2015, along with more details on the new album, to be released 18 September. Four more North American dates were added on 21 July 2015, in the same venues as the first four. On 26 July 2015, a 'preview show' was added at the Brighton Centre before the start of the main tour. Gilmour announced his first South American tour of five dates on 4 September 2015. Individual new dates were announced periodically until 2 February 2016, when a further 11 dates were added in Europe to take place in summer 2016.

Most of the venues on the first European leg of the tour were at Roman amphitheatres. Gilmour also played the Royal Albert Hall as his only UK venue of the tour. He also played the historic Auditorium Theatre in Chicago, having last performed there with Pink Floyd in 1972.

The touring band was made up of mostly the same musicians who accompanied Gilmour on his On an Island Tour of 2006. These are Phil Manzanera, Guy Pratt, Jon Carin and Steve DiStanislao. Kevin McAlea, who performed with Carin at Kate Bush's Before the Dawn shows in 2014, also played keyboards on the tour.

On 24 April 2016 Gilmour and his band played the final night of the year's Teenage Cancer Trust shows. This was Gilmour's first performance since the death of Prince three days earlier; as a tribute Gilmour worked a small portion of Prince's "Purple Rain" into "Comfortably Numb", immediately before the closing guitar solo; the stage lights all turned purple during the snippet. This brought the third leg of the tour to a close before new band members were drafted in.

When the third leg of the tour ended Gilmour's online outlets announced that Manzanera, Carin and McAlea would all be leaving the tour. Manzanera left due to obligations to recording a new solo album; Carin, to tour with Roger Waters in Mexico & Desert Trip. Shortly before the fourth leg Gilmour announced the new musicians for the European tour, they are Chester Kamen on guitar, whom Gilmour performed with as part of Bryan Ferry's band for Live Aid in 1985, replacing Manzanera; Greg Phillinganes on keyboards and vocals, replacing Carin; and Chuck Leavell on organ, vocals and accordion, long time member of The Rolling Stones' touring band and ex-member of The Allman Brothers Band, replacing McAlea. The new band rehearsed songs not performed previously on the tour, "Dancing Right In Front of Me" and "One of These Days". "One of These Days" hadn't been performed since the last Pink Floyd tour in 1994. Both songs were debuted on the tour during Gilmour's show at Wrocław, Poland where they replaced "Fat Old Sun" and "Astronomy Domine", respectively.

On 25 June 2016 Gilmour performed at Wrocław, Poland in celebration of the city being European Capital of Culture 2016. The show saw the live debut of the song "Dancing Right In Front of Me" and the resurrection of "One of These Days", last performed in 1994. The show was broadcast live on Polish television. Gilmour and his band were accompanied by the Wrocław Philharmonic Orchestra conducted by Zbigniew Preisner, who contributed orchestrations to Gilmour's Rattle That Lock and On An Island albums. The orchestra performed on the tracks "5 A.M."; "Rattle That Lock"; "Faces of Stone"; "A Boat Lies Waiting"; "The Blue"; "In Any Tongue" (with cello solo); "High Hopes"; "Dancing Right In Front of Me"; "On an Island"; "The Girl in The Yellow Dress"; "Today" and "Comfortably Numb".

On 7 and 8 July 2016 Gilmour performed two shows at the Pompeii amphitheatre where he performed with Pink Floyd in 1971, and filmed Pink Floyd: Live at Pompeii. The performance on the 7 July was the first performance in the amphitheatre since Pink Floyd played there and the first public performance there since AD 79, when Vesuvius erupted, destroying Pompeii. Gilmour's wife, Polly Samson regularly tweeted about the event using the hashtag #ReturnToPompeii. Gilmour performed "One of These Days" on both nights – the only song from the set to have been performed by Pink Floyd there in 1971. Gilmour also dropped "Us and Them" from the set and replaced it with "The Great Gig in the Sky" but played earlier in the set (see the setlist details below). The shows were filmed for possible future release. On 31 May 2017, it was announced that Gilmour's new film—David Gilmour Live At Pompeii—should hit select cinemas for one night only on 13 September 2017.

On 16 July, Gilmour performed at Château de Chantilly, in France. He started the show by asking for a minute of silence to pay tribute to the victims of the terrorist attack that happened two days before in Nice. He did the same for the shows at the Arena of Nîmes on 20 and 21 July. On the 23 July he performed at Saline Royale, Arc-et-Senans, where construction began in 1775.

Unlike the On an Island Tour of 2006 where Gilmour performed the whole of his then-new album in its entirety, the Rattle That Lock tour saw no performances of "Beauty" or "And Then..." and only saw two performances of "Dancing Right In Front of Me".

== Tour dates ==
List of 2015 concerts, showing date, city, country and venue
Date	City	Country	Venue	Attendance	Revenue
12 September 2015	Pula	Croatia	Pula Arena	—	—
14 September 2015	Verona	Italy	Verona Arena	—	—
15 September 2015	Florence	Italy	Ippodromo del Visarno	—	—
17 September 2015	Orange	France	Théâtre antique d'Orange	—	—
19 September 2015	Oberhausen	Germany	König Pilsener Arena	—	—
23 September 2015	London	England	Royal Albert Hall	—	—
24 September 2015	London	England	Royal Albert Hall	—	—
25 September 2015	London	England	Royal Albert Hall	—	—
2 October 2015	London	England	Royal Albert Hall	—	—
3 October 2015	London	England	Royal Albert Hall	—	—
11 December 2015	São Paulo	Brazil	Allianz Parque	84,526 / 90,999	$8,090,240
12 December 2015	São Paulo	Brazil	Allianz Parque	84,526 / 90,999	$8,090,240
14 December 2015	Curitiba	Brazil	Pedreira Paulo Leminski	23,300 / 23,300	$2,422,680
16 December 2015	Porto Alegre	Brazil	Arena do Grêmio	37,674 / 46,754	$2,912,220
18 December 2015	Buenos Aires	Argentina	Hipodromo de San Isidro	65,136 / 65,136	$7,379,110
20 December 2015	Santiago	Chile	Estadio Nacional	46,509 / 46,509	$4,923,220

List of 2016 concerts, showing date, city, country and venue
Date	City	Country	Venue	Attendance	Revenue
24 March 2016	Los Angeles	United States	Hollywood Bowl	34,584 / 34,584	$3,510,766
25 March 2016	Los Angeles	United States	Hollywood Bowl	34,584 / 34,584	$3,510,766
27 March 2016	Inglewood	United States	The Forum	12,518 / 12,518	$1,634,215
31 March 2016	Toronto	Canada	Air Canada Centre	28,498 / 28,498	$2,627,651
1 April 2016	Toronto	Canada	Air Canada Centre	28,498 / 28,498	$2,627,651
4 April 2016	Chicago	United States	United Center	28,184 / 28,184 (Note: The score data is combined from the shows held at the United Center on April 4 and 8, respectively.)	$3,386,575
6 April 2016	Chicago	United States	Auditorium Theatre	3,817 / 3,817	$576,460
8 April 2016	Chicago	United States	United Center	—	—
10 April 2016	New York City	United States	Radio City Music Hall	5,903 / 5,903	$924,870
11 April 2016	New York City	United States	Madison Square Garden	28,160 / 28,160	$3,941,985
12 April 2016	New York City	United States	Madison Square Garden	28,160 / 28,160	$3,941,985
25 June 2016	Wrocław	Poland	Plac Wolności	—	—
27 June 2016	Vienna	Austria	Schönbrunn Palace	—	—
28 June 2016	Vienna	Austria	Schönbrunn Palace	—	—
2 July 2016	Rome	Italy	Circo Massimo	—	—
3 July 2016	Rome	Italy	Circo Massimo	—	—
7 July 2016	Pompeii	Italy	Amphitheatre of Pompeii	—	—
8 July 2016	Pompeii	Italy	Amphitheatre of Pompeii	—	—
10 July 2016	Verona	Italy	Verona Arena	—	—
11 July 2016	Verona	Italy	Verona Arena	—	—
14 July 2016	Stuttgart	Germany	Schlossplatz	—	—
16 July 2016	Chantilly	France	Château de Chantilly	—	—
18 July 2016	Wiesbaden	Germany	Bowling Green	—	—
20 July 2016	Nîmes	France	Arènes de Nîmes	—	—
21 July 2016	Nîmes	France	Arènes de Nîmes	—	—
23 July 2016	Arc-et-Senans	France	Saline Royal	—	—
27 July 2016	Tienen	Belgium	Grote Markt	—	—
28 July 2016	Tienen	Belgium	Grote Markt	—	—
23 September 2016	London	England	Royal Albert Hall	—	—
25 September 2016	London	England	Royal Albert Hall	—	—
28 September 2016	London	England	Royal Albert Hall	—	—
29 September 2016	London	England	Royal Albert Hall	—	—
30 September 2016	London	England	Royal Albert Hall	—	—
Total				398,309 / 414,362	$42,329,992

== Personnel ==
=== Legs 1–3 ===
Main band

- David Gilmour – electric guitars, acoustic guitars, classical guitar, console steel guitar, lead vocals, whistling on "In Any Tongue"
- Phil Manzanera – electric guitars, acoustic guitars, 12-string acoustic guitar, backing vocals
- Guy Pratt – bass guitars, double bass, backing vocals, lead vocals on "Run Like Hell"
- Jon Carin – piano, keyboards, electric guitars, lap steel guitars, backing vocals, lead vocals on "Time" and "Comfortably Numb"
- Kevin McAlea – piano, keyboards, accordion
- Steve DiStanislao – drums, percussion, backing vocals
- Theo Travis – saxophones, clarinet (5 September – 19 September)
- João Mello – saxophones, additional keyboards on "The Blue", high-strung acoustic guitar on "In Any Tongue" (23 September onwards)
- Bryan Chambers – backing vocals, additional percussion, lead vocals on "In Any Tongue"
- Louise Clare Marshall – backing vocals, additional percussion (except South America)
- Lucita Jules – backing vocals (South America and North America only)

Special guests

- David Crosby – harmony vocals on "A Boat Lies Waiting" and "On an Island"; lead and backing vocals on "Comfortably Numb" (23 September, Royal Albert Hall)
- Graham Nash – harmony vocals on "A Boat Lies Waiting" and "On an Island"; backing vocals on "Comfortably Numb" (23 September, Royal Albert Hall)
- Gabriel Gilmour – piano on "In Any Tongue" (25 September, Royal Albert Hall)

=== Legs 4–5 ===
Main band

- David Gilmour – electric guitars, acoustic guitars, classical guitar, console steel guitar, lead vocals, cymbals on "One of These Days", whistling on "In Any Tongue"
- Chester Kamen – electric guitars, acoustic guitars, 12-string acoustic guitar, backing vocals, harmonica on "The Blue"
- Guy Pratt – bass guitars, double bass, backing vocals, lead vocals on "Run Like Hell"
- Greg Phillinganes – keyboards, backing vocals, lead vocals on "Time"
- Chuck Leavell – keyboards, accordion, backing vocals, lead vocals on "Comfortably Numb" (Leg 4 only)
- Kevin McAlea – keyboards, accordion (Leg 5 only)
- Steve DiStanislao – drums, percussion, backing vocals, aeoliphone on "One of These Days"
- João Mello – saxophones, clarinet, additional keyboards on "The Blue", high-strung acoustic guitar on "In Any Tongue"
- Bryan Chambers – backing vocals, additional percussion, lead vocals on "The Great Gig in the Sky", "In Any Tongue" and "Comfortably Numb" (Leg 5)
- Lucita Jules – backing vocals, lead vocals on "The Great Gig in the Sky" and "Comfortably Numb" (Leg 5)
- Louise Clare Marshall – backing vocals, additional percussion, lead vocals on "The Great Gig in the Sky" and "Comfortably Numb" (Leg 5) (certain dates)

Special guests

- Leszek Możdżer – piano on "The Girl in the Yellow Dress" (Wrocław, 25 June 2016)
- Wrocław Philharmonic Orchestra conducted by Zbigniew Preisner (Wrocław, 25 June 2016)
- Benedict Cumberbatch – lead vocals on "Comfortably Numb" (London, 28 September 2016)
