= Aubrey Powell (designer) =

English album cover designer and film director

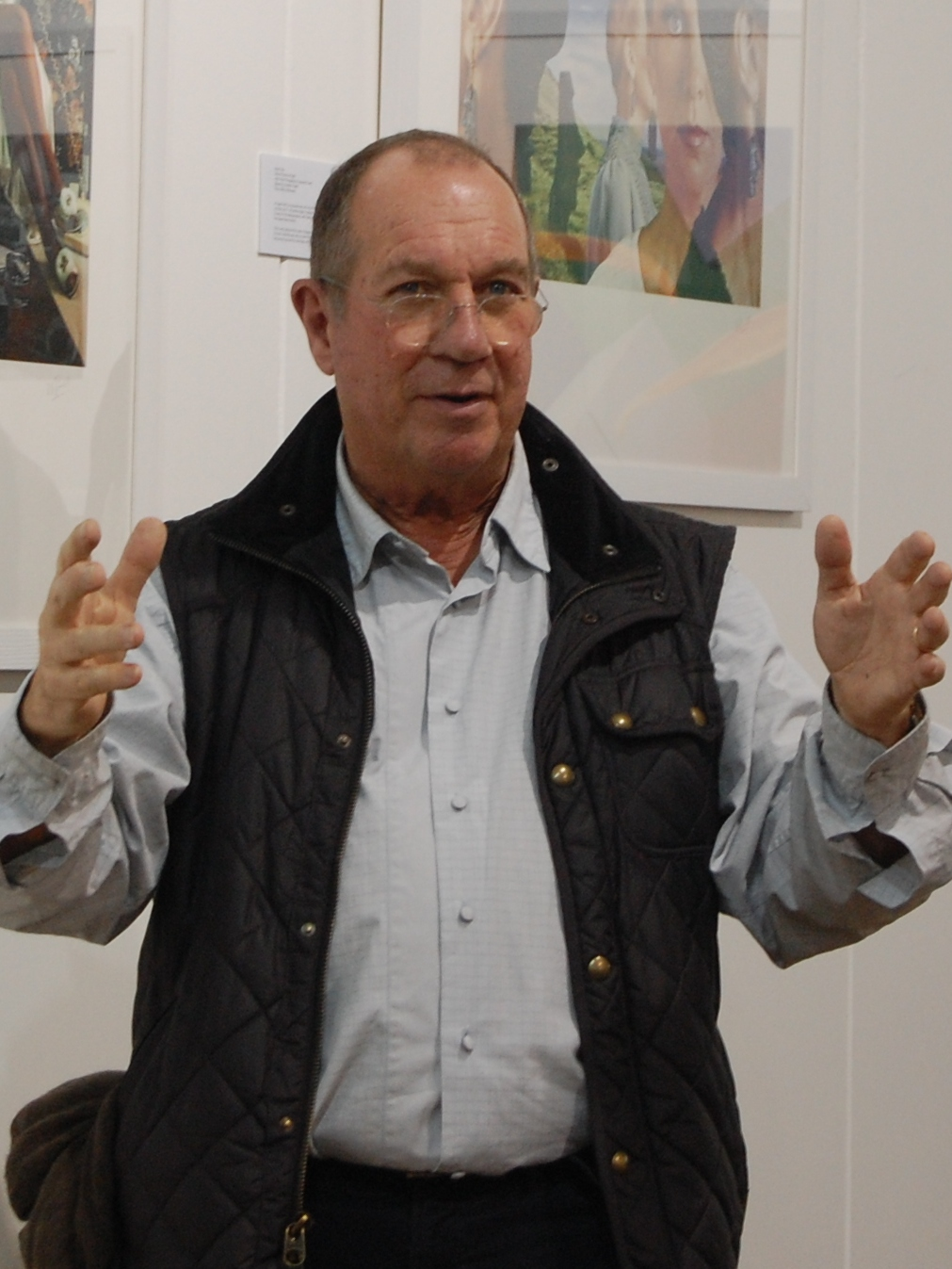
Powell giving a talk about his work at St Paul's Gallery in Birmingham, England, in February 2014

Powell's voice
recorded February 2014

Aubrey "Po" Powell (born 23 September 1946) is a British graphic designer. He co-founded the album cover design company Hipgnosis with Storm Thorgerson in 1967. The company ran for 15 years until 1982, and created some of the most acclaimed record cover art of the 1960s, 1970s and 1980s for many of the most famous rock bands of the era including Pink Floyd, Led Zeppelin, Paul McCartney, Yes, Genesis, 10cc, Wishbone Ash, Peter Gabriel, UFO, Bad Company, Emerson, Lake & Palmer, Scorpions, Styx, Syd Barrett, and Black Sabbath. The company was nominated five times for Grammy Awards.

== Early life ==
Powell was born in Sussex. His parents lived abroad for most of his formative years and he attended the King's School, Ely, Cambridgeshire. On leaving school he took several jobs including bus conductor, waiter, window dresser and clerk at the London Stock Exchange and he studied at the London School of Film Technique. He also met Storm Thorgerson and members of the nascent Pink Floyd in Cambridge and struck up lifelong friendships and working relationships.

== Career ==
In 1965, he secured a job in London as assistant scenic designer to Nick Pemberton, creating sets for the television series Z-Cars, Dr. Finlay's Casebook, and Emergency Ward 10. He shared an apartment with Storm Thorgerson where they conceived the idea of Hipgnosis, and in 1968 they produced their first album cover, for Pink Floyd's A Saucerful of Secrets. A studio was acquired at 6 Denmark Street in Soho and Hipgnosis thrived as one of the best-known photo design companies of the era. By the early 1980s, Hipgnosis had diversified into advertising, designing and producing campaigns for Peugeot, Kronenbourg 1664, Levi Jeans, Volvo, Gillette, Stella Artois, Rank Xerox and The Beatles.

Progressing from photo design to moving pictures, Powell, Thorgerson and Peter Christopherson started Greenback Films in 1982, shooting music videos for many of their existing and new clients including "Big Log" for Robert Plant, "Wherever I Lay My Hat" for Paul Young, "Owner of a Lonely Heart" for Yes and "Blue Light" for David Gilmour. The trio wrote, produced and directed three feature films: Incident at Channel Q starring Al Corley (Sony), Train of Thought with Yumi Matsutoya (Toshiba EMI) and Now Voyager starring Michael Hordern and Barry Gibb (Universal). Greenback Films closed in 1984.

Aubrey Powell formed Aubrey Powell Productions in 1985 with Peter Christopherson and producer Fiz Oliver, shooting music videos, long-form music-based films and television commercials. Credits include Coca-Cola (with Robert Plant), Miller Lite (with Randy Quaid and The Who), Budweiser, Nissan, Pan Am, Grolsch, Bristol & West (with Joan Collins) and Le Jardin de Max Factor (with Jane Seymour).

Since 1982 Aubrey Powell has been involved in film-making, first as a producer and writer and then as director. In 2011 he directed a documentary The Bull Runners of Pamplona which took two years to make, and was shot in HD and 3D. The film won the Best Documentary Film 2012 at the New Jersey Film Festival. In 2012 he directed Eric Idle, Russell Brand, Eddie Izzard, Billy Connolly, Tracey Ullman and Jane Leeves in a film of the Eric Idle play What About Dick?

In 1989, Powell was made creative director for The Paul McCartney World Tour, designing the stage set, video wall and filmed images. During his tenure he directed the documentary From Rio to Liverpool for Channel 4 and the feature movie Get Back, co-directed with Richard Lester. For Paul McCartney's 1993 The New World Tour he again designed the visual staging, and directed another documentary Movin' On, and for Fox Network directed McCartney's Live in the New World concert, winning the CableACE Award and a nomination for the Golden Rose of Montreux.

Since 1994, when he created Hipgnosis Ltd, Aubrey Powell has directed documentaries, live multi-camera shoots and corporate films, like No Quarter by Page & Plant.

In 2013, Powell featured on BBC Radio 2's Sounds of the Seventies with Johnny Walker. He spoke of his career designing album artwork for notable bands, and discussed the major impact on record sleeve design caused by the Sex Pistols.

He returned to album cover designing for Pink Floyd for The Division Bell's 20th Anniversary box set as well as supervising the artwork for the final Pink Floyd album The Endless River and overseeing the cover for Pink Floyd member David Gilmour's solo album Rattle That Lock. Powell also edited the 2019 reissue of Pink Floyd's 1989 concert film, Delicate Sound of Thunder.
