= Amphitheatre of Pompeii =

Ancient Roman amphitheater in Pompeii

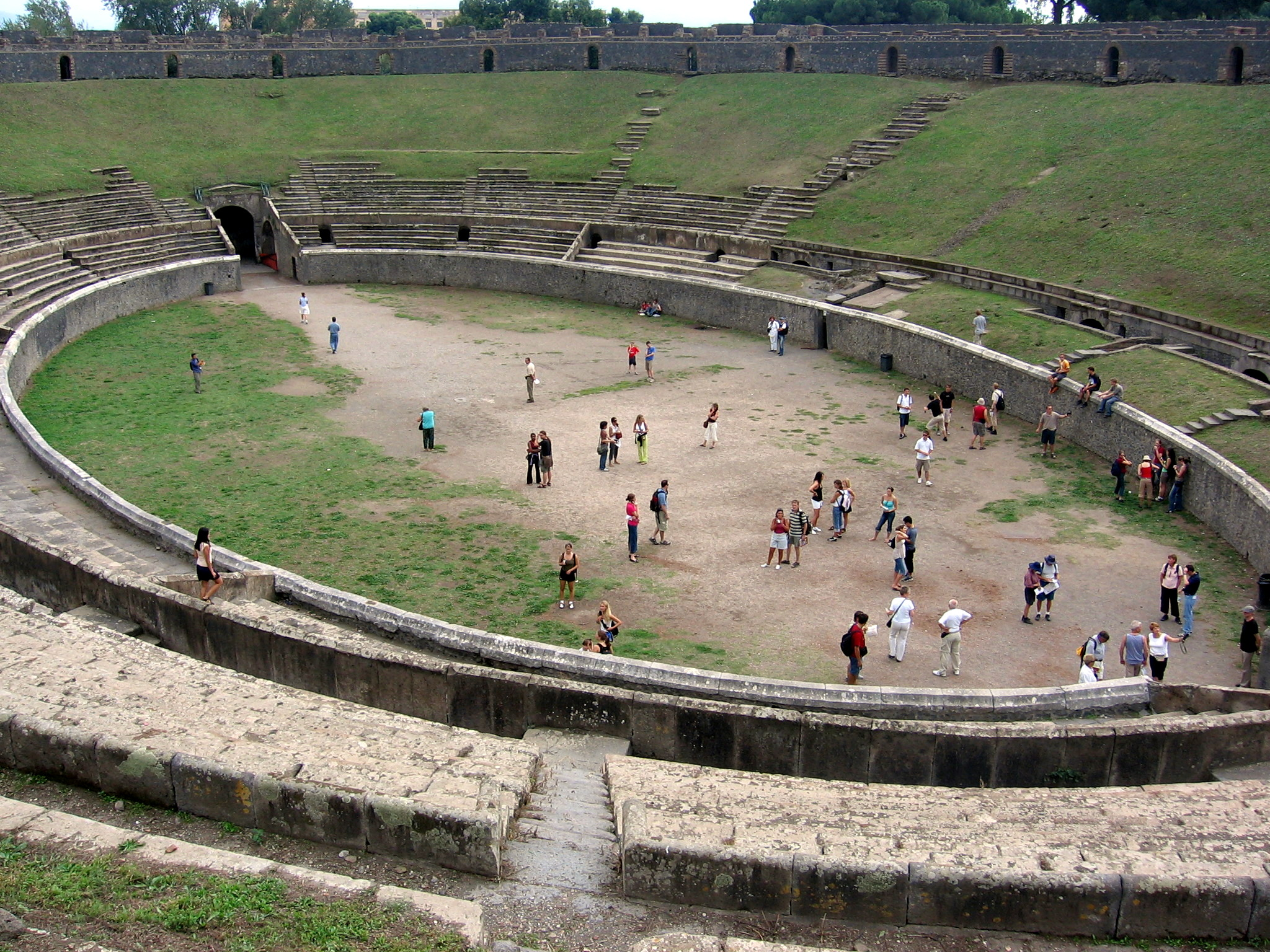
- Interactive map of Amphitheatre of Pompeii
- 40°45′05″N 14°29′42″E
- Type: Amphitheatre
- Location: Pompeii, Campania, Italy

History
- Built: c. 70 BC
- Abandoned: 79 AD, Eruption of Vesuvius

Site notes
- Length: 135 metres (443 ft)
- Width: 104 metres (341 ft)
- Excavation dates: 1748, 1813–16

The Amphitheatre of Pompeii is one of the oldest surviving Roman amphitheatres. It is located in the ancient city of Pompeii, near Naples, and was buried by the eruption of Mount Vesuvius in 79 AD, along with the city of Pompeii and the neighbouring town of Herculaneum. Six bodies were found during the excavations.

== Design and construction ==
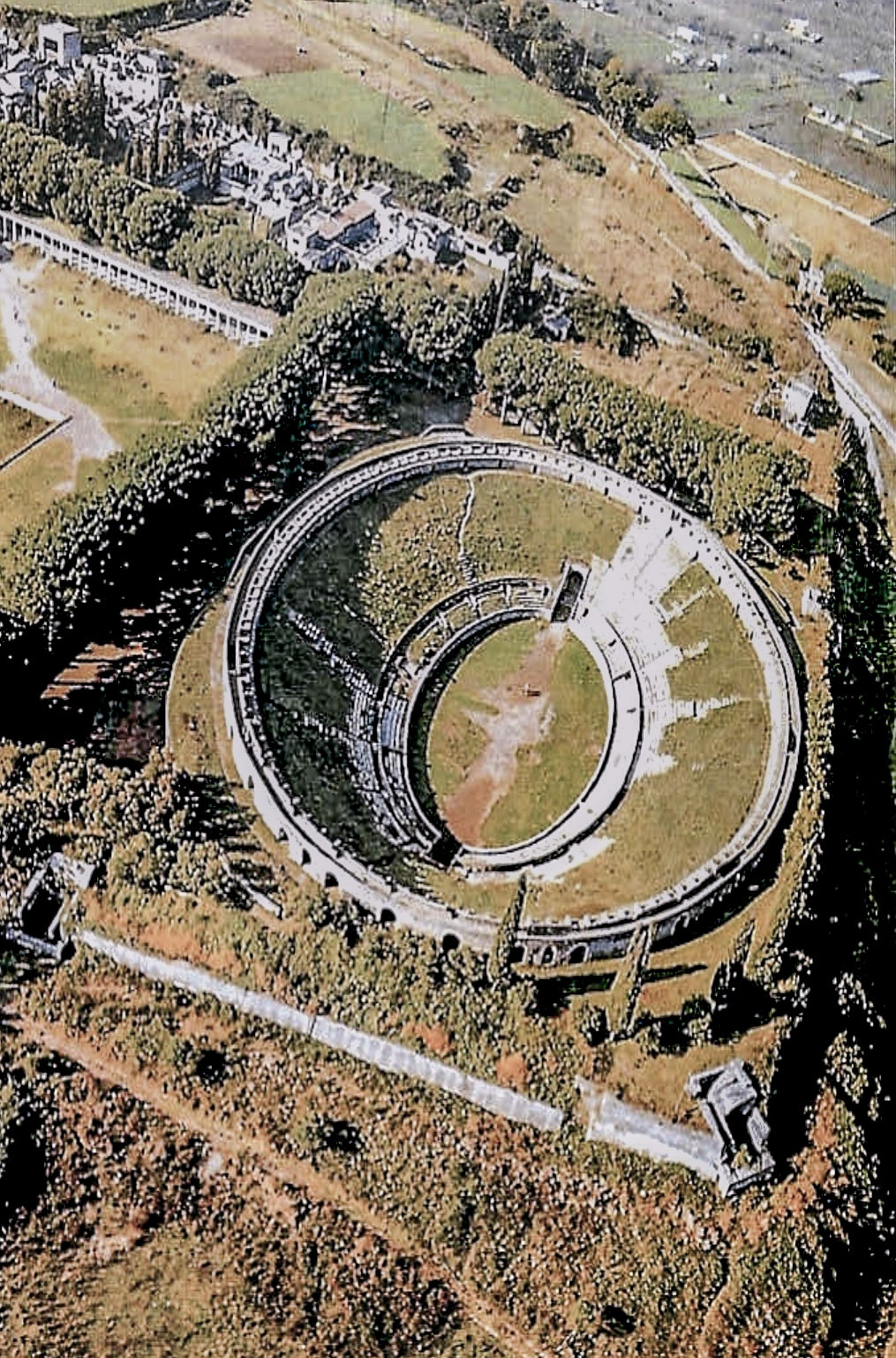
Aerial view of the amphitheatre

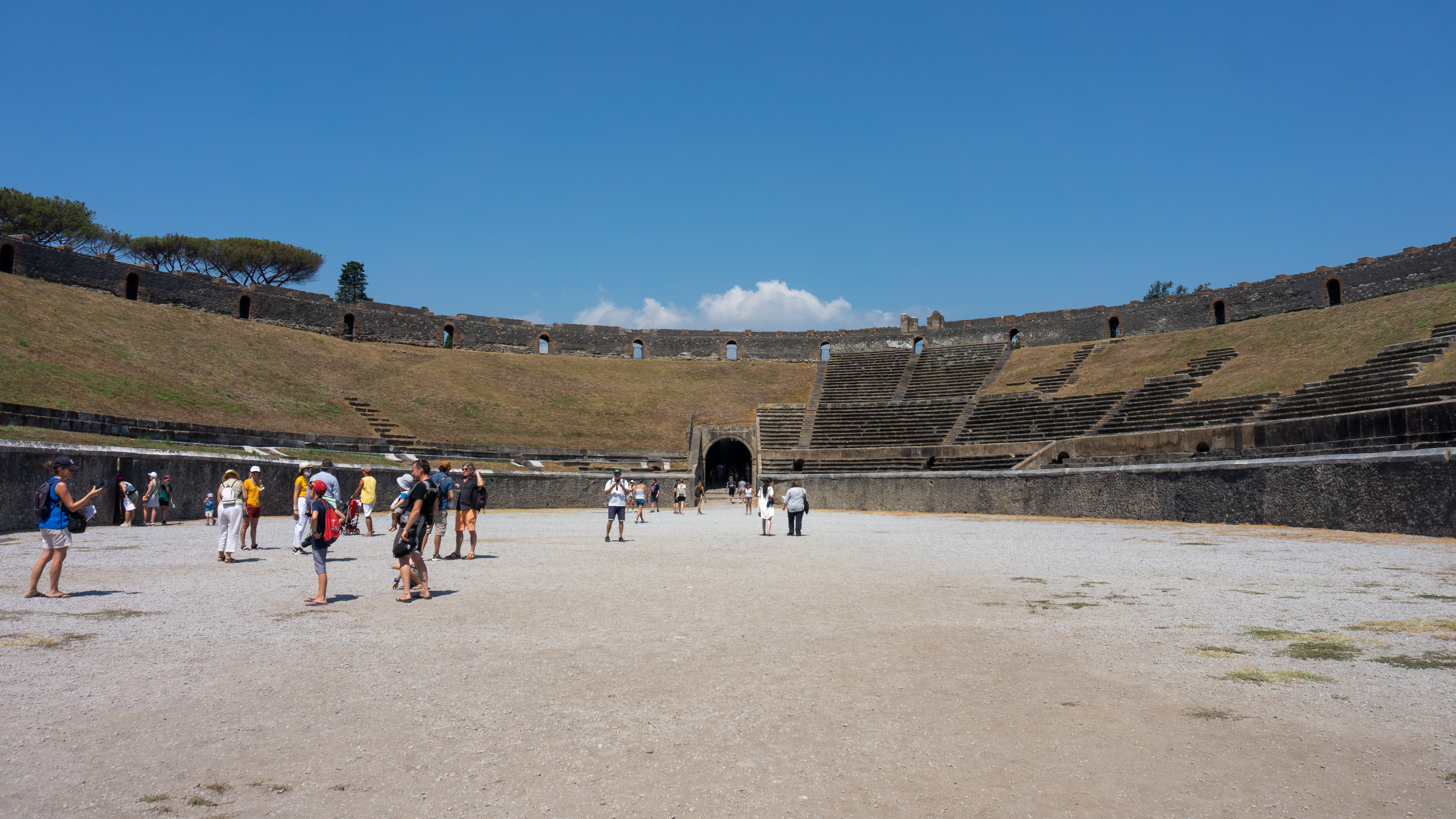
View of the cavea and arena floor

Built around 70 BC, the amphitheatre is one of the earliest Roman amphitheatres built of stone; previously, they had been built out of wood.

Contemporarily, it was known as a spectacula rather than an amphitheatrum, since the latter term was not yet in use at the time. It was built with the private funds of Gaius Quinctius Valgus and Marcus Porcius (a relative of Cato the Younger). It was constructed shortly after Pompeii's induction as a Roman colony, and an inscription on the amphitheatre honouring the donors cites one of their motives being "to demonstrate the honour of the colony" perhaps indicating the amphitheatre's role in establishing Roman influence in Pompeii.

The amphitheatre was designed to host around 20,000 people. The design of the lower entrances for higher-class citizens, who would have been seated closest to the arena, has been noted for the unique views, striking for both the light flooding the dark tunnel and the roar of the crowd as they entered the amphitheatre, creating a dramatic experience.

Being one of the earliest amphitheatres, there was no underground area for the gladiators. Instead, the quadriporticus was built above ground and close to the arena. When events were over, the dead were taken through a large door named the Porta Libitinensis to be disposed of.

The amphitheatre measures 135m long and 104m wide. The arena is 6m below ground level and measures 66.7m long and 35.1m wide. The only internal features of the amphitheatre at Pompeii were a corridor that cut into the base of cavea, the tiered semicircular seating space. This corridor ran the circumference of the amphitheatre and is used to access the arena.

== Gladiatorial contests ==
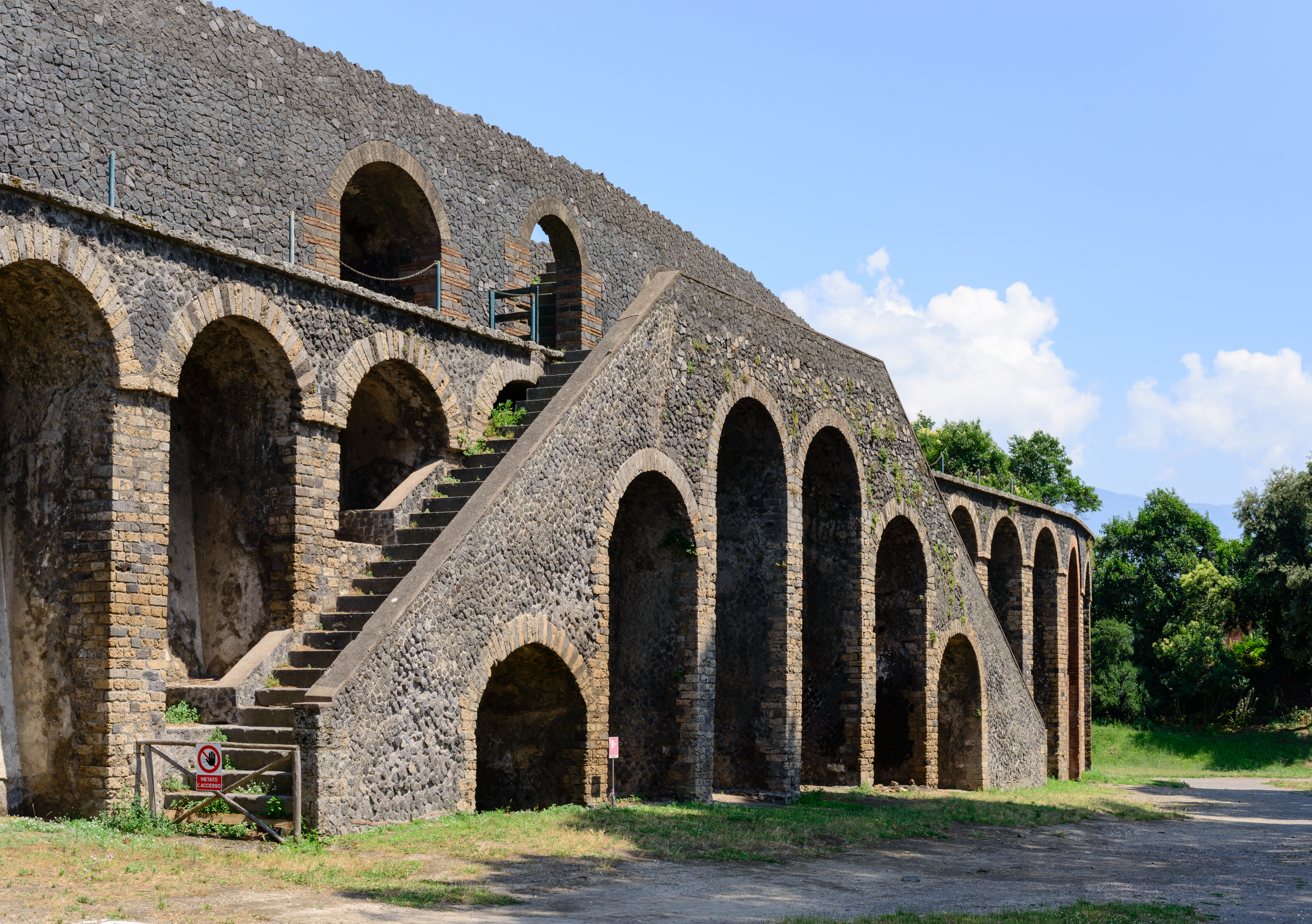
Exterior with the western stairs

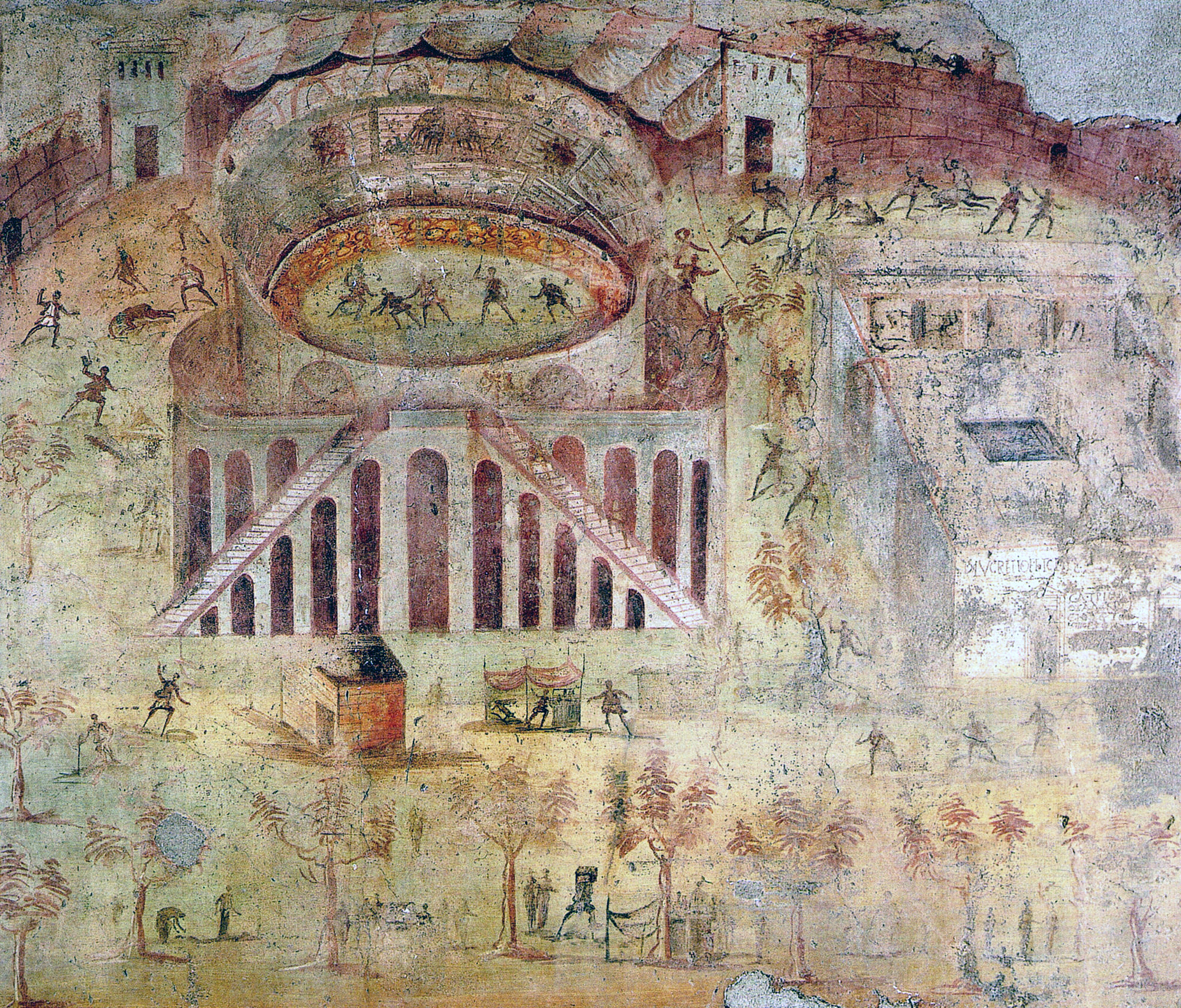
Fresco depicting the 59 AD riot between the Nucerians and the Pompeiians in the amphitheatre, found in the house of Actius Anicetus, now in National Archaeological Museum, Naples

The preservation of Pompeii and its amphitheatre has given insights into the gladiatorial culture of Rome. Painted posters on the walls of the amphitheatre have been uncovered depicting gladiators accompanied by slogans and nicknames, evoking shades of the modern posters, billboards, and banners depicting today's sports stars and celebrities. Some of the posters would be repainted over to state the outcomes of the major events. For example, one poster declares a gladiator to be the "Heart throb of the girls." A recovered fresco depicts the end of a fight, with the losing gladiator awaiting his fate.

One of the most notable events in the amphitheatre's history occurred around 59 AD, when a deadly brawl occurred between Pompeiians and residents of Nuceria during games in the amphitheatre, resulting in a 10-year ban on such events there. Some events like beast hunting and athletic competition were still allowed to take place, possibly due to the intervention of empress Poppaea Sabina and a local magistrate.

== Earthquake ==
The amphitheatre was damaged by an earthquake in 62 AD. The magistrate Cuspius Pansa and his son undertook its restoration. After its restoration, the 10-year ban on events was revoked.

== Excavations ==
The amphitheatre was first partially excavated in 1748. It was later completely excavated between 1813 and 1816.

== Modern uses ==
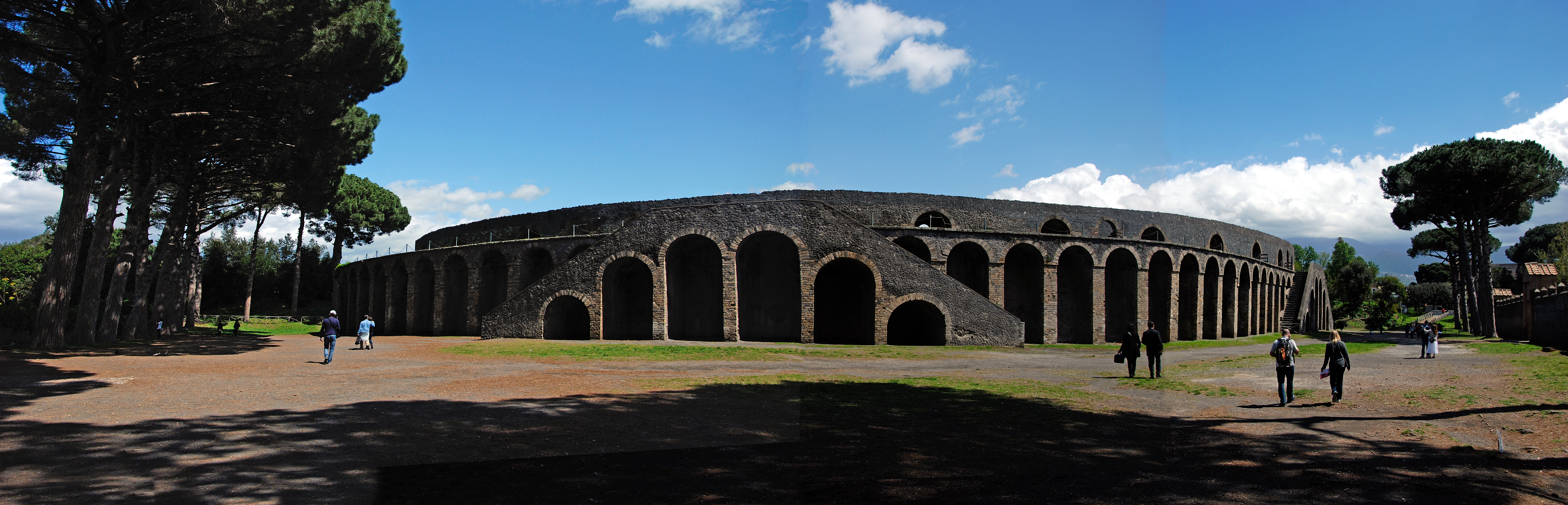
A panoramic view of the exterior façade of the Pompeii Amphitheatre, 2016

The amphitheatre and the 59 AD riot were portrayed in the Cambridge Latin Course in unit 1.

Aside from being a historical landmark and an object of archaeological study, the amphitheatre has been used for concerts and other public events in modern times. Over a 4-day period in October 1971, Pink Floyd made a concert film at the amphitheatre, titled Pink Floyd: Live at Pompeii in which the band plays a typical live set but without any audience except for the film crew. David Gilmour, the band's guitarist, returned to perform two concerts at the amphitheatre in July 2016 as part of his Rattle That Lock Tour. Gilmour's 2016 concerts saw the first public performances in the amphitheatre since 79 AD and are featured on the live album/video Live at Pompeii.

In 2015 a temporary museum was installed in the centre of the amphitheatre. The pyramidal structure was designed to resemble Mount Vesuvius, and housed the installation "Pompeii and Europe from 1748 to 1943", which displayed casts of 20 victims of the eruption and photographs of the excavations.

In 2018, the venue hosted a live performance by the English progressive rock group King Crimson.

In 2023, the venue was used as a filming location for rapper Travis Scott's visual album Circus Maximus.

In 2026 the band Marillion hosted two concerts at the venue. They were attended by fans from 50 different countries.

Performers at the amphitheatre
Date	Performer(s)	Tour/event	Attendance
4 October 1971	Pink Floyd	Pink Floyd: Live at Pompeii	film crew only
5 October 1971	Pink Floyd	Pink Floyd: Live at Pompeii	film crew only
6 October 1971	Pink Floyd	Pink Floyd: Live at Pompeii	film crew only
7 October 1971	Pink Floyd	Pink Floyd: Live at Pompeii	film crew only
7 July 2016	David Gilmour	Rattle That Lock Tour	2,600
8 July 2016	David Gilmour	Rattle That Lock Tour	2,600
12 July 2016	Elton John	Wonderful Crazy Night Tour	1,723
19 July 2018	King Crimson	Uncertain Times Tour	
20 July 2018	King Crimson	Uncertain Times Tour	
22 July 2018	Bonnie Raitt & James Taylor	Dig in Deep Tour	
21 October 2022	Max Gazzè	Pompeii Echoes, Max Gazzè – Immersive Experience	
27 June 2025	Andrea Bocelli	Andrea Bocelli 30: The Celebration	
28 June 2025	Andrea Bocelli	Andrea Bocelli 30: The Celebration	
3 July 2025	Dream Theater	Summer Tour 2025	
5 July 2025	Jean-Michel Jarre	Special Summer Live Tour 2025	
25 July 2025	Bryan Adams	The Bare Bones Tour 2025	
24 June 2026	Of Monsters and Men	The Mouse Parade Tour	
10 July 2026	Opeth/Blood Incantation	European Summer Tour	
25 July 2026	Marillion	Live 2026	
26 July 2026	Marillion	Live 2026	
27 July 2026	Savatage	Prelude to Madness Tour 2026	

== See also ==
- Theatre Area of Pompeii
- List of Roman amphitheatres

== Bibliography ==
- Mazois, François; Gau, François C. (1838). "Amphithéatre". In Mazois, François; Gau, François (eds.). Les ruines de Pompei (in French). Vol. 4. Paris. pp. 77–86. doi:10.11588/diglit.3748.
- Overbeck, Johannes (1884). "Das Amphitheater". Pompeji in seinen Gebäuden, Alterthümern und Kunstwerken (in German). Leipzig: Engelmann. pp. 176–198. doi:10.11588/diglit.22562.
- Jacobelli, Luciana (2003). "The Amphitheater". Gladiators at Pompeii. Getty Publications. pp. 53–64. ISBN 9780892367313.
