= Michaël Boumendil =

French composer and producer

- Born: Michaël Boumendil; 25 April 1971 (age 55); Sarcelles, France
- Occupation: Sound designer

Michaël Boumendil (born 25 April 1971) is a French composer and producer. In the early 1990s, he conceived the idea to create sonic identities for brands. In 1995, he founded Sixième Son, an agency dedicated to sonic branding and is responsible for the audio identities and music design for brands such as Unilever, Huggies, Lada Autos, Samsung, Cartier, Dior, Lancôme, Baccarat, Carrefour, Enel, Vueling, Michelin, Renault, AXA and others. He is one of the pioneers of sonic identity.

== Career ==
Boumendil was born in the suburbs of Paris (Sarcelles, France) and at the age of 11 began showing interest in music. He began by composing his first songs and by the time he was 13, he joined his first rock band. This early experience would motivate him throughout the rest of his music career.

After graduating high school at 17, Boumendil continued on to preparatory school in business and economics and shortly after enrolled in EDHEC. There studied marketing and communication and graduated in 1994. He then decided to build a business around his two passions, music and design, bringing music into the field of design and brand strategy. Only one year after graduating, he founded the first musical design - or more often called sonic branding - agency Sixième Son in 1995. The idea was essentially to translate the visual groundwork of a brand into a sonic complement for the brand.

In 2017, Boumendil set off to the United States to start a New York office in order to develop the agency’s presence in North America. He has now become not only an expert in sonic identity and sound design; he is also a vocal identity specialist. Today, he continues to globally expand Sixième Son most notably in Australia, Canada, Spain, and Russia.

In June 2017, Boumendil published a book devoted to sonic branding: Musical Design and Brand Strategy (published by Eyrolles). He has also contributed to Colleen Fahey’s book, Audio Branding: Using Sound to Build Your Brand (KoganPage 2017), as well as Laurence Minsky and Ilan Geva’s Global Brand Management (KoganPage 2019).

In 2023, he was knighted by the French government, as Chevalier des Arts et des Lettres.

2025, composition of the official anthem of the Bleuet de France, "Souffle du Bleuet", on the occasion of the institution’s centenary.

== David Gilmour's "Rattle That Lock" ==
Boumendil's SNCF jingle has inspired the title track of former Pink Floyd guitarist David Gilmour's 2015 album, Rattle That Lock (2015). It was co-written by Gilmour and Boumendil, with lyrics by Gilmour's wife Polly Samson. Gilmour, in many interviews, has talked about the rare quality of Boumendil's work.

In late 2016, Boumendil sued Gilmour, claiming that Gilmour had violated the terms of the agreement by using a recording of the jingle from SNCF stations and not re-recording it. In May 2019 the French Court ruled against the case, stating that the necessary permissions had been sought and ordering Boumendil to pay Gilmour's court costs. Boumendil appealed the decision but a judgement in June 2021 from the Court of Appeal of Paris and a final judgement in December 2022 from the Court of Cessation both rejected Boumendil's case, with Gilmour again awarded costs as well as the right to keep using the jingle.
