= Adrian Maben =

British film and television director, writer, and producer (1942–2025)

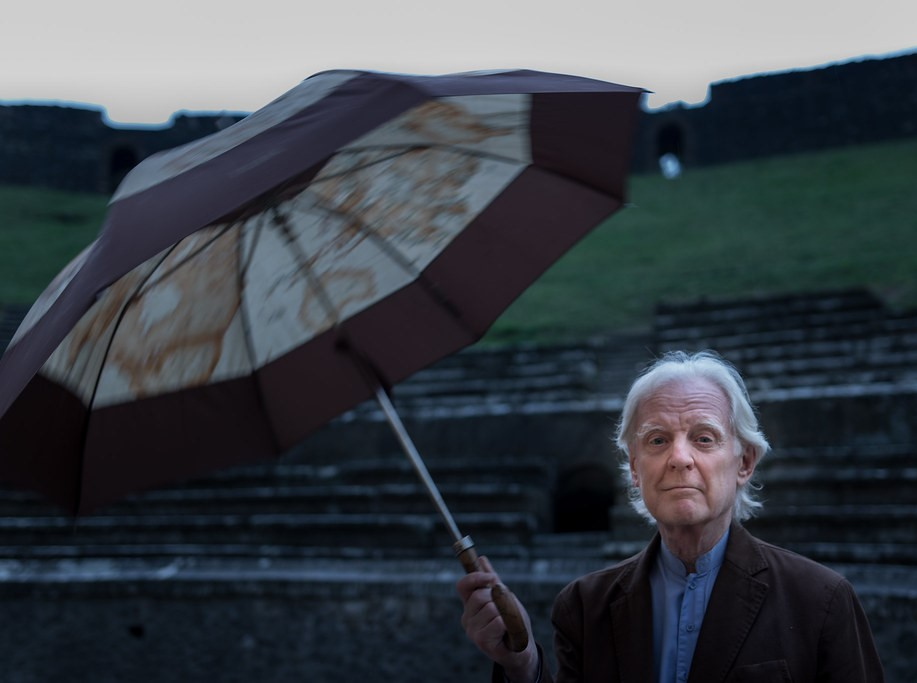
- Adrian Maben in Pompeii (2022)
- Born: Adrian Mitchell Maben; 30 June 1942; Chippenham, Wiltshire, England
- Died: 28 October 2025 (aged 83); Ivry-sur-Seine, Val-de-Marne, France
- Occupations: Film and television director, writer, and producer
- Employer: ORTF
- Known for: Film documentaries on music and art
- Notable work: Pink Floyd: Live at Pompeii (1972)

Adrian Maben (1942–2025) was a British film and television director, writer, and producer.

Maben directed a number of films and documentaries on music and art, in particular Pink Floyd: Live at Pompeii in 1972, featuring the rock band Pink Floyd playing in the Roman amphitheatre at Pompeii. He worked for the Office de Radiodiffusion Télévision Française (ORTF) between 1970 and 1973. Maben directed the news programme Soir 3 on France 3. He was born British but obtained French nationality.

In 1991, he was a conference speaker along with the director Robert Altman and the composer Carl Stone, chaired by the film historian Michael Renov. A director's cut of Pink Floyd: Live at Pompeii was re-edited by Maben in 2003, with additional images of the Solar System.

Maben made several documentary films on artists such as René Magritte (1978), Paul Delvaux (1987), and Hieronymus Bosch (2003), and the photographer Helmut Newton (1989). In 2016, he held an exhibition at Pompeii in Italy.

== Filmography and television ==
Maben directed the following:

- Opération Apollo (1969)
- Pink Floyd: Live at Pompeii (1972)
- Phonzeit (1975)
- Monsieur René Magritte (1978)
- James Brown Soul Brother No. 1: The James Brown Story (1978)
- Raoul Coutard in Étoiles et toiles (1982)
- Le petit théâtre de Bouvard (1982)
- Paul Delvaux: The Sleepwalker of Saint Idesbald (1987)
- Le grand escalator (1987)
- Helmut Newton: Frames from the Edge (1989)
- A Window to Heaven (1990)
- Riviera (1991)
- La case de l'oncle Doc (1997)
- The Khmer Rouge: Power and Terror (2001)
- Ourasi, le roi fainéant (2003)
- All Hell Let Loose: The Demonic World of Hieronymus Bosch (2003)
- Pink Floyd: Live at Pompeii (Director's Cut) (2003)
- The Making of Ça Ira (2005)
- Comrade Duch: The Bookkeeper of Death (2011)
- Pink Floyd: Chit Chat with Oysters (2013)
